= List of radio stations in Belgium =

The following is a list of radio stations in Belgium.

== Public broadcasters ==
Belgium has three public broadcasters, one for each national language.

- The Vlaamse Radio- en Televisieomroeporganisatie (VRT) for the Dutch-speaking Flemish Community (Flanders)
- The Radio Télévision Belge Francophone (RTBF) for the French Community of Belgium (Wallonia and Brussels)
- The Belgischer Rundfunk (BRF) for the German-speaking Community of Belgium (East Cantons)

== List of FM radio services by community ==
The following is a list of FM radio stations broadcasting in Belgium. There is also DAB+ coverage in many parts of Belgium, with most of the DAB+ stations being available on FM as well.

=== The French Community ===
==== Public (RTBF) ====
- La Première
- VivaCité
  - VivaCité Bruxelles (local programs in Brussels)
  - VivaCité (local programs in Liège, Wavre, Namur, Mons, Luxembourg and Charleroi)
- Classic 21
- Tipik (formerly Pure FM)
- Musiq'3

===== DAB+ =====
- Jam.
- Viva+
- VivaSport
- RTBF Mix (mix of La Première, Classic 21 and VivaCité in Flanders)

===== Internet radio =====
- TARMAC

==== Nationwide ====
- Bel RTL
- Radio Contact
- Fun Radio
- Nostalgie Wallonie
- NRJ
- LN Radio

===== DAB+ =====
- Contact Max
- Nostalgie +

===== Internet radio =====
- Mint
- Chérie Belgique
- NRJ+
- Nostalgie Live

==== Regional stations ====
- Antipode (Walloon Brabant)
- Maximum FM (Liège)
- Inside Radio (since 01.01.2024, before Must FM (Luxembourg, Namur)
- Radio KIF (Brussels)
- Sud Radio (Hainaut)
- Vibration FM (Brussels)

==== Local stations ====
- Fréquence Eghezée (Eghezée, Province de Namur)
- Radio Quartz (Sombreffe, Province de Namur)
- 48FM (Liège)
- Ultrason (Nivelles)
- YouFM (Mons)
- Hit Radio (Namur)
- Warm (Liège)

=== The German Community ===
==== Public (BRF) ====
- BRF 1
- BRF 2
- BRF-DLF (Brussels)

==== Regional stations ====
- 100.5 Das Hitradio (East Cantons)
- Radio Contact (East Cantons)
- Fantasy Dance FM (East Cantons)
- Radio 700 (East Cantons)
- Radio Sunshine (East Cantons)

== Other languages ==
=== English language ===
- AFN Benelux () – (Everberg) and nearby: 101.7 MHz FM and online – (Mons) : 104.2 MHz FM
- BBC World Service () – (Brussels) region and Flanders : DAB+ Block 11A – 216.928 MHz and online

=== Turkish language ===
- Gold FM () – Brussels region : 106.1 FM and online

=== Arabic language ===
- AraBel FM () – Brussels and surroundings : 106.8 MHz FM and online (70% French and 30% Arabic)

=== Armenian language ===
Belgahay Radio () – Brussels and surroundings: DAB+ digital radio and online (70% Armenian and 30% French). Also available via mobile application (iOS & Android), live stream on website, and full video episodes on YouTube.

=== Spanish language ===
- Radio Alma () – Brussels and surroundings : 101.9 MHz FM and online (mixture of French and Mediterranean languages : Spanish, Italian, Greek, Portuguese)

=== Italian language ===
- Radio Italia () – Charleroi : 105.2 MHz FM and online
