= List of television stations in Belgium =

This list contains the Belgian television channels that are broadcast either terrestrially (DVB-T), via cable (Telenet, VOO and Numericable) or phone lines (Proximus), or via satellite (TV Vlaanderen and Télésat).

Name	Owner	Description	Language	Availability
AB3	Mediawan Thematics	commercial station	French	Cable networks in Wallonia, Brussels and Flanders - Satellite
ABX	Mediawan Thematics	commercial station	French	Cable networks in Wallonia and Brussels - Satellite
Antenne Centre		Regional television of the La Louvière area	French	Cable networks in Province of Hainaut, city of La Louvière and surroundings)
Arte Belgique	Cooperation between RTBF and ARTE	Cultural network	French	Cable networks in Wallonia, Brussels and Flanders - Satellite
ATV		Regional television of the Antwerp area	Dutch	Cable networks in Province of Antwerp, Arrondissement of Antwerp
AVS		Regional television of the Ghent area	Dutch	Cable networks in Province of East Flanders, Arrondissements of Ghent, Eeklo and Oudenaarde
BBC Belgium	BBC Studios	commercial station, series channel	Dutch	Cable networks in Flanders and Brussels - Satellite
Be 1	VOO	Pay TV, formerly Canal + Belgique, with the channels Be 1, Be 1 +1, Be Ciné, Be Be Séries, VOOsport World (1-4)	French	Cable networks in Wallonia, Brussels and Flanders - (HD version of Be 1 and VOOsport World 1)
Be Ciné	VOO	Pay TV, movies channel	French	Cable networks in Wallonia, Brussels and Flanders - (HD version of Be Ciné)
Be Séries	VOO	Pay TV, series channel	French	Cable networks in Wallonia, Brussels and Flanders - (HD version of Be Séries)
BRF TV	Belgischer Rundfunk	Regional public broadcaster for the German-speaking community of Belgium	German	Cable networks in the German-speaking community and surrounding Walloon municipalities
BRUZZ	Vlaams-Brusselse Media vzw	Regional television of Brussels	Dutch	Cable networks in the Brussels Capital Region
BX1	BX1	Regional broadcaster for the Brussels-Capital Region	French	Cable networks in Brussels Capital Region, DVB-T in Brussels
Canal C		Regional television of the Namur area	French	Cable networks in Province of Namur, city of Namur and surroundings
Canal Zoom		Regional television of the Gembloux area	French	Cable networks in Province of Namur, city of Gembloux and surroundings
Comedy Central	Skydance Europe & Africa	commercial station	Dutch	Cable networks in Flanders and Brussels
DAZN	DAZN Group	pay-TV with the channels DAZN 1-3 and DAZN Pro League 1-3	French, Dutch	Cable networks in Flanders, Brussels and Wallonia. DAZN with extended exclusive football content from Pro League.
Discovery Channel	Skydance Europe & Africa	Documentary	Dutch	Cable networks in Flanders and Brussels.
Disney Channel	The Walt Disney Company	children's channel	Dutch and French	Cable networks in Flanders, Brussels and Wallonia - Satellite.
Disney Jr.	The Walt Disney Company	children's channel	Dutch	Cable networks in Flanders and Brussels - Satellite.
Euronews	Euronews SA	news station	French, English, German, Italian, Spanish	Cable and DVB-T in Wallonia and Brussels (Only French audio on DVB-T)
Eurosport	Skydance Europe & Africa	pay-TV with the channels Eurosport 1-2	French, Dutch	Cable networks in Flanders, Brussels and Wallonia.
Focus TV	Roularta Media Group	Regional television of the Bruges area and the Belgian coast	Dutch	Cable networks in Province of West Flanders, Arrondissements of Bruges, Ostend, Diksmuide and Veurne
Ketnet	VRT	children's network of the VRT	Dutch	Cable networks in Flanders, Brussels and Wallonia - Satellite
La Une	RTBF	public broadcaster	French	Cable networks in Wallonia, Brussels and Flanders - Satellite - DVB-T in Wallonia and Brussels - (HD version on cable)
La Trois/RTBF Auvio Kids TV	RTBF	kid's timeshared and cultural	French	Cable networks and DVB-T in Wallonia and Brussels - (HD version on cable)
LN24	IPM Group	commercial station, generalist channel	French	Cable networks in Flanders, Brussels and Wallonia - Satellite.
MaTélé		Regional television of the Jemelles area	French	Cable networks in Province of Namur, Arrondissement of Dinant
National Geographic	National Geographic Society & The Walt Disney Company	Documentary	Dutch and French	Cable networks in Flanders, Brussels and Wallonia - Satellite.
Nickelodeon/MTV	Skydance Europe & Africa	children's channel / music station	Dutch and French	Cable networks in Flanders and Brussels - Satellite
Nick Jr.	Skydance Europe & Africa	children's channel	Dutch	Cable networks in Flanders and Brussels - Satellite
NoTélé		Regional television of the Tournai area	French	Cable networks in Province of Hainaut, city of Tournai and surroundings
Pickx+	Proximus	pay-TV, movie and series channel	Dutch / French	Proximus VDSL network in Flanders, Brussels and Wallonia.
Pickx+ Sports	Proximus	pay-TV with the channels Pickx+ Sports 1-10 and Pickx+ Sports Pop-up	Dutch / French	Proximus VDSL network in Flanders, Brussels and Wallonia. Via Calcio Closed down after two seasons broadcasting Italian football competition. Proximus 11+ launched in July 2012 with extended exclusive football content from UEFA Champions League, Spanish and Portuguese competitions, whilst Proximus 11 offers free Belgian football competition. Proximus 5 started January 2012 with exclusive Belgian basketball competition.
Play	Play Media	mainstream and young channel	Dutch	Cable networks in Flanders and Brussels - Satellite - (HD version on cable)
Play Actie	Play Media	channel aimed at men	Dutch	Cable networks in Flanders and Brussels - Satellite - (HD version on cable)
Play Crime	Play Media	Crime channel in movie and series	Dutch	Cable networks in Flanders and Brussels - Satellite - (HD version on cable)
Play Fictie	Play Media	entertainment channel	Dutch	Cable networks in Flanders and Brussels - Satellite - (HD version on cable)
Play Reality	Play Media	channel aimed at women	Dutch	Cable networks in Flanders and Brussels - Satellite - (HD version on cable)
Play More	Play Media & Telenet	pay-TV with the channels Play More Black, Play More Cinema, Play More Kicks	Dutch	Telenet cable network in Flanders and Brussels (Play More Black, Play More Cinema & Play More Kicks in HD)
Play Sports	Play Media & Telenet	pay-TV with the channels Play Sports 1-8, Play Sports Golf	Dutch	Telenet cable network in Flanders and Brussels (Play Sports 1-4 & 7, Play Sports Golf & Play Sports Premier League in HD)
Qmusic TV	DPG Media	music station	Dutch	Cable networks in Flanders and Brussels - Satellite.
Qu4tre Liège Média		Regional television of the Liège area	French	Cable networks in Liège Province, city of Liège and surroundings - (HD version on cable)
Radio Contact Vision	DPG Media & Groupe Rossel	visual radio	French	Cable networks in Wallonia and Brussels - Satellite.
Ring TV		Regional television of the western part of Flemish Brabant	Dutch	Cable networks in Province of Flemish Brabant, Arrondissement of Halle-Vilvoorde
ROB TV	Corelio	Regional television of the Leuven area	Dutch	Cable networks in Flemish Brabant, Arrondissement of Leuven
RTL Club	DPG Media & Groupe Rossel	commercial station	French	Cable networks in Wallonia, Brussels and Flanders - Satellite - (HD version on cable)
RTL District	DPG Media & Groupe Rossel	Crime channel in movie and series	French	Cable networks in Wallonia, Brussels and Flanders - Satellite - (HD version on cable)
RTL Plug	DPG Media & Groupe Rossel	commercial station	French	Cable networks in Wallonia, Brussels and Flanders - Satellite - (HD version on cable)
RTL TVI	DPG Media & Groupe Rossel	main channel of commercial TV in Wallonia and Brussels	French	Cable networks in Wallonia, Brussels and Flanders - Satellite - DVB-T in parts of Wallonia - (HD version on cable)
RTV		Regional television of the Mechelen area and the Campine	Dutch	Cable networks in Province of Antwerp, Arrondissements of Mechelen and Turnhout
Sport10	Lint Media	Sport channel	Dutch	Cable networks in Flanders, Brussels and Wallonia - (HD version on cable)
Stories	Vlamex BVBA	Showbizz channel	Dutch	Cable networks in Flanders and Brussels - Satellite
Studio 100 TV	Studio 100 & Proximus	music station for children	Dutch	Cable networks in Flanders and Brussels
Star Channel	The Walt Disney Company	TV series channel	Dutch	Cable networks in Flanders and Brussels - Satellite.
Télé MB		Regional television of the Mons area	French	Cable networks in Province of Hainaut, city of Mons and surroundings
Télé Sambre		Regional television of the Charleroi area	French	Cable networks in Province of Hainaut, city of Charleroi and surroundings
Télé Vesdre		Regional television of the Verviers area	French	Cable networks in Province of Liège, city of Verviers and surroundings
Tipik	RTBF	public broadcaster	French	Cable networks in Wallonia, Brussels and Flanders - Satellite - DVB-T in Wallonia and Brussels - (HD version on cable)
TipikVision	RTBF	visual radio	French	Cable networks in Wallonia and Brussels - Satellite.
TLC	Skydance Europe & Africa	channel aimed at women	Dutch	Cable networks in Flanders and Brussels - Satellite
Trends Z	Roularta Media Group	finance channel	Dutch and French	Cable networks in Wallonia and Brussels
TV5Monde	see main page	International broadcaster	French	Satellite
TV Limburg	Concentra	Regional television of the province of Limburg	Dutch	Cable networks in Province of Limburg
TV-Oost	Concentra	Regional television of East-Flanders	Dutch	Cable networks in Province of East-Flanders, Arrondissement of Aalst, Dendermonde and Sint-Niklaas
TVCom		Regional television of Walloon Brabant	French	Cable networks in Province of Walloon Brabant
TV Lux	TV Lux ASBL	Regional television of Belgian Luxembourg	French	Cable networks in Province of Luxembourg
VOOSport World	VOO	pay-TV with the channels VOOSport World (1-4)	French	Cable networks in Wallonia and Brussels
VRT 1	VRT	Main channel of the Flemish public broadcaster	Dutch	Cable networks in Flanders, Brussels and Wallonia - Satellite
VRT Canvas/Ketnet Junior	VRT	kid's timeshared, cultural and sports channel	Dutch	Cable networks in Flanders, Brussels and Wallonia - Satellite
VTM/VTM Kids	DPG Media	main channel and kid's channel timeshared of commercial TV in Flanders and Brussels	Dutch	Cable networks in Flanders and Brussels - Satellite - (HD version)
VTM2	DPG Media	Lifestyle channel	Dutch	Cable networks in Flanders and Brussels - Satellite
VTM3	DPG Media	general entertainment	Dutch	Cable networks in Flanders and Brussels
VTM4	DPG Media	young and alternative channel	Dutch	Cable networks in Flanders and Brussels - Satellite
VTM Gold	DPG Media	Classic series & show	Dutch	Cable networks in Flanders and Brussels - Satellite
VTM Series	DPG Media	TV series Program	Dutch	Cable networks in Flanders and Brussels - Satellite - (HD version)
WTV	Roularta Media Group	Regional television of the southern part of West-Flanders	Dutch	Cable networks in Province of West-Flanders, Arrondissements of Kortrijk, Roeselare, Tielt and Ypres

== See also ==
- Television in Belgium
