= Laurent Rieppi =

Belgian radio journalist

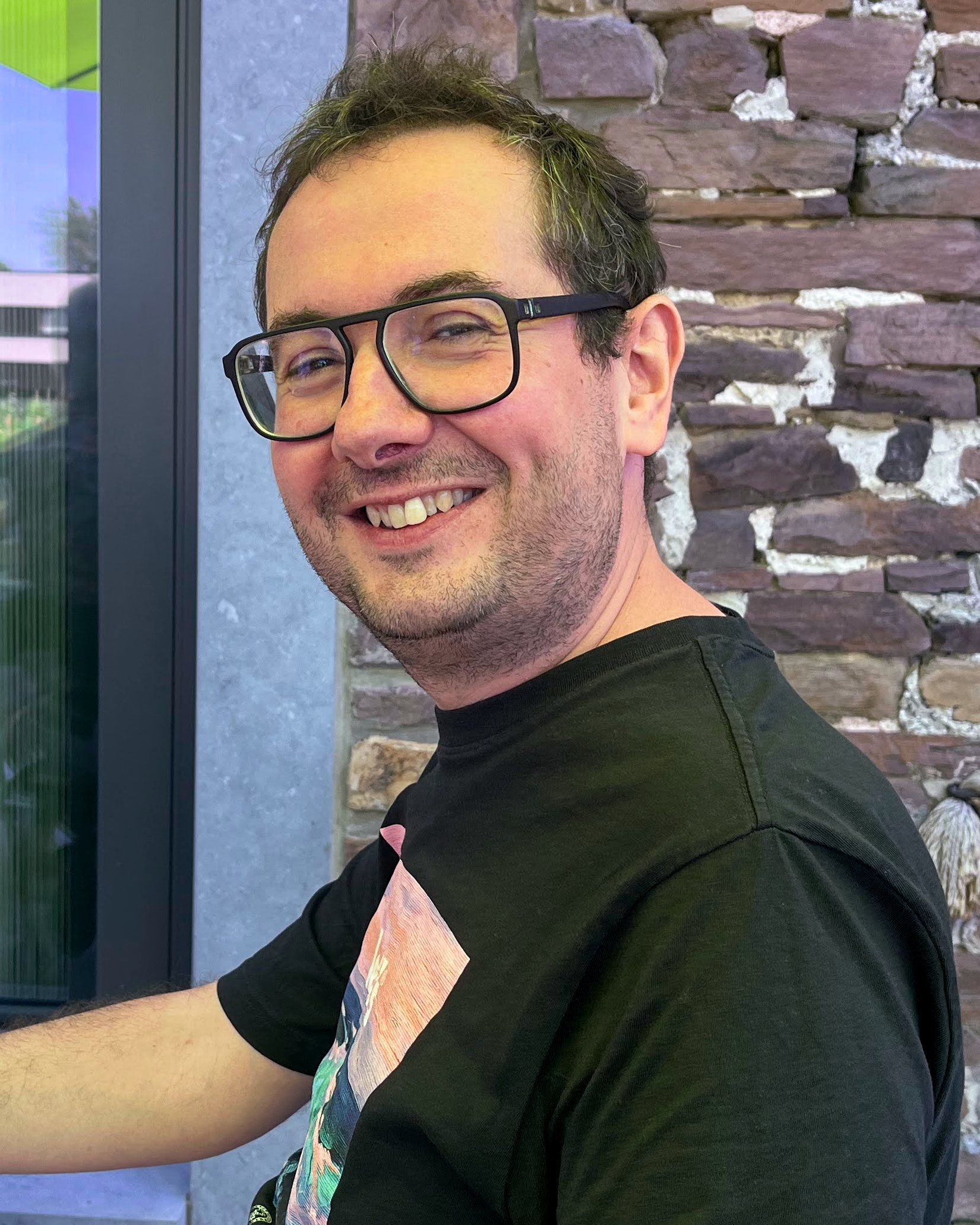
- Laurent Rieppi in July 2022
- Born: 14 October 1980 (age 45); Seraing, Belgium
- Occupations: radio journalist, music columnist, rock historian, author, professor and speaker
- Years active: 2001–present
- Known for: Audiovisual press, rock history
- Awards: Prix des Radios francophones publiques 2010 for "Best Editorialised Music Programme" in the "Short Format" category
- Website: laurentrieppi.com

Laurent Rieppi (born 14 October 1980) is a Belgian radio journalist, music columnist, rock historian, author, professor, and speaker specialising in rock music.

He is currently a journalist and music columnist at Classic 21.

== Early life ==
At a young age Rieppi and his brother Stéphane were a fan of rock bands Queen and Led Zeppelin. Around the age of fifteen, he and a friend launched Les Dinosaures, a show highlighting bands such as Deep Purple, Black Sabbath, Led Zeppelin, and The Who. He learned radio production and presentation through this show.

During this time he discovered the Internet. In early 2002 he launched the website classic-rock.be, focused on music history and documentary research.

In 2003 Rieppi obtained a bachelor's degree in communication from the Haute École de la Province de Liège. During this period, he gained experience as an intern at RTBF, working on the programme Les Classiques de Marc Ysaye on Radio 21.

== Career ==
=== Radio and media ===
Since the launch of the station on 1 April 2004, Rieppi has worked for the French-speaking Belgian radio station Classic 21, where he writes, produces, and occasionally presents programmes and segments, focusing on the history of rock music.

Although he initially focused on classic rock from the 1970s, he later expanded his coverage to encompass rock and pop genres from the 1950s to the present day, broadcasting to Belgium and non-Belgian French-speaking audiences.

In 2006 he developed the radio programme Making-of, presented by Marc Ysaye. This series explores the origins of classic rock albums. In 2010, he and Marc Ysaye received the "Prix des Radios francophones publiques" for "Best Editorialised Music Programme" in the "Short Format" category for an episode of Making-of devoted to "Blackbird" by The Beatles.

After presenting or co-presenting numerous programmes, segments, and features across multiple radio seasons, Rieppi is currently a co-presenter on Classic 21 for the following:

- Soundtrack: A programme broadcast on Sunday mornings, co-hosted with Laurent Debeuf, Dominique Ragheb, and Walter de Paduwa. This show is part of the station's programming, offering an overview of rock music news accompanied by the station's soundtrack.
- Rock & Roll Attitude: A daily morning segment co-hosted with Fanny Gillard, featuring a new anecdote from the world of rock each day, presented within a broader social context.
- Nobody Knows: A Monday evening segment produced in collaboration with Pierre Lorand, exploring little-known facts about rock figures.

Although he does not have a regular television programme, he occasionally appears on television to discuss music news on the news bulletin of La Une, RTBF's main television channel.

=== Interviews ===
In 2005 Rieppi spoke with Marianne Faithfull. He has also held discussions with more recent and contemporary artists, such as Therapy?., and also with session musicians, sound engineers, and other individuals present at recordings or events.

According to him, their testimonies provide a different perspective on rock history, as they sometimes recall events differently from the main artists themselves – if they are still alive. For example, in 2011, he interviewed Patrick Chauvel, a photographer and war correspondent. During this conversation, Chauvel shared his memories of Jim Morrison, whom he met in 1971 at the Rock'n'Roll Circus nightclub in Paris, shortly before the singer of The Doors died.

His interviewees have included Joe Cocker (2010), Brian May and Roger Taylor of Queen (2018), Iggy Pop (2019), Nile Rodgers (2021), Tom Barman (2023), and Carlos Santana (2025). In 2023, Rieppi interviewed Mick Jagger, singer and co-founder of The Rolling Stones, on the occasion of the release of the album Hackney Diamonds.

=== Author ===
Rieppi is also an author who has written and co-written several books on artists such as David Bowie, Lou Reed, Queen, and Nick Cave. His work as an author includes biographies and explores themes within rock music.

=== Professor ===
Since 2021 Rieppi has been a professor of music culture at the Haute École Albert Jacquard, where he teaches the course History of Modern Music. His lectures cover the origins and evolution of musical movements, with a focus on the cultural impact of rock music.

=== Speaker ===
In addition to his media work, Rieppi gives lectures on the history of rock music and its cultural impact. He also organises, either independently or in collaboration, listening sessions providing commentary on classic rock albums. Occasionally, he introduces tribute band concerts, placing them within their historical context. He also hosts interactive events such as blind tests and music quizzes.

== Works ==
- Rieppi, Laurent (2013). Allo Bowie ? C'est David ! (in French). Brussels: Lamiroy. ISBN 978-2-875-95003-1. OCLC 742857231.
- Rieppi, Laurent (2014). Lou Reed – On the Wild Side (in French). Waterloo: Renaissance du livre. ISBN 978-2-507-05241-6. OCLC 902662757.
- Rieppi, Laurent (2017). David Bowie de A à Z (in French). Le livre en papier. ISBN 978-2-390-17281-9. OCLC 1400568146.
- Binamé, Antoine; Rieppi, Laurent (2017). We will rock you – Queen de A à Z (in French). Zaventem: Universal Music Books. ISBN 978-2-930-91411-4. OCLC 1041746522.
- Binamé, Antoine; Rieppi, Laurent (19 August 2022). Nick Cave - Mauvaise graine (in French). Rock & Folk. ISBN 978-2-380-58260-4.
- Gillard, Fanny; Rieppi, Laurent (2022). Rock'n'roll attitude (in French). Rock & Folk. ISBN 978-2-380-58251-2. OCLC 1368282768.
