= Walter de Paduwa =

Belgian DJ

Walter de Paduwa (aka Dr Boogie, born 1 February 1953) is a Belgian radio DJ, musician and rock'n'roll historian best known for his association with Canned Heat.

== Rock career ==
Walter de Paduwa was active in the Belgian rock scene of the early 1970s, forming the band T.U.S.H. in 1976 with Dany Lademacher and Charles Deraedemaecker (Charlie Maker) of the classic Brussels group Klepto. The band was originally named Toxic Cow-Dung, then Squeeze, and was to be renamed Tush after the ZZ Top song of that name, but on their album We're Just Boys (September 1977) the recording company (EMI) put full-stops between each letter creating the name that stuck as T.U.S.H. The album had limited success though the December 1977 single "No No No" was belatedly rediscovered as an example of classic glam-punk.

== Radio career ==
=== Dr Boogie ===
Walter de Paduwa's show Doctor Boogie features up-beat blues, boogie, groove and zydeco music. It has aired weekly since 30 October 1994 on Belgium's RTBF Radio 21 and its successor station Classic 21 and was cited in Mark Elliott's book Culture Shock! Belgium as demonstrating the unusual creativity and openmindedness of Belgium's radio scene. During the 20th anniversary show of 31 October 2014, De Paduwa revealed that the name Dr Boogie, while partially inspired by the Flamin Groovies' song, was in fact a nickname given to him by B J Scott. The show was initially intended to run for three months but never looked back. After 15 years airing on Sunday early-evenings, the show was shifted four times, via a Friday late-night slot to the current Monday evening billing, but de Paduwa claims he'd keep making the show with the same passion 'even if it were at 4am on a Tuesday'. 26 June 2015 marked the 1000th edition of the Dr Boogie radio show, and was celebrated with a three-hour Canned Heat special. In 2018, when the show moved to its Monday night slot, it was also extended to three hours, incorporating a final Blues hour nicknamed the "Black Betty". In February 2024, the show was affected by real life events, starting 40 minutes late when de Paduwa was delayed by agricultural protestors blocking his route to the studio.

De Paduwa has a penchant for playing rare vinyl recordings from his extensive personal collection. In conjunction with his shows, several Dr Boogie compilation albums have been released celebrating these genres of music.

=== Other Shows ===
De Paduwa has also presented Cool Cats, a late night show featuring mainly rockabilly music, and from 2016 to 2019 he ran what he called a three-hour 'Blues Train' in the relaunched Classic 21 Blues show. This was later reduced to a one-hour addendum to the Dr Boogie show.

== Canned Heat historian ==
For decades, De Paduwa has been a supporter of the American Woodstock-renowned boogie band Canned Heat and to this day he starts almost every regular edition of his Doctor Boogie radio show with a Canned Heat song. Long-standing Canned Heat drummer Fito de la Parra described de Paduwa as "a total blues and boogie freak" and noted that de Paduwa had "turned his home in Belgium into a museum for Canned Heat. I never knew a guy like that would exist. I've met fans who collect passes or records or pictures – maybe they covered one wall in their house with Canned Heat material. With this guy, it's been a complete obsession." The band thereupon appointed him as their unofficial historian, de la Parra giving de Paduwa many of the old tapes that he had lying around his Los Angeles garage that had been destined to be thrown away. De Paduwa and de la Parra have since issued CD archives known as Canned Heat The Boogie House Tapes in three volumes (named after de Paduwa's house museum) and Rarities from the Bob Hite Vaults, in honour of the band's original singer Bob 'The Bear' Hite.

On the Dr Boogie radio show of 29 November 2013, De Paduwa revealed that his all-time favourite Canned Heat track was the song "Canned Heat Mamma" from the band's 1969 fourth album, Hallelujah. He repeated the claim on the Dr Boogie show of 18 November 2024.

De Paduwa is the owner of the 1954 Les Paul gold top guitar originally played by 'Blind Owl' Alan Wilson on Canned Heat's classic 1960s albums. The opportunity to play this classic 'Boogie Machine' is an added incentive for certain guests to appear on the Dr Boogie show.

== Personal life ==
De Paduwa's daughter, Sara De Paduwa is herself a journalist within RTBF, Belgium's French-speaking state radio and TV. She presented the early morning slot on Vivacité and since 2015 became the main anchor on 6-8, the morning programme of La Une. In 2015, 2016 and 2017 she was voted the most popular presenter amongst Francophone-Belgians.

== Tastes and influences ==
According to his RTBF bio, de Paduwa cites as his three most formative influences, Canned Heat's Henry Vestine, the Rolling Stones star Keith Richards and Belgian cycling legend Eddy Merckx. He lists his favourite albums as Boogie With Canned Heat, Electric Ladyland by Jimi Hendrix, Elmore James' Fire Fury Recordings, At Your Birthday Party by Steppenwolf and the live Rolling Stones' recording, Get Your Ya-Ya's Out.

== Related ==
- (in Dutch) Dany Lademacher
- (in French) Sara De Paduwa

== Literature ==
- Fito de la Parra, Living The Blues. Little Big Beat, Lindewerra 2001, ISBN 3-00-007020-6.
