= Musiq'3 =

Belgium
- Broadcast area: Brussels and Wallonia
- Frequency: See list

Programming
- Language: French
- Format: Classical music

Ownership
- Owner: RTBF
- Sister stations: La Première, VivaCité, Classic 21, Tipik

History
- First air date: 1 October 1961 (as Troisième Programme)

Links
- Website: Musiq'3

Musiq'3 is a Belgian public-service radio station operated by RTBF. Its output is centred on classical music. The current director is Bernard Meillat.

The channel first went on air – as the Troisième Programme of the then existing RTB (Radio-télévision belge, RTB) – on 1 October 1961. Later known as Radio Trois in the late 1970s and Musique 3 in October 1994, the channel's present branding, Musiq'3, was adopted in March 2004 as part of the overall restructuring of RTBF's radio services which took place in that year.

== Reception ==
=== FM ===
- Ardennes and Luxembourg: 94.1
- Brussels and Walloon Brabant: 91.2
- Charleroi: 97.1
- Chimay: 91.6
- Hainaut: 102.6
- La Louvière and Binche: 97.9
- La Roche-en-Ardenne: 97.6
- Mons: 88.5
- Liège: 99.5
- Namur and Basse-Sambre: 92.8
- Tubize and Braine-le-Château: 94.0

=== DAB ===
Broadcasting only in DAB+, Common AudioID : 6353 @ 96kb

- Bruxelles & Brabant Wallon
  - Bloc 6D - 187.072 MHz
- Liège
  - Bloc 6B - 183.648 MHz
- Namur & Sud Luxembourg
  - Bloc 6C - 185.360 MHz
- Hainaut & Nord Pas de Calais (France)
  - Bloc 6A - 181.936 MHz

=== Satellite ===
- Hot Bird 9 13.0°E – 10.930 H, DVB-S2, 8PSK SR: 30000 FEC: 2/3, (encrypted) Audio: 114

=== Digital terrestrial television ===
- UHF channel 45, 56 and 66

=== Internet ===
- http://www.rtbf.be/radio/liveradio/musiq3

== On demand content ==
Programmes available on demand from Musiq'3 are:

- Appassionato
- Autour De Babel
- Carnet Da Notes
- Concerts
- En Scene
- Le Feuilleton
- Hamlet
- Indicatif Présent
- Info Culturelle
- Jazz
- Journees speciales
- Le Passe Compose
- Les Classiques De Demain
- Musiq'Academies
- Musique Et Autres Muses
- Musiques De Film
- Plein-Jeu
- Reperes
- Si ça Vous Chante
- Table D'écoute
- Terre De Sons

== Logos ==
Musiq'3 first logo from 2004 to 2015.

Musiq'3 second logo from 2015 to 2025.

== See also ==
- Classic 21
- La Première
- Tipik
- VivaCité
