= Flemish Secession hoax =

2006 Belgian hoax

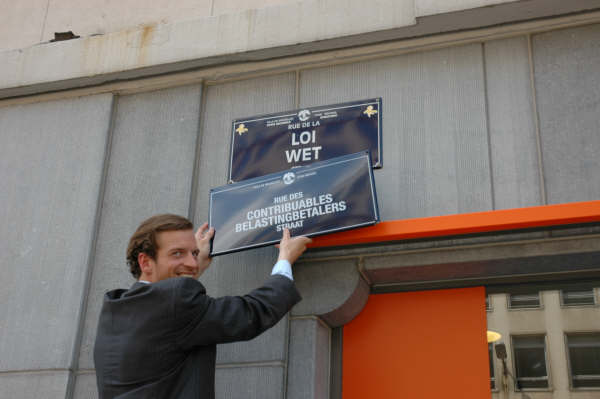
Geoffroy Coomans de Brachène holding the street sign Rue des contribuables/Belastingsbetalers straat (taxpayers' street) in Brussels

Tout ça (ne nous rendra pas la Belgique) or Bye Bye Belgium, also called "The Flemish Secession Hoax," was a hoax perpetrated by the French-language Belgian public TV station RTBF on Wednesday, December 13, 2006. Regular programming on the channel La Une was interrupted for a news bulletin claiming that the Flemish parliament had issued a unilateral declaration of independence from the Kingdom of Belgium, mimicking the Belgian secession from the Netherlands some 175 years earlier.

Interviews with prominent Belgian politicians (some of whom had been informed about the hoax) as well as staged footage of the evacuation of the royal family as well as cheering crowds holding the Flag of Flanders were included so as to add credence to the news report.

The broadcast of the report led to widespread alarm and consternation in French-speaking Belgium. A hotline set up by the station was swamped by 2,600 calls, whilst RTBF's website crashed. Thirty minutes into the broadcast, on demand of the media minister of the French-speaking community in Belgium, Fadila Laanan, an on-screen message identified it as fiction.

The hoax was the creation of the journalist Philippe Dutilleul and had been prepared over a period of 2 years under the codename BBB for Bye-bye Belgium. Its goal was to show Belgians the intensity of the country's issue, and the real possibility of a split of Belgium. In the years coming to the hoax there was rising Flemish separatism and the Vlaams Belang party received strong support in the regional elections.

Prominent Belgian politicians, including Prime Minister Guy Verhofstadt, Flemish Minister-President Yves Leterme and Walloon Minister-President Elio Di Rupo, condemned the report as "irresponsible." International reaction included an angry statement by Jean-Claude Juncker, Prime Minister of Luxembourg, who said, "This is not the kind of issue you play around with."

== See also ==
- Partition of Belgium
