= Hakima Darhmouch =

Belgian journalist

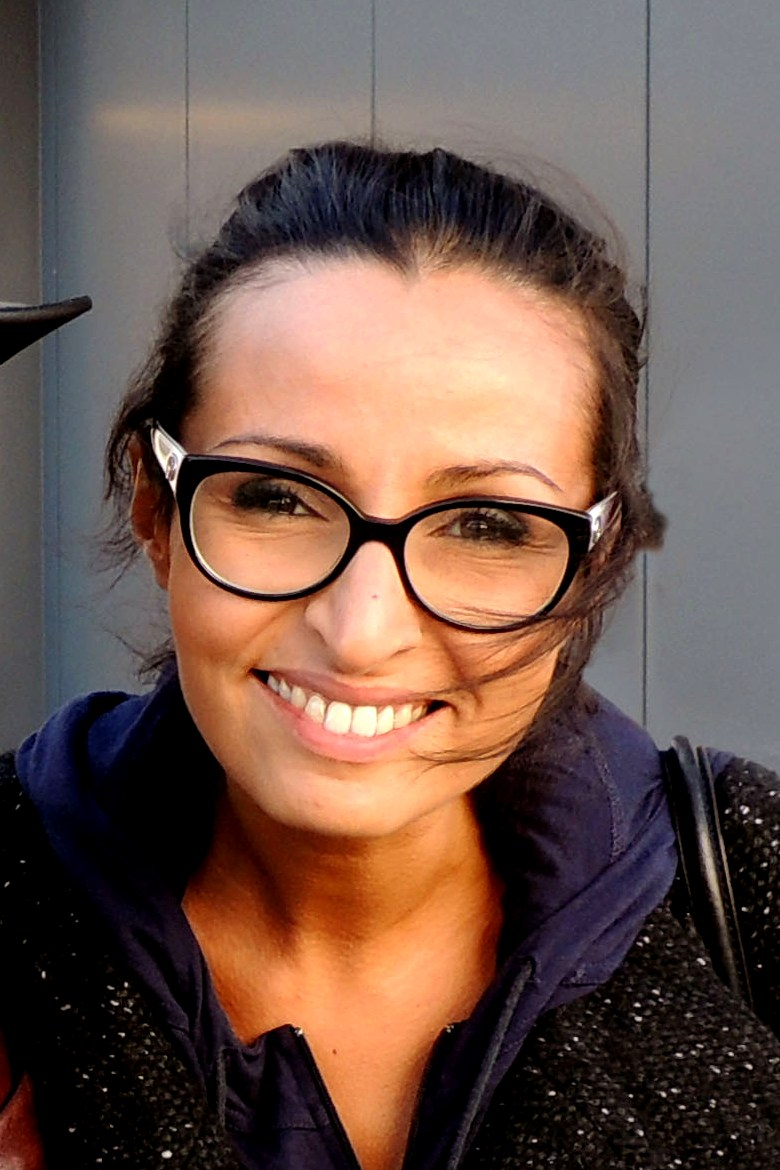
- Darhmouch in 2012
- Born: April 2, 1978 (age 48); Saint-Josse-ten-Noode
- Education: Institut Supérieur de formation sociale et de communication
- Occupation: TV news anchor

Hakima Darhmouch is a Belgian journalist born on April 2, 1978, in Saint-Josse-ten-Noode, Brussels to Moroccan parents. She works on RTL-TVI, a private French-language television station for Belgium.

== Early life ==
Hakima went to nursery school and spent half of her primary school years at the number 14 primary school in Schaerbeek. From that time Hakima remembers her regular attendance at school, despite her young age, and also a certain number of values inculcated in the family, in particular the love of learning.

== Education ==
She registered at ISFC (Institut Supérieur de formation sociale et de communication), where she studied communication.

In the course of her studies, encouraged by her lecturers, she did an internship at Nostalgie and Bel RTL, both private Belgian radio stations, broadcasting in Wallonia and Brussels, which gave her the chance to interview personalities such as Patrick Timsit (her first interview), Valérie Lemercier, Marc Lavoine or Gérard Lanvin.

In September 2014, in parallel with her journalist and TV news anchor jobs, she returned to school to do a degree in Executive Management at the Solvay School of Economics and Management.

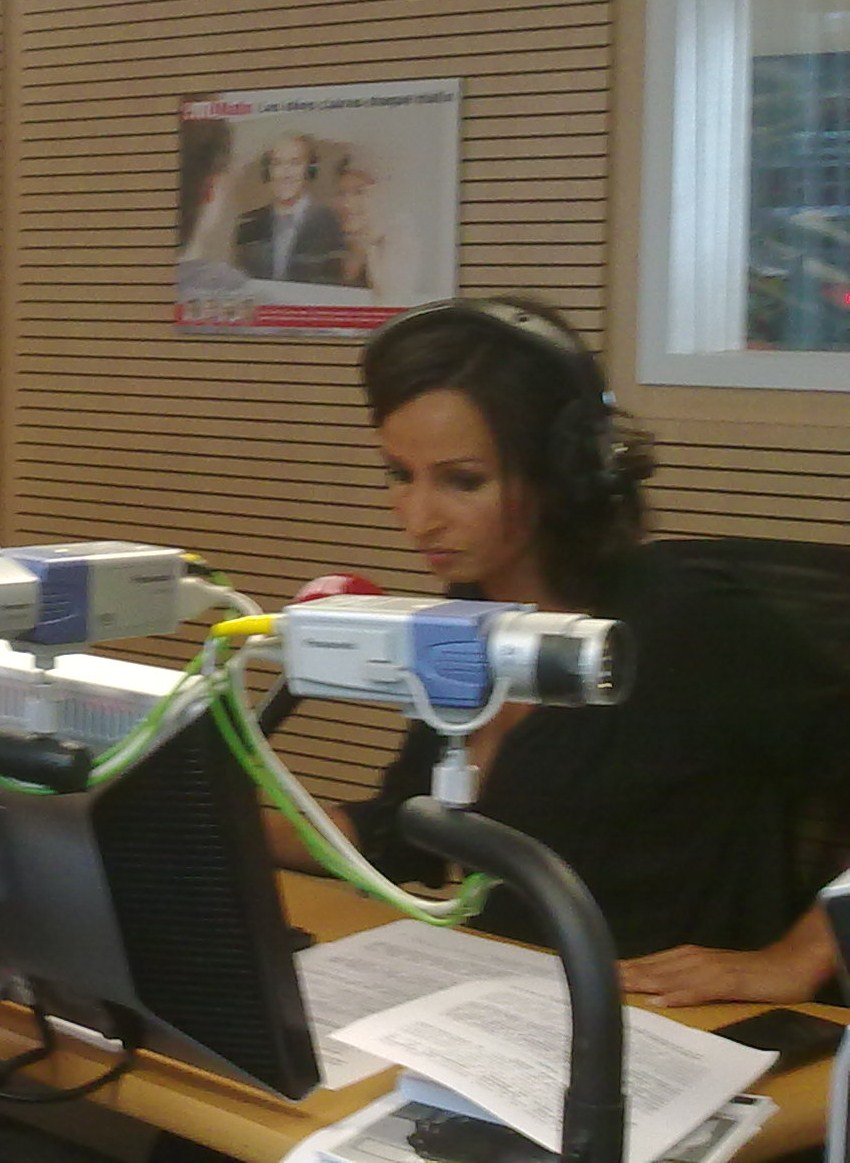
Darhmouch at RTL-TVI, 2010

She graduated on June 30, 2015.

== Early career ==
She joined RTL in 1999 and started out on Bel RTL by presenting the weather and traffic information. Then she joined RTL TVI first as a reporter in Belgium, but also overseas. Her first link-up took place on August 8, 2001.

Then she presented shows on RTL TVI such as Entrée interdite, a programme that was broadcast in the summer. She presented it for 3 seasons and gave up her seat to Micheline Thienpont because presenting the news took a lot of her time.

On May 28, 2006, she presented TV news for the first time. Since then she has alternated presenting the news with field work.

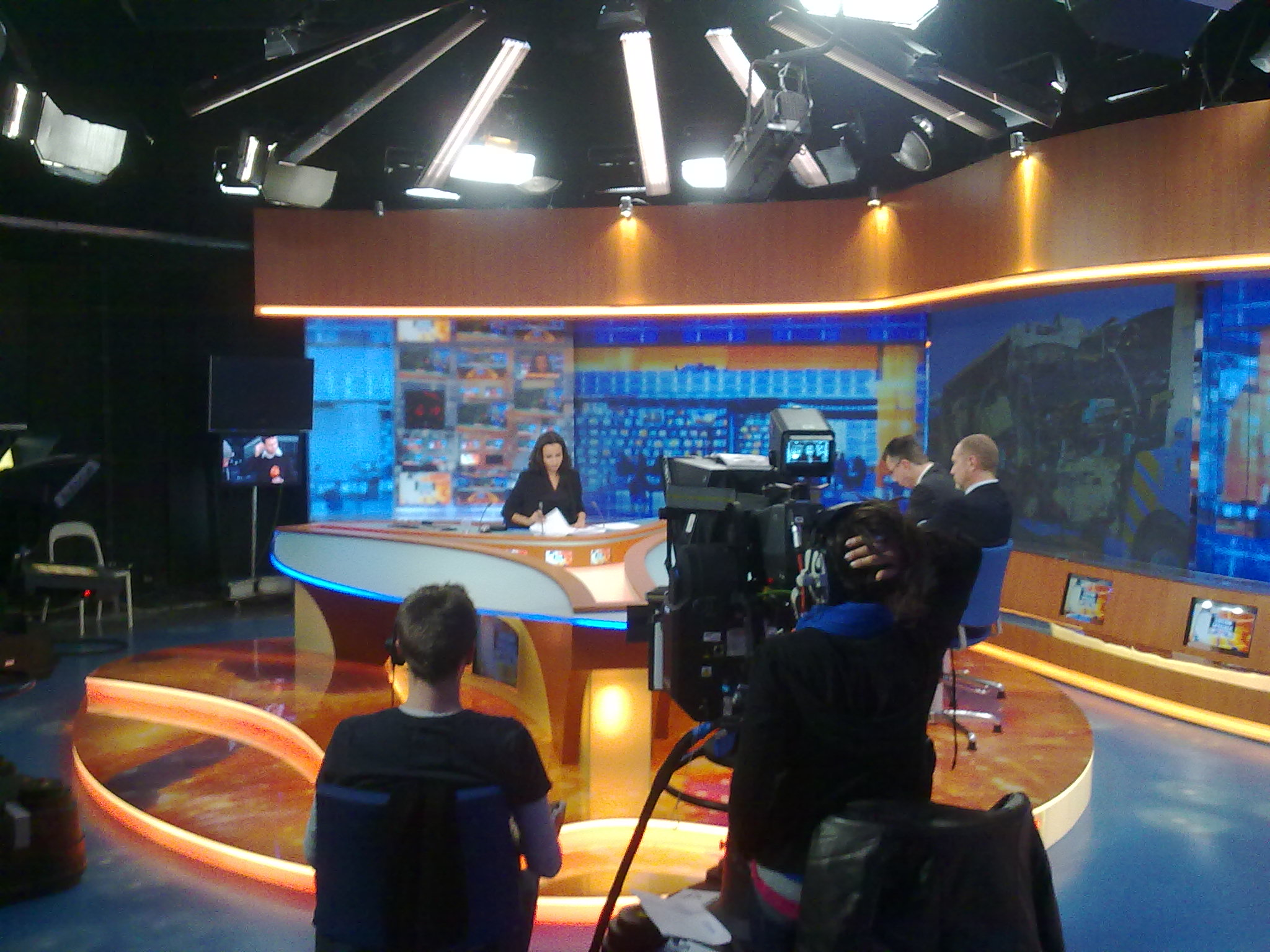
Darhmouch at the news table on RYL-TVI, 2012

== Political invitation ==
Hakima Darhmouch was the spokeswoman and communications adviser of Louis Michel, the Minister of State, member of the liberal party MR.

According to La Dernière Heure, a Belgian newspaper, the liberal party MR proposed Hakima Darhmouch to be on the electoral roll in April/May 2010, but also to be eventually a minister. A phone call with Didier Reynders, the liberal party president at that time, did not convince her to enter politics.
