= Pure (Belgian radio station) =

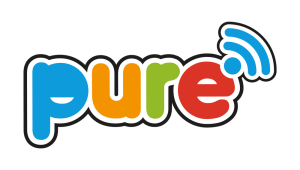

Belgium
- Broadcast area: Brussels and Wallonia
- Frequency: See list

Programming
- Language: French
- Format: Pop and rock

Ownership
- Owner: RTBF

History
- First air date: 1 April 2004
- Last air date: 6 September 2020
- Former names: Radio 21 (1981–2004); Pure FM (2004–2017)

Links
- Website: purefm.be

Pure was a Belgian public radio station created in 2004, focused on music genres such as pop, rock, hip hop, contemporary R&B, and electronic. It was operated by the Radio télévision belge de la communauté française (RTBF) and was the French-language equivalent of the Flemish Studio Brussel.

== History ==
On 1 April 2004, the public rock/pop radio station Radio 21 owned by the RTBF stopped broadcasting to be replaced by two new radio stations, Classic 21 and Pure FM. In 2010, Pure FM changed its logo. In January 2017, the station dropped the "FM" suffix from its name.

From 7 September 2020, Pure FM merged with La Deux, RTBF's second channel, to form a new brand for young people called Tipik. Tipik is available on TV as a channel replacing La Deux, on radio replacing Pure FM, and online.

== Reception ==
=== FM ===
Region	Frequency
Antwerp*	101.1 MHz
Arlon	98.4 MHz
Brussels (city)	88.8 MHz
Charleroi	96.6 MHz
Courtray*	90.6 MHz
Ghent*	101.1 MHz
Hainaut	90.6, 96.6 MHz
Huy	91.4 MHz
Léglise	89.9 MHz
Liège	92.5 MHz
Lille*	90.6 MHz
Luxembourg City*	98.4 MHz
Maastricht*	94.1, 101.1 MHz
Marche-en-Famenne	97.8 MHz
Namur (city)	89.8 MHz
Spa	94.1 MHz
Tournai	90.6 MHz
Verviers	87.9 MHz
Waremme	87.8 MHz
Walloon Brabant, Wavre	101.1 MHz

(*) The RTBF does not broadcast in this region or country, but can be heard there clearly.

=== AM ===
Region	Frequency
(Liège Province) Liège	1233 kHz
(Luxembourg (Belgium)) Luxembourg	1305 kHz

=== DAB ===
Region	Frequency
Wallonia (incl. Brussels)	RTBF Channel 12B (225,648 kHz)

== See also ==
- RTBF
- List of radio stations in Belgium
- Classic 21
- Studio Brussel
