= Barbara Mertens =

Belgian journalist and television presenter (1968–2021)

- Born: 21 May 1968; Uccle, Belgium
- Died: 4 June 2021 (aged 53)
- Occupations: Journalist; Television Presenter

Barbara Mertens (21 May 1968 – 4 June 2021) was a Belgian journalist and television presenter.

== Biography ==
Mertens earned her license in journalism from the Université libre de Bruxelles and became Editor-in-Chief of the radio network Bel RTL in 2009 and presented the program Bel-RTL Matin weekly alongside Thomas Van Hamme until 2014. She then presented the program with Pascal Vrebos. She also presented television programs with RTL-TVI.

Barbara Mertens died on 4 June 2021 at the age of 53.
