= Classic 21 =

Coordinates: 50°51′7.24″N 4°24′9.94″E

- Mons; Belgium
- Frequencies: 93.2 MHz (Brussels); 90.8 MHz (Namur); 99,1 MHz (Charleroi/Mons); 104.6 MHz (Tournai/Nord-Pas-de-Calais, France); 95.6 MHz (Liège/Verviers); 87.6 MHz (Ardennes/Luxembourg)

Programming
- Language: French

Ownership
- Owner: RTBF
- Sister stations: La Première; Tipik; Musiq'3; VivaCité

History
- First air date: April 1, 2004
- Former call signs: Radio 21 (1983–2004)

Links
- Website: classic21.be

Classic 21 is a Belgian public FM radio station, part of the RTBF broadcasting organisation. The station, based in Mons, was the only Classic rock radio in Belgium until 2008 when they switched to adult-contemporary and pop. The station plays predominantly B-side and obscure Anglophone music of the 1960s to 1990s for a French-speaking audience across Wallonia and Brussels and beyond.

== History ==
Classic 21 was created in 2004, at the same time as Pure FM, in replacing Radio 21. Marc Ysaye, once best known as the drummer with Machiavel and Burning Plague, was the controller of the station from its creation until an emotional last broadcast on 18 December 2022, playing out with Jeff Buckley's version of Hallelujah and a snatch of the Beatles' The End with the message the love you take is equal to the love you make.

Ysaye, great-grandson of composer-violinist Eugène Ysaÿe, had become an established feature on Radio 21 with his Sunday morning's Show "Les Classiques du dimanche matin", a show which continues on Classic 21 featuring 1960's-1980's music. Another Radio 21 show to have been carried across to Classic 21 is Walter de Paduwa's 'Doctor Boogie' which has been featuring upbeat blues, boogie and zydeco music since 1994 - every show starting with a track by Canned Heat.

== Logos ==
Classic 21 second logo from 2015 to 2025.

== Market share ==
Classic 21 reached 9% of the Belgian Francophone market share in 2016.
