= Vitebsk TV Tower =

- Віцебск тэлевізійная вежа
- Location within Belarus

General information
- Status: Completed
- Type: Steel lattice television tower
- Location: Vitebsk, Vitebsk Region, Belarus
- Coordinates: 55°11′36.03″N 30°9′59.37″E
- Construction started: 1983
- Completed: 1983

Height
- Height: 245 m (804 ft)

Vitebsk Television Tower (Belarusian: Віцебская тэлевізійная вежа, romanized: Viciebskaja telievizijnaja vieža), also known as Viciebsk, Vitsebsk or Vitsyebsk TV Tower, is a 245 m (804 ft) tall steel Belarusian lattice television tower that is located in the city of Vitebsk, in Belarus, thus the name. Having been built in 1983 as a unique, multi-purpose television tower, the Vitebsk TV Tower is utilized for transmitting FM-/TV-broadcasting throughout the city.

Having a unique design, the tower is a free-standing lattice structure built with a horizontal cross on which the antenna mast is anchored. In relation to this, the television tower resembles the appearance of the Grodno TV Tower, albeit the latter being the taller one, gaining a height of 254 m (833 ft). In contrast, the Vitebsk TV Tower has a lesser total height of 245 m (804 ft), with a difference of 9 m (30 ft) in the two towers' height and stature.

== History ==
The Vitebsk Television Tower's construction started and concluded at the same year in 1983. Just like its taller resemblance, the tower's completion benefited numerous citizens in the whole of the area as the television tower transmits FM-/TV-broadcasting throughout the city of Vitebsk up until today. To sum up, the tower has served its very purpose for a total of 29 years.

== Geography ==
The Vitebsk Television Tower is situated in the city of Vitebsk, which in turn serves as the capital of the Vitebsk Region and is the fourth-largest city of the whole of Belarus. Its taller resemblance, the Grodno TV Tower, lies in the city of Grodno, thus the name.

=== Vitebsk ===
Vitebsk, also known as Viciebsk, Vitsebsk or Vitsyebsk (Belarusian: Ві́цебск, Łacinka: Viciebsk, pronounced [ˈvʲitsʲepsk]; Russian: Ви́тебск, pronounced [ˈvʲitʲɪpsk]; Polish: Witebsk, Yiddish: וויטעבסק, romanized: Vitebsk, Lithuanian: Vitebskas), is a city in Belarus, near the border with Russia. Currently the capital of the Vitebsk Oblast, the city had 342,381 inhabitants in 2004, making it the country's fourth-largest city. Its airways are secured and served by the Vitebsk Vostochny Airport and Vitebsk air base.

== See also ==
- Lattice tower
- Grodno TV Tower
- Vitebsk
- Vitebsk Region
