= BRF1 =

Belgium
- Frequency: See list

Programming
- Language: German
- Format: Generalist

Ownership
- Owner: Belgischer Rundfunk
- Sister stations: BRF2, BRF-DLF

History
- Former names: BRF

Links
- Website: http://1.brf.be/

BRF1 is the first national radio station for the German community of Belgium, owned by Belgischer Rundfunk.

== Location ==
BRF has three sites, its headquarters in the town of Eupen and studios in Brussels and Saint Vith.

== History ==
BRF1 was created in 2001, after it was decided to split the BRF Radio into BRF1 for pop and rock music while BRF2 airs traditional and folk music, along with the creation of a joint venture between BRF and Deutschlandfunk, namely BRF-DLF in Brussels.

== Reception ==
BRF1 can be received via FM radio, DAB radio, Cable and xDSL providers and online

=== FM reception ===
Region	Town	Frequency in MHz
German Community	Lontzen & Welkenraedt	89.0
German Community	Eupen	94.9
German Community	Recht	94.9
German Community	Aubel	92.2
Wallonia Region	Liege	88.5
Wallonia Region	Namur	97.7
Brussels Region	Brussels	95.2

=== DAB reception ===
Region	Multiplex name	Site(s)	Block	Frequency in MHz	Standard	Audio type	Bitrate	MOT
Brussels	Bruxelles 2	Brussels Finance Tower (4.6 kW)	6D	187.072	DAB+	Stereo	48 kbps	Yes
Flemish Brabant	Bruxelles 2	Sint-Pieters-Leeuw (1.3 kW)	6D	187.072	DAB+	Stereo	48 kbps	Yes
Hainaut	Bruxelles 2	Ronquières (1.3 kW)	6D	187.072	DAB+	Stereo	48 kbps	Yes
Brabant Wallon	Bruxelles 2	Wavre (1.7 kW)	6D	187.072	DAB+	Stereo	48 kbps	Yes
Wallonia	Liège 2	Avernas (1.8 kW)	6B	183.648	DAB+	Stereo	48 kbps	Yes
Wallonia	Liège 2	Bol d'Air (3.5 kW)	6B	183.648	DAB+	Stereo	48 kbps	Yes
Wallonia	Liège 2	Malmédy Bernister (1.2 kW)	6B	183.648	DAB+	Stereo	48 kbps	Yes
Wallonia	Liège 2	Spa Spaloumont (1.6 kW)	6B	183.648	DAB+	Stereo	48 kbps	Yes
Wallonia	Liège 2	Verviers Diston (1 kW)	6B	183.648	DAB+	Stereo	48 kbps	Yes
Wallonia	Liège 2	Vielsalm Fracture (1.3 kW)	6B	183.648	DAB+	Stereo	48 kbps	Yes
Wallonia	Namur & Luxembourg 2	Bouillon (1.1 kW)	6C	185.360	DAB+	Stereo	48 kbps	Yes
Wallonia	Namur & Luxembourg 2	Couvin (2.7 kW)	6C	185.360	DAB+	Stereo	48 kbps	Yes
Wallonia	Namur & Luxembourg 2	La Roche-en-Ardennes (2.7 kW)	6C	185.360	DAB+	Stereo	48 kbps	Yes
Wallonia	Namur & Luxembourg 2	Léglise Anlier (4.8 kW)	6C	185.360	DAB+	Stereo	48 kbps	Yes
Wallonia	Namur & Luxembourg 2	Marche Aye (2.7 kW)	6C	185.360	DAB+	Stereo	48 kbps	Yes
Wallonia	Namur & Luxembourg 2	Namur Centre (1.6 kW)	6C	185.360	DAB+	Stereo	48 kbps	Yes
Wallonia	Namur & Luxembourg 2	Profondeville (3.1 kW)	6C	185.360	DAB+	Stereo	48 kbps	Yes

=== DVB-T as an Audio only service ===
Region	Target Area	Site	Frequency in MHz	UHF Channel	Polarisation
Brussels Region	Brussels	Finance Tower	754	56	V
Brabant	Wavre	Industrial Zone	754	56	H
Occidental Hainaut	Tournai	Froidmont, Marquain	754	56	V
Oriental Hainaut	Anderlues	Mont-Sainte-Geneviève	754	56	H
Namur Province	Profondeville	Godinne (7 Meuses)	754	56	H
Namur Town	Namur	Production site of the RTBF	754	56	H
Liège	Liège	Noncelles (Bol d'Air)	666	45	H
Luxembourg Region	Léglise	Vlessart	762	57	H
La Riche-en-Ardenne	La Roche	Nord	762	57	H
Famenne	Marche	Ayve, Marloie	762	57	H
Couvin	Couvin	Petigny	698	49	H
Malmedy and Stavelot	Malmedy	Bernister	642	42	H

=== Cable and xDSL Providers ===
Region	Provider	Technology	Channel number
Brussels	Proximus	xDSL	840
Flanders	Proximus	xDSL	840
Wallonia	Proximus	xDSL	840
Brussels	VOO	DVB-C	425
Wallonia	VOO	DVB-C	425
Brussels	Orange	DVB-C	901
Flanders	Orange	DVB-C	901
Wallonia	Orange	DVB-C	901
Brussels	Telenet	DVB-C	915
Flanders	Telenet	DVB-C	935
Wallonia	Telenet	DVB-C	935
Brussels	SFR	DVB-C	
Flanders	SFR	DVB-C	
Hainaut	SFR	DVB-C	

== See also ==
- List of radio stations in Belgium
