= Ophélie Fontana =

Belgian television news presenter

Ophélie Fontana (born 15 July 1979) is a Belgian television news presenter for RTBF.
