= Grodno TV Tower =

Coordinates: 53°42′06″N 23°49′18″E

- Location within Belarus

General information
- Status: Completed
- Type: Steel lattice television tower
- Location: Grodno, Belarus
- Completed: 1984

Height
- Height: 254 m (833 ft)

Grodno TV Tower, also known as the Hrodna TV Tower, is a 254 metre tall lattice tower at Grodno, Belarus, built in 1984 of a unique design. The upper section of the tower is guyed using four horizontal crossbars fixed on the main body of the tower extending out from it about two-thirds of the way up the tower. Only three other towers are known to have been built of a similar design all within a three year period. They are the Wavre Transmitter, the Astara TV Tower and the Vitebsk TV Tower, the Grodno TV Tower is the tallest of the four. The Wavre Transmitter is the only one of which was built outside of the Soviet Union.

Grodno TV Tower is used for FM and TV broadcasting.

A nearly identical but a few metres lower tower is at Vitebsk.

== Transmitted programmes ==
Frequency	Programme
66,20 MHz	Канал Культура
66,98 MHz	1-я программа Беларуского Радио + Радио Гродно
67,72 MHz	Радио Гродно
68,90 MHz	Радио Столица
95,70 MHz	Радио Би-Эй
100,5 MHz	Радио Столица
101,2 MHz	Радио Гродно
102,1 MHz	ПИЛОТ-ФМ
103,0 MHz	1-я программа Беларуского Радио + Радио Гродно
106,9 MHz	Русское Радио + Радио РОКС.

== See also ==
- Lattice tower
