= Radio Contact (Eupen) =

Radio Contact Ostbelgien Now
- Belgium
- Broadcast area: Eupen
- Frequencies: Eupen 107.0 MHz; Signal de Botrange 98.0 MHz

Programming
- Language: German
- Format: Generalist

Ownership
- Owner: Cobel D AG
- Sister stations: Radio Contact (Belgium)

History
- First air date: November 1995
- Former call signs: Radio Hermann in Raeren, Radio Aktivität

Links
- Webcast: https://s1.dh-media.net:17000/
- Website: http://www.radiocontactnow.be/

Radio Contact Ostbelgien Now is a German language version of the French speaking radio station Radio Contact broadcasting to the German-speaking Community of Belgium.

== History ==
Started in 1981 as a Radio Hermann in Raeren near a train station in an improvised studio in an attic for the first few months. Soon after the station moved to Eupen and was renamed to "Radio Aktivität". Under this name the station developed and fairly quickly became the largest and most popular local radio station of the German Community.

In 1987 its first "real" commercial was aired. In collaboration with the Grenz-Echo, in 1986 it launched local news, which were quickly supplemented by World news. After the radio landscape developed rapidly in eastern Belgium in the early 90s, Radio Aktivität decided to look for a strong partner, and so in November 1995 Radio Contact Eupen was born. Completely independent broadcast from the Aachener Strasse in Eupen from the German-speaking produced program one of the most successful Belgian commercial broadcaster.

In December 2000, the corporation Cobel D was created, which produces the German-language program of Radio Contact Eupen. Since May 2002, the station can also be heard in the south of the German-speaking Community.

Today Radio Contact Ostbelgien Now, is one of the most listened private ward throughout the German-speaking community.

== Studio ==
"Studio 2" and not "Studio 1" is: There is for everything a logical explanation:

Studio 1 is the production studio. It was as if it did not exist Studio 2 once long, long ago, there was Studio 1 broadcast studio.

As the size of the station grew it then moved from Studio 2 to go ON AIR.

== Technology ==
It has a digital archive of nearly 12,000 titles. The "best mix" consists of approximately 1,900 titles that are exchanged regularly.

Most of the music is from the 80's and 90's. In addition, of course, the hits from 2000 and many current titles.

Everything that goes ON AIR comes from a hard disk. Only the CD of the week is actually a CD.

Broadcasts are all managed by the presenters themselves, that there is no technician. Since 2019, Grenz-Echo holds 51% of the shares of Radio Contact Ostbelgien Now.
