= Thomas Van Hamme =

Belgian television presenter

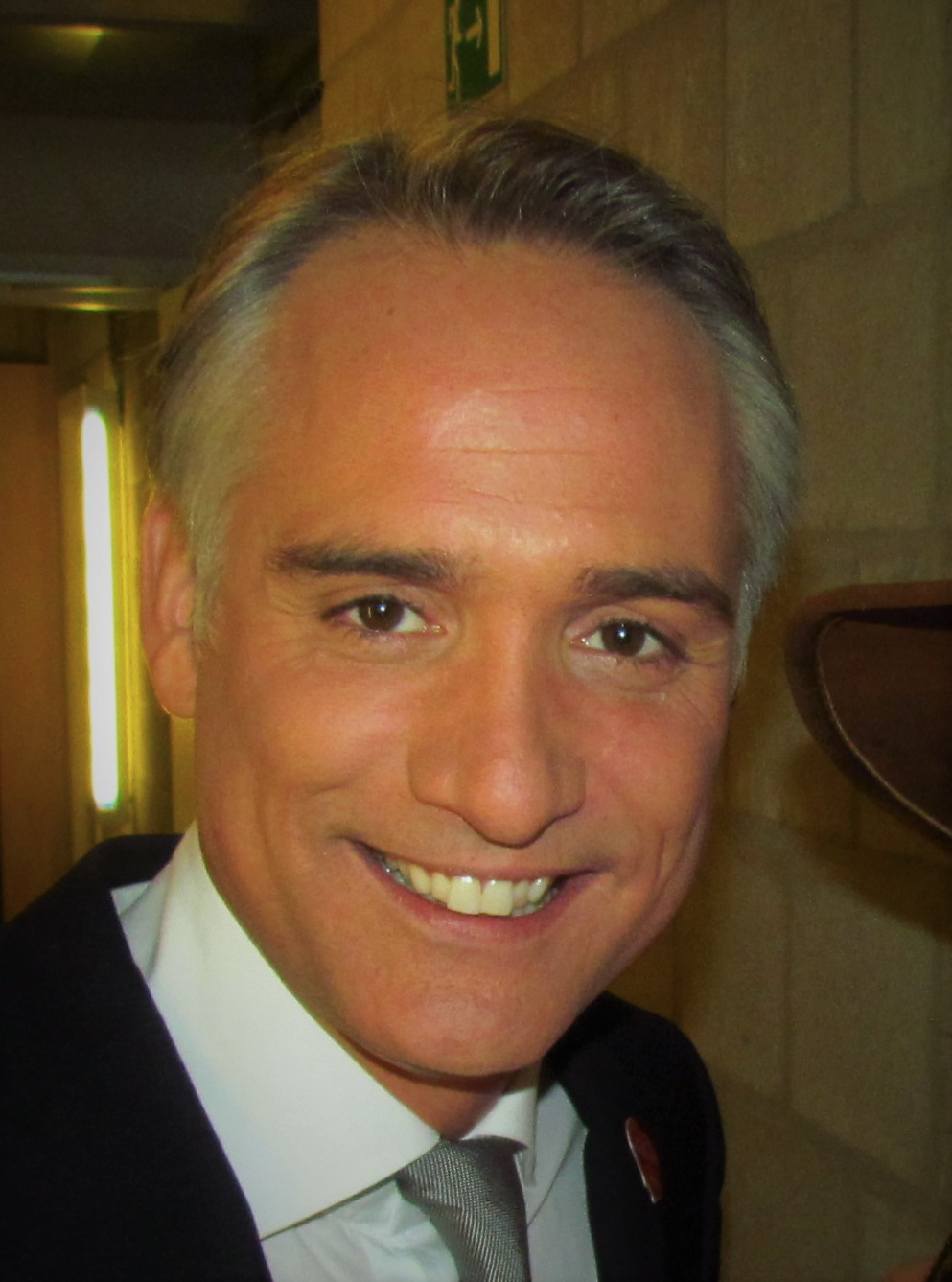
- Thomas Van Hamme in 2012.
- Born: 10 February 1969 (age 57); Brussels
- Occupation: broadcaster

Thomas Van Hamme (born 10 February 1969) is a radio and TV moderator of the Walloon Broadcaster RTBF. He is currently in the prime time broadcast on the scientific GpiG A, but with Barbara Louys, It's Belgian magazine devoted to the Belgian monarchy and everything that makes excellence in Belgium. In radio, he leads the morning Viva Brussels (6h - 8:30) and the talk show of A View (8:40–9 am) on VivaCité.

In 2000, he gave the votes from the Belgian televote for the Eurovision Song Contest 2000 held in Stockholm, Sweden. He is the second son of Belgian comic book writer Jean Van Hamme.
