= 100.5 Das Hitradio =

100,5 Das Hitradio
- Eupen; Belgium
- Broadcast area: Meuse–Rhine Euroregion
- Frequencies: 100.5 MHz (Eupen / Aachen / South Limburg / Verviers / Liège); 107.6 MHz (Sankt Vith / Malmedy / Belgium Eifel); DAB Block 8A; East Cantons

Programming
- Language: German
- Format: Generalist

Ownership
- Owner: Belgischer Rundfunk

History
- First air date: 19 October 1998

Technical information
- Power: 20 kW
- HAAT: 60m
- Transmitter coordinates: 50°39′13″N 6°10′09″E

Links
- Website: https://www.dashitradio.de/

100,5 Das Hitradio is a radio station from Eupen, a town in the German-speaking part of Belgium. The station has been on the air since 1998 and broadcasts under the motto: "Die Super Hits der 80er, der 90er und das Beste von heute" (The Super Hits of the 80s, the 90s, and the Best of Today").

The station is owned by 40.8% by the BRF Medien AG in Eupen, 39.2% by Radio Salü in Saarbrücken, Germany, 10% by PFD Pressefunk GmbH.

== Listeners ==
Target audience is about 1.1 million German-speaking people in the area of transmission between the age of 29 and 45. More than 400,000 people listen daily to 100.5 Das Hitradio. This station is the most listened to station in the German-speaking region and in southwestern North Rhine-Westphalia.

== Programmes ==
100.5 plays the music mix of the most popular pop and rock songs of the last decades ("The Super Hits of the 80s, 90s and the best of today"). Every 30 minutes 100.5 airs a live newscast, these newscasts begin 5 minutes earlier than the other radio stations ( "immer fünf Minuten früher informiert" ), with the extensive newscasts at 12:25 and 17:25 daily for the region "Total Euregional". In general, the newscast's content is regional and national themes in equal proportions.

Political and social information broadcasts of this type are aired five minutes before the hour (for example 13:55) and five minutes before the half hour (e.g., 14:25). During broadcast hours, 100.5 focuses on service, music and entertainment contributions. In addition, the station transmits all the games of football Sports Teams Borussia Mönchengladbach and Alemannia Aachen live.

"Von zwei bis frei", from 10:55 to 18:00, plays varied music from the 80s until the present day.

Every night from 18:00 (Mon-Thu until 20:00 and Fri-Sat until 0:00) "In the Mix" airs a nonstop mix of songs from the 80s, 90s and today. Mixed by "Star DJ Enrico Ostendorf".

Every Sunday there is also the "100,5 Top 20 Chart Show" from 16:00-17:40. That is the top 20 of the station compiled by the listeners. This program is also presented by Enrico Ostendorf.

== Reception ==
The Meuse-Rhine is 100,5 receive anywhere on 100.50 MHz FM. The stations RDS ident is: * * 100,5.

Cable Frequencies: Aachen, Aldenhoven, Alsdorf, Baesweiler, Bedburg, Bergheim, Düren, Elsdorf, Eschweiler, Geilenkirchen, Heinsberg, Hellenthal, Herzogenrath, Hürtgenwald, Inden, Jülich, Kall, Kerpen, Kreuzau, Langerwehe, Merzenich, Nideggen, Niederzier, Nörvenich, Schleiden, Stolberg, Titz, Übach-Palenberg en Würselen (104.60 MHz) until October 2023. in Belgium at 89.30 MHz. Because of the position of its FM antenna the station can be received in Eindhoven (The Netherlands).

== See also ==
- List of radio stations in Belgium
