= La Trois =

Belgian French-language television channel

- Country: Belgium

Ownership
- Owner: RTBF
- Sister channels: La Une, Tipik

History
- Launched: 30 November 2007; 18 years ago

Links
- Website: www.latrois.be

Availability

Terrestrial
- TNT: Wallonia & Brussels

La Trois (lit: The Three) is a Belgian national television channel operated by the French-language public-service broadcasting organisation RTBF. It was launched on 30 November 2007 and is distributed via digital terrestrial television, satellite, cable, and IPTV.

La Trois timeshares with Auvio Kids TV, a children block, between 6/9 am to 8 pm.

== History ==
La Trois was officially launched on 30 November 2007, with the launch of the RTBF DTT service. Initially, the channel was a copy of RTBF Sat, the international service. After the closure of RTBF Sat on 15 February 2010, La Trois kept the same programming until 25 September 2010, when it started to air its own programming, divided between the children channel Ouftivi during the day, replacing the long-lasting program Ici Bla-Bla from La Deux, and cultural programming after 8 pm.

On 28 August 2023, Ouftivi changed its name to Auvio Kids TV, following the name of RTBF's streaming platform.

== Analogue transmission ==
For a few years La Trois was broadcast from the Tournai transmitter on channel 60 in the UHF PAL system; however, this was phased out with the implementation of digitalisation.

== Programming ==
After its launch and prior to its major revamp in September 2010, its programming consists of reruns and live simulcasts coming from its main channels, La Une and La Deux and also original programming produced for this channel. It also broadcast movies, cultural programming and even documentaries during prime time.

La Trois's programming was identical to that of the now defunct channel, RTBF Sat: live simulcasts and only reruns of programmes produced by the RTBF, but continues the same programming as what was on RTBF Sat except sports.

Since September 2010, when RTBF Sat ceased transmission on 15 February 2010, La Trois produces its own programming and became a public-service channel where they do not broadcast advertising, as RTBF Sat and unlike the first two channels, La Une and La Deux. La Trois also broadcasts children's programmes, movies and series in the original language with French subtitles, documentaries, archives, JT with sign language and reruns.

A transition program took place between 15 February 2010 and 25 September 2010, when La Trois had its own programming. "This programming consists mainly of youth and some of cultural programming," said François Tron in an interview on the 13:00 edition of Journal Télévisé on La Une on 23 August 2010. Among children's programming, a newscast is specifically produced for children, Niouzz (similar to that of the British newscast produced by the BBC, Newsround).

Currently, La Trois's programming consists of children's & youth programming – branded OufTivi – during the day and during prime-time, it simulcasts the main news bulletin, JT 19h30 with La Une in sign language and later rebroadcast the news without sign language at 20:30, an hour after its live bulletin and also broadcasts cultural programming, documentaries and reruns. La Trois is also considered to be the equivalent to its Flemish counterparts, the 2 sub-channels, Ketnet (children's programming) and OP12 (cultural and youth programming).

== Logos and identities ==
La Trois logo from 30 November 2007 to 25 September 2010 and reintroduced in 1 September 2014 to 8 December 2025.

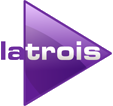
La Trois logo from 25 September 2010 to 1 September 2014.

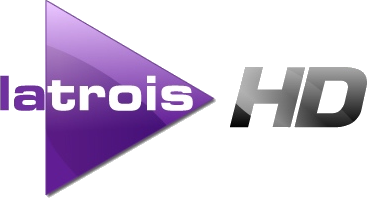
La Trois HD logo from 25 September 2010 to 1 September 2014.
