= Bruzz =

Belgian non-profit media company

Vlaams-Brusselse Media
- Trade name: Bruzz
- Industry: Media industry
- Predecessor: Brussel Deze Week; FM Brussel; Niet-openbare Regionale Televisievereniging Brussel
- Founded: March 10, 2014; 12 years ago
- Founders: Luc Demullier; Lydia Desloover; Ruben Goots; Stefanie Gryson; Simon Horsten; Marc Moerman; David Steegen; Jos Van Campenhout; Kristel Vandenbrande
- Headquarters: Flagey Building, Ixelles, Belgium
- Area served: Brussels-Capital Region
- Products: Bruzz radio; Bruzz Ice; Bruzz televisie; Bruzz.be; Bruzz Ket; Bruzz magazine; Bruzz culture
- Revenue: 2,276,887 (2015)
- Operating income: 10,565,677 (2015)
- Total assets: 3,824,854 (2015)
- Website: bruzz.be

Vlaams-Brusselse Media (Flemish-Brussels Media), shortened to VBM and operating under the brand Bruzz (stylised in all caps), is a non-profit media company dedicated to serving the Flemish Community in Brussels. A counterpart to BX1, which caters to the French-speaking Community in Brussels, Bruzz has its headquarters located at the Radio House in Ixelles.

== History ==
=== 1970–2014: Early years and pre-merger developments ===
Bruzz's origins can be traced to the monthly local newspaper Deze Maand in Brussel, which was founded in the 1970s by the Nederlandse Commissie voor de Cultuur van de Brusselse Agglomeratieraad with the aim of creating a Dutch-language newspaper for the residents of the Brussels Agglomeration. 1985, it underwent a name change to Deze Week in Brussel.

On 15 September 1993 the television channel TV-Brussel was inaugurated from the Royal Flemish Theatre.

In 1998, Deze Week in Brussel underwent another name change, becoming Brussel Deze Week, with Dirk Volckaerts assuming the role of editor-in-chief.

In 2002 a trilingual cultural supplement, initially named AGENDA and later Agenda Magazine, was introduced to Brussel Deze Week.

On 26 February 2000, FM BSSL was launched as a student radio affiliated with RITCS. On 19 December 2003 the station received a 9-year license and, in May 2004, rebranded as FM Brussel.

In 2004, Brussel Deze Week expanded its reach by establishing the online news platform brusselnieuws.be, which also integrated content from TV-Brussel and FM Brussels. In 2008, Anne Brumagne assumed the role of editor-in-chief, and the newspaper underwent another transformation, being renamed BDW.

=== 2014–present: Post-merger period ===
On 10 March 2014 the entities governing brusselnieuws.be, tvbrussel, FM Brussel, Agenda Magazine and BDW merged to create Vlaams-Brusselse Media, headquartered in the historic Radio House in Ixelles. The new organization focused on producing web, radio and television content. Subsequently, on 13 October 2015, the Board of Directors of Vlaams-Brusselse Media announced a reorganization, prompted by a turbulent period after the previous CEO's announcement of resignations and the closure of FM Brussels.

On 20 April 2016, brusselnieuws.be, Tvbrussel, FM Brussels, Agenda Magazine and BDW ceased to exist as separate entities, giving way to the emergence of the cross-media brand Bruzz with a unified editorial team.

In 2018 Vlaams-Brusselse Media collaborated with Onderwijscentrum Brussel (OCB) to launch Bruzz Ket, a digital platform for children and youth. It targets Dutch-speaking and multilingual young people aged 9 to 13 in Brussels.

On 19 April 2022 Vlaams-Brusselse Media introduced Bruzz Ice a digital radio station.

== Editors-in-chief ==
Editor-in-chief	Time span
Jeroen Roppe	2015–2016
Klaus Van Isacker	2016–2017
Kristof Pitteurs	2017–2023
