= BRF TV =

German-language TV channel in Belgium

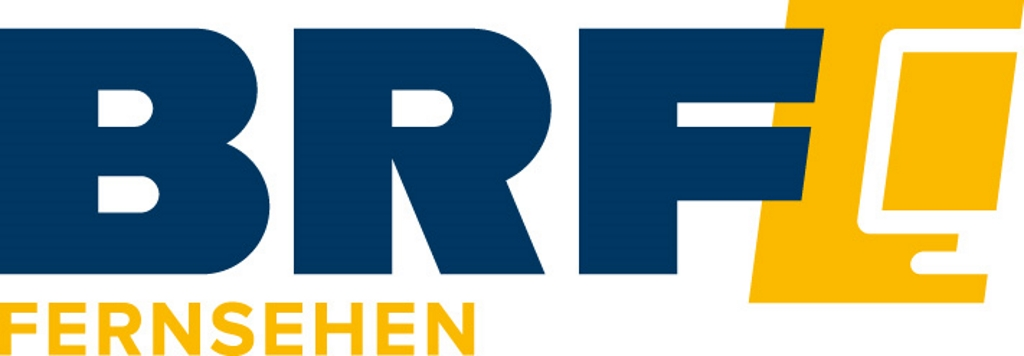
- Country: Belgium
- Broadcast area: German-speaking Community of Belgium

Programming
- Language: German

Ownership
- Owner: Belgischer Rundfunk

History
- Launched: 4 October 1999; 26 years ago
- Former names: KA3 (4 October 1999 – 4 October 2004)

Links
- Website: Official website

Availability

Terrestrial
- RTBF DVB-T Multiplex: Broadcast on Euronews from 18:45 to 21:45 CET

BRF TV (also known as BRF Fernsehen) is a German-language television channel in Belgium.

It is owned by the Belgian public broadcaster Belgischer Rundfunk and transmitted via cable in the German-speaking Community of Belgium and throughout the country via IPTV.

== History ==
Former logo (2004–2015)

BRF's television activity started in 1993 with the broadcast of a slot on the Verviersian local cable channel Télévesdre with the weekly investigation programme Maskerade, which was later added by the news and current affairs programme MAG.

On 4 October 1999, BRF created KA3 (for KAnal 3), renamed to the current name five years later, on 4 October 2004 as BRF-TV, a daily television programme produced and carried on cable in the German Community. The programme was made in co-operation with the Medienzentrum in Eupen and the Germanophone Community.

== Programming ==
- Blickpunkt: regional news program airs 15 minutes from Monday to Friday at 17:45, rebroadcast at 06:00 in the morning. This covers news, economic, cultural, political and sports in the region, followed by a weather report.
- Blick ins Inland: To meet the information needs of viewers on Belgian domestic politics, the BRF broadcasts the magazine every day with visuals from RTBF.
- Treffpunkt: Monday talk show produced by the press center of the German-speaking Community of Belgium and presented by the facilitators of the BRF.
- Fit & Gesund: program dedicated to health and well-being broadcast every second Thursday of the month in cooperation with the Ministry of Health of the German-speaking Community of Belgium.
- BRF-TV-Wochenrückblick: broadcast on Saturday at 12:45 and Sunday night at 22:45.
