= VivaCité =

Brussels; Belgium
- Broadcast area: Brussels and Wallonia

Programming
- Language: French

Ownership
- Owner: RTBF

History
- First air date: 29 February 2004

Links
- Website: VivaCité

VivaCité is a Belgian public service radio station operated by RTBF. The station launched on 29 February 2004 from the merger of regional network Fréquence Wallonie and Brussels station Bruxelles Capitale. VivaCité is the French-language equivalent of VRT Radio 2.

== Overview ==
VivaCité is a radio network, covering the French-speaking regions of Belgium, via six regional stations (Brussels, Charleroi, Hainaut, Liège, Namur/Luxembourg/Walloon Brabant). Its programming is a mix of adult contemporary music with personality-driven shows and sports coverage in the evenings. All six stations air local programming in the morning between 5:30 and 8:30 weekdays, with evening drive coming from four locations (Luxembourg and Charleroi air neighbouring stations' shows).

Radiolène, a station based in Verviers was absorbed into the VivaCité network. Radiolène was created in 1982 as an experimental local station. It was severely reduced in 2004 by the Magellan Plan re-organisation of public radio, then closed as an independent station with three morning opt-out news bulletins remaining as local output.

== Visual identity ==
=== Logos ===
VivaCité first logo from 2004 to 2025.

=== Slogans ===
- 2004: La nouvelle radio
- 2004-2006: On a plein de choses à se dire
- 2006: Au cœur de vos émotions
- 2007-2009: En toute complicité
- 2009: La radio complice
- 2009: Et la vie va!
- 2011: Ma radio complicité

== Reception ==
=== FM ===
VivaCité Brabant wallon

- Wavre: 97.3

VivaCité Bruxelles

- Brussels: 99.3

VivaCité Liège

- Liège: 90.5
- Malmedy: 91.6
- Spa: 94.6
- Verviers: 103.0
- Welkenraedt: 89.4

VivaCité Charleroi

- Charleroi: 92.3
- Chimay: 95.4

VivaCité Hainaut

- La Louvière: 99.5
- Mons: 97.1
- Hainaut: 101.8

VivaCité Namur

- Couvin: 94.2
- Namur (centre): 89.1
- Namur (province): 98.3

VivaCité Luxembourg

- Ardennes and Luxembourg: 91.5
- Bouillon: 98.1
- Houffalize: 91.8
- La Roche-en-Ardenne: 88.2
- Marche-en-Famenne: 95.2

=== AM ===
- 621 kHz - shared time with La Première, everyday between 20:00-23:00, within a radius of about 400 km (250 mi) from Wavre
- 1125 kHz - within a radius of about 100 km (62 mi) from La Louvière

=== DAB+ ===
Since the end of 2018, each local stations are available on DAB+ on their provincial block.

Until 2018, VivaCité was broadcast on DAB Block 12B (225.648 kHz). These were programmes that are broadcast by VivaCité Bruxelles which covers all of the French Community of Belgium.

=== Satellite ===
- Astra 19.2°E - 12343.50 H (encrypted) Audio: 137

=== Digital terrestrial television ===
- UHF channel 56, 66 and 45

=== Internet ===
- Listen to VivaCité

== See also ==
- Classic 21
- La Première
- Musiq'3
- Tipik
