= Wavre transmitter =

Coordinates: 50.7428°N 4.5841°E

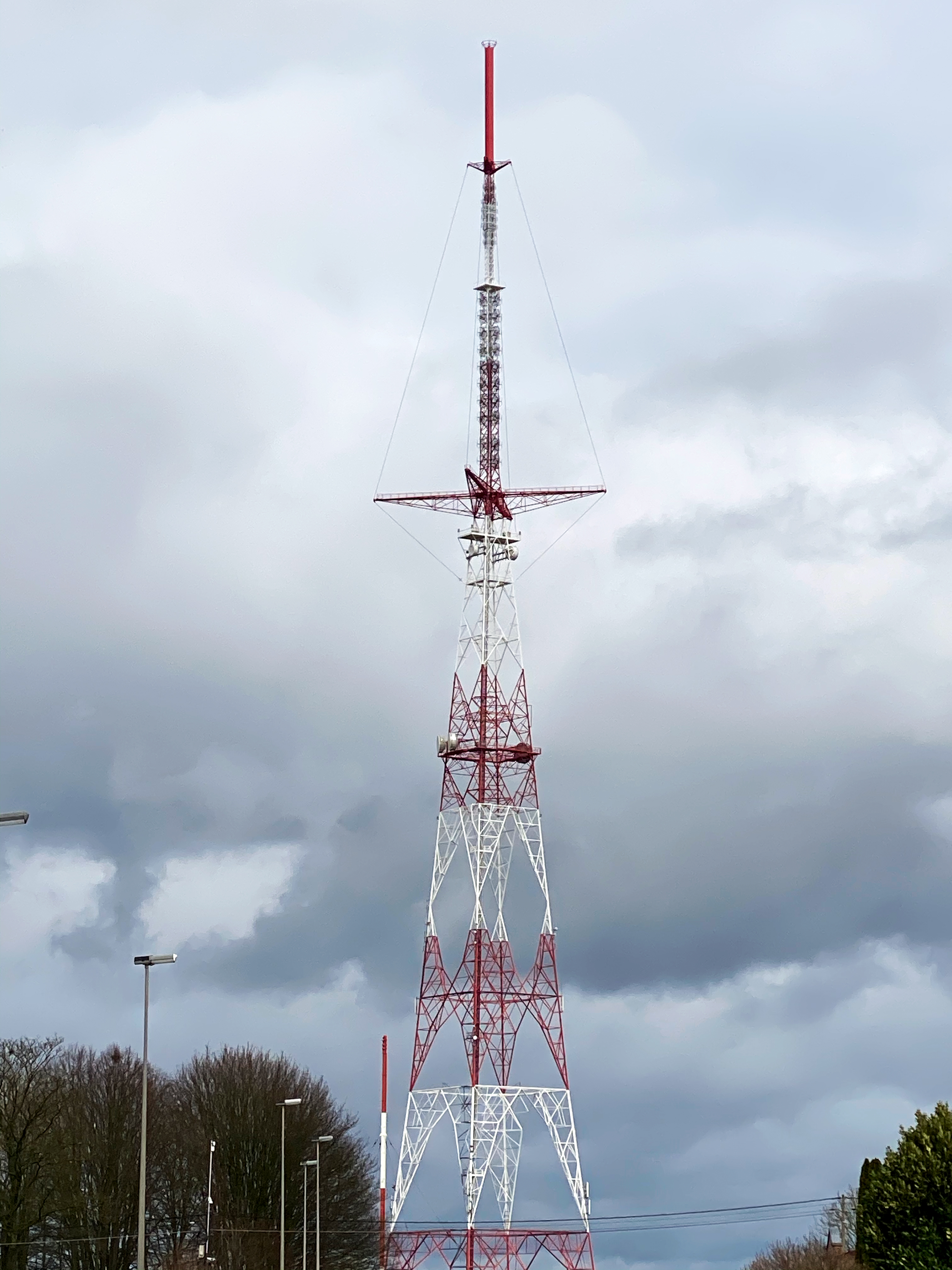
The main mast: FM, DAB+ & DVB-T

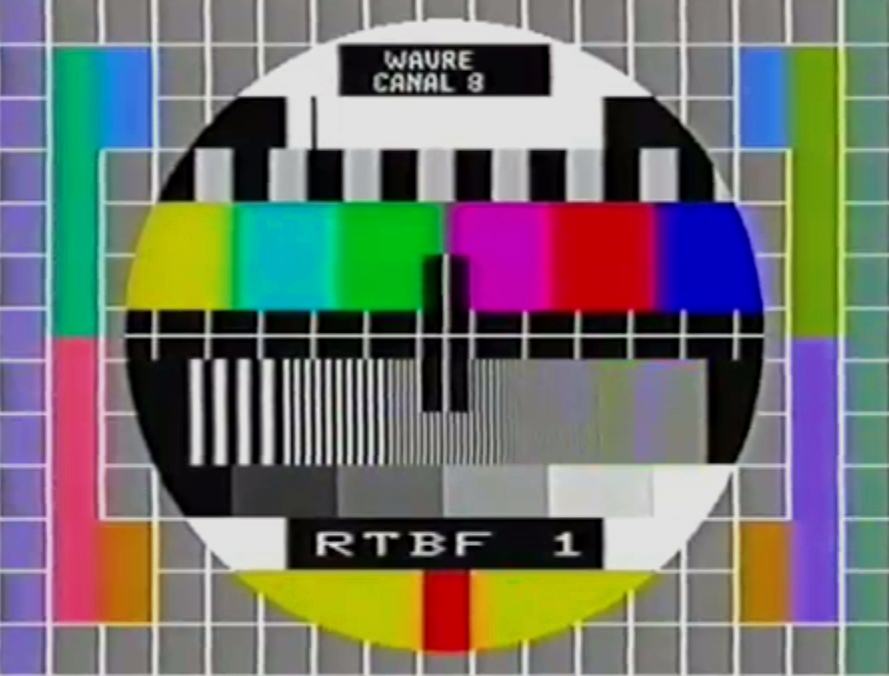
PM5544: common PAL Test pattern Wavre VHF Canal 8 / RTBF 1

The Wavre radio transmitter is a facility for Fm, Dab+ and TV broadcasting near Wavre in Belgium. Formerly the mediumwave transmissions used a grounded 250-metre-high guyed mast. Furthermore, there was a backup mast for medium wave transmissions, which was 90 metres high. For shortwave broadcasting there were several directional antennas and a curtain antenna.

For the FM/TV/DAB transmission a free-standing lattice tower with a height of 232 metres is used. This tower whose top is guyed at four horizontal crossbars similar to Grodno TV Tower replaces the mast used for FM/TV transmissions which fell during a storm on 13 October 1983.

== See also ==
- List of masts
- List of towers
- List of famous transmission sites
