= Bel RTL =

Commercial radio network in Belgium

- Schaerbeek; Belgium
- Broadcast area: Brussels and Wallonia

Programming
- Language: French

Ownership
- Owner: DPG Media (50%); Groupe Rossel (50%)
- Sister stations: Radio Contact

History
- First air date: 1991

Links
- Website: belrtl.be

Bel RTL is a commercial radio network broadcasting in Brussels and Wallonia (French-speaking Belgium). The station is owned by the Radio H holding company, which is part of the Belgium-based RTL Belgium. It is now owned by DPG Media and Groupe Rossel since 31 March 2022.

Bel RTL is currently (as of 2021) the most widely listened-to commercial radio station in the French Community of Belgium. It is the station's aim to be as big in Belgium as its sister station RTL is in France. Many of Bel RTL's presenters came to the station from the RTL-TVI television channel.

== Coverage ==
Bel RTL broadcasts throughout Wallonia and Brussels on the following FM frequencies:

- Brussels
  - Brussels: 104.0 MHz
- Hainaut
  - Arlon: 97.2 MHz
  - Ath: 103.6 MHz
  - Braine-le-Comte: 106.7 MHz
  - Charleroi: 104.0 MHz
  - Comines-Warneton: 90.8 MHz
  - Enghien: 107.0 MHz
  - La Louvière: 95.3 MHz
  - Mons: 103.4 MHz
  - Soignies: 106.1 MHz
  - Tournai: 93.6 MHz
- Liège
  - Huy - Waremme: 88.0 MHz
  - Liège: 103.6 MHz
  - Malmedy: 89.8 MHz
  - Verviers: 106.8 MHz
- Luxembourg
  - Bastogne: 106.1 MHz
  - Libramont-Chevigny: 106.2 MHz
  - Marche-en-Famenne: 101.6 MHz
  - Messancy: 106.1 MHz
  - Neufchâteau: 105.2 MHz
  - Virton: 104.8 MHz
- Namur
  - Beauraing: 101.4 MHz
  - Couvin: 101.7 MHz
  - Condroz (Ciney): 107.6 MHz
  - Condroz (Dinant): 101.9 MHz
  - Namur: 101.6 MHz
  - Philippeville: 106.1 MHz
- Walloon Brabant
  - Louvain-la-Neuve: 100.2 MHz
  - Nivelles: 88.9 MHz

== Logos ==
logo from Bel RTL until from July 2009 to September 2018.

== Programmes ==
- All Acces (Julien Sturbois)
- Beau fixe (Sandrine Dans)
- BelRTL matin (Barbara Mertens, Thomas Van Hamme)
- BelRTL midi (Frédéric Bastien)
- BelRTL non-stop
- BelRTL soir (Sylvie Degrelle, Pascal Vrebos)
- La vie est BEL (BelRTL va vous aider) (Ingrid Franssen, Christian De Paepe)
- C'est pas trop tôt (Alexandra De Paepe, Fabrice Collignon)
- La bel équipe (Thomas Van Hamme)
- La collection (Georges Lang)
- L'essentiel (Jean-Phillipe Lombardi)
- Le tirlipote (Alain Simons)
- Les grosses têtes (Philippe Bouvard & Emilie Dekegel)
- Les grosses têtes dans la nuit des temps (Philippe Bouvard)
- Les nocturnes (Fridays: WRTL Country) (Georges Lang)
- Ma semaine avec (Jean-Michel Zecca)
- On connaît la chanson (Bérénice)
- On refait le monde (Georges Huercano)
- Sans langue de bois (Mathieu Col)
- Va y avoir du sport (Luc Maton)
- Vivrensemble (Caroline Fontenoy)
