= Radio Contact (Belgium) =

- Schaerbeek (Brussels); Belgium
- Broadcast area: Belgium
- Frequencies: FM: 102.2 MHz (Brussels, Liège, Charleroi); 102.0 MHz (Mons); 104.7 MHz (Namur)

Programming
- Language: French
- Format: Pop, Top 40

Ownership
- Owner: DPG Media (50%); Groupe Rossel (50%)
- Sister stations: Bel RTL; Mint; Radio Contact (Eupen)

History
- First air date: 9 February 1980 years

Links
- Webcast: Listen live
- Website: radiocontact.be

Radio Contact is a Belgian commercial music radio station created in 9 February 1980 years, broadcasting in French in the French Community of Belgium.

The station is part of the Belgian Radio H holding, which belongs to RTL Belgium. RTL Belgium was acquired by DPG Media and Groupe Rossel on 31 March 2022, ended its 32 years ownership by RTL Group.

== History ==
Radio Contact is created in 9 February 1980 years by Francis Lemaire, Pierre Houtmans, Freddy Neyts (husband of Annemie Neyts-Uyttebroeck) and Catherine Servaes, after replacing the local radio station of Brussels Radio Kosmos.

The first broadcasts of Radio Contact were in Dutch and French, in 1981 the French-speaking Contact stayed on the frequency 101.3 MHz, and the Dutch-speaking Contact got the 104.0 MHz frequency in the Brussels area.

In November 1995, the German-speaking version, Radio Contact (Eupen) was created for the German Community of Belgium.

Since 2006, Radio Contact is part of Radio H, a holding held by RTL Group, Lemaire Electronics and the Groupe Rossel. RTL bought all the shares of Radio H in December 2020.

Today, Radio Contact is one of the most popular radio stations in the French and German-speaking Community of Belgium.

On 31 March 2009, Radio Contact launched Radio Contact Vision in digital television.

=== Flanders ===
In 1986, the Flemish version was created Radio Contact Vlaanderen. After the arrival of Q-Music and competing with Radio Donna the Flemish radio station lost many listeners.

On 12 December 2008, Radio Contact Vlaanderen announces to stop broadcasting and was eventually replaced in 2009 by ClubFM.

== See also ==
- Bel RTL
- Club RTL
- RTL Group
- RTL-TVI
- List of radio stations in Belgium
