= Belgischer Rundfunk =

Belgian public-service broadcasting organization

- Type: Radio and television
- Country: Belgium
- Availability: Regional
- Owner: German Community of Belgium
- Launch date: 1977; 49 years ago
- Official website: http://www.brf.be

Belgischer Rundfunk (BRF) (Belgian Broadcasting) is the public-service broadcasting organisation serving the German-speaking Community of Belgium. Its headquarters are based in Eupen. With additional studio facilities in Sankt Vith and Brussels, BRF produces one television and three radio channels.

== History ==
Previous "ear" logo used until 2015

German-language broadcasts were first started in Brussels by the National Institute of Radio Broadcasting (Nationaal Instituut voor Radio Omroep, NIR; Institut National de Radiodiffusion, INR) on 1 October 1945. In 1960, the NIR/INR became Belgische Radio en Televisie / Radio-Télévision Belge (BRT/RTB) and in 1961 RTB began a German-language radio channel, broadcasting from Liège.

In 1977, the German-language service was separated from RTB – which became Radio-Télévision Belge de la Communauté française (RTBF) – and BRT, which in 1990s became Vlaamse radio en televisie (VRT) – and the new company, Belgischer Rundfunk, began broadcasting from Eupen. For some years afterward, it continued to use BRT/RTB's old stylised "ear" logo long after its French and Flemish sisters dropped it. Unlike VRT and RTBF, BRF is not a member of the European Broadcasting Union.

In October 1999 BRF-TV was created; it broadcasts by cable in the East Cantons. On 15 November 2001, BRF and Deutschlandfunk Cologne began BRF-DLF, a radio station in Brussels for German-speakers in that area.

The iconic "ear" logo designed by Michel Olyff (seen to the right) was withdrawn on 22 June 2015, long after the Flemish and Walloon counterparts removed it. The current logo is limited to the extant wordmark.

== Services ==
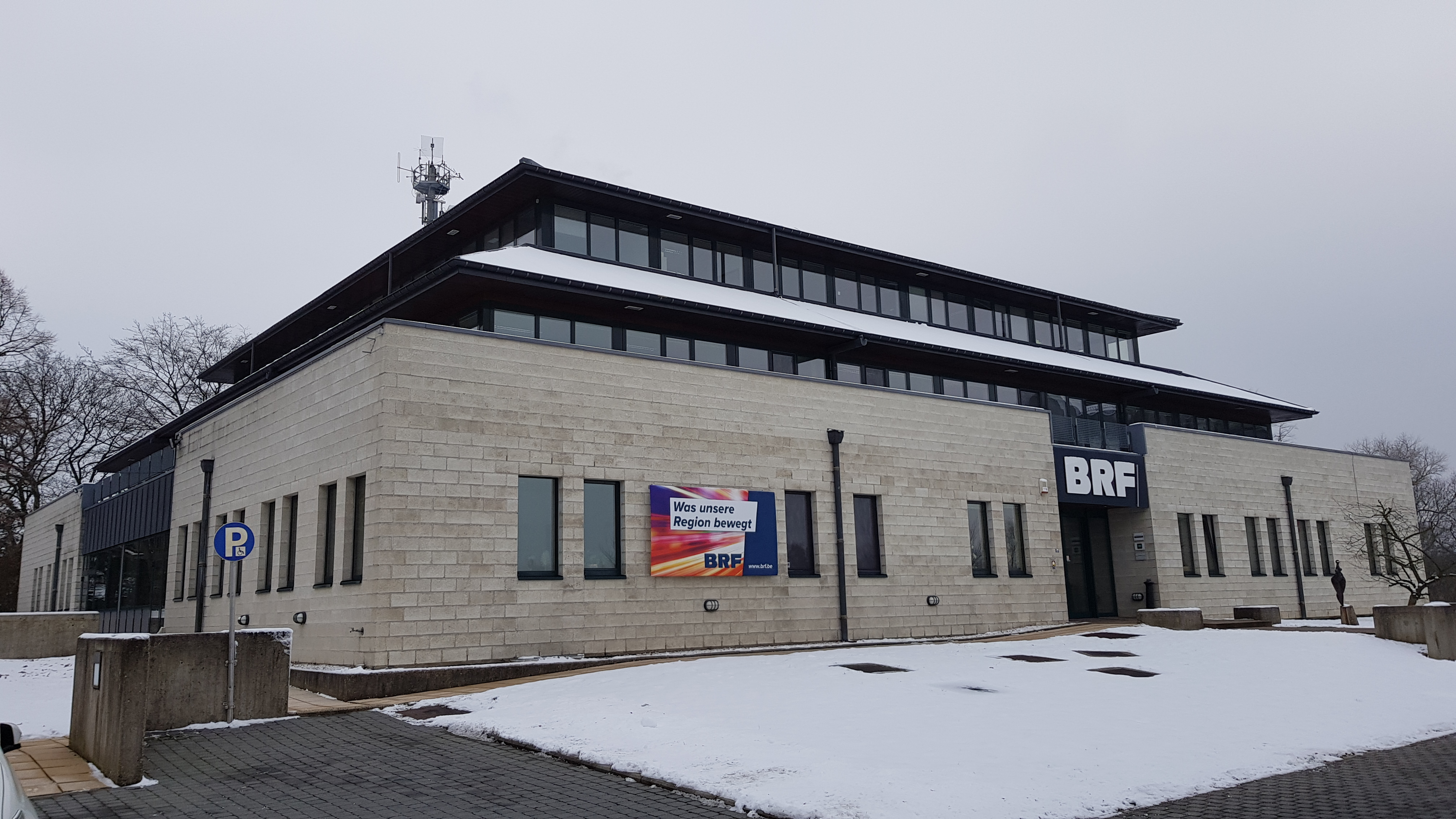
BRF House Eupen

=== Radio ===
- BRF1 is the speech and entertainment network with pop and rock music (plus specialist programmes covering classical and modern chanson).
- BRF2 is the popular music network (Schlager and volkstümliche Musik).

The group participates in two more projects:

- BRF-DLF combines the speech output of BRF1 with that of Deutschlandfunk.
- 100.5 Das Hitradio music station for German speaking part of Belgium, launched in 1998.

=== Television ===
- BRF TV broadcasts locally produced news and documentary programmes and can only be received fully via cable, Proximus TV and VOO digital TV. Their news program is also broadcast twice a day on the Euronews channel of the free-to-air DVB-T service of the RTBF.
