= La Première (Belgium) =

- Belgium
- Frequencies: Brussels and Brabant: Brussels-Centre: 92.5 MHz; Brussels and Brabant wallon: 96.1 MHz; Liège: Huy: 94.3 MHz; Liège: 96.4 MHz; Malmédy: 89.2 MHz; Saint-Vith: 87.9 MHz; Spa: 97.3 MHz; Verviers: 91.3 MHz; Waremme: 94.6 MHz; Hainaut: Ath: 97.9 MHz; Charleroi: 94.8 MHz; Chimay: 87.6 MHz; Comines: 94.1 MHz; Tournai (Hainaut occidental): 106.0 MHz; La Louvière: 91.5 MHz; Mons: 91.5 MHz; Thuin: 93.4 MHz; Namur - Luxembourg: Bouillon: 89.4 MHz; Couvin: 94.2 MHz; Houffalize: 90.2 MHz; La Roche-en-Ardenne: 96.0 MHz; Marche-en-Famenne: 93.3 MHz; Namur: 102.7 MHz; Sud-Luxembourg and Ardennes: 96.4 MHz; Vielsalm: 102.8 MHz; Andorra: 34 UHF

Programming
- Format: Generalist

Ownership
- Owner: RTBF

History
- First air date: 24 November 1923; 102 years ago

Links
- Website: www.lapremiere.be

La Première (French pronunciation: [la pʁəmjɛʁ], "The First") is a national French-language radio channel produced by the Belgian public broadcasting organization Radio télévision belge de la communauté française (RTBF).

It is a "generalist" station carrying a wide range of principally spoken-word and information-based programming, and is RTBF's main radio news channel.

It is broadcast on FM, and digital (DAB and DVB-T), as well as being streamed on the internet. It has been announced that the Medium Wave service on 621 kHz from the Wavre transmitter has already ceased on 31 December 2018.

== History ==
The radio station was first launched on 24 November 1923 at 11am (CET) under the ownership of the Société Belge Radio-électrique (SBR) called Radio Belgique, until it was acquired by the state-run Belgian National Broadcasting Institute (INR/NIR) in 1930.

== Logos ==
La Première thrid logo from 2004 to 2017.

La Première fourth logo from 2017 to 2025.

== See also ==
- RTBF
