= Tipik (TV channel) =

Belgian French-language TV channel

- Country: Belgium

Programming
- Language: French

Ownership
- Owner: RTBF
- Sister channels: La Une, La Trois, TipikVision

History
- Launched: 26 March 1977; 49 years ago
- Former names: RTbis (1977–1979); Télé 2 (1979–1988); Télé 21 (1988–1993); Arte/21 & Sports 21 (1993–1994); RTBF 21 (1994–1997); RTBF La Deux (1997–2002); La Deux (2002–2020)

Links
- Website: Official site of Tipik

Availability

Terrestrial
- RTBF DVB-T (FTA): Channel 2

Tipik is a Belgian national television channel, owned and operated by the French-language public-service broadcasting organization RTBF.

== History ==
=== From RTbis to Télé 2 ===
On March 26, 1977, RTB launched a second television channel called RTBis, which only broadcast on Monday and Wednesday from 8 pm to 10 pm, airing programs aimed at a restricted audience, such as Walloon-language plays and cultural or educational programmes, but also reruns of successful series. Although it was officially created to broadcast regional programs produced by RTB's two regional TV centers (Charleroi and Liège), adult education programs and public service blocks, the second channel aimed to occupy the old network of black and white transmitters of the first channel, which had converted to color so that no commercial station could claim it. RTBis relayed RTB1 programs most of the time, which made it attractive by broadcasting popular soap operas, movies, variety shows and game shows, although it mostly tried to be complementary, without being specialized, by releasing space and time for full relays of events such as figure skating, tennis tournaments, and the Queen Elisabeth Competition. In October 1977, when RTB became RTBF, the channel started broadcasting four nights a week, from Mondays to Thursdays.

RTBF renamed it Télé 2 at the end of October 1979 and adopted an event-based schedule mainly focused on sports. The channel broadcast Mondays to Fridays, and was off the air on weekends.

On October 16, 1983, a wind of 130 km/h damaged one of the 315-meter-high (1,033 ft) RTBF pylons in Wavre, which deprived the access of the channel to 100,000 viewers for one year.

The RTBF activity report submitted in 1984 to the Parliament of the French Community presented several options concerning the future of Télé 2. It was a question of making it either a pay television channel or of reinforcing it in its own right in the regional dimension, either to make it a sports, event and (rerun) entertainment channel, or even make it a "sport/events" channel where it was simultaneously attempted to value RTBF1's own production at peak viewing times.

Télé 2 disappeared on March 20, 1988, to make room for the new channel Télé 21.

=== Télé 21, reformats and RTBF La Deux ===
On March 21, 1988, RTBF launched Télé 21 on its second network, a new second full-fledged channel that took its name from the youth radio station Radio 21, whose spirit and dynamism it wanted to capture on television. It no longer relayed the first channel, except for their news programme simulcast with sign language.

In the autumn of 1989, Télé 21, whose ratings fluctuated from high to low (from 16 to 18% to less than 0.85), was repositioned as the channel of events and repeats of very expensive programmes that a good part of the public could not follow on RTBF1. It also rebroadcast the main evening news of the first channel at 10pm. All of its staff was transferred to RTBF1, and RTBF hoped to save 100 million francs.

At the beginning of 1992, the RTBF general director, Robert Stéphane, submitted to the board of directors the idea of remodeling Télé 21, whose audience was moribund, by associating it with Eurosport or Canal J. He then contemplated the break-up of Télé 21 into three channels: a cultural one, a regional one and a sports one. Arte 21 would broadcast the cultural programs of the Franco-German channel Arte, but with Belgian cultural opt-outs. Also, during the Queen Elisabeth competition, the evenings would be RTBF opt-outs. Euro 21 would be a European regional channel that would concretise FR3's approachment with RTBF, but the FR3 news slots would be replaced by the rebroadcasting of the regional news bulletin and by RTBF's Journal Télévisé. Finally, Eurosport, following convention involving RTBF, the European Broadcasting Union and TF1, would broadcast Eurosport's French programmes and make opt-outs to broadcast Belgian sports.

Two of these three projects were taking shape. RTBF signed a partnership agreement with Arte GEIE on 4 February 1993, which enabled it to broadcast the French version of the programmes of the Franco-German cultural channel every day at 7pm on Télé 21 and to offer 50 hours of Belgian programmes in the service. Arte/21 started its programmes on March 21, 1993, completed by the start-up at 3:30pm until the start of Arte at 7pm with RTBF cultural programmes and the children's programme Nouba Nouba. The Télé 21 sports programmes that no longer had their place in this programme were grouped together on a new sports mini-channel called Sports 21, which continued broadcasting major sporting events live, but remained primarily the relay of the first channel including news from RTBF1 with sign language translation every evening at 7:30pm, sports reports already being previously scheduled and the repeat of Weekend in Sports on Sunday evening. The network of transmitters of Télé 21 is split to broadcast the two channels, Arte/21 incorporating most of the transmitters of Télé 21 and its channel on cable television networks. Sports 21 programs are transmitted by other transmitters and another channel on cable.

The partnership agreement between RTBF and Arte was suspended on March 28, 1994, ending the broadcast of Arte/21 and Sports 21. Télé 21 was then broadcast under the simple name of 21 in its original format, along with children's programmes like Ici Bla-Bla, also broadcast on RTBF1. At the same time, the late edition of Journal Télévisé began airing live on that channel instead of its sister channel, RTBF1.

On 1 March 1997, Télé 21 divided its programme offerings between La Deux, a multicast channel for cultural programmes, documentaries and the reception channel for non-sporting live events (Parliamentary Committees, Queen Elisabeth Music Competition, for example) and Eurosport 21, which offered windows of sports programs produced by RTBF, inserted into the complete programme of Eurosport France.

On 1 March 1997, RTBF 21 split for the second time, but this time, it was known as Eurosport 21, which became more of an events channel and simulcast with Eurosport on some days. Because of this, several programmes moved to a new channel called RTBF La 2, which took over that frequency. RTBF La 2's programming consisted of documentaries, cultural, live sports or non-sports coverage. During the FIFA World Cup 1998, RTBF decided to air all matches on its two main channels, La 1 and La 2. So that the wider public had access to full coverage, a redistribution of transmitters that transmitted La Une and La Deux was implemented on cable networks, and also by analogue terrestrial networks, in the whole territory of the French Community of Belgium. The terrestrial coverage deprived 5% of its viewing audience, as well as the entirety of the cable networks of Flanders, from having access to the broadcast of sporting events carried by RTBF's two channels. This scheme continued after the World Cup by the Board of Directors on July 13, 1998. RTBF Eurosport 21 ceased transmission on 1 March 1999, when a contract between RTBF and Eurosport was broken and caused all sports content to be broadcast on both free-to-air channels, La 1 and La 2.

=== La Deux (2001–2020) ===
On 1 November 2001, Carine Bratzlavsky was designated to draft a reformatting of the channel. Bratzlavsky had been production coordinator of Arte-Belgium, the interface created between the RTBF and the team of the European cultural channel, since 1995. Previously Bratzlavsky was in charge of the second channel of the RTBF, at the time called Télé 21.

In December 2001, while working on the RTBF news program schedules for the start of January 2002, the date of 21 March is advanced to re-launch the new version of La Deux. However, following the resignation of the director-general of RTBF, Christian Druitte, doubts were raised about the timing and a delay was considered. In March, the information was confirmed: the new La Deux would be launched in September, and September 2 was finally fixed as the launch date. The aim was to break the image unmethodical or catchall, La Deux, giving it a strong identity, and making a channel of its own. The channel was renamed La Deux instead of La 2, and adopted a new round logo. The exterior of the ident is fully reviewed, and plays on the colours to distinguish between time slots for children (yellow tones), adolescents (greens) and adults (mauve and purple tones). The whole thing is accompanied by a sound design and ident produced by Marc Moulin.

Besides maintaining old programs, such as Ici Bla-Bla (for children), many new programs are produced. The show G'nôme, aimed at 9–14 years, followed by Tu passes quand tu veux (produced by Barbara Louys and hosted by two newcomers: Maureen Louys and David Antoine), whose target audience are teenagers. Also note: the debut of Screen (movie block), Clips en ligne, or to Extratime (dedicated to urban or indoor sports, martial arts, etc.). The show also aired the French TV channel Téva's programme Sex in the TV.

On 26 January 2004, together with RTBF's main channel La Une, La Deux changes its look and logo again and reorganizes its programming in complementarity with La Une. In December 2005, the channel switches to 16:9 format completely.

In 2007, RTBF launched a third channel, La Trois and an international channel, RTBF Sat.

On 15 February 2010, RTBF Sat ceased transmission. The children's programming block Ici Bla Bla stopped in June 2010, to be replaced by Ouftivi, the new RTBF children brand, broadcast all day on La Trois since 26 September 2010.

In March 2011, RTBF analogue transmitters ceased transmissions.

=== Tipik, a unified young adult media ===
From 7 September 2020, La Deux merged with RTBF's youth radio station Pure to form a new brand for young people called Tipik. Tipik is available on TV as a channel replacing La Deux, on radio replacing Pure, and online.

PureVision, the TV channel version of the radio Pure, rebranded as TipikVision at the same time.

== Programming ==
Tipik's programming consisted of talkshows, local dramas, dramas from the US and the UK, news, sports, movies, current affairs and also youth programmes, complementing RTBF's main channel, La Une. Tipik was also considered to be the equivalent to its Flemish (Dutch-language) counterpart, VRT Canvas, which also follows the same programming structure.

Some programmes from the French public channels, France 2 and France 3, were also broadcast on this channel.

Following the arrival of Yves Bigot, former director of entertainment for France 2, as the program director of RTBF, the programming of the channel underwent a revamp, with the following characteristics:

- Transferring American cult series from La Une to La Deux.
- Broadcasting American soap operas in the afternoon.
- Thursday evening was the best evening for humor with the broadcasting of French comedy performances.
- Tuesday, Wednesday and Friday nights were reserved for movies, with a bonus and decryption games hosted by Cathy Immelen, the "Miss Cinema" of RTBF, following each film.
- Mondays & Sunday nights were reserved for documentaries.
- The youth programme Bla-Bla evolved with the use of a virtual set.

The channel, which previously lacked an identity and variable programming, ran on specific themes:

- Documentary
- Series and cult serials
- Cinema for moviegoers
- Comedy
- Culture, music and society
- Sports

Since 7 September 2020, Tipik targets young adults.

=== News ===
Prior to the launch of La Trois on 30 November 2007, La Deux previously simulcast its main channel La Une's 19:30 news bulletins in sign language. La Deux later ceased simulcasting its main channel La Une's bulletins.

From 1994 to 2000, La Deux aired JT Soir, alternating with its sister channel, La Une on some days. La Une also broadcast this edition as a rerun, prior to closedown.

In 2000, JT Soir began broadcasting daily on RTBF La Deux and continued to do so until the end of the channel. From 2006, La Deux aired Le 12 Minutes. Every night, it was presented by Eric Boever.

On 21 March 2011, as part of RTBF's major revamp in their news broadcasts and new intros, La Deux later premiered another bulletin for this channel, Le 15 Minutes, which was presented by Ophélie Fontana and Jonathan Bradfer and broadcast at 19:00.

== Logos and identities ==
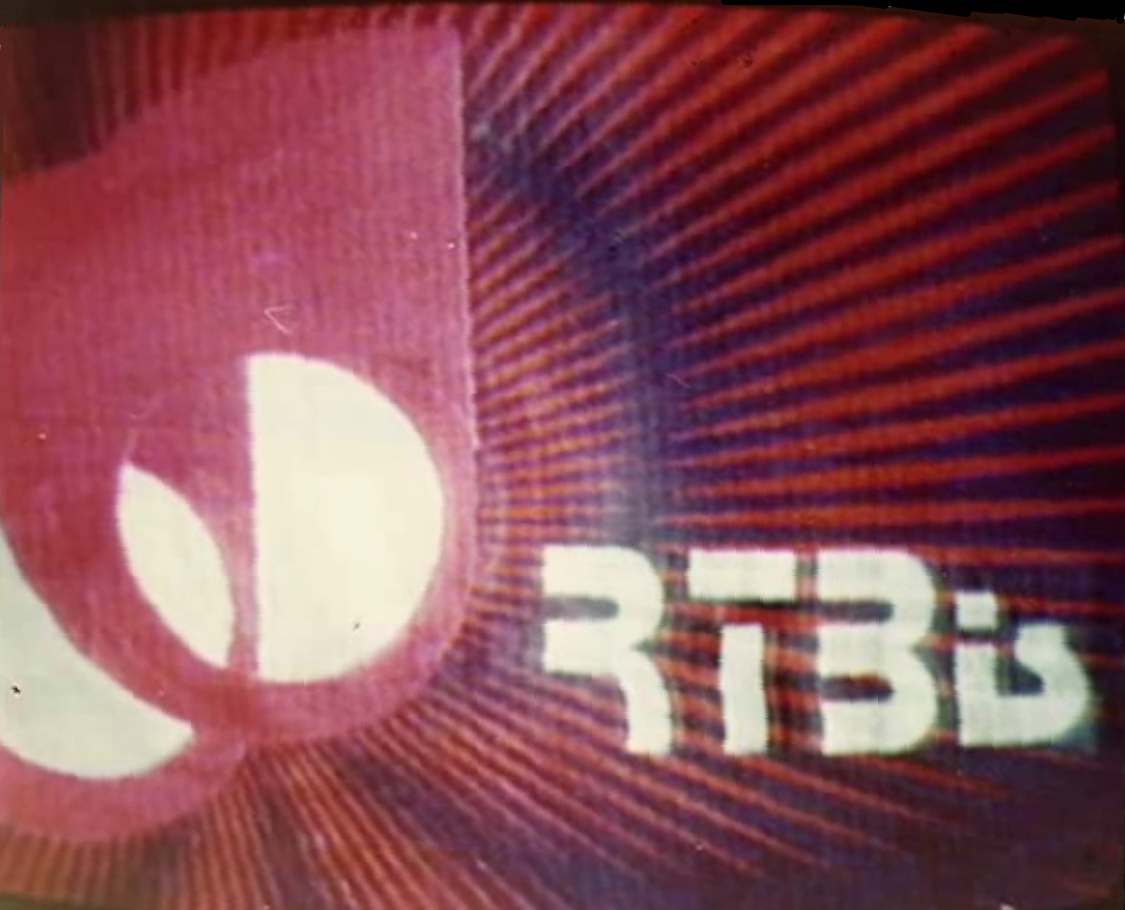
Logo of RTBis from 1977 to 1979, featuring two overlapping ears.

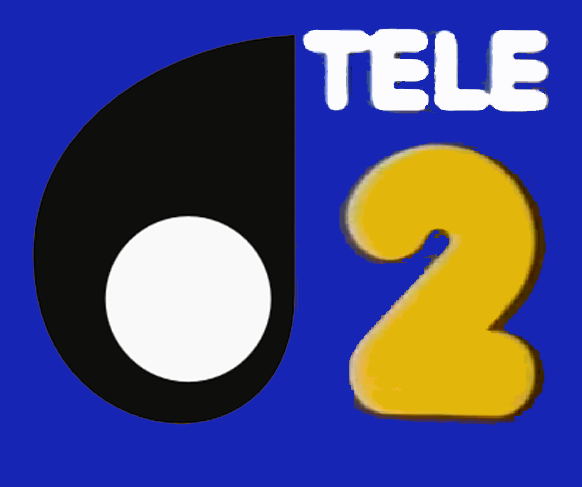
Logo of Télé 2 from 1979 to October 1982

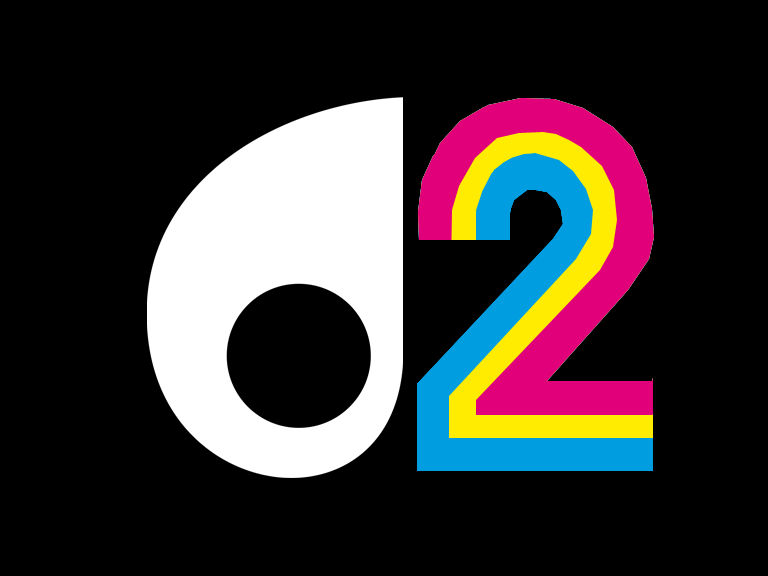
Logo of Télé 2 from October 1982 to 26 September 1985

Logo of Télé 21 from 21 March 1988 to 20 March 1993 and from 28 March 1994 to 1995

Logo of Sports 21 from 21 March 1993 to 27 March 1994

Logo of RTBF 21 from 1995 to 1996

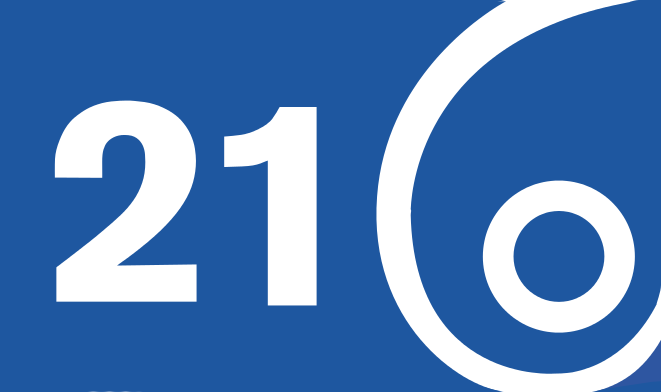
RTBF 21 logo from 1996 to 1997

RTBF La Deux logo from March 1997 to September 2003

RTBF La Deux logo from 2 September 2003 to 25 January 2004

La Deux logo from 26 January 2004 to 16 December 2011 and reintroduced on 1 September 2014 to 6 September 2020

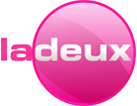
16 December 2011 to 1 September 2014

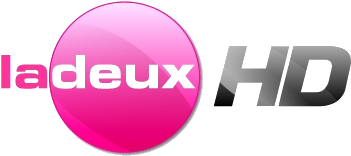
La Deux HD logo from 16 December 2011 to 1 September 2014

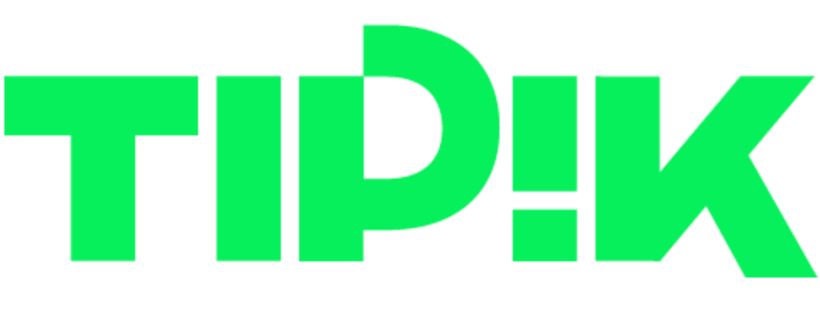
Tipik logo from 7 September 2020 to 8 December 2025

== See also ==
- RTBF
- La Une
- La Trois
- Arte
- Eurosport
- List of television channels in Belgium
