= La Une =

Belgian French-language television channel

- Country: Belgium

Ownership
- Owner: RTBF
- Sister channels: Tipik, La Trois

History
- Launched: 31 October 1953; 72 years ago
- Former names: INR (1953–1960); RTB (1960–1977); RTBF1 (1977–1997); RTBF La Une (1997–2004)

Links
- Website: Official site of La Une

Availability

Terrestrial
- RTBF DVB-T (FTA): Channel 1

La Une (French pronunciation: [la yn]) is a Belgian national television channel, owned and operated by the French-language public-service broadcasting organization RTBF. La Une is the French-language equivalent of the Flemish station VRT 1, operated by public broadcaster VRT.

Established in 1953 as part of the National Institute of Belgian Radio (INR), the channel was Belgium's first official television service. It evolved through several structural reorganizations, becoming Radio-Télévision Belge (RTB) in 1960 and RTBF 1 in 1977, before adopting its current name in 2004. As the flagship channel of RTBF, La Une offers generalist programming, including news, documentaries, and entertainment, and is widely available across Belgium and neighboring countries via terrestrial, cable, and satellite network.

== History ==
=== INR ===
Experimental television began in Belgium on 2 June 1953 with the live broadcast of the coronation of Queen Elizabeth II of the United Kingdom.

On 31 October at 20:30 from Studio 5 of Le Flagey, the headquarters of the National Institute of Belgian Radio (INR), Andrée Rolin officially opened the channel. After that, the announcer Janine Lambotte opened the broadcast with the newly created experimental television and broadcast 2 hours a day, 6 days a week. Transmission began with the French television news relayed by the RTF transmitter TV-Lille (France's first regional station), followed by a cabaret-themed broadcast called Boum.

In the early days, INR broadcast two to three evenings per week, with a strong focus on theatre and drama, and was aired on Fridays and during the holidays. On Wednesday and Sunday evenings, the channel broadcast its own productions. The rest of the programming was provided by RTF. The first live sports coverage began with the FIFA World Cup 1954 and Monday Sports from 1955. The first newscast premiered on 1 September 1956, produced entirely in Brussels and with very few pictures, except for the presenter reading the script.

The weather report already existed. For several years, it was in the form of animated cartoons corresponding to the weather announced. These drawings were carried out at the Royal Meteorological Institute live from a frosted glass leaving only the drawing of a character with an umbrella or a radiant sun on bathers, etc. visible. These were done by Bob Boudard, a cabaret variety artist gifted with a talent of drawing cartoons (and also capable of whistling and interpreting various musical pieces). Hidden behind the frosted screen, Boudard had to carry out the bulletin on the fly when he arrived at the institute, often at the last minute thanks to taxi drivers who had got to know him and who were ready to go and bring him in time because he had various obligations that kept him busy in Brussels, among others maintaining his cafe on the Rue des Dominicains, a meeting point for many actors from the theaters of Brussels' city centre.

The Brussels World's Fair in 1958 gave the INR an opportunity to strengthen its new television networks and supersede radio. The panel "Belgian experimental television" disappeared from the screen, outside broadcast vans were acquired, Expo Magazine was broadcast daily for six months, and closing days and the interruption during the holidays disappeared. Every day, reports, interviews, debates and animations made the summary of activities of the Expo '58. The Investigations and Reports section introduced the first major magazine on Belgian television: Neuf Millions (Nine Million).

In 1953, there were only 6,500 television sets in Belgium. The INR transmitters were then located at the Palais de Justice in Brussels and limited to a reach in a radius of 40 km. It was not until 1954 that transmitters were built in Liège and 1958 in Wavre, which could cover almost 96% of the French-speaking territory. In 1956, there were over 100,000 television sets, and in 1960, it reached the 70,000 viewer mark throughout Belgium.

=== RTB ===
In 1960, the Harmel Act replaced the National Institute of Broadcasting by Radio-Télévision Belge (RTB). The new facility included a Dutch public broadcaster (Belgische Radio en Televisie or BRT), a French public broadcaster (Radio-Télévision Belge or RTB) and an institution of common services. Both broadcasters were independent of each other and had full cultural autonomy, an organic vis-à-vis independence from the government and the guarantee of freedom of information. RTB/BRT was headed by a program director appointed by the King.

In 1962, cable was introduced in Liège and Namur and was later rolled out throughout the country in 1975, ending the monopoly of public television. Numerous programmes premiered such as Le Jardin Extraordinaire (1965), Le Week-end sportif (1967), the live broadcast of the Tour de France, the first political debates and election nights and major reports abroad. In 1971, the RTB began its color transmissions with Le Jardin extraordinaire and the news in 1973.

In 1977, a second television channel was created, RTbis, and the decentralization of production took place with the creation of regional centres in Liège and Charleroi. A new production centre was established in Brussels in 1979.

=== RTBF 1 ===
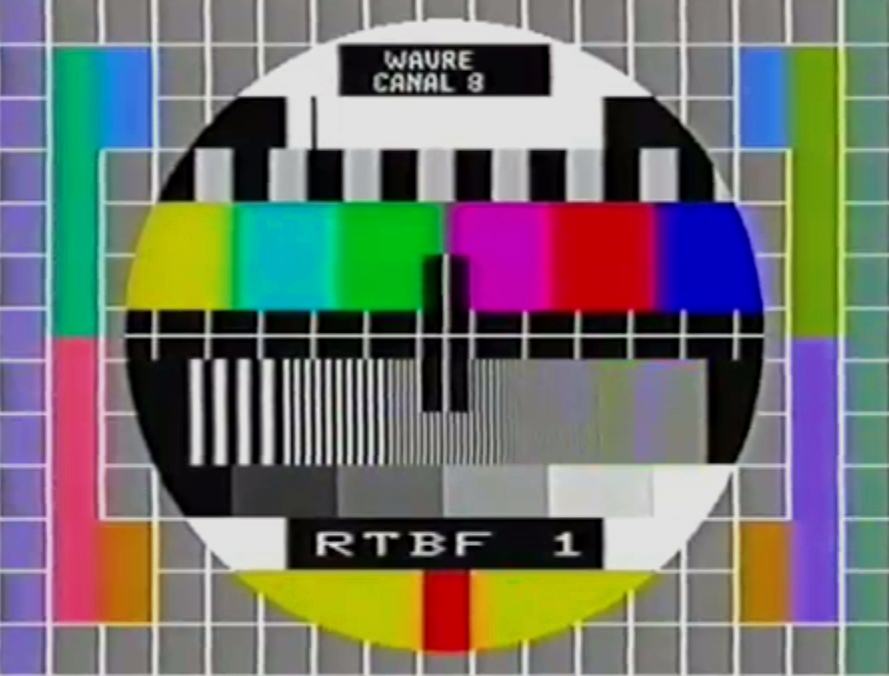
Philips PM5544 test card of RTBF 1 transmitted on channel K08 from the Wavre transmitter in 1987.

RTB became the Belgian Radio and Television of the French Community (RTBF) in 1977 by the decree of the Cultural Council of the French Community. RTBF offered cultural autonomy, a monopoly of radio and television broadcasting, freedom of information and of independence from the government. RTBF would be governed by a board of directors whose members would be elected in accordance with policy distributions within the Cultural Council. The Chief Executive would be appointed by the Cultural Council.

The first television channel of the RTBF was renamed RTBF 1.

In 1983, RTL Television was launched and obtained the authorization of a radio relay between Luxembourg and Brussels; in compensation, RTBF received access to non-commercial advertising in 1984. Financial contributions and the on-screen display of commercial sponsors would be permitted in exceptional cases in 1987 to allow the RTBF to organise the Eurovision Song Contest. The decree of the French Community authorizing the dissemination of commercial advertising by commercial channel RTL-TVI in 1988 put an end to the monopoly of broadcasting of the RTBF, but in 1989, another decree of the French Community authorized the broadcast by RTBF of commercial advertisements to rebalance the situation. Management and marketing of advertising space were entrusted to TVB, a joint venture of public and private channels of the French Community (RTBF 1, Télé 21 and RTL-TVI). TVB divided the advertising revenue between the two channels by 25% to 75% for RTBF and RTL. The system was later criticized from all sides and was discontinued in 1996.

=== RTBF La Une ===
In 1997, the Parliament of the French Community made RTBF an autonomous public company, with RTBF 1 being renamed RTBF La 1 along with RTBF 21 into RTBF La 2. RTBF La Une became the first Belgian television channel to broadcast 24 hours a day, unlike its Flemish counterpart, BRTN TV1 (now known as één) which closed down during the day. During the FIFA World Cup 1998, RTBF decided to air all matches on its two main channels, La 1 and La 2. So that the wider public had access to the full coverage, it later redistributed to transmitters that transmitted La Une and La Deux on cable networks and also by analogue terrestrial, throughout Wallonia. This scheme continued after the World Cup.

=== Visual identity (logo) ===
In September 1985, the yellow numeral 1 appeared, and as a result, a new CGI look was created. The start-up and closedown video represented an environment made of geometric figures, while the intro of Journal Télévisé showed a 3D view of the district where the Reyers Tower was located. The packaging was slightly modified in 1989 to mark the start of commercial advertising on RTBF.

5 years later, to the day, the entire look was redone, from its general identity to the promos. A blue ring was added to the back of the stylized yellow "1" and the new design was based on a shadow play on a blue background to give the channel a little more projection and a more modern style. JT's intro was similar to the previous one, without the buildings in 3D and with a more transparent Reyers Tower.

In September 1992, 4 rectangles were added to the extant logo. A new look, created by the OLM agency, was implemented, including the logo and photographs of the various hosts and presenters of the channel. JT's new opening was more simplistic: the components of the logo came alive and a globe was added in the blue circle.

A new intro for JT was used at the beginning of 1994. It depicted the Reyers Tower projecting rays of light at the top of the Earth.

Between 1994 and 1996, several on-air designs followed one another, including one with floating squares.

A new, more abstract logo appeared in September 1996, retiring the yellow numeral 1. The look showcased the new logo in different environments. It was later replaced from March 1997 by a graphically similar look, but featuring a first version of the chip look.

The new logos of the RTBF channels arrived in September 1997, featuring a chip design. The idents and the promos contained sped-up images of road trips. The new JT intro, however, was only used from December, featuring nocturnal aerial views of the Reyers Tower.

In January 2000, a new look was adopted, with some modifications in 2002 and 2003. This look would be the last to contain versions for start-ups and closedowns, while the previous one did not.

On 26 January 2004 the current logo appeared. The first look with this logo featured a pointer. The new JT intro featured the rotating Earth on a reddish-white background. This intro was changed in 2005.

On 21 March 2011 a new JT intro appeared for the first time. In December of that same year, a new 3D look also appeared.

On 21 March 2016 the JT intro changed again. The graphics were the same, but with a few changes and the reappearance of the red square for La Une newscasts, and a pink circle for La Deux newscasts.

On 3 September 2018 the news got a makeover. A whole new studio, a whole new intro, but also a second new set for, among others, On n'est pas des pigeons!, Jeudi en prime and Studio Foot.

La Une's first logo from 1953 to 1960

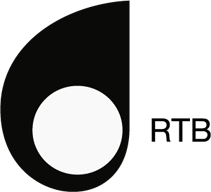
La Une's third logo, as RTB, from 1967 to 1977

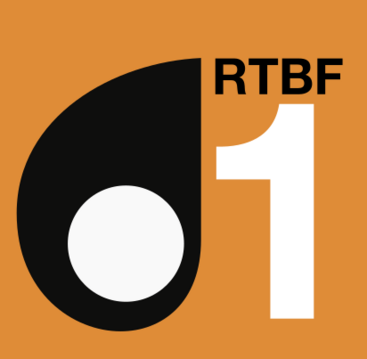
Third logo, as RTBF 1, from 1977 to 1982

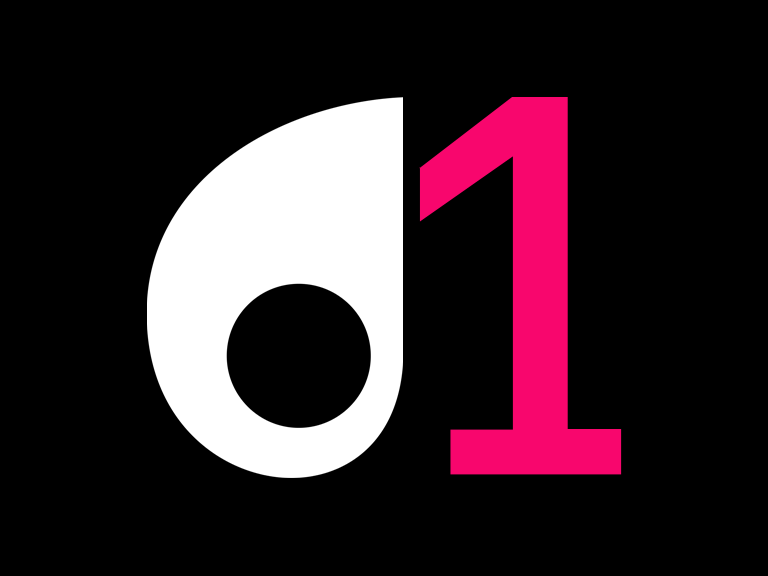
RTBF1 logo from 1982 to 1985

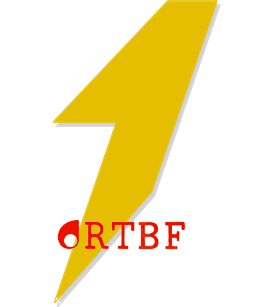
RTBF1 logo from 1985 to 12 September 1990

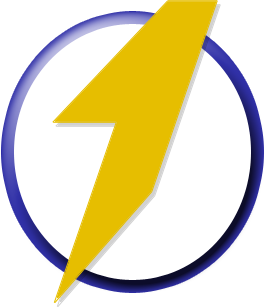
RTBF1 logo from 12 September 1990 to 25 August 1992

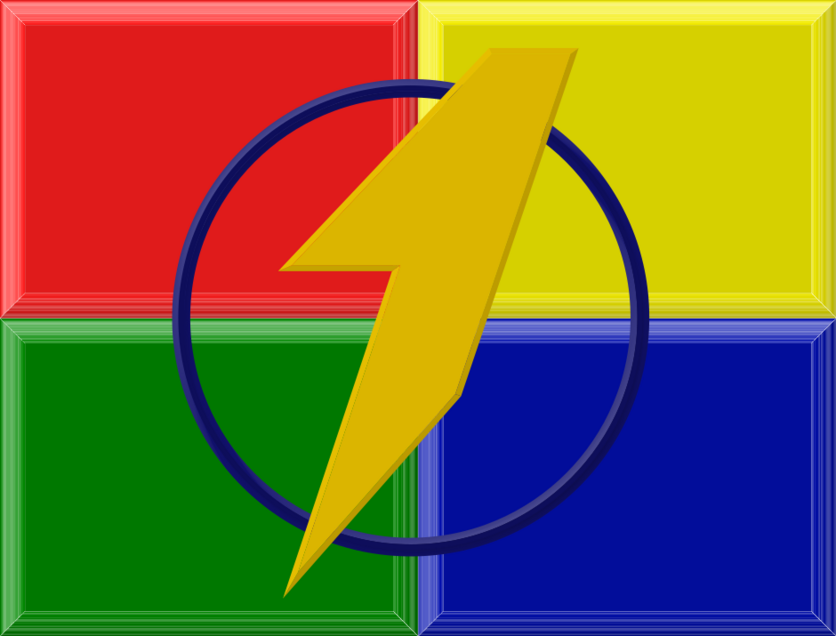
RTBF1 logo from August 1992 to 1996

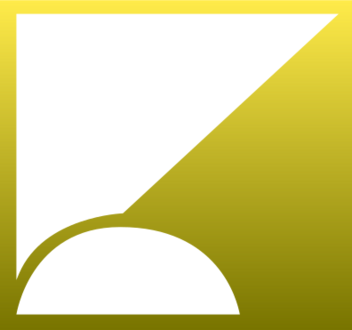
RTBF1 logo from 1996 to March 1997

RTBF1 logo from March 1997 to 25 January 2004

La Une logo from 26 January 2004 to 16 December 2011 and reintroduced on 1 September 2014 to 8 December 2025.

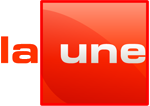
La Une logo from 16 December 2011 to 1 September 2014.

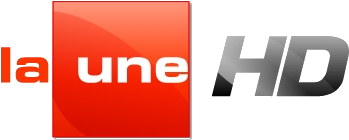
La Une HD version logo since 16 December 2011 at 20:00.

=== La Une ===
In January 2004, RTBF La 1 was renamed La Une. In March 2011, La Une ceased broadcasting on analogue along with La Deux and La Trois.

== Availability ==
La Une is available in Brussels and Wallonia via Digital Terrestrial (DVB-T), cable (VOO & Telenet), satellite via TéléSAT and Belgacom TV (IPTV).

In Flanders, prior to the digital switchover, La Une was also available in certain cities near the Walloon border in the following provinces: Flemish Brabant, East Flanders, Limburg, Antwerp and West Flanders via analogue terrestrial, due to the terrestrial spillover. La Une is also available in Flanders, TéléSAT and TV Vlaanderen via Satellite, Proximus Pickx, Telenet and Voo.

La Une is available in Luxembourg via spillover from neighbouring Wallonia as well as via pay-TV providers Luxembourg Online and Tango.
