= RTBF =

Belgium's French-language public broadcaster

Radio-télévision belge de la Communauté française
- Type: Broadcast radio, television and online
- Country: Belgium
- Headquarters: Reyers Tower, Schaerbeek, Brussels-Capital Region
- Owner: French Community of Belgium
- Launch date: 1930; 96 years ago (radio); 1953; 73 years ago (television)
- Former names: INR (1930–1960); RTB (1960–1977)
- Official website: Official website

The Radio-télévision belge de la Communauté française ("Belgian Radio-television of the French Community"), shortened to RTBF (branded as rtbf.be), is a public service broadcaster and news website for the French-speaking community of Belgium. Its counterpart in the Flemish Community is the Dutch-language VRT (Vlaamse Radio- en Televisieomroeporganisatie), and in the German-speaking minority it is BRF (Belgischer Rundfunk).

The RTBF operates five television channels (La Une, Tipik, La Trois, Arte Belgique and TipikVision) together with a number of radio channels, including La Première, RTBF Mix, VivaCité, Musiq'3, Classic 21, and Tipik.

The organisation's headquarters in Brussels, which is shared with VRT, is sometimes referred to colloquially as Reyers. This comes from the name of the avenue where the RTBF/VRT's main building is located, the Boulevard Auguste Reyers/Auguste Reyerslaan.

== History ==
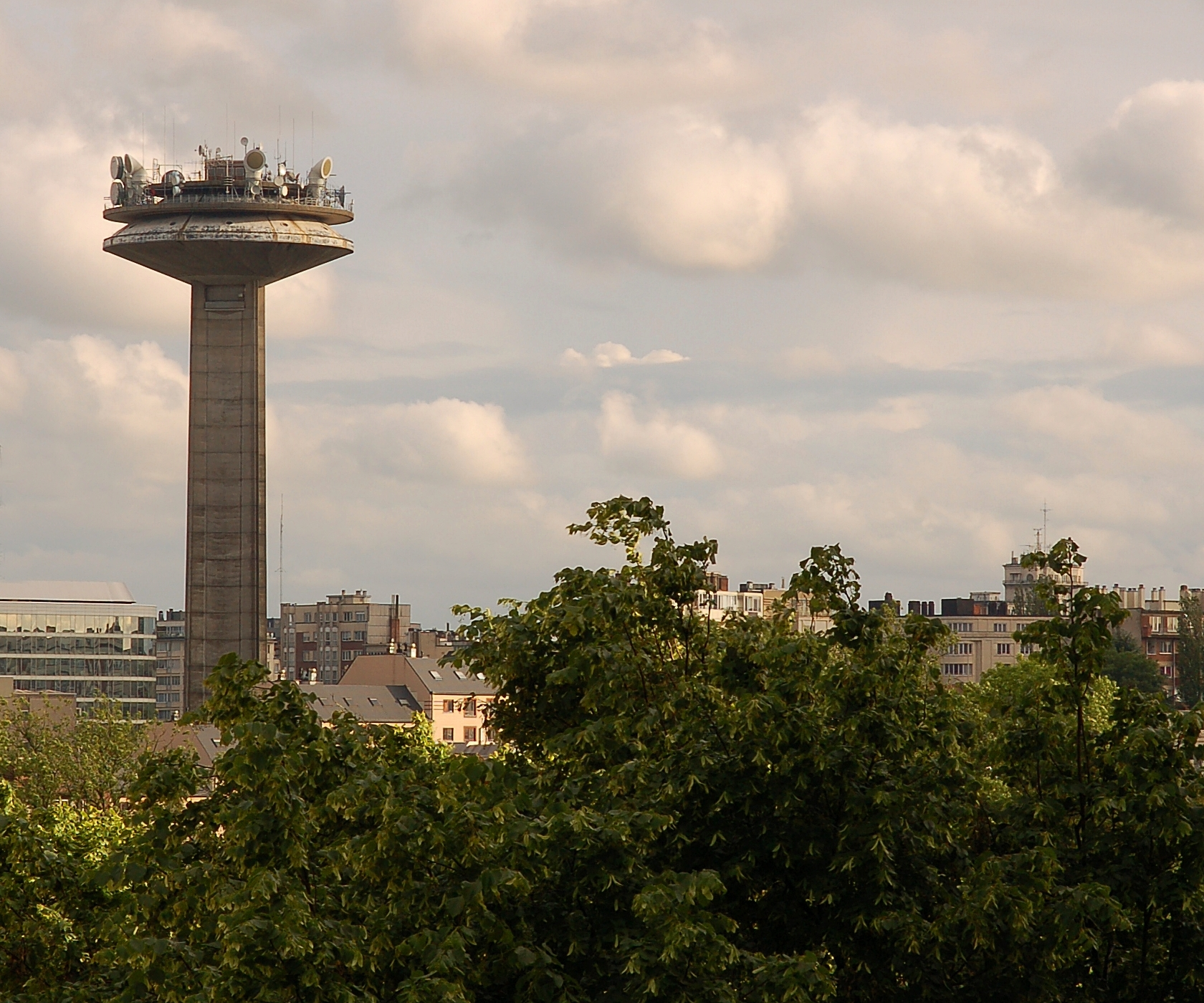
The communications tower at the RTBF's headquarters in Brussels

The National Institute of Radio Broadcasting (French: INR, Institut national belge de radiodiffusion; Dutch: NIR, Belgisch Nationaal Instituut voor de Radio-omroep), the state-owned broadcasting organisation was established by law on 18 June 1930, and from 1938 was housed in the Flagey Building, also known as the Radio House, a purpose-built building in the "paquebot" style of Art Deco architecture.

On 14 June 1940, the INR was forced to cease broadcasting as a result of the German invasion. The German occupying forces, who now oversaw its management, changed the INR's name to Radio Bruxelles. A number of INR personnel were able to relocate to the BBC's studios in London from where they broadcast as Radio Belgique / Radio België under the Office de Radiodiffusion Nationale Belge (RNB) established by the Belgian government in exile's Ministry of Information.

At the end of the war the INR and the RNB coexisted until 14 September 1945, when a Royal Decree merged the two and restored the INR's original mission. The INR was one of 23 broadcasting organisations that founded the European Broadcasting Union in 1950. Television broadcasting from Brussels began in 1953, with two hours of programming each day. Split along linguistic lines in 1960, the INR's French-language programming became RTB (Radio-Télévision Belge, Emissions françaises) and moved to new quarters at the Reyers building in 1967. The RTB's first broadcast in colour, Le Jardin Extraordinaire (a gardening and nature programme), was transmitted in 1971. Two years later, the RTB began broadcasting news in colour.

In 1977, broadcasting became a concern for Belgium's language communities, rather than the national government as a whole. Accordingly, the French-language section of the RTB became the RTBF (Radio-Télévision Belge de la Communauté française) and a second television channel was set up with the name RTbis. In 1979 RTbis became Télé 2. Along with French channels TF1, Antenne 2, FR3 and Swiss channel TSR, the RTBF jointly established the European French-speaking channel TV5 in 1984. On 21 March 1988, Télé 2 became Télé 21. On 27 September 1989 a joint-venture company of the RTBF and Vivendi was set up with the name Canal Plus TVCF, which subsequently became Canal Plus Belgique in May 1995. In 1993, Télé 21 was replaced by Arte/21 and Sports 21.

In mid-January 2010, the RTBF adopted the new branding of RTBF.be in its main logo. The change was made because of the growing importance of new media; the ".be" suffix stressed those new developments.

On 11 June 2013, the RTBF was one of the few European public broadcasters to join in condemning the closure of Greece's public broadcaster, ERT.

By 2011, the analogue systems for RTBF.be were planned to be phased out for Wallonia.

=== Bye Bye Belgium ===
On 13 December 2006, at 20:21 CET (19:21 UTC), the RTBF replaced an edition of its regular current affairs programme Questions à la Une with a fake special news report in which it was claimed that Flanders had proclaimed independence, effectively dissolving the Belgian state. The programme had been preceded by a caption reading "This may not be fiction", which was repeated intermittently as a subtitle to the images on the screen. After the first half-hour of the 90-minute broadcast, however – by which point RTBF.be's response line had been flooded with calls – this was replaced with a caption reading "This is fiction".

The video featured images of news reporters standing in front of the Flemish Parliament, while Flemish separatists waved the flag of Flanders behind them. Off to the side, Francophone and Belgian nationalists were waving Belgian flags. The report also featured footage of King Albert and Queen Paola getting on a military jet to Congo, a former Belgian colony.

The RTBF justified the hoax on the grounds that it raised the issue of Flemish nationalism, but others felt that it raised the issue of how much the public can trust the press.

=== Controversies ===
In September 2024, French Community of Belgium Minister of Media Jacqueline Galant criticized RTBF for airing a segment titled "How to be less racist?", which in her opinion was biased and lacked pluralism. Galant was in turn criticized by the European Federation of Journalists for alleged editorial interference.

RTBF notably caused controversy in January 2025 by delaying the broadcast of Donald Trump's second inaugural speech by two minutes, in order to prevent the live broadcast of statements inciting hatred. The decision was condemned as censorship by Reformist Movement party leader Georges-Louis Bouchez and prompted an investigation from Galant.

== Logo history ==
RTBF's third logo from late 1982–1994

RTBF's fourth logo from 1994–1997

RTBF's fifth logo from 1997–2005

RTBF's sixth and previous logo from 2005–2010.

RTBF's seventh and previous logo from 2005–2025.

== Television channels ==
Television channels are transmitted:

- On Hotbird satellite on TéléSAT, an encrypted pay satellite service.
- On cable: analogue and digital on all Belgian cable providers, as well as on cable in Luxembourg;
- On DSL lines through IPTV to Proximus, Scarlet and Billi customers, as well as PostTV in Luxembourg;
- On satellite free-to-air worldwide as a participant in francophone TV5Monde channel;
- On digital terrestrial television using DVB-T on UHF and VHF frequencies in Brussels and Wallonia.

=== Current channels ===
- La Une (Channel One): the RTBF's main channel television, formerly known as RTBF1; began in 1953 on VHF channel 10; in PAL color since 1973
- Tipik: formerly known as La Deux, RTBF La Deux, RTbis and Télé 21; began in 1977
- La Trois (Channel Three): the quality TV channel; began in 2007; there are no commercial adverts on this channel
- Arte Belgique: in collaboration with the Franco-German TV network Arte

=== Video on demand ===
The Video on demand (VOD) offer of the RTBF is available on several platforms:

- Web: Free VOD has been collected under the RTBF Auvio brand since 2016. Offering Catch up TV, allowing viewers to see all programs from the RTBF channels during 7 days after broadcast.
- IDTV: Free catch-up TV and pay VOD
- Mobile device: La Une and Tipik are available on several Belgian mobile networks.
- Video game consoles: PlayStation 3, PlayStation 4 and Xbox One

== Radio channels ==
The RTBF broadcasts radio channels in either analogue format (FM and digital format (using DAB and DVB-T). All channels are also broadcast live over the Internet.

=== Analogue and digital ===
Name	Type	VRT equivalent
La Première	news, information, talk and culture	Radio 1
VivaCité	general pop music, regional news and sport	Radio 2 and Sporza
Classic 21	classic rock and pop	Studio Brussel
Tipik	young and alternative pop music	Studio Brussel and MNM
Musiq'3	classical and jazz music plus opera	Klara
RTBF Mix	DAB station airing in Flanders, with a selection of programs from La Première, VivaCité and Classic 21	None

=== Digital-only channels ===
- Jam: Focus on music of the hip hop, indie rock, electronic, new jazz, urban, soundtrack, folk acoustic, neo soul and world music genres
- Viva+: Focus on music of the "Golden Sixties" and the 1970s
- VivaSport: Focus on live sports coverage and commentary

=== Streaming-only channels ===
- Classic 21 60s: Focus on the "Golden Sixties"
- Classic 21 70s: Focus on music from the 1970s
- Classic 21 80s Hits: Focus on hit music from the 1980s
- Classic 21 80s New Wave: Focus on new wave music from the 1980s
- Classic 21 90s: Focus on music from the 1990s
- Classic 21 Blues: Focus on blues
- Classic 21 Live: Focus on live music
- Classic 21 Metal: Focus on metal
- Classic 21 Noir Jaune Rock: Focus on rock
- Classic 21 Route66: Focus on route 66 related music
- Classic 21 Soul Power: Focus on soul
- Classic 21 Underground: Focus on underground music
- Musiq'3 Baroque: Focus on opera
- Musiq'3 Jazz: Focus on jazz
- Musiq'3 Top Du Classique: Focus on classic music
- Tarmac: Focus on urban music
- Tipik À l'anicienne: Focus on music from the 1990s and 2000s

They also have a TMC service transmitted on Classic 21.

== See also ==
- VRT
- List of television channels in Belgium
- Public Francophone Radios
