= Telephone numbers in Belgium =

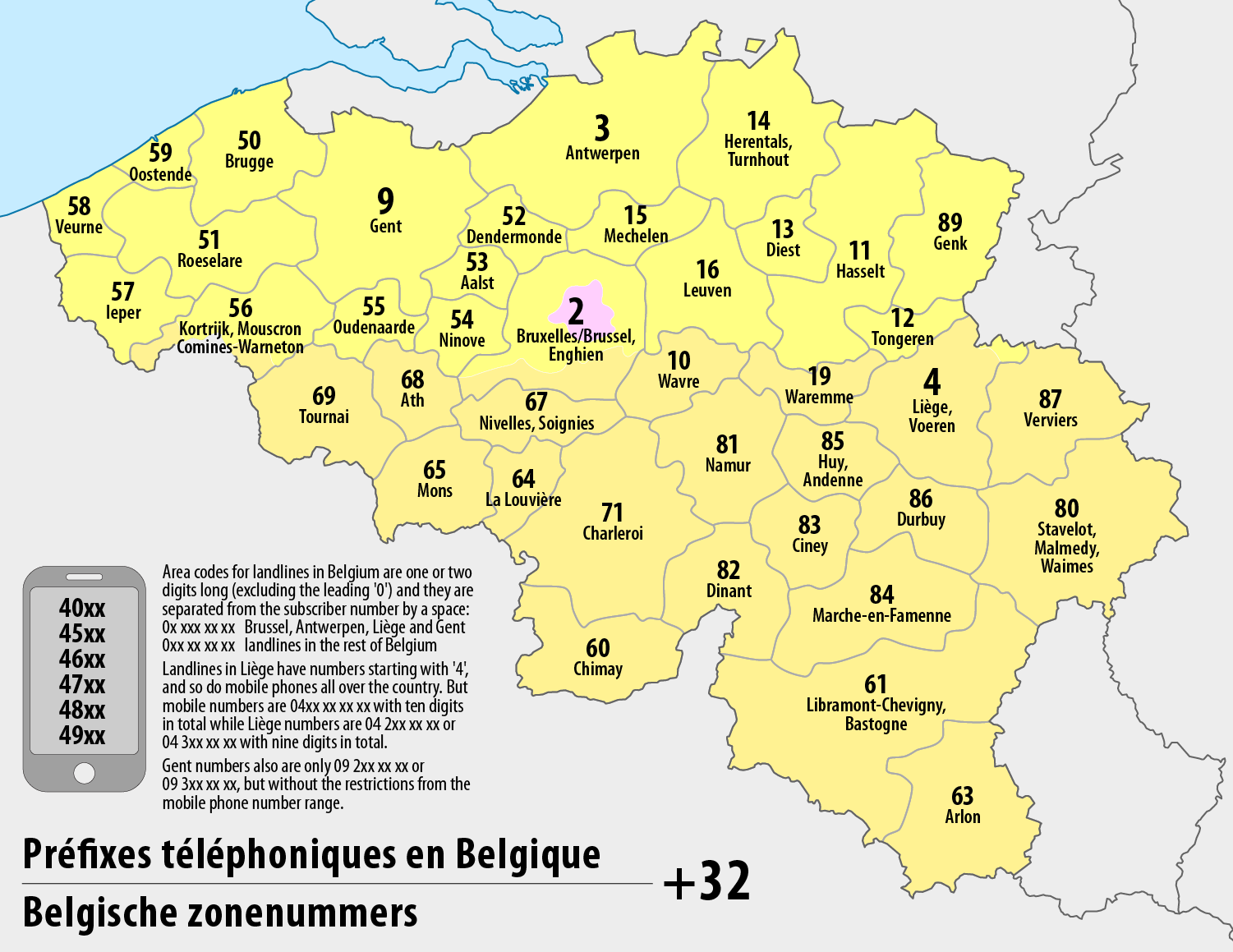
- Country: Belgium
- Continent: Europe
- Numbering plan type: Open
- Format: Geographical: 0x xxx xx xx 0xx xx xx xx Mobile: 045x xx xx xx through 049x xx xx xx
- Country code: 32
- International access: 00
- Long-distance: 0

A telephone number in Belgium is a sequence of nine or ten digits dialed on a telephone to make a call on the Belgian telephone network. Belgium is under a full number dialing plan, meaning that the full national number must be dialed for all calls, while it retains the trunk code, '0', for all national dialling.

Exception: Some "special services" use 3 or 4 digits with no area or trunk codes, e.g.: 112 and 100 (fire brigade and ambulance); 101 (police); 1307 (info in French) or 1207 (info in Dutch), etc.

"112" is an emergency number for contacting the fire brigade, ambulance and police in all 27 countries of the European Union. Operators will help the caller in the country's native language, in English, or the language of any neighbouring country. Calls to this number for contacting the police are forwarded to "101", losing response time.

The telephone numbering plan allows for numbers have varying lengths (9 digits for landline numbers, and 10 digits for mobile numbers).

== Overview and structure ==
Area codes in Belgium are, excluding the leading '0', one or two digits long. Numbers are of variable length; landlines have a seven-digit subscriber number and a one-digit area code for large cities, while smaller cities have a six-digit subscriber number and a two-digit area code. All Belgian telephone numbers dialed within Belgium must use the leading '0' trunk code. Area codes are separated from the subscriber number by a slash and a space, and subscriber number digits are in the format xxx xx xx or xx xx xx (sometimes xxx xxx), depending on the length of the area code

Examples

  0x xxx xx xx - dialing a big city, such as Brussels, Antwerp, Liège and Ghent.
 0xx  xx xx xx - dialing a small city, such as Kortrijk, Mons, Ostend, Aalst or Verviers
04xx  xx xx xx - dialing a mobile number from a landline or another mobile phone.

Remark that Liège shares the trunk number 04 for landlines with the mobile numbers prefix 045, 046, 047, 048, or 049. But landlines in Liège do not start with those sequences.

From outside Belgium, a caller dials their international call prefix (typically 00 in Europe and 011 in North America), followed by 32 (the country code for Belgium), then the area code minus the trunk code '0', and finally the local number.

Dialing from New York to Brussels
011-32-2-555-12-12 - Omitting the leading "0".

Dialing from New York to Charleroi
011-32-71-123-456 - The subscriber number shortens with the addition of a number to the area code.

Dialing from New York to a mobile number
011-32-4xx-12-34-56 - The dialer omits the leading "0".

Mobile/GSM area codes always begin with 04xx and the subscriber number is six digits long. Numbers are usually provided by Orange (formerly Mobistar), Base, or Proximus, and more recently by Telenet as well. Each provider has a unique number assigned as the second digit in the area code: Proximus numbers begin with 047x or 0460, Base numbers with 048x, Orange numbers with 049x and Telenet numbers with 0467 and 0468. With the introduction of number portability, both for landlines and mobile numbers, area codes may no longer correspond with their original providers or local switches.

== Landlines ==
- 010: Wavre (Waver)
- 011: Hasselt
- 012: Tongeren (Tongres)
- 013: Diest
- 014: Geel, Herentals, Turnhout
- 015: Mechelen (Malines)
- 016: Leuven (Louvain), Tienen (Tirlemont)
- 019: Waremme (Borgworm)
- 02: Brussels (Bruxelles/Brussel)
- 03: Antwerp (Antwerpen/Anvers), Sint-Niklaas
- 04: Liège (Luik), Voeren (Fourons)
- 050: Bruges (Brugge), Zeebrugge
- 051: Roeselare (Roulers)
- 052: Dendermonde (Termonde)
- 053: Aalst (Alost)
- 054: Ninove
- 055: Ronse (Renaix)
- 056: Kortrijk (Courtrai), Comines-Warneton (Komen-Waasten), Mouscron (Moeskroen)
- 057: Ypres (Ieper)
- 058: Veurne (Furnes)
- 059: Ostend, Bredene, Gistel (Oostende/Ostende, Bredene, Gistel)
- 060: Chimay
- 061: Bastogne (Bastenaken), Libramont-Chevigny
- 063: Arlon (Aarlen)
- 064: La Louvière
- 065: Mons (Bergen), Casteau
- 067: Nivelles (Nijvel), Soignies (Zinnik)
- 068: Ath (Aat)
- 069: Tournai (Doornik)
- 071: Charleroi
- 080: Stavelot
- 081: Namur (Namen)
- 082: Dinant
- 083: Ciney
- 084: Marche-en-Famenne
- 085: Huy (Hoei)
- 086: Durbuy
- 087: Verviers
- 089: Genk
- 09: Ghent (Gent/Gand)

Landlines in Liège have numbers starting with 04, and so do mobile phones all over the country. But mobile numbers are 04xx xx xx xx – 10 digits in total – while Liège numbers are 04 xxx xx xx – 9 digits in total. Landlines in Liège also never starts with 04 6x, 04 7x, 04 8x or 04 9x.

== Mobile numbers ==
Subscriber numbers may have been ported to another network, due to mobile number portability.

- 0455: mobile phone, Range is owned by Orange (for their brand VOO).
- 0456: mobile phone, Range is owned by Proximus (for their brand Mobile Viking).
- 0460: mobile phone, Range is owned by Proximus.
- 0465: mobile phone, Range is owned by Lycamobile.
- 0466: mobile phone, Range is owned by Orange (for their brand Hey!).
- 0467: mobile phone, Range is owned by Liberty Global (for their brand Telenet).
- 0468: mobile phone, Range is owned by Liberty Global (for their brand Telenet).
- 047x: mobile phone, Range is owned by Proximus.
- 048x: mobile phone, Range is owned by Liberty Global (for their brand BASE).
- 049x: mobile phone, Range is owned by Orange (for their brand Orange Belgium).

On some mobile phones, the caller ID may fail unless the leading 0 is replaced with a + and the country code, i.e. a caller's number 0474 12 34 56 might need to be manually replaced to +32 474 12 34 56 in your phone. More ranges have become available between 0440 and 0468. For the latest list refer to the BIPT reference.

== Non-geographic numbers ==
- 045x Premium numbers (€1.00/min).
- 070: Premium pay rate services (€0.30/min.)
- 077: Machine to machine communication
- 078: National pay rate services.
- 0800: toll free €0.00 call rate services.
- 090x - Premium pay rate numbers*:
  - 0900 (€0.50/min.).
  - 0901 (€0.50/call).
  - 0902 (€1.00/min.).
  - 0903 (€1.50/min.).
  - 0904 (€2.00/min.).
  - 0905 (€2.00/call).
  - 0906 (€1.00/min.).
  - 0907 (€2.00/min.).
  - 0909 (€31.00/call).

Number format:

07x/xxx.xxx 
0800/xx.xxx
090x/xx.xxx
