= Telecommunications in Belgium =

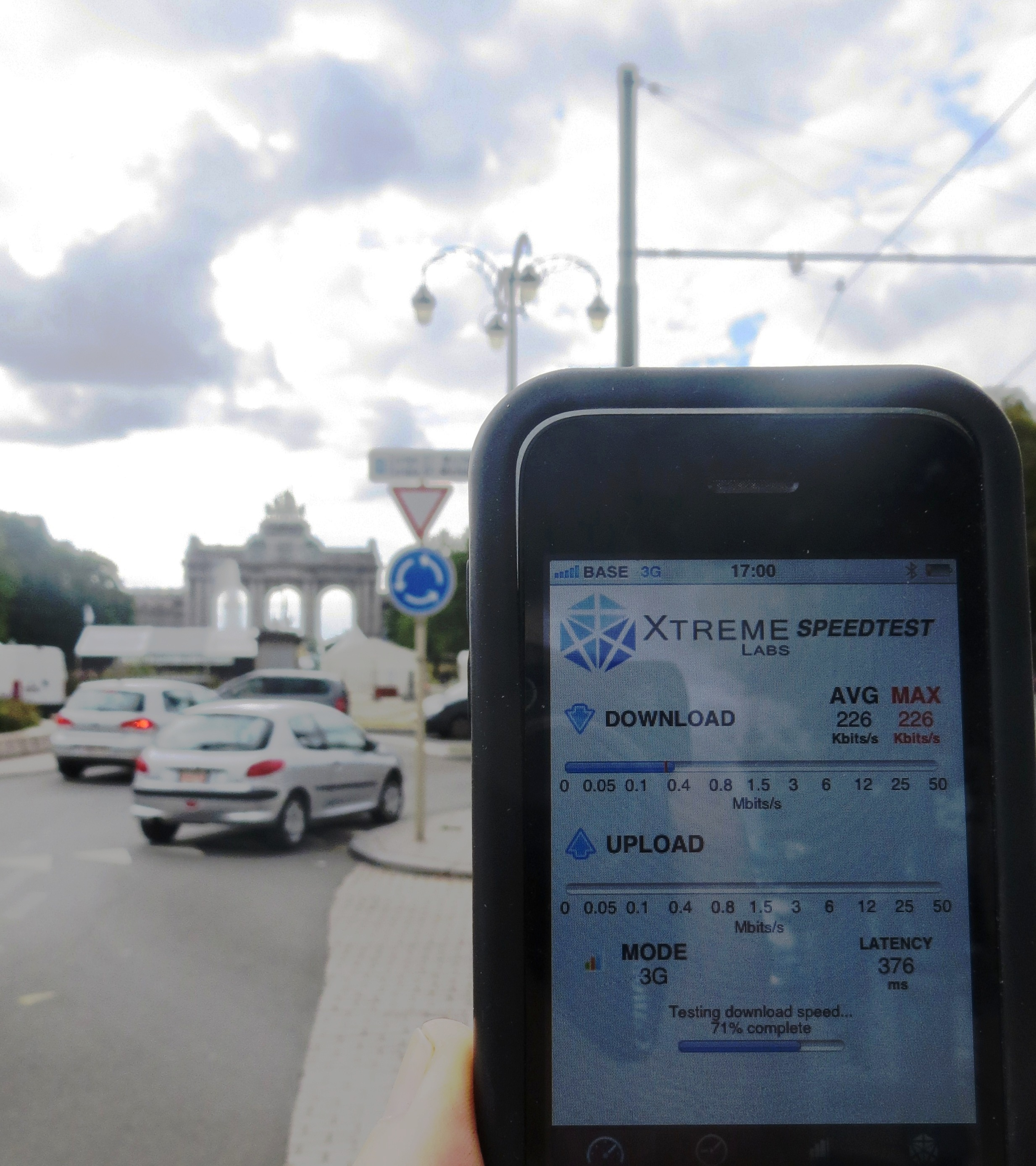
3G mobile data network speed test in downtown Brussels, September 2012. After 2 years of bans on new mobile basestations, the mobile network download speed is down at 0.25 Mbit/s.

Communications in Belgium are extensive and advanced. Belgium possesses the infrastructure for both mobile and land-based telecom, as well as having significant television, radio and internet infrastructure. The country code for Belgium is BE.

== Services ==
=== Mail ===
Mail regulation is a national competency. Postal service in Belgium is in many cases performed by Belgian Post Group, a semi-private public company. Competitors include DHL and UPS.

Postal codes in Belgium consist of four digits which indicate regional areas, e.g. "9000" is the postal code for Ghent.

=== Telephone ===
The telephone system itself is highly developed and technologically advanced, with full automation in facilities that handle domestic and international telecom. Domestically speaking, the county has a nationwide cellular telephone system and an extensive network of telephone cables. Telephone regulation is a national competency.

The country code for Belgium is 32 and the international call prefix is 00.

A telephone number in Belgium is a sequence of nine or ten numbers dialled on a telephone to make a call on the telephone network in Belgium. Belgium is under a closed telephone numbering plan, but retains the trunk code, "0", for all national dialling.

==== Fixed telephones ====
There were 4.668 million land telephone lines in use in Belgium in 2007, a slight decrease on the 4.769 million in use in 1997.

The majority state-owned public telephone company of Belgium is Proximus. Some other or private operators exist, as Scarlet (Proximus) and Base (Telenet).

==== Mobile telephones ====
Mobile telephone ownership has increased by nearly one thousand percent in the period 1997–2007, from 974,494 to 10.23 million.

There are three licensed mobile network operators (MNO) in Belgium, Proximus (Belgacom), Orange Belgium (Orange S.A.) and Telenet/Base and numerous mobile virtual network operators (MVNO).

A fourth license will be auctioned off by the government in January 2010.

=== Internet ===
There were 61 (2003) internet service providers in Belgium, serving 8.113 million internet users in 2009. The country code for Belgian websites is .be.

In September 2009 in Flanders there were 3,048,260 broadband internet customers (DSL and cable), of which 2,520,481 were residential users and 527,779 business users. Only 65,175 dial-up internet access accounts remained in the residential market and 9,580 in the business market.

==== Internet providers ====
===== xDSL Internet Providers =====
Belgium has numerous copper cable internet providers:

- Altercom *End service: 2011
- Proximus
- Base *End service: 2014
- Destiny
- Digiweb
- EDPnet
- Evonet
- Full Telecom
- Interxion
- iPFix
- LCL
- Mobistar (Orange S.A.) *End service : 2013
- Numericable (France Numericable)
- Perceval
- Portima
- Proximedia Group
- Scarlet (Belgacom)
- Verizon Business (Verizon Communications)
- Ergatel

Only Belgacom and Numericable currently offers fixed telephony and digital television in a triple play formula. All other companies offer also fixed telephony in a duo play formula.

===== Cable Internet Providers =====
Belgium has three major fiberglass cable internet providers:

- Numéricable for the Brussels region (Ypso Holding)
- Telenet for the Flanders and Brussels regions (Liberty Global)
- Base
- VOO for the Walloon and Brussels regions (TECTEO)
- Orange Belgium use Telenet and VOO network combined

These companies all offer fixed telephony and digital television in a triple play formula.

- Interoute Managed Services
- Interxion
- LCL
- Nucleus
- Verizon Business (Verizon Communications)

These companies all offer specialised services.

===== Terrestrial Internet Providers =====
- Clearwire in Brussels, Ghent, Leuven, Aalst, Halle and Vilvoorde (Sprint Nextel)
- Perceval

===== Satellite Internet Providers =====
- Verizon Business (Verizon Communications)

===== ISP for public services =====
- The Brussels Regional Informatics Center (BRIC, Centre d'Informatique pour la Région Bruxelloise in French) offers Internet access to public administrations in the Brussels-Capital Region, relying directly on the national Belnet network and the IRISnet network.

===== Not categorized =====
Other ISP are Chat.be, Connexeon, HostIT, Microsoft Belgium, Netlog, Ulysse, Ven Brussels, Rack66 (EUSIP bvba), WSD Hosting.

=== Other ===
The microwave relay network is, however, more limited. For international communications, Belgium has 5 submarine cables and a number of satellite earth stations, two of which are Intelsat, and one Eutelsat.
