= Streamz =

Flemish language Belgian OTT streaming platform

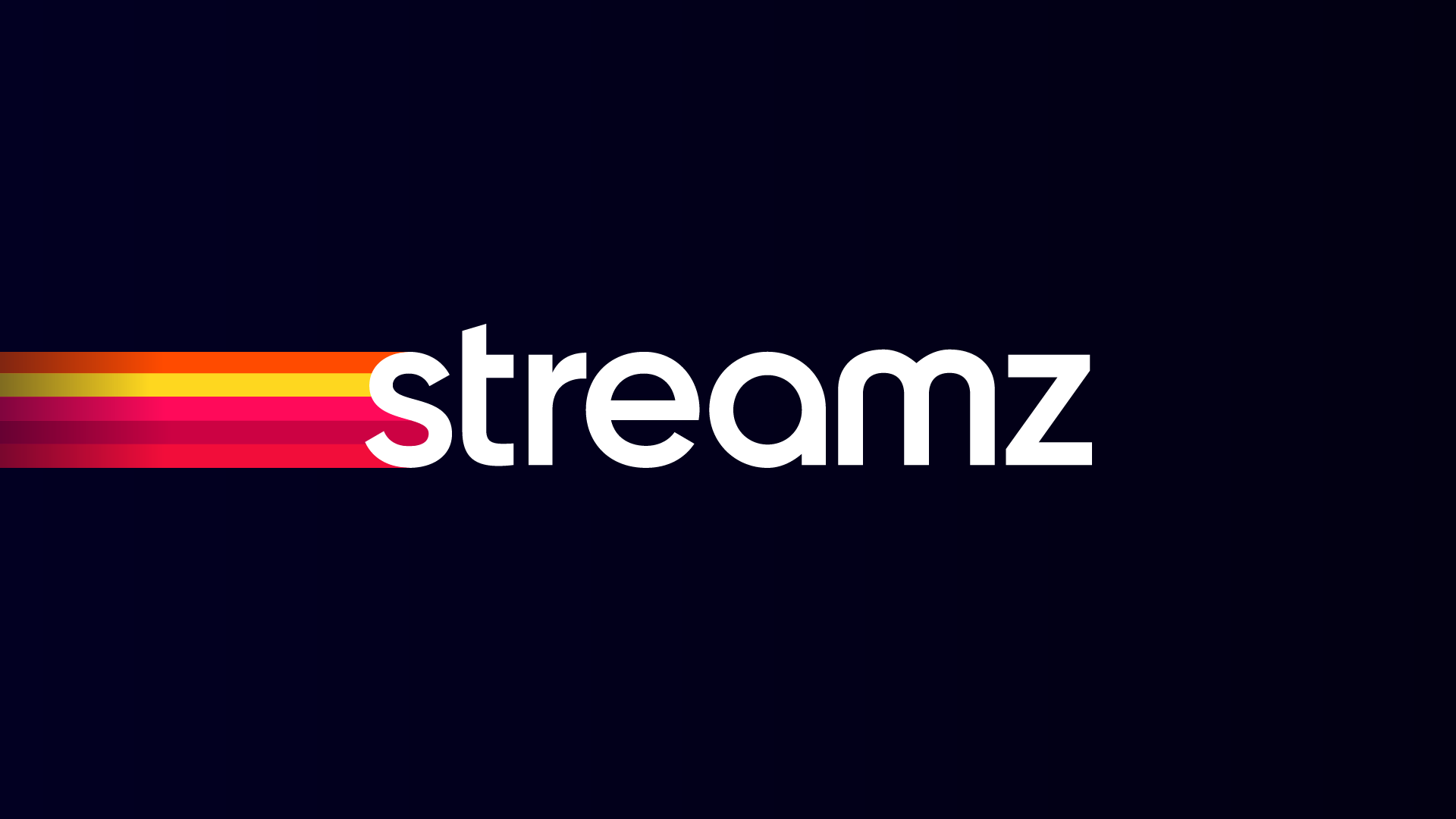
- Logo used since 2020
- Website type: OTT streaming platform
- Available in: Flemish Dutch
- Headquarters: Vilvoorde, Flemish Brabant, Flanders, Belgium
- Area served: Belgium (Note: Mostly aimed at Flemish speaking Belgium (Flanders and Brussels), but is available in Wallonia as well.)
- Owners: DPG Media (50%); Telenet Group (50%)
- CEO: Peter Vindevogel (CEO, 2020–2022); Bart De Groote (CEO, 2022–present)
- Website: www.streamz.be
- Launched: 1 September 2020; 6 years ago; 14 September 2020 (Broadcast Launch)

Streamz, is a Dutch-language Belgian OTT streaming platform, a joint venture between DPG Media and Telenet Group, which had a soft launch on 1 September 2020 and an official launch on 14 September 2020. The streaming service offers Flemish series for a fee, such as its own Streamz Originals and series from VRT, DPG Media, Play Media, both existing series and series in preview. In addition, this offer is supplemented with local productions and with international productions from, among others Paramount+, Showtime, Sony, BBC and Universal.

Streamz's growth was slow in the first few years, which included the launch of Disney+, another streaming service. But eventually, year after year, the Flemish streaming service is growing and the viewing figures are increasing.

== History ==
Streamz is the direct successor to Play More, which was fully owned by Telenet.

DPG Media, the owner of the VTM television channels and streaming platform VTM GO, suggested the creation of a "Flemish Netflix" as early as 2018. The goal was to create a single digital platform where Flemish viewers could watch local fiction. DPG Media feared that continuing to produce Flemish fiction would otherwise become unfeasible.

At the beginning of 2020 it became known that Telenet was also going to cooperate. Telenet is, among others, owner of the channels Play4, Play5, Play6 and Play7, and production house Woestijnvis.

The name of the streaming service was announced on 12 August 2020, after the project received approval from the European Commission.

The launch of Streamz on 14 September 2020 meant that Telenet customers' existing Play offering was converted to Streamz. The theme channels previously available via Play can only be viewed via Play More from 13 October 2020. However, people who have subscribed to Streamz via Telenet will retain the ability to watch up to 7 days of popular channels. Play More includes the plus version of Streamz Premium, Streamz Premium+, up to 7 days of replays on popular channels, the theme channels, the Play More film channels and access to extra films. The transformation from Play to Streamz and the fact that Play More includes Streamz+ within the subscription meant that Streamz did not have to start from scratch, but started with a base of approximately 431,300 subscribers.

== Collaborations ==
=== Forced cooperation with VRT ===
On 3 September 2020, VRT announced that they would also participate in Streamz. It was assumed that the streaming platform would not be viable without the support of VRT (and their catalogue of older programmes). The VRT was also under great pressure from the Flemish government to cooperate on a streaming platform and had already indicated in February 2020 that it was open to cooperation. However, the VRT wants to "focus primarily on its own platform 'VRT NU'" (known as VRT MAX in 2023). A final agreement was delayed for years, meaning no new previews of VRT programs were broadcast since the beginning of 2021. In 2023, after years of negotiations, the partnership was strengthened. This will make more programmes from the VRT catalogue available, and the company will collaborate on developing new series that will appear in preview on Streamz and will later be broadcast on VRT 1 and VRT MAX. Streamz and VRT also produce several co-productions, such as Kassa Kassa and Breendonk.

=== Foreign studios ===
Streamz has deals with several major studios such as CBS, Paramount Studios, Sony and Universal.

In 2021, Streamz signed an agreement with HBO to systematically offer content from its own streaming service, HBO Max. Due to this agreement, HBO Max itself did not initially operate in Flanders. This deal was also continued in 2023. In October 2023, it was announced that HBO Max would launch in Belgium in July 2024. Since then, Streamz has stopped offering new HBO series.

In November 2023, the deal with Paramount was expanded so that a large part of the Paramount+ catalog will gradually become available on Streamz from December 22, 2023.

== Subscription plans ==
Within Streamz there are three different types of subscriptions:

- Streamz Basic: The same offer as Streamz Premium, cheaper version with advertising in between.
- Streamz Premium: A selection of local productions in preview from VRT, DPG Media, and SBS Belgium, as well as exclusive programs, Streamz Originals, and existing Flemish programs supplemented with international programs from HBO, among others.
- Streamz Premium+: The same offering as Streamz, supplemented with recent blockbusters.

== Original Programming ==
Streamz has an offering consisting of exclusive programs (Streamz Originals) that can only be viewed via Streamz, in addition to previews of the VRT, DPG Media and Play Media channels. In addition, programs previously available exclusively through Play (More) can now be viewed on Streamz. This is how D5R became a Streamz Original.
