= Grupo Auna =

Telecommunications company

Grupo Auna was a telecommunications company that emerged from the former Retevisión, which was one of the two companies that were created in Spain in 1996 after the liberalization of telecommunications.

The group was divided into two parts in 2005; the mobile telephony group Amena, which was purchased by France Télécom and the rest was bought by ONO to a value of 2,200 million euros.

The group was formed by Amena (mobile), Auna (telephony and ADSL services) and AunaCable (Cable Services: Internet, television and telephone).

The cable service Tenaria was acquired in 2004.
