= Telecommunications in Timor-Leste =

Telecommunications Democratic Republic of Timor-Leste
Landlines (2006):	3,000
Mobile lines (2007):	103,000
ccTLD:	.tl
Calling code:	+670

== Telephones ==
Following Indonesia's withdrawal from Timor-Leste in 1999, the telecommunications infrastructure was destroyed in the ensuing violence, and Telkom Indonesia ceased to provide services. A new country code (670) was allocated to East Timor by the International Telecommunication Union, but international access often remained severely limited.

The calling code 670 was previously used by the Northern Marianas (the Northern Marianas, as part of the North American Numbering Plan, now uses the country code 1 and the area code 670).

Telephone calls are also often extremely expensive: for example, Telstra in Australia raised the cost of calls to Timor-Leste to A$3.00 a minute from 97 cents in 2003. In the UK, BT's standard rate is over £2 a minute.

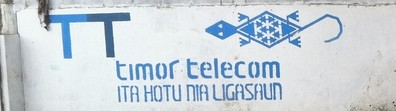
Timor Telecom advertisement

Telstra expanded its cellular telephone signal into Timor-Leste in 2000 and operated services until 2003, when Timor Telecom (TT), 50.1% part-owned by Portugal Telecom, began operating fixed-line and mobile telephone services. Until recently, the fixed-line network was mainly confined to the capital Dili, although this has been expanded nationwide, to each district capital.

According to a press release issued by Portugal Telecom in June 2008, the total number of fixed phones (landline) was 3,000 and mobile cellular was 103,000. At that time, there was no broadband or ADSL service.

In 2019, the World Bank reported that the total number of mobile cellular subscriptions is 1,425,256, or 110.2% of the population of Timor Leste, and the total number of fixed telephone subscriptions is 2,075, or 0.16% of the population.

In 2002, Timor Telecom signed a 15-year contract to invest US$29 million to rebuild and operate the phone system. The contract could be extended by 10 more years, totaling 25 years of monopoly. 2003 gross revenue totaled €10.5 million. In 2012 the government and TT agreed to end the contract, thus allowing the telecommunications market to be liberalised.

All voice and data are carried out by Intelsat, using a direct satellite link with one hop to their downlink in Portugal.

The telephone system suffered significant damage during the violence in the East Timorese independence. As a result, there is very little fixed-line service, and mobile-cellular service and coverage are limited primarily to urban areas.

Timor Telecom offers mobile GSM services covering approximately 92% of the population, 100% of the districts, and 57% of the sub-districts.

International service is available in major urban centers, but not much elsewhere.

On January 17, 2013, the Prime Minister of Timor-Leste, Mr. Xanana Gusmão, launched Telkomcel as the second telecommunication operator in Timor Leste with three main services:

1. Mobile Services
2. Corporate Solution
3. Wholesale & International Services'

Telkomcel is 100% owned by PT Telekomunikasi Indonesia International (TELIN).

== Radio ==
There are at least 21 radio stations in Timor-Leste. The main station is Radio Timor Leste, broadcasting in Tetum, Portuguese and Indonesian. Other radio stations include Radio Kmanek, and Radio Falintil, and Radio Renascença, while there are also FM retransmissions of RDP Internacional from Portugal, Radio Australia, and the BBC World Service. Community radio stations broadcast around the country, in regional languages such as Tokodede and Fataluku.

== Television ==
Timor-Leste has one national public broadcaster, Televisão Timor Leste or Televizaun Timor Lorosae, which broadcasts local programming in Tetum and Portuguese, as well as retransmissions of RTP Mundo from Portugal.

In May 2007, RTTL's television and radio services became available via satellite, using a transponder leased from Telkom Indonesia.

In February 2009, TVTL began carrying programmes from Rede Globo in Brazil.

== Internet ==
The first Internet connection in Timor-Leste was made by the United Nations APDIP Programme in 1999 to support UNTAET, the UN Transitional Administration. This consisted of a C Band link to Singapore Telecom. The initial bandwidth was 256 kbit/s.

The Internet country code for Timor-Leste is .tl. This code was officially changed from .tp (for Portuguese Timor) when the country achieved its independence on 20 May 2002.

There are three mobile operators in Timor-Leste providing the bulk of Internet connectivity to the population using 3G, HSDPA, and 4G LTE:

1. Telemor
2. Timor Telecom
3. Telkomcel

While ADSL and dedicated line infrastructure is offered by some of the operators, it is prohibitively expensive to install and is in most cases more expensive per GB than cellular options. Most individuals, organisations, and businesses thus rely on the cellular network for their Internet needs using smartphones, 4G modems and 4G routers.

A fourth operator, Ceslink has applied to the government for a license to become a telecom operator, but as of September 2019 offers no services to the public.

All operators rely on satellite communication for their uplink to the wider internet, which results in slow response times and drives up data prices. A project to physically connect Timor-Leste to Indonesia using a submarine fiber optic cable has been greenlit by the Government in 2018, but as of 2019, no progress appears to have been made.

Alternatively, in January 2022 it was announced Timor-Leste Telecommunications provider SACOMTEL had signed an agreement with global subsea cable systems provider Inligo Networks to become the landing partner for a new cable system between the US and Singapore called the Asia Connect Cable or ACC-1. The news was further confirmed by Inligo Networks some days later. The system is expected to connect the country in 2024.

According to the International Telecommunication Union, 13.4% of the population was connected to the internet with the vast majority of users using cellular internet. However, according to the World Bank, in 2015, 23% of the population is connected to the Internet. As of 2017, 27.493% of the population is connected to the Internet. According to Timor Telecom about 94% of the population is able to access cellular phone and internet services.

Timor Telecom has sought to block some voice over IP services on its network such as Skype, however in 2019 there is no evidence to suggest that any operators are blocking specific services or protocols.

The concept of net neutrality does not seem to apply to Timor-Leste's and operators. Telemor and Telkomcel offer heavily discounted social media packages, with a focus on services owned by Facebook. Telkomcel also offers their customers limited free access to services under the Internet.org umbrella.

=== Censorship ===
There are no government restrictions on access to the Internet or credible reports that the government monitors e-mail or Internet chat rooms. The law prohibits arbitrary interference with privacy, family, home, or correspondence and the government generally respects these prohibitions in practice.
