= Simpay =

SimPay was a consortium which was founded to promote mobile payment in 2003 but which was closed as of June 2005. Simpay started in Spain by a number of mobile phone companies to build an open, interoperable solution, but was abandoned when key members pulled out in 2005.

== History ==
In February 2003, T-Mobile, Orange, Telefónica and Vodafone formed a new Mobile Payment Services Association (MPSA) with the goal to deliver an open, interoperable and commonly branded solution for payments via mobile phones, designed to work across all operator networks. In June 2003 the consortium re-branded itself as SimPay.

In February 2005, Amena and Proximus joined the consortium.

Simpay planned to create a pan-European framework whereby merchants and content resellers would be able to charge for products and services directly to a subscriber's bill.

In June 2005, Simpay decided, "following the decision of one of its founding Members not to launch Simpay for the foreseeable future, [...] not to pursue its activity on a pan-European scale as originally planned." All activities were put on hold effective June 24, 2005.

The UK Simpay founders started work in 2005 on a project called "Payforit" which was launched in 2007 to provide similar services in the UK.
