= Retevisión =

Defunct Spanish telecommunications company

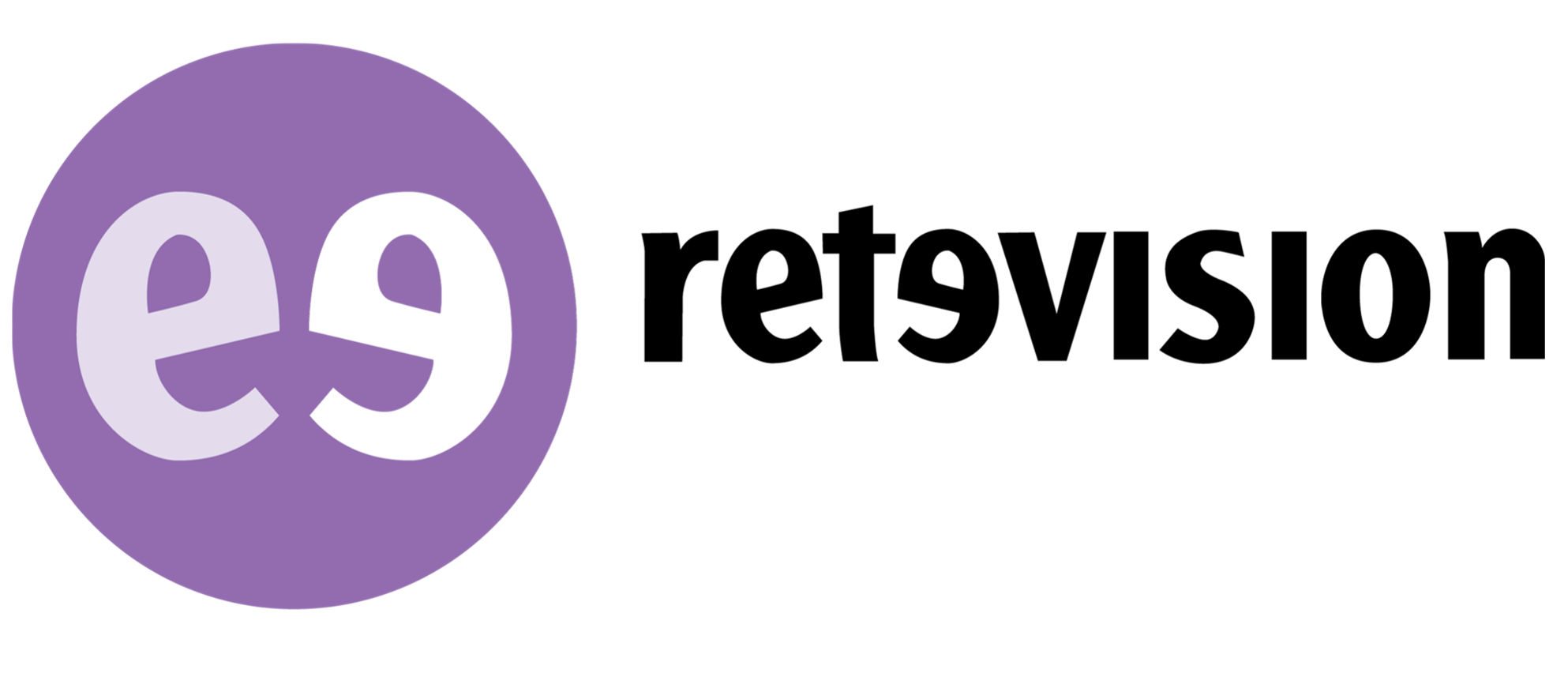
Second Retevisión logo, used from 1998 until 2002

Retevisión was a Spanish telecommunications company; of which a portion of it continues to exist as Cellnex Telecom, which was spun off from Abertis in 2015.

== History ==
Retevisión was founded in 1989 as a public company, a division of the national public broadcaster Radiotelevisión Española (RTVE). Its original mission was to provide transmission facilities for television and radio signals throughout Spain.

In 1996, the First Aznar government of the People's Party decided to liberalise the Spanish telecommunications market, and a license was granted to Retevisión.

In 1997, it was decided to move the company headquarters from Madrid to Barcelona. That same year Retevisión was acquired by Telecom Italia and the Spanish electricity utilities Endesa and Union Fenosa.

The company was operating without its own landline network, and users of Telefónica that were Retevision subscribers needed to prepend the prefix 050, which was later replaced by 1050, to the number in order to route calls to Retevisión.

At first, customers could only call other provinces with Retevisión. With the liberalisation of the local loop in September 1998, Retevisión customers could make local calls.

That same year, Retevisión bought two pioneering Spanish internet service providers Servicom and RedesTB, and launched their own ISP under the brand iddeo.

In June 1998 the company obtained Spain's third license for mobile telephony (after Movistar and Airtel Móviles), and began operations in 1999 under the brand name Amena through its subsidiary Retevisión Móvil.

Throughout 1999 it also launched data services over IP for enterprises (VPN networking sites), and direct voice and data by radio link, although the latter services had little success.

In Summer 2000, iddeo launched ADSL services for businesses.

In the Basque Country, Euskaltel from its launch in 1995 retained its distribution exclusivity versus Retevisión therefore fixed telephony and the transmission of radio and television signals was performed by Euskaltel.

The brand Retevisión as a telephony operator was abandoned in 2002 in favour of the new name Auna, a merger between Retevisión and the cable operator AunaCable (both companies being part of Grupo Auna). In 2005, the cable television, fixed telephony and ISP portions of Auna were absorbed by the operator ONO. In 2006, France Télécom acquired the mobile telephony operations of Amena, which led to the creation of Orange España on 1 August that same year.

Retevisión's remaining audiovisual-related portfolio was then sold by Grupo Auna to Abertis in 2003, which subsequently spun off that particular business into a new company called Cellnex Telecom in 2015.
