= Timor Telecom =

East Timorese telecommunications company

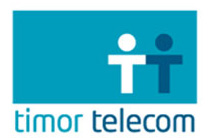
- Company type: Sociedade Anónima
- Industry: Telecommunications
- Founded: 17 October 2002; 23 years ago
- Headquarters: Timor Plaza; Dili, Timor-Leste
- Area served: Timor-Leste
- Key people: Manuel Joaquim Capitão Amaro (CEO)
- Products: Fixed line and mobile telephony, internet
- Owner: Government of Timor-Leste (77.65%)
- Website: www.timortelecom.tl

Timor Telecom, S.A. (TT) is an East Timorese telecommunications company, based in the national capital Dili.

The company originally had a state monopoly on telecommunications in Timor-Leste. The monopoly was lifted by the government in 2010 in response to overwhelming public opinion in favour of liberalisation.

== Shareholdings ==
As of December 2019, the largest shareholder of the company (54.01%) was Telecomunicações Públicas de Timor, S.A. (TPT), which was controlled by Oi, a Brazilian company owned by Timorese businessman Abilio Araújo, with partners and capital from the Middle East and China.

The shareholders of TPT were Oi (76%), the Harii Foundation – Sociedade para o Desenvolvimento de Timor-Leste (linked to the Roman Catholic Diocese of Baucau) (18%), and Fundação Oriente (6%).

Oi held a further 3.05% of TT via another company, PT Participações SGPS, S.A. The remaining shareholders in TT were the State of Timor-Leste (20.59%), VDT Holding Limited, a Macau-based company (17.86%) and East Timorese businessman Júlio Alfaro (4.49%).

In May 2023, Oi sold the majority stake it held in Timor Telecom for US$21.1 million to the Timorese government. Control of Timor Telecom was exercised by the companiesː TPT, which owned 54.01% of the company's shares, and PT Participações, with 3.05%. Both are controlled (TPT) or wholly owned (PT) by Oi. With the sale, the State of Timor-Leste increased its stake in the company from 20.59% to 77.65%.

== History ==
In September 1999, the telecommunications infrastructure in East Timor was destroyed during the crisis following the East Timorese independence referendum. In 2001, the United Nations Transitional Administration in East Timor (UNTAET) launched an international tender for the construction of a replacement telecommunications system. The new network was to be operated according to a concession agreement as a BOT (Build–operate–transfer) arrangement. In July 2002, the Timor Telecom consortium (led by Portugal Telecom) was awarded the tender.

On 17 October 2002, the Timor Telecom consortium was transformed into Timor Telecom, S.A., the first corporation to be formed in the newly independent Timor-Leste. Under the concession agreement, TT was granted a monopoly on telecommunications in Timor-Leste for a term of 15 years.

By 1 March 2003, the company had created Timor-Leste's first national telecommunications network, and set up its country code, +670. On that day, the company began operating the network in Dili, Lospalos, Baucau and Oecusse. By the end of 2003, landline, mobile and internet services were available on the network, and the company had opened its first store in Dili. The following year, the company started operating a telecommunications station on Atauro, and opened stores in Baucau and Gleno.

In 2005, further stores followed in Maliana, Suai and Pante Macassar. In 2006, independent Timor-Leste's first phone book appeared. The following year, 2007, the first yellow pages were published (also online) and voice mail was first offered. By 2008, the company had 125,000 mobile customers. In 2009, it engaged ZTE, a Chinese equipment supplier, to expand its mobile telecommunications system and establish Wideband CDMA.

In March 2010, the East Timorese government approved a new telecommunications policy, under which telecommunications would be liberalised. TT's monopoly was to be ended in response to overwhelming public opinion in favour of liberalisation, and in line with developments in the European Union and other countries in the Pacific such as South Korea. In 2012, the government and the company signed an agreement for the early end of the monopoly.

On 2 October 2013, Portugal Telecom and Oi, S.A., a Brazilian telecommunications company, announced that they would combine operations to form a new Brazil-based business. In 2015, the merged company's assets in Portugal were sold to Altice to reduce debt; the merged company retained its interests in TT. In June 2016, Oi filed for a US$19 billion (R$65 billion) bankruptcy protection, the largest on record for Brazil. In December 2016, Oi sought approval from a Rio de Janeiro district court to sell its stake in TT to Investec, and in March 2017 the court gave its approval, subject to an assessment that the amount Investec had offered was appropriate. However, the deal was not completed.

Meanwhile, TT, now operating under the new liberalised telecommunications policy, expanded its range of services and steeply reduced its prices. In 2013, it introduced three new customer plans, completed the renovation of all of its existing stores, and opened a new call centre at Timor Plaza. Since then, the company has introduced new technologies, including an improved internet concept and a high speed internet mobile service.

Timor Telecom began deploying its 4G LTE network in September 2017, utilising the 1800 MHz (Band 3) frequency. This high-speed service was made available in all 13 districts of Timor-Leste, achieving territorial coverage of 70% by the end of the rollout.

== Services and coverage ==
TT offers landline and mobile voice and internet services, under a variety of plans. As of 2015, the company covered about 94% of Timor-Leste's population with mobile network and internet services, and had about 632,500 customers for those services.

== See also ==
- Telecommunications in Timor-Leste
