= ZES =

ZES may stand for:

- ZENworks Endpoint Security Management, a computing-security product
- Zollinger–Ellison syndrome, a disease of the digestive system
- ZES (television channel), a Belgian television channel
