= Telenet Group =

Largest provider of cable broadband services in Belgium

Telenet group
- Industry: Telecommunications
- Founded: 1996
- Headquarters: Mechelen, Belgium
- Key people: John Porter (chief executive officer)
- Products: Digital television Broadband Internet; Fixed telephony Mobile telephony IT-services
- Revenue: €2.839,6 million (2025)
- Owner: Liberty Global
- Number of employees: 3543 (2025)
- Parent: Liberty Global
- Website: telenet.be

Telenet Group N.V. is the largest provider of cable broadband services in Belgium. Its business comprises the provision of analog and digital cable television, fixed and mobile telephone services, primarily to residential customers in Flanders and Brussels. In addition, Telenet offers services to business customers all across Belgium and in Luxembourg under its brand Telenet Solutions.

Telenet was purchased in 2000 by Dick Callahan's telecommunications holding company, Callahan Associates International, in a deal valued at $969 million at the time.

Since 11 October 2005, Telenet was listed on the Euronext Brussels stock exchange under the ticker TNET, until it was acquired by Liberty Global on October 16 2023.

== Internet ==
Logo as of 1998

Logo as of 2002

Telenet has offered its residential service since 1997 under the brand name Telenet Internet through the combination of its broadband cable network, which passes some 2.4 million homes in Flanders and a part of the Brussels region. All of the networks through which Telenet offers residential services in Flanders have been upgraded to a two way digital hybrid fibre-coaxial (HFC) standard, and Telenet has direct relationships with all of its Internet and telephony customers.

Its main competitors on the cable broadband Internet market are Numericable and VOO in the Brussels region, and Proximus, the leader of the Belgian DSL market in the Flanders and Brussels regions.

Telenet also offers voice, data and Internet services to its business customers under the brand name Telenet Solutions through its optical fiber backbone, by its acquisition of Codenet, which covers all of Belgium and Luxembourg.

Through its acquisition of Sinfilo, Telenet acquired a large network of Wi-Fi hotspots in addition to its cable Internet service.

In December 2016, Telenet submitted a proposal for the acquisition of SFR Belux from Altice, which has been authorized on 20 June 2017. This acquisition allowed Telenet to enter in the Wallon market and a serious presence in the Francophone market.

=== Hosting services ===
In January 2008, Telenet acquired Hostbasket, Belgium's largest hosting company, to offer services appropriate for organisations and companies. Hostbasket offers "classic hosting" (domain names, shared webhosting, online backup, antivirus), infrastructure (dedicated servers, co-location) and applications (hosted Exchange, hosted SharePoint, hosted CRM).

== Telephony ==
=== Fixed telephony ===
Since 1998, Telenet has offered fixed telephony using its cable network under the brand name Telenet Freephone. In 2008, it has more than 600,000 customers. Its main competitors on the Belgian fixed telephone market are Numericable and VOO in Brussels, using optic fibre. Its other main competitor is Proximus, leader of the Belgian DSL market.

It has released FreePhone Mobile in November 2011. This is a free option which allows its customers to call all mobile lines for free during the morning and evenings. An extra option called FreePhone Mobile 24 is available as well. This allows customers to call mobile lines all day.

=== Mobile telephony ===
Since July 2006, Telenet Mobile offers mobile telephony services as a full MVNO, using the Mobistar MNO-network (now Orange Belgium). Today it has more than 80,000 customers. It competes with the mobile network operators Proximus, owned by the Belgian state owned telecommunications company Proximus Group.

In 2009, Telenet acquired the Belgian retail store network of BelCompany from the Dutch Macintosh Retail Group.

In 2011 Telenet and Voo formed a new company, Telenet Tecteo BidCo, to participate in the auction for obtaining the fourth 3G license on the Belgian market. As there were no other bidding parties they obtained this license for €71.5 million.

In 2015 Telenet acquired the mobile operator BASE from its previous owner KPN for €1.325 billion.

=== Acquisition of Eltrona ===
In December 2022, it was announced Telenet has acquired the Luxembourgish telecommunications company, Eltrona. It was the first time Telenet had taken full control of a telecommunications company outside of Belgium.

== Television ==
=== Cable television ===
Telenet launched Telenet Digital TV interactive television on its cable television network on 3 September 2005.

Since 2012–2013 cable customers need not pay an extra subscription to receive digital TV, but they must purchase or rent a set-top box in order to view the digital TV channels and to use the interactive services based on the Multimedia Home Platform.

Telenet also rolled out high definition television services during 2008.

In July 2008 Telenet reached an agreement with Interkabel's INDI regarding the acquisition of its 800,000 cable TV customers.

Its main competitors on the Belgian digital television market (DVB-C) are Numericable and VOO in the Brussels region. Other competitors are Proximus TV IPTV and TV Vlaanderen Digitaal (DVB-S/DVB-T2), owned by Proximus and an Airbridge Investments -Providence Equity Partners consortium, in the Flanders and Brussels regions.

Telenet and North American digital media & broadcasting company Vice Media both launched a local version of US TV channel Viceland (itself owned by Vice and later rebranded to Vice TV) in Belgium on 2 March 2017. It closed down 25 Augustus 2020

==== Set-top boxes ====
The Digibox (set-top box) and Digicorder (personal video recorder) are made by Advanced Digital Broadcast. Starting in 2007, Telenet started replacing the Digibox and Digicorder with HD versions, also made by Advanced Digital Broadcast.

In 2019, Telenet launched the TV-box, a 4K successor to the Digibox and Digicorder. No longer made by Advanced Digital Broadcast, the TV-box is part of the Horizon 4 platform of majority stakeholder Liberty Global. Even though it is a successor to the Digicorder, it no longer houses a hard drive and instead is a cloud PVR-device. While it is still a DVB-C recorder, it requires an internet connection (unlike the Digibox and Digicorder) as both recordings and VOD-content are provided via streaming instead of the harddrive and DVB-C respectively.

==== Pay TV ====
Telenet also offers several premium TV channel packs including:

- Streamz (including access to Streamz & a timeshifting service for linear channels. Formerly Play)
- Streamz+ (including access to Streamz+ & a timeshifting service for linear channels)
- Play More (including Streamz+, 3 Play More-channels, premium channels, Stingray Music & a timeshifting service for linear channels)
- Play Sports (including 6 Play Sports-channels, Eleven Pro League & Eleven Sports. Also available as Pay-per-view)
- BeTV (also including Ciné+)
- BeTV Sport (including VOO Sport World & Eleven Sports)
  - Option VOO Sport (including Eleven Pro League)
- Option FR (Flanders Only)
- Be Bouquet Family Fun (including channels, Brussels & Wallonia only)
- Be Bouquet Discover More (including channels, Brussels & Wallonia only)
- Bouquet Arabe (including channels, Brussels & Wallonia only)
- Bouquet Africain (including channels, Brussels & Wallonia only)
- Passion XL

The French bouquets are provided from VOO.

=== Digital Terrestrial Television: Teletenne ===
On 21 June 2012, Telenet launched its pay TV digital terrestrial television based on DVB-T technology, called Teletenne. The service has been closed down in 2014 due to low success.

=== Television channels: Play Media ===
In 2014, Telenet acquired a 50% share of De Vijver Media from Sanoma, which owns SBS Belgium with the channels VIER and VIJF.

On 6 October 2016, SBS launched a third channel: ZES. SBS Belgium and Mediahuis co-launched a Flemish version of the radio NRJ on 3 September 2018.

In 2018, Telenet acquired the shares of De Vijver Media's two other shareholders, Mediahuis and the duo Wouter Vandenhaute and Erik Watté, taking it full control of SBS Belgium.

On 28 January 2021, Vier, Vijf and Zes were rebranded as Play4, Play5, Play6 and the launch of a new free online video-on-demand service GoPlay, and a fourth channel Play7 launching on 2 April.

In 2023, SBS Belgium is renamed to Play Media. Play Media is since 2023 also co-owner of radio Play Nostalgie.

=== Streaming ===
On 14 September 2020, Telenet & DPG Media launched streaming service Streamz. It includes series & movies previously available on Telenet's Play-subscription (such as HBO content), original programming & content from VTM, SBS Belgium (a Telenet subsidiary), VRT and international studios. For an additional cost, subscribers can get access to Streamz+ including recent blockbuster movies.

The service is available either through Telenet or Streamz itself. Customers that subscribe through Telenet can access the service through their set-top boxes (and the accompanying app and website) and Streamz (website and app), but subscribing via Streamz only allows access through the Streamz-platform.

== Ownership ==
Liberty Global own a 100% stake in Telenet.

== Sponsorship ==
Telenet is the principal sponsor of the Belgian football club KV Mechelen and a secondary sponsor of Club Brugge, another Belgian football club, and the Belgian Fidea Cycling Team. Both football clubs are active in the Belgian Pro League. Telenet is a title sponsor of the Telenet UCI Cyclo-cross World Cup from the 2016–2017 season.
