= Portability =

Portability may refer to:

- Portability, estate tax exclusion amount
- Portability (social security), the portability of social security benefits
- Software portability, degree to which a software component can be adapted to different platforms
- Telephone number portability (disambiguation), keeping one telephone number while switching one's account to another telephony provider

== See also ==
- Porting, the process of adapting software to another platform
- Portlet, user-interface software component displayed in a web portal
- Portable (disambiguation)
