= Construction field computing =

Use of handheld IT devices to manage construction sites

Construction field computing is the use of handheld devices that augment the construction superintendent's ability to manage the operations on a construction site. These information appliances (IA) must be portable devices which can be carried or worn by the user, and have computational and connectivity capacity to perform the tasks of communication management. Data entry and retrieval must be simple so that the user can manipulate the device while simultaneously moving, observing events, studying materials, checking quality, or performing other tasks required. Examples of these devices are the PDA, tablet PC modern tablet devices including iPad and Android Tablets and smartphone.

== Usage of information appliances in construction ==
Superintendents are often moving about the construction site or between various sites. Their responsibilities cover a wide variety of tasks such as:

- Comparing planned to constructed conditions.
- Carrying out in-field quality inspections ( punch lists or snagging as it is called in the UK)
- Capturing data about such defects and communicating it to the relevant sub-contractors.
- Coordinating and scheduling events and material delivery.
- Monitoring jobsite conditions and correcting safety deficiencies, improving efficiency, and ensuring quality.
- Recording and documenting work progress, labor, inspections, compliance to specifications, etc.
- Communicating direction to specialty contractors, laborers, suppliers, etc.
- Clarifying plans and specifications, resolving differing conditions, adapting methods and materials to site-specific requirements.

These tasks require that information is readily accessible and easily communicated to others and the company database. Since construction sites are unique, the device and system must be adaptable and flexible. Durability, predictability, and perceived value by the field management will determine the system's acceptance and thus proper use. Construction personnel are not well known for adapting to new technologies, but they do embrace methods that are proven to lighten work load and increase income.

Construction industry field personnel were quick to adopt new technologies such as the FAX machine and mobile phone, they have been slower to embrace the PC, tablet PC, PDA, and other devices. Disruptive technology is usually difficult in construction field use for several reasons:

- Field managers have often risen 'through the ranks' and learned from their predecessors how to run a construction site.
- They commonly do not have exposure to higher education and the new methods and technologies being developed.
- Field work is demanding and varied such that suitable and durable technologies are difficult to build. Failure of the device or system means schedule slip and increase costs so that using the new technology can be untenable.
- Laborers generally are not highly educated and willing to invest time in change.
- Construction is very schedule driven and time for training or learning new methods is rare. The learning curve is perceived to be too steep to justify implementing new technologies or methods not mandated by governing authorities or required by the contract documents.

Overcoming these issues is imperative for most construction firms. The augmentation and automation of managerial practices is required to make the construction process more efficient. The information appliance makes it possible field supervisors to access needed information, communicate requirements to others, and document the process effectively.

== Connectivity and computing power ==
An effective device will be able to process data into actionable information and transmit data and information to other devices or persons. The device may not actually perform computation of final communication, but it must appear as though it does. Extra steps to upload and download information will be perceived as a nuisance or waste of time to the user and cause the device to be underutilized. Some IAs are self-contained in that they have computing capacity and software to perform required tasks independent of a server or other devices. Others rely on connectivity with other devices and/or a server to perform required functions.

=== Communication with home office ===
==== Fat client ====
A fat client refers to a device that has sufficient speed and size to run programs and is loaded locally with software needed for operation. It can stand alone. Some advantages of this type of system are:

- No need for continuous Wi-Fi, Bluetooth, cell connection or other connectivity instrument for continuous operation. Data and operating functions are fully self-contained.
- User generally has more control over the interface so is able to adapt it to his/her own preferences and operational needs.
- User has perception of governance. The idea that another device or a central server controls the process is disturbing to many free-spirited construction personnel.
- Can be faster operationally than thin client since the device does not need to wait for transmitting data and server access time. With a good connection signal, however, this difference will most likely not be noticeable.

==== Thin client ====
A thin client refers to a device that acts as a terminal or interface with a server or other device. Sometimes called dumb terminal, these devices do not have sufficient computing capacity or data storage capacity of process information, but only allow the user to access the software and data needed by them. Some advantages of this type of system are:

- Real-time data. User both provides and has access to most current information. Information entered is immediately available to other users of the information through the central database. Updates from all contributors to the database are available immediately to the user.
- Automated and instantaneous action. Communication or directives are performed and recorded instantly rather than occurring when the information is uploaded by the user.
- More central control over information, operating systems, and the manner in which data is collected.
- Lower software and hardware costs since only minimal computing capacity is needed on the thin client device and separate software for each unit is not required.
- Thin client device is not useful as a stand-alone so that it is not attractive to fencers and thus a less likely target of theft. (Thieves generally know which items are worth stealing.) Stolen devices are unlikely to be usable to non-authorized personnel. Therefore, proprietary information is protected.
- Poka-yoke or error reduction strategies for data entry are more easily accomplished with a standardized system that cannot be easily altered by the user. A well-designed system will identify possible errors such as entering letters when numbers are required, identifying answers generally inconsistent with field, etc.
- More fully automates data transmission. Synchronization is not required as a separate activity which can be forgotten or take longer than the user wants to wait for.

==== Transparency and user friendliness ====
Computer transparency is important in construction because of the requirements listed in the 'usages' section in this article. Especially important here are the lack of training in computer sciences and need to remain focused on the job-site activities. Any suitable device and system should support the user without their understanding of the technical aspects of the computer or system. Any data functions operations must require no knowledge of the database schema. Response to commands or input should be immediate and reversible so that the user can quickly experiment and learn by doing without causing damage to the system or data. The user will most often feel that access to information and control over the system is not unduly limited. These traits will reduce user anxiety and encourage usage and acceptance of new technologies and systems.

User friendliness is needed due to the varied level of knowledge of the user. The functional options should be easily labeled and structured such that the user can understand by viewing the screen and by intuition. Usability will in large part determine whether or not the device and/or system is utilized. An ineffective tool is not only useless, but can be deleterious in that it takes time from the user, but does not return value. Even if the user only perceives the operation of the device to be worthless, he/she will be 'demotivated' to use the device and do so improperly or insufficiently. This will render the activity useless, fulfilling the expectation of failure.

== Portable devices available ==
=== Laptop and tablet PC ===
Laptop or notebook computers are small enough to be carried around the construction site, but too big to do so comfortably. Other disadvantages include:

- They must be set down on a suitable surface to be used.
- Require the use of both hands for proper operation.
- Most laptops are not durable enough to stand up to the dirt, moisture, and rough handling prevalent on most job sites. Those that are 'construction resistant' are too expensive and a target of theft.

The tablet PC is basically a scaled down laptop with a touch screen that accepts handwriting rather than keyboard entry. Some do have keyboards, but they must be set down to operate and thus suffer the same problem of not being usable and portable at the same time. They can be carried with one hand and used with the other, thus allowing for ambulatory use. They are generally the size of a clipboard or notepad carried by many superintendents and are a good replacement for those devices due to the automation advantages of the computer, but they are still too big to be worn so that the user can move throughout the jobsite easily (up and down ladders) and have hands available for other uses (measuring manipulating objects to demonstrate technique or effect).

=== PDAs ===
The PDA has been accepted by many construction firms to aid the management of punch lists, safety inspections, and maintenance work. They can be thin or thick devices, but are often a combination of the two, having connectivity, but containing programs to operate even when out of range of WiFi or coverage. PDAs are durable, inexpensive, and very portable (being worn on a clip or carried in a pocket). The small screen size and limited ability to quickly enter data are the drawbacks of this device.

=== Smart phones ===
A smart phone is basically a mobile phone and PDA combined into one IA. Other functionalities such as digital camera and voice recorder are common. Data entry, like with the PDA, is by stylus or keypad and cumbersome. Many have web browsing capabilities but the small screen size diminishes the utility of this function to viewing email, weather reports, or some web content. Both PDA and smart phones have calendars, task lists, and phone lists, but they are useful to superintendents when coupled with the phone functions as is the case with the latter. Popular devices include the Blackberry and Treo, the pocket pc, iPhone and Droid all are popular because of their web/email abilities and ease of use.

=== Modern Tablets ===
With the advent of modern tablets including the iPad and Android tablets the area of mobile IT in construction is moving into a new era. These devices overcome many of the limitations of the rugged PDAs in terms of data entry, data access in field and its timely communication to others who need to act on it. In addition they cost a fraction of the cost of the rugged devices or rugged slate PCs.

=== Cameras and peripherals ===
Digital cameras are often included in smart phones and PDAs, but their resolution is lower than the dedicated camera device. Most are not truly IA because they do not readily communicate with other devices or process information. Most brands share information by USB or flash memory card which is removed from the camera and inserted in complementary devices (most PDAs accept these cards). Other methods, such as Infrared Communications or Bluetooth are also available.

=== Software availability ===
A wide variety of software applications for each of the devices listed above are available. The user must determine system requirements and then ensure that software is available to perform the needed functions on a specific device.

== Input/output features of IAs ==
Some IAs (such as the total station) are made specifically for construction use, but they are for very specific applications and will not be considered here as the purpose of this article concerns general construction site management. Traditional input and output methods of keyboard, mouse, and screen are not suitable for the portable IA due to size constraints. These features are very important and must be considered.

=== Input methods ===
Data, queries, commands, or responses must be entered into the computer through some sort of interface. Following are some of the methods useful in portable IAs.

==== Touch screen ====
The touch screen and stylus is effective for construction applications as it allows handwriting recognition for those who do not feel comfortable with keyboards or the small size of keyboards on portable IAs. They are also free hand entry so that the user can sketch and draw notes and measurements directly onto the screen. The digital image of the sketch can be transmitted to others or converted to another format after uploading to a printer or other computer.

==== Key pad ====
These devices are the standard entry method for phones and easy to understand but are a slow means for alphanumeric data entry. They may be suitable for numeric entry into data fields. The user enters numbers on the keypad in response to prompts on the IA screen so this method is only suitable for entry of quantifiable standard information.

==== Voice/speech recognition ====
Voice Recognition is the ability to respond to verbal commands. Speech recognition refers to the capacity of the IA to convert voice entry into data. Both have been difficult to use in many construction applications due to ambient noise, construction jargon which varies by region, trade, and company, and because of speech patterns of the individual user. This method is slower than keyboard entry for the experienced user.

=== Output methods ===
==== Screen ====
The touch screen is the standard display method for tablet PC and smaller IAs. Color may or may not be important to the user but can be an aid in directing the user. The screen size is perhaps the most important consideration. Organization of the screen is challenging on the small screen and the user should be considered when designing the interface. See section 2.2 and 2.3 in Ben Shneiderman's "Designing the user interface" (ISBN 0-321-19786-0) concerning design of the interface.

==== Voice ====
Voice or tonal output from the IA can be effective as a reminder, warning, or indication of action performed, but tends to be irritating to the user if it is the principal method of interaction. Verbal output is slower than viewing the information and it is difficult for a person to pay attention to and understand information. Systems such as JAWS screen reader for the visually impaired do exist, but are not practical for construction site users and application. See Shneiderman section 9.4 (ISBN 0-321-19786-0).

==== Future possibilities ====
Eyetap is a technology being developed that may have construction applications in the future. It allows the user to receive input from the computer superimposed over the scene in view. A diptych screen may be utilized to increase overall screen size and input area. Other 'Star Trek' devices and methods are being developed but the usable products have yet to be 'beamed down' to planet Earth.

== Other considerations ==
=== Usability ===
The section on transparency in this article discusses some requirements for usability. Before implementing a system, a study on how it will add value to the user must be done. Having more data from the field is not directly beneficial to the site superintended. Reducing the time it takes to do 'paperwork' is valued. Sending an image taken from the IA camera directly to an architect for clarification does save time and effort and will be valued by the user.

=== Training ===
The system and device should be designed such that it encourages experimentation and usage. Immediate response to input and adaptability based on level of experience are better than sitting through a training seminar to get a few dry donuts. Training is best accomplished by showing and encouraging use. A 'guru' or user expert within the company may be best way to resolve questions and provide answers to questions and concerns. See 'The social life of information'.

=== Scalability and continual change ===
Technologies will evolve and the user will be facing new challenges with each change. It is usually wiser to adopt a small system that works and then later add features. This gradual adoption reduces anxiety and increases acceptance and use. This work by Linda V. Orr discusses methods to reduce anxiety for new computer users.

=== Integration of systems ===
Consideration should be given to ensure that IA devices and different software packages communicate with each other so that information is not lost or re-entry is not required by the user. Users do not always know or care what software is being used or which database is being accessed and do not understand why they must enter the same information again. For example, once the date has been entered, the user will be frustrated to be prompted to enter it again during the same session. Taking this further, the user may be frustrated to have to enter a date since there is a calendar function on the IA being used.

Web Based Mobile IT

These systems from leading vendors are not simply all about mobility in field and cutting the work required by in field managers in the area of report writing. Cloud based tablet and PC systems provide not just mobile capture and access to data in field but also for the first time they both computerise and move to the cloud the quality function. The use of powerful relational databases at the back end permits the data captured in field to be analysed. This can be used for instance to rate sub-contractors and to feed into continuous quality improvement.

Benefits of Mobile IT in Construction

Studies from the UK organisation COMIT and others have shown there is a valuable ROI from using this technology. Firms have reported faster delivery of projects, project hand over with zero defects, reduced costs from the process of managing sub-contractors and report writing and the value of having a secure audit trail.

== See also ==
- Human-Computer Interaction
- Lean manufacturing - especially waste reduction in management practices.
- Mobile computing
- Object-oriented analysis and design
- Palmtop
- Portable (disambiguation)
- Portable computer
- Wearable computer
