= Star map (disambiguation) =

Star map is another name for a star chart, a map of the night sky.

Star map(s) or starmap(s) may also refer to:

- Maps of celebrity homes, often called star maps
- Star Maps (film), a 1997 American drama
- Star Maps (album), a 1996 album by Possum Dixon
- "Star Maps", a song by Spoons from Static in Transmission, 2011
- "Star Maps", a song by Aly & AJ from Sanctuary, 2019
- Star Map (Star Wars), an object in the video game Star Wars: Knights of the Old Republic
- Star Maps, a mobile app started by Josh Flagg
- Starmaps, the ninth issue of Marvel's Swords of the Swashbucklers

== See also ==
- Starmap Mobile Alliance, a 2004 agreement among some European cell phone providers
- Maps to the stars (disambiguation)
- Star chart (disambiguation)
