= Madritel =

Spanish multi system operator

Madritel Comunicaciones S.A. was a Spanish multi system operator of digital cable television and other services. Triple-play service started on 8 March 1999 with coverage in five districts (Arganzuela, Salamanca, Chamberí, Chamartín and Tetuán) and the adjacent municipalities of Móstoles, Alcobendas, Alcalá de Henares, Alcorcón and Leganés.

In 1999, the company was owned by Telecom Italia and Spanish electricity companies Endesa and Union Fenosa. A fiber network worth 1 billion pesetas started construction in 2001. The company was facing internal problems in December 2001, with the firing of its director general.

In 2002, it was merged into AunaCable. The name Madritel was still in use as a subsidiary.
