= Bridge Alliance =

Alliance of mobile telecommunications companies

- Trade name: Bridge Mobile Pte. Ltd.
- Type: Private
- Industry: Telecommunications
- Founded: 2004; 22 years ago
- Headquarters: Singapore
- Products: M2M/IoT, Enterprise mobility, Roaming
- Members: 34
- Website: www.bridgealliance.com

The Bridge Alliance (originally the Bridge Mobile Alliance) is a business alliance of 34 major mobile telecommunications companies in Asia, Australia, Africa and the Middle East. It uses connectivity and a suite of integrated value-added services, including IoT/M2M, Optimization and Enterprise Mobility, for all alliance members' subscribers while roaming on each other's networks. The concept is similar to that of the FreeMove alliance in Europe, with whom the Bridge Alliance has a partnership.

== History ==
Established on 3 November 2004, the alliance originally comprised Singapore Telecommunications (SingTel), Bharti Airtel, Globe Telecom, Optus, Telkomsel, Maxis Communications, and Taiwan Mobile, enabling it to gain a foothold in the mobile markets of Singapore, India, the Philippines, Australia, Indonesia, Malaysia and Taiwan.

The alliance expanded between 2005 and 2015 to also include Hong Kong CSL in Hong Kong, CTM in Macau, SK Telecom in South Korea, Advanced Info Service (AIS) in Thailand, MobiFone in Vietnam, Metfone in Cambodia, Telkomcel in Timor-Leste, Airtel in Sri Lanka, the African operators of Bharti Airtel (in Chad, Democratic Republic of the Congo, Republic of the Congo, Gabon, Ghana, Kenya, Malawi, Madagascar, Niger, Nigeria, Rwanda, Seychelles, Tanzania, Uganda and Zambia), SoftBank Mobile in Japan, and Saudi Telecom Company in Saudi Arabia, Bahrain and Kuwait.

Recently, the Bridge Alliance members number close to 900 million subscribers in more than 100 markets. Bridge Alliance partners include AT&T, China Unicom, FreeMove and the Global M2M Association.

== Timeline ==
In 2004, seven large Asia Pacific mobile operators formed region's largest joint venture mobile company. In 2005, Bridge and SingTel launched their first regional mobile gaming competition. Also, CSL joined Bridge Alliance. In 2006, Bridge Alliance added CTM as an operator member.

Bridge Alliance in 2007 launched capped plans with one-flat data roaming rate across 11 territories. FreeMove and Bridge Alliance established a partnership that year and two new were members added – SK telecom and AIS.

Bridge Alliance launched one-flat rate, daily unlimited data roaming plan across all Bridge Alliance member countries in 2010. AIS and Globe offered Bridge VoiceSMS Roam, one-rate voice and SMS roaming price plans, across APAC in 2011. And in 2011, Bridge AsiaRoamData SIM service had an expanded coverage to 11 countries.

In 2012, Bridge Alliance expanded into Vietnam and accepted MobiFone as its 12th member, and Bridge Alliance and Softbank Mobile formed a business partnership to expand enterprise offerings. In 2013, Airtel Africa joined Bridge Alliance, as did Airtel Bangladesh and Telkomce, which became its 13th member. In 2014, Saudi Telecom Company joined Bridge Alliance, and SoftBank Mobile joined Bridge Alliance. In 2016, Bridge Alliance and the Global M2M Association collaborated to drive worldwide growth in M2M and Internet of Things markets. In 2017, Bridge Alliance and FreeMove expanded a partnership to offer integrated Enterprise Mobility in 106 markets. Bridge Alliance, China Unicom and Singtel Strengthen Interconnected Platform Capabilities with eSIM Swap Collaboration in 2020. Also that year, Bridge Alliance's Global MEC task force gathered in South Korea for first 5G MEC summit.

== See also ==
- FreeMove
- Starmap Mobile Alliance
