= Richard J. Callahan =

Technology Entrepreneur

- Callahan in 2015
- Born: December 4, 1941; Sioux Falls, South Dakota, US
- Died: October 19, 2024 (aged 82); Denver, Colorado, US
- Occupation: Businessman
- Known for: US West International / MediaOne, Inc.
- Awards: University of Nebraska - Lifetime Achievement

Richard J. Callahan (December 4, 1941 - October 19, 2024 was an American communications industry businessman. He is best known for his role as the head of US West International, and for starting or leading cable and wireless projects in 18 different countries.

Callahan has been a recipient of various awards from organizations such as the University of Nebraska College of Business Administration Lifetime Achievement award (2015) and the Arthur Andersen Lifetime Achievement in Communications award (2001).

== Early life and education ==
Callahan was born in Sioux Falls, South Dakota. He graduated with a Bachelor of Science degree from the University of Nebraska in 1964, where he was a scholastic-American football player. He later obtained an MBA degree from Creighton University in 1972.

== Career ==
Callahan's career began as a telephone lineworker before rising up through the ranks in telephone companies where he held positions in operations, marketing, commercial, and regulatory affairs. He held several senior management positions including president of US West's International division, where he oversaw dozens of companies providing services in 18 different countries. He managed this division from a London office.

After leaving US West in 1996, he launched his own holding company, Callahan Associates International LLC (CAI), which acquired various cable and wireless operators internationally. With financial backing from GE Capital, Bank of America, and Caisse de dépôt et placement du Québec, CAI acquired a 55% share of Deutsche Telekom's "ish" brand cable operations in North Rhine-Westphalia, shortly after picking up ONO, a Spanish cable TV operator. Callahan's team also purchased Telenet, Belgium's largest cable provider and a system that Callahan had developed while at US West, valued at $969 million at the time.
