= Starmap Mobile Alliance =

Former organization

The countries of the Starmap Mobile Alliance, as of 2007

Starmap Mobile Alliance was a preferential service agreement signed in February 2004 by a group of European GSM cell phone providers to provide their customers with easier and more economical roaming services and to create synergies when buying equipment.

The main advantages for Starmap customers are no-prefix dialing when abroad (CAMEL roaming), topping-up by vouchers and the availability of MMS picture messaging services and GPRS data access even when roaming.

The original members were (February 2004):

- Amena, Spain (left after acquisition by Orange)
- Telefónica Europe, United Kingdom, Ireland, Germany
- Orange, Austria (formerly known as One)
- Pannon GSM, Hungary
- sunrise, Switzerland
- Telenor, Norway
- Wind, Italy

In March 2004, Sonofon of Denmark and in September 2004 O_{2} of Czech Republic (formerly known as Eurotel) joined the alliance.

The Starmap Mobile Alliance was the original Idea of the strategy international advisor Arie Guez, president of Fantine Group. The alliance faded after 2009.

== See also ==
- Bridge Alliance
- FreeMove
