= FreeMove =

Mobile telecommunications provider alliance

- Type: Private
- Industry: Telecommunication
- Founded: December 2003; 22 years ago
- Headquarters: Amsterdam, Netherlands
- Key people: Lazaro Fernandez (General Manager)
- Members: Orange; Deutsche Telekom; TIM; Telia Company

The FreeMove alliance is a business alliance of mobile telecommunications companies based in Europe.

== History ==
The FreeMove alliance was established in 2003, combining the national network capabilities of four of Europe's largest national mobile operators: Deutsche Telecom, France Télécom (now Orange S.A.), Telefónica and Telecom Italia (TIM) for multinational customers.

=== Timeline ===
July 2023: Selma Avdagic Tisljar was named General Manager, replacing Lazaro Fernandez, who served in the role since 2018.

January 2020: Swisscom joined FreeMove in January 2020.

2018: Lazaro Fernandez was named General Manager, replacing Stephan Fauser.

November 2017: BT joined FreeMove in November 2017.

September 2013 : Eir, the main Irish operator, joins FreeMove.

August 2011: FreeMove expands its presence into South East Europe with mobile telecommunications services providers Cosmote (Greece)

February 2011: FreeMove signs a partnership with leading Russian operator MegaFon.

November 2010: A key strategic partnership with T-Mobile US is announced to better support multinational corporations operating on both sides of the Atlantic.

October 2010: FreeMove and Turkcell announce their partnership.

March 2007: FreeMove and Bridge Alliance announce that the two organisations have signed a Memorandum of Understanding to pave the way for establishing an tight cooperation across their combined global footprint.

September 2006: Spanish operator Amena, part of the France Télécom group, joins FreeMove.

March 2006: TeliaSonera, the leading Nordic and Baltic operator, joins FreeMove.

January 2006: Telefónica leaves FreeMove as a condition of the acquisition of O2.

December 2003: FreeMove is formed with four leading European operators. Orange, Deutsche Telekom, Telecom Italia and Telefónica,

== Membership ==
As of July 2020, FreeMove has four active members and one former member. Founding member Telefónica was required to end membership of FreeMove in order to acquire O2, with the European Commission citing competition concerns. The Commission were concerned non-FreeMove members would have to pay significantly more for roaming services in the UK, as three out of the four largest mobile network operators would have been members of the FreeMove alliance. As of 2023, FreeMove served a collective base of 400 million customers across more than 100 countries.

Member network	Joined	Exited
(France) Orange	December 2003	—N/a
(Germany) Deutsche Telekom	December 2003	—N/a
(Italy) TIM	December 2003	—N/a
(Sweden) Telia Company	16 March 2006	—N/a
(Spain) Telefónica	December 2003	January 2006

=== Partnerships ===
FreeMove has partnerships with several mobile telecommunication operators and alliances which provide services in territories not serviced by members. Partners have access to the FreeMove networks and FreeMove has access to the partner's network.

Partner network	Partner since
(United Kingdom) BT	27 November 2017
(Switzerland) Swisscom	23 January 2020
(Singapore) Bridge Alliance	March 2007
(Russia) MegaFon (suspended since 2022)	14 February 2011
(United States) T-Mobile US	11 November 2010
(Turkey) Turkcell	19 October 2010
(Republic of Ireland) eir	11 September 2013
(Portugal) NOS	December 2003

BT

BT joined FreeMove in November 2017. BT is one of the world’s leading communications services companies. BT serves the needs of customers in the UK and in 180 countries worldwide. Their main activities are the provision of fixed-line services, broadband, mobile and TV products and services as well as networked IT services.

Bridge Alliance

FreeMove has been co-operating with the Bridge Alliance since 2007. This partnership was extended in June 2017. Bridge covers over 800 million customers across 38 markets, ensuring that frequent travelers can use a suite of value-added services for roaming amongst member countries.

Swisscom

Swisscom joined FreeMove in January 2020. Swisscom, Switzerland’s leading telecoms company and one of its leading IT companies, is headquartered in Ittigen, close to the capital city Berne. To the end of the 3rd Quarter 2019 19,500 employees generated sales of CHF 8,456 million. It is 51% Confederation-owned and is one of Switzerland’s most sustainable and innovative companies.

MegaFon

FreeMove signed a partnership with leading Russian operator MegaFon in February 2011 to include the Russian market.

With a subscriber base of 57 million, MegaFon is the second largest operator in Russia’s growing telecoms market, both in terms of subscriber numbers and revenue share.

T-Mobile US

A partnership with T-Mobile US was announced in November 10, 2010. This partnership was renewed and expanded in Dec. 2017.

T-Mobile US has 72 million customers as at Q1 2017, providing mobile voice and data services and serving as the host network for many mobile virtual network operators.

Turkcell

The partnership between FreeMove and Turkcell was announced in October 2010. The company has 62 million subscribers in Turkey.

NOS

NOS Comunicações, S.A., previously known as Optimus, is the biggest communication and entertainment group in Portugal. It has formed part of the FreeMove ecosystem for a long time as Optimus was previously partly owned by the Orange Group.

eir

Eir is the principal provider of fixed-line and mobile telecommunications services in Ireland with approximately 2 million customers. FreeMove has partnered with eircom since June 2013.

== See also ==
- Starmap Mobile Alliance
- Bridge Alliance
