= AunaCable =

Former cable television, telephone and Internet product in Spain

- Headquarters: Spain

AunaCable was a cable television, telephone and Internet product in 2002 from the merger of several regional Spanish carriers, including Madritel, Catalan Menta, the Andalusian Supercable, the Aragonese Aragón de Cable and Canarias Telecom.

During the time it operated, each region retained the name of the regional operations that preceded it, such as AunaCable Madritel in Madrid, AunaCable Menta in Catalonia, etc. AunaCable was absorbed by the telephone operator Retevision when it established a new operator Auna.

Auna was finally bought and absorbed in 2005 by ONO, and both its services and its customers were unified under that brand.

In 2014, the operator Vodafone purchased ONO, thus being able to offer cable where fiber optic service is not available.
