= Maps to the stars =

Maps to the stars may refer to:

- Maps of celebrity homes, also called maps to the stars
- Maps to the Stars, a 2014 satirical drama film by David Cronenberg

== See also ==
- Star map (disambiguation)
