= Star chart (disambiguation) =

A star chart is a map of the night sky.

Star chart or starchart may also refer to:

- A Star plot, also known as a radar chart or cobweb chart, a graphical method of displaying multivariate data
- Star Chart (TV series), a 1980 Canadian music show
- Star Chart, a television program broadcast by MTV Ukraine
- "Star Chart", a 2014 episode of the Japanese TV series Garo: Makai no Hana
- A star chart is another name for a chore chart
- "Star Chart", a theme song for the anime of The Devil Is a Part-Timer!
- Star Charts, a 2014 album by the musician Pogo
- "Star Charts", a 1998 exhibit by American painter Margaret Rinkovsky
- Star Charts, a supplement to the role-playing game FTL:2448
- StarChart, a component of the software StarOffice
- StarChart, healthcare software developed by Informatics Corporation of America

== See also ==
- Star map (disambiguation)
- Star catalogue
