= Telkomcel =

Timor Leste telecommunications company

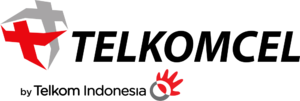
- Type: Subsidiary
- Industry: Telecommunications
- Founded: 17 September 2012; 13 years ago
- Headquarters: Dili, Timor-Leste
- Key people: Dedi Suherman, CEO; Ambar Kuspardianto, CTO; Djanis Hernadi, CFO; Erfizal Fikri Yusmansyah, CMO
- Products: Prepaid; postpaid; mobile phone; Mobile broadband
- Parent: Telin (Telkom Indonesia)
- Website: telkomcel.tl

Telkomcel is a mobile telecommunication service located in Timor-Leste, owned by Telekomunikasi Indonesia International (TL) S.A. The company was established on 17 September 2012. It has three main business areas: mobile services, corporate solution and wholesale and international services.

On 24 June 2013, Telkomcel joined the Bridge Alliance, an Asian-Australian-African alliance of mobile operators.

== Network Service ==
Telkomcel data network supported by 3G High Speed Download Packet Access (HSDPA) technology which is capable of transmitting data at up to 14.4 Mbit/s. Previous technology such as GPRS and EDGE are also available. In delivering 3G technology, Telkomcel using 850 MHz frequency. The advantage of this frequency is it ability to serve larger coverage, up to three times the coverage of 2.1 GHz frequency. Starting in February 2018, Telkomcel has provided 4G LTE network starting from Dili area, and continuing to expand to other districts.

== See also ==
- Telecommunications in Timor-Leste
