= Tenaria =

Spanish cable service

Tenaria was a Spanish cable service born in 2000 from the merger of two regional cable companies: Retena of Navarre and Reterioja of La Rioja. The individual names were still in use for the cable companies in their respective autonomous communities.

Its shareholders suspended a merger agreement with Ono in 2001. In 2003 it installed internet connections for the Public University of Navarre. It received support from the government of Navarre in 2004 to install a node for the cable network in Marcilla, for a period of five years.
