= Vodafone España =

Spanish telecommunications company

Vodafone España, S.A.U.

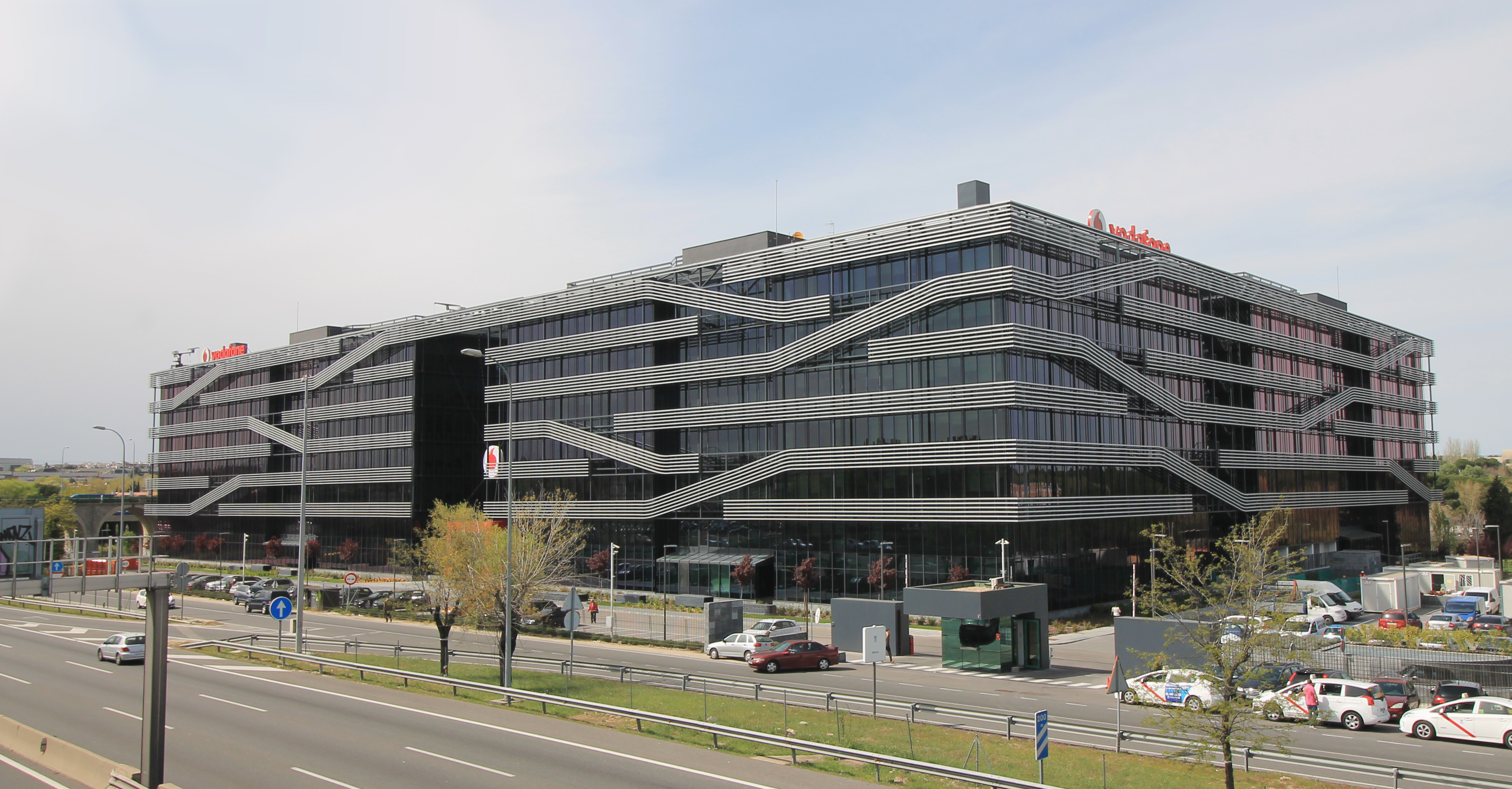
- Vodafone España head offices in Madrid
- Formerly: Airtel Movil (1994–2001)
- Company type: Private
- Industry: Telecommunications
- Founded: 27 May 1994; 32 years ago
- Headquarters: Madrid, Spain
- Area served: Spain
- Key people: Eamonn O'Hare (Chairman); José Miguel García (CEO)
- Products: Fixed-line telephony; Mobile telephony; Broadband internet; Digital television
- Revenue: ▼€3,629 billion (2024)
- Operating income: ▼€−1,249 billion (2025)
- Net income: ▼€−307 million (2024)
- Total assets: ▼€8,487 billion (2024)
- Total equity: ▼€1,945 billion (2024)
- Owner: Zegona Communications
- Number of employees: 4,024 (2025)
- Website: www.vodafone.es

Vodafone España, S.A.U. (formerly Airtel Movil S.A.) is a telecommunications company in Spain headquartered in Madrid. Since May 2024, it has been a wholly owned subsidiary of the British investment firm Zegona Communications, which acquired the company from Vodafone Group for €5 billion. Under a ten-year licensing agreement, the company continues to operate under the Vodafone brand.

The company was founded in 1994 as Airtel by a consortium comprising Airtouch, British Telecom (BT), and several Spanish partners including Banco Santander, Central Hispano, and Acciona. In 2001, Vodafone Group achieved full control by buying out BT and the Spanish shareholders, leading to a comprehensive rebranding as Vodafone.

During its tenure under Vodafone Group, the company significantly expanded its infrastructure through two landmark acquisitions, starting with the Spanish operations of Tele2 in 2007 to enter the fixed-line market, followed by the purchase of major cable provider Ono in 2014 for €7.2 billion. This second transaction provided the company with an extensive fiber-optic network and a digital television platform, establishing it as a major operator providing mobile telephony, broadband internet, and pay television services.

== History ==
=== Airtel era (1994–2001) ===
The company was founded in 1994 as Airtel de Comunicaciones, S.A., after a consortium won Spain's second mobile license. The original shareholders included Airtouch, British Telecom (BT), and several Spanish institutions such as Banco Santander, Central Hispano, and Acciona. Airtel began commercial operations in 1995 with an initial investment of 150 billion pesetas.

Under the executive leadership of Ignacio Galán and the chairmanship of Eduardo Serra Rexach, Airtel experienced rapid growth, expanding its subscriber base from 600,000 in 1996 to 7 million by 2001. Between 2000 and 2001, Vodafone Group consolidated its control over the operator by acquiring BT's 17.8% stake and buying out the remaining Spanish shareholders. The company was valued at approximately €24 billion at the time of the final buyout.

In June 2001, the European Commission authorized the full acquisition of Airtel by Vodafone. Following the takeover, John de Wit was appointed CEO in August 2001, and by October, the company officially rebranded as Vodafone España. During this transition, the operator became the first in Spain to launch GPRS services with international roaming, establishing its position as a technological pioneer in the market.

=== Integration into Vodafone Group (2001–2007) ===
Following its rebranding, Vodafone España focused on infrastructure expansion and technological leadership. In 2002, the company reached an agreement with Metro de Madrid to provide mobile coverage across the city's underground network. By the end of 2004, the operator's customer base had grown to 10.9 million users, a 12.6% increase over the previous year.

Under the leadership of Francisco Román, who was appointed CEO in 2003, the company pioneered the transition to 3G (UMTS) services in Spain. It was the first to market high-speed mobile data cards for personal computers and, in 2005, launched the country's first 3G flat-rate mobile internet plans. In 2006, Vodafone further advanced mobile connectivity by deploying HSDPA (3.5G) technology in major Spanish cities, offering speeds up to 1.6 Mbps.

During this period, the company also diversified its digital services. In 2006, it launched Vodafone live! TV, the first mobile television platform in Spain to offer digital channels such as CNN, Fox, MTV, HBO, and Eurosport. By the end of the 2006 fiscal year, the company's annual revenue reached €5.8 billion, representing a 22.5% year-on-year increase.

In December 2006, the company partnered with Sogecable to launch Digital+ Móvil, the first mobile pay-TV platform in Spain to offer digital channels over 3G networks. To improve rural connectivity, the operator signed a landmark 3G infrastructure-sharing agreement with Orange in late 2006, covering 19 provinces.

=== Convergence and acquisitions (2007–2019) ===
On 6 October 2007, Vodafone reached an agreement to acquire the Spanish and Italian subsidiaries of Tele2 for €775 million. By 2008, the integration of Tele2 allowed the company to launch its first ADSL services and integrated office solutions.

Under the leadership of Francisco Román, who assumed the presidency of Vodafone España in 2008, the company reached 15 million customers and achieved a 30% penetration rate for 3G devices. A major strategic shift occurred in 2009 when the company launched its nationwide Vodafone ADSL service, breaking traditional market dynamics by offering uniform conditions across Spain. This era also saw the deployment of HSPA+ technology in major Spanish cities and the introduction of Vodafone 360, a suite of integrated internet services.

By the end of 2009, the operator's customer base reached 16.9 million users. During this period, the company also focused on social responsibility, becoming the first Spanish telecommunications firm to implement a comprehensive gender equality plan in 2009,and receiving the AENOR Universal Accessibility certification for its retail network in 2010.

In 2011, Francisco Román was appointed Executive Chairman, and later in 2012, António Coimbra became the CEO of Vodafone España. This period was marked by significant network improvements, including the use of the 900MHz band to enhance indoor 3G coverage and the activation of the WACS submarine cable to connect the Canary Islands with the mainland. In late 2012, the company launched Vodafone yu, a specialized sub-brand targeting the youth market.

On 27 May 2013, Vodafone España became one of the first operators to launch 4G (LTE) services in Spain, initially covering seven major cities. By 2014, the company had upgraded its network to 4G+ (LTE Advanced), offering download speeds of up to 300 Mbps in Madrid, Barcelona, and Valencia. To strengthen its position in the fixed-line market, Vodafone signed a fiber-optic deployment agreement with Orange in 2013 to expand its FTTH footprint nationwide.

During this era, the company engaged in high-profile branding initiatives, most notably a three-year sponsorship deal with Metro de Madrid in 2013, which saw the iconic Puerta del Sol station and Line 2 rebranded as "Vodafone Sol" and "Línea 2 Vodafone."

A landmark expansion occurred on 17 March 2014, when Vodafone acquired the cable operator Ono for €7.2 billion. This acquisition granted Vodafone an extensive hybrid fiber-coaxial (HFC) network, enabling the commercialization of high-speed broadband and advanced television services across major cities including Madrid, Barcelona, and Valencia.

During this period, Vodafone España focused on becoming a major digital entertainment provider. In 2016, the company became the exclusive partner for the launch of HBO in Spain and introduced the market's first 4K set-top box. By 2017, the operator's TV subscriber base exceeded one million, bolstered by the "Vodafone One" convergent offering. The company also ventured into eSports, launching the "G2 | Vodafone" team and specialized television programming.

Technological milestones included the world's first commercial NB-IoT call in Madrid in 2016 and the 2017 launch of 4.5G services with speeds up to 700 Mbps using Massive MIMO technology. Additionally, Vodafone became the first operator in Spain to offer 1 Gbps fiber broadband.

=== 5G rollout and market challenges (2019–2023) ===
In January 2019, it reported, through a statement to the workers' representatives, the opening of a collective dismissal procedure "for economic, productive and organizational reasons" that would affect a maximum of 1,200 employees, on 23, 5% of the workforce.

In May 2019, Vodafone España announced it would be the first operator to launch commercial 5G services in Spain, covering cities such as Madrid, Barcelona, Bilbao, Malaga, Seville and Valencia.

In October 2022, Vodafone España simplified its corporate structure by integrating its low-cost subsidiary, Lowi (Vodafone Enabler España, S.L.), directly into the parent company. As a result, Lowi ceased to exist as a separate legal entity and became a commercial brand under the same legal name as Vodafone España, S.A.U. On 1 October 2023, Mário Vaz was appointed as the company's executive chairman.

=== Zegona ownership (2024–present) ===
In October 2023, the British investment firm Zegona Communications announced a total acquisition of Vodafone España for €5 billion, marking Vodafone Group's exit from the Spanish market after 23 years. The transaction was finalized on 31 May 2024, with the company maintaining the Vodafone brand under a long-term license agreement.

Following the takeover, Zegona initiated a major cost-reduction plan, which included a new collective dismissal procedure (ERE) announced in June 2024. After negotiations with labor unions, the parties agreed on the dismissal of 898 employees, representing approximately 28% of the workforce. The plan was completed in July 2024, with 667 voluntary departures and 231 forced layoffs.

In early 2025, Vodafone España faced a legal and financial dispute with its wholesale partner Finetwork over significant unpaid network access fees. On 24 May 2025, Finetwork filed for pre-bankruptcy protection to shield itself from Vodafone's legal claims. Following legal proceedings, Vodafone presented a restructuring plan to convert €50 million of Finetwork's debt into equity. The plan was approved by the Commercial Court of Alicante on 5 September 2025, effectively granting Vodafone control over the company. The transaction received authorization from the Spanish Government on 30 September and the National Markets and Competition Commission (CNMC) on 6 November 2024. On 13 November 2025, Vodafone España finalized the acquisition, taking a 99.4% stake in Finetwork through debt capitalization and an additional €10 million capital increase to ensure the operator's liquidity.

In tandem with its corporate restructuring, Zegona launched a complete transition from Vodafone's legacy Ono-era hybrid fiber-coaxial (HFC) network to an exclusive fiber-to-the-home (FTTH) architecture. To execute this national modernization, the company established two major network joint ventures (FibreCos). Operations for FiberPass, a joint venture with Telefónica (owner of Movistar) covering approximately 3.5 million premises, began in March 2025. In December 2025, Vodafone finalized the launch of PremiumFiber alongside MasOrange (owner of Orange Spain) and global investor GIC. This venture merged network assets to establish a national FTTH footprint reaching over 12 million premises, facilitating the ongoing physical phase-out of Vodafone's legacy coaxial lines.

== Controversies ==
=== Customer complaints ===
According to industry reports, Vodafone España has frequently been cited as having one of the highest numbers of customer complaints per user among major Spanish telecommunications operators, particularly regarding billing issues and customer service quality.

=== Wikipedia "Bobaró" hoax (2009) ===
In December 2009, Vodafone España was involved in a controversy regarding a viral marketing campaign for Christmas. As part of the promotion, the company created a fake Wikipedia article about "Bobaró," a fictional traditional Philippine festival that did not exist. The hoax was intended to provide a backstory for their advertisement but was discovered and deleted by Wikipedia editors within 17 days. The incident was widely criticized by the online community as a violation of Wikipedia's editorial policies and an act of corporate vandalism.
