= .tl =

Internet country code top-level domain for Timor-Leste

- Introduced: 23 March 2005
- TLD type: Country code top-level domain
- Status: Active
- Registry: Timor-Leste NIC
- Sponsor: Autoridade Nacional de Comunicações (Timor-Leste)
- Intended use: Entities connected with Timor-Leste
- Actual use: Used in Timor-Leste, occasionally used for domain hacks.
- Registration restrictions: May not be used for any purpose that is obscene, indecent, or spam-related
- Structure: Registrations are accepted directly at second level, with some sites (especially governmental) at third level
- Documents: Registration agreement; Acceptable use policy; Privacy policy
- Registry website: Timor-Leste NIC

.tl is the current country code top-level domain (ccTLD) for Timor-Leste. It is administered through the Council of Country Code Administrators (CoCCA) and second-level registration is available through resellers worldwide with no local presence requirement.

.tl complies with the ISO 3166-1 standard for the two-letter codes of the name of countries and can be used as an abbreviation in either of the country's two official languages: Timor Lorosa'e in Tetum or Timor-Leste in Portuguese.

Registration is normally directly at second-level; one subdomain in use in the country itself is gov.tl, for government ministries. For example, the Government Portal is www.timor-leste.gov.tl.

The previous ccTLD for Timor-Leste was .tp. This ccTLD was, according to IANA, assigned in May 1997. According to the registry, all registrants in .tp were automatically given the equivalent domains in .tl, and no further .tp registrations were accepted until its removal from the root zone in February 2015.

For several years, the .tl WHOIS information at IANA showed no sponsoring organization or registry, and the domain did not appear to work even though the country involved claimed to be transitioning to it. However, as of 30 September 2005, there is contact information in the IANA WHOIS and a registry site at nic.tl, although the site has been inactive since 2021. A WHOIS service remains accessible.

The majority of current .tl registrations are domain hacks directly at the second-level by various international entities, often with no direct connection with Timor Leste.
