= Play More =

- Country: Belgium
- Broadcast area: Belgium
- Headquarters: Mechelen

Programming
- Language(s): Dutch
- Picture format: 576i (PAL) 16:9 (2005-2015); 1080i (HDTV)

Ownership
- Owner: Telenet (Liberty Global)
- Sister channels: Play Sports

History
- Launched: September 3, 2005
- Replaced: FilmNet (1985-1997); Canal+ (1997-2005); PRIME (2005-2016)

Links
- Website: prime.be

Availability

Streaming media
- Yelo Play: Watch Live (Belgium only)

Play More is a Belgian premium television service owned by Telenet, the Belgian division of Liberty Global. Prime launched together with its sister service Prime Sport (later Sporting Telenet and now Play Sports) on September 3, 2005 and replaced the Canal+ Flanders television channels. The service offers multiple film channels with Belgian and international productions many of which are television premières.

The service launched with five channels and a timeshift version of the main channel. Starting March 2015, all channels are broadcast exclusively in HD, the timeshift version PRIME Star +1 has thus been closed down. The channels are only available on Telenet and its Yelo Play service with the Play More package.

On 13 December 2016, Prime was rebranded as Play More, with a SVOD service and the new channel Play More Black.

On 1 January 2019, Play More Cinema merged with Play More Series, and Play More Relax merged with Play More Select.

On 1 June 2020, Play More Relax / Select will be closed, merged in Play More Kicks.

On January 28, 2021, all three channels rebranded under the Play name. Alongside the rebrand, the channel also unveiled a new on-air imaging.

== Channels ==
- Play More Cinema: a TV premiere every day at 9 p.m. and a blockbuster every Saturday and a children's film every Wednesday afternoon. This channel used to be called PRIME Star, but there was also a version with the same programming until 27 March 2015 that broadcast an hour later under the name PRIME Star +1. Merged with Play More Series (formerly PRIME Series) since 1 January 2019.
- Play More Kicks: suspense, action, horror, fantasy. This channel used to call PRIME Action. Merged with Play More Relax / Select (formerly PRIME Family) since 1 June 2020.
- Play More Black: Broadcasts daily from 7 p.m. Consists of horror films and a hint of eroticism in the late hours. New channel since December 13, 2016. Since January 1, 2019 it is already broadcasting at 19 instead of 9 p.m.

== See also ==
- Play Sports
- Television in Belgium
- BeTV, its French-language equivalent owned by its competitor VOO
