= Play (Belgian TV channel) =

Belgian-Flemish commercial television channel

- Country: Belgium

Programming
- Language: Dutch
- Picture format: 1080i HDTV

Ownership
- Owner: Play Media
- Sister channels: Play Fictie, Play Actie, Play Reality, Play Crime

History
- Launched: 1 February 1995; 31 years ago
- Former names: VT4 (1995–2012); VIER (2012–2021); Play4 (2021–2025)

Links
- Website: play.tv

Availability

Streaming media
- Yelo TV: Watch Live (HD)
- TV Overal: Watch Live (HD)

Play is a Belgian-Flemish commercial television channel. It is part of Play Media and production company Woestijnvis.

As of 2010, the channel has a market share of more than 7%.

The channel was formerly known as VIER from 17 September 2012 to 27 January 2021. On 28 January 2021, the channel was rebranded to Play4. On 13 October 2025, the channel was rebranded to Play.

Its owner also operates sister stations Play Fictie, Play Actie and Play Reality. The channel broadcasts entertainment shows, series, cartoons, movies, and sports.

== History ==
=== Early years ===
The channel began broadcasting on 1 February 1995 under the name VT4 (the VT initials stood for "Viking Television"). The channel initially had no Belgian broadcasting license and was transmitted via London (actually from NTL's transmission station at Brookmans Park in Hertfordshire). There was initially mass refusal from the Flemish authorities, considering that VTM gained an 18-year monopoly for advertising. In reaction, Minister of Culture Hugo Weckx initially banned the broadcast of VT4 on Belgian cable in January 1995, under the grounds that, although the channel was licensed in Europe, it should be under the protection of the Flemish legislation. In the same month, the European Commission filed suit against the Belgian government, by dishonoring the cross-border directive imposed by the Directive. The issue over whether or not cable operators should add VT4 led to numerous other lawsuits, among them one by Turner regarding the carriage of Cartoon Network/TNT and CNN.

VT4, however, was allowed to broadcast after the European Commission responded to VT4's complaint in June 1995. That month, the European Commission warned Belgium that it had to dismantle VTM's commercial monopoly in two months, or face legal action.

The channel launched one day after Ka2. Both channels competed against each other since the beginning and were initially catered to "unserved audiences". But like Ka2, the initial format failed as the Flemish market was not ready for non-mainstream networks, causing the channels to switch to primarily American imports on the cheap. In the summer of 1995, coinciding with the change, the channel hired John McCready (formerly of Television New Zealand) who achieved success in six months. Successes included The Jerry Springer Show (which in the summer of 1998 attracted VT4's largest audience share to date at the time) and erotic programming. During a three-day period comprising 9 to 11 May 1997, the channel aired the world's longest commercial, for Spaas candles, for a period of seven hours and twenty-two minutes, in the channel's overnight downtime period.

Dirk Verhofstadt left VT4 in June 2001.

=== As a full-on local channel ===
Since 2004, VT4 broadcasts legally from Zaventem in Belgium. The new facilities enabled playout facilities for more than one channel, which was at the pipeline for SBS. It is available on the cable network in Brussels as well as in Flanders. It's also available throughout Belgium on the IPTV network of Belgacom, who offers triple play everywhere in Belgium where VDSL is available. It carried the 2006 FIFA World Cup, which was complemented by sister channel VIJFtv's female-centric output for the period.

The channel broadcast a one-off dubbed episode of The Simpsons (the series was regularly broadcast in English with Dutch subtitles), Sex, Pies and Idiot Scrapes, the first episode of the twentieth season, under the title De Vlaamse Simpsons (The Flemish Simpsons) as part of the 20th anniversary of the series, on 24 October 2009. For the dub, the same voice actors from the movie reprised their roles.

=== Woestijnvis joins; becoming Vier ===
In January 2011, two companies, De Vijver Media, parent holding of Flemish television production company Woestijnvis, and RTL Group, announced their intentions to acquire SBS Belgium, including VT4. Specialists believed that the group's two channels were worth €100-150 million. The move came when ProSiebenSat.1 Media, which acquired SBS Broadcasting's assets, decided to sell its TV and radio networks in Scandinavia, the Netherlands and Flanders.

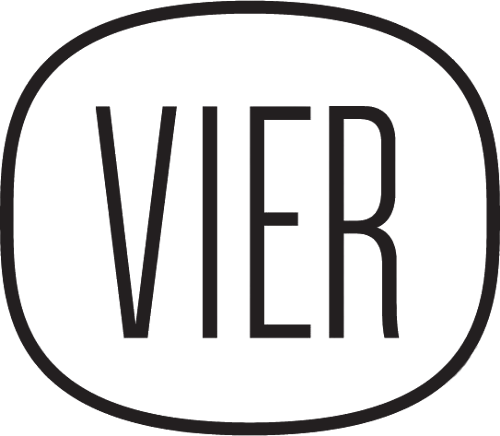
2012–2017 logo

On 14 June 2012, it was announced that VT4 would be rebranded as Vier effective 17 September. Vier's ratings and advertising revenue were higher than those of VT4 at the end of 2012. Vier and Woestijnvis boss Wouter Vandenhaute had higher expectations, by trying to have at least 40% of the ad market. The channel suspended Man Bijt Hond (later becoming a weekly programme) and moved De Kruitfabriek to prime time, causing dissatisfaction from viewers. The programming measures didn't help, and by May 2013, its ratings fell by 25%.

In 2014, the ratings slightly increased again. The channel had a 7% penetration in the "Verantwoordelijken Voor Aankoop" (Responsible for Buying) target group ages 18 to 54.

In its first months, VIER tried to make its advertising breaks more appealing to viewers, including short games, excerpts from editorial programmes and animation films. According to a 19 November 2012 ruling from the Flemish Regulator for the Media, these excerpts violated advertising regulations, as advertising must be clearly separated from programming. VIER scrapped these segments after that.

=== Telenet becomes a shareholder ===
On 13 June 2014, Telenet became one of De Vijver Media's three shareholders. It acquired Sanoma's assets, but had to exclude Humo from the agreement.

VIER had a 12,8% share in 2016 among the 18-54 "Responsible for Buying" demographic, reaching its highest share ever.

On 7 June 2019, it was announced that the channel would be eventually rebranded as "Four" as part of the rebranding of the three channels under the "Play" name. The following year, it was decided that the channel would instead rebrand as Play4 on 28 January 2021.

=== Ditching the 4 ===
On 13 October 2025, Play Media announced that Play4 was rebranded as Play as part of the company wide rebranding campaign, alongside their streaming platform GoPlay rebranded as the same name. This caused the main channel of the group to ditch the numeral 4 after thirty years. Its sister channels also dropped their numbers and adopted names matching their themes. Jeroen Bronselaer justified that the rebranding operation was a difficult decision, as there were plans to either ditch the Play or ditch the 4 altogether. The removal of the number-based names stems from the fact that fixed days for television viewing are now in the past, and the company is eyeing towards a streaming-first strategy, by adopting a new name that can be recognisable on any platform. Stef Verbeeck also stated that there are still people calling it VT4, under the grounds that "the more iconic a brand, the more difficult such a name change is", citing the rename from Sportpaleis to the AFAS Dome as an example.

== HD broadcast ==
VT4 HD was launched as a temporary high-definition channel on June 7, 2008, to coincide with the kick-off of UEFA Euro 2008. It was merely a simulcast of VT4's schedule, but the Euro 2008 matches and all related talk shows were broadcast in HD. VT4 HD was available exclusively to Telenet Digital TV subscribers and was shut down on June 29, 2008.

On September 1, 2012, VT4 HD, along with sister channel VijfTV HD, launched as a HD simulcast. The channel was made available to Belgacom TV subscribers. On September 17, the day of the relaunch, both VIER HD and VIJF HD were made available for Telenet Digital TV subscribers.

== Video on demand ==
C-More was the VOD service of SBS Belgium. The name and logo are the result of the C More Entertainment group which delivers pay-TV, C More Entertainment was a part of the SBS Broadcasting Group which was bought by the ProSiebenSat.1 Media group which sold it to TV4 Gruppen. After the rename of the channel the service has been renamed MEER (MORE). The service was available through Telenet Digital TV & Belgacom TV and was available on its own website MEER.be. MEER closed on 31 December 2014.

On 28 January 2021, SBS Belgium relaunched a VOD platform, GoPlay.
