= Proximedia Group =

Belgian media group

Proximedia Groep SA
- Traded as: Euronext: XXXX
- Founded: 1998 as Proximedia Belgium, 1999 as Proximedia SA
- Headquarters: Humaniteitslaan 116, B-1070 Brussels
- Area served: Belgium, France, Netherlands, Spain
- Key people: Fabrice Wuyts (CEO and owner)
- Products: Web creation, SEA, corporate videos, Internet Service Provider, Digital Marketing
- Revenue: € 39.1 million (2011)
- Net income: € 3.1 million (2011)
- Number of employees: +-360
- Website: www.proximedia.be

Proximedia Group is a Belgian media group.

== History ==
Proximedia Belgium was founded in 1998, by Fabrice Wuyts and Eric Glachant. The company specializes in providing websites for SMEs. The Proximedia Group SA was founded in 1999 and became the coordinating organization of Proximedia Belgium, Online, Bizbook Channel, Globule Bleu bvba, Click+, Proximedia France, Proximedia Nederland, and Proximedia Spain. The Proximedia Group has been listed at the Free Market of Euronext Brussels since 2005. In 2007, the Proximedia Group founded the Bizbook Channel. This branch specialized in creating corporate videos. In 2008, Proximedia SA took over the web agency Globule Bleu. The following year, Proximedia launched the brand BeUP. They were also elected ‘Enterprise of The Year 2009’ by Ernst & Young. Proximedia launched two new services in 2011: Videobiz and Promobook. In 2012, the Bizbook Channel was launched. Proximedia was acquired by Publicis Groupe S.A. in July 2014.

== Branches ==
- Proximedia Belgium: the oldest branch of the Proximedia Group. It makes websites and provides support for their customers. Similar branches are Proximedia France and Proximedia Nederland.
- Batibouw +: specialized in bringing contractors and clients together.
- Bizbook Channel: specialized in creating corporate videos for SMEs.
- Click+: offers the management of Google AdWords campaigns. This contains advertising in Google's search results.
- Globule Bleu: specialized in digital campaigns for larger companies or organisations.
- Online: an Internet Service Provider (ISP) that provides internet access, domain names, hosting of websites and data centers, email service, etc.
- Bizbook: an online guestbook where users can post reviews on products and services of a company.
- Promobook: an online service which can be used to print promotions and coupons.

== Key figures ==
Core Numbers (2011)
Turnover	+4.4%	39.1 million
Operating profit	+8,8%	€6,4 million
Net profit (before goodwill depreciation)	+10,3%	€3,6 million
Net profit (group share)	+14,3%	€3,1 million

== Sale tactics and lawsuits ==
There are a lot of websites, forums and blogs that warn for Proximedia. This is because of the long duration of the contract, the inability to terminate the contract and the alleged aggressive approach of Proximedia and the alleged low quality of service that Proximedia offers. Also, there are a lot of lawsuits every month, some of which are customers that wish to terminate the contract, others that allege Proximedia of misguiding.

List of some example lawsuits:

- Mitigation of contractual termination compensation on the basis of article 6:248 paragraph 2 of the Dutch Civil Code
- A clause on the basis of which a termination fee is claimed can be considered a penalty clause. Mitigation of the penalty based on article 6:94 of the Dutch Civil Code?
- Performance claim rejected; successful appeal to breach of contract; dissolution; restitution claim awarded.
- Agreement for IT services. Contents of the agreement. No reflex effect of the Door-to-Door Sales Act for small entrepreneurs. Implementation Act of the Consumer Rights Directive. Breach of contract? Unreasonably onerous clause?
- Cassation: ECLI:NL:HR:2016:996, (Partial) annulment with referral. Final judgment: ECLI:NL:GHSHE:2014:4228
- Error. Reflex effect of the unfair commercial practices law? Compelling evidentiary force of written agreement.
- (No summary provided by court)
- Proximedia case. No valid defense against the claim concerning a number of monthly invoices. Article 7.1 of the agreement (containing a termination fee) is a general term in the sense of article 6:231 introductory text and under a of the Dutch Civil Code. No "reflex effect" of article 6:237 introductory text and under i of the Dutch Civil Code. Insufficiently argued why article 7.1 would be unreasonably onerous in the sense of article 6:233 of the Dutch Civil Code and that granting the claim would be unacceptable according to standards of reasonableness and fairness. Termination fee is not a penalty in the sense of article 6:91 of the Dutch Civil Code.
- A retailer (sole proprietorship) is approached by a representative of a company and enters into an "agreement for IT services" with a term of four years, which includes a dissolution fee of 60% of the not yet due monthly payments. The retailer is instructed to prove that, at the time of entering the agreement, the company promised him that he could terminate the agreement without any further obligations if he terminated his business. The retailer is considered to have succeeded in the burden of proof, and the company's claim for payment of the dissolution fee is rejected.
