= .tp =

Former Internet country code top-level domain for Timor-Leste

- .tp Domain Registration
- Introduced: December 1997
- Removed: February 2015
- TLD type: Country code top-level domain
- Status: Deleted in favour of new ccTLD, .tl
- Registry: Timor-Leste NIC
- Intended use: Entities connected with Timor-Leste
- Structure: Registrations were accepted directly at second level, with some sites (mostly governmental) at third level

.tp was the listed Internet country code top-level domain (ccTLD) for Timor-Leste. The letters refer to Timor Português or Portuguese Timor, the name of the present independent nation when it was an overseas territory of Portugal. The domain .tp was officially launched in December 1997 by connect.ie, an internet service provider based in Dublin, Ireland, in cooperation with the East Timorese authorities in absentia, while Timor-Leste was under Indonesian occupation.

.tp remained active for the period of transition, although it now no longer complies with the ISO 3166-1 standard for the two-letter codes for the name of countries as the code for Timor-Leste changed from TP to TL after independence in 2002. Regardless, it retained a number of domains until it was finally deleted in February 2015. The last listed change and update for .tp was on April 22, 2008.

== History ==
In 1997, connect.ie discussed the potential of setting up a "virtual East Timor". They communicated these ideas to the East Timorese leadership and their representatives. This set in motion the acquisition the .tp domain (then the only available official nomenclature for East Timor). After discussions with Jon Postel, IANA, it was realized that a set of necessary registration conditions would require to be met, including the provision of a local contact persons details. It was assumed by all parties in this discussion that there was a strong likelihood for a potential negative reaction to any person or indeed location listed for such purposes. After discussion with various East Timorese representatives, it was agreed that Xanana Gusmão, was at that time imprisoned in Jakarta, would be the appropriate contact person. The remaining issue and solution to providing local addressing and other contact details were provided by connect.ie. A telephone call was made to Dili to identify the address and telephone number of the Military Governor, the last local location of Xanana Gusmão. These details were provided to and accepted by IANA. The .tp domain registry was successfully acquired and activated mainly for the purpose of "declaring independence" at least in the virtual world.

The subsequent attack on the .tp domain registry gained extensive worldwide media coverage and public support. Within 6 days of this occurring, and much to everyone's surprise, Indonesian President Bacharuddin Jusuf Habibie announced that a referendum would be held in East Timor to choose between special autonomy and independence. This activity finally concluded when Timor-Leste became the first new sovereign state of the 21st century on May 20, 2002.

== First "Internet" War ==
During the 1999 East Timorese crisis the cctld server services for the '.tp' domain were attacked by hackers believed to be at the behest and with support from a faction of the Indonesian military. Connect Ireland also received malicious telephone calls and other communications at this time.

== Confusion ==
In August 1999, before the holding of the referendum, one of the independence leaders, José Ramos-Horta (to be later President of Timor-Leste), was purported to have stated that arrangements had been made for hackers to attack Indonesian sites. In response to these press reports, connect.ie issued a statement in response to these purported reports condemning any use of hacking for any activity that would negatively impact on ordinary Indonesian citizens, stating that they (CI) were not at "war" with the Indonesian people and cited the support that they had received from many Indonesian people after the earlier attack on the .tp domain.

== Transition to .tl ==
.tl is the ccTLD that now complies with the ISO 3166-1 standard. The Department of Information Technology in Timor-Leste is working cooperatively with Connect Ireland to ensure a stable and secure transition to the .tl ccTLD. Existing registrants in the .tp ccTLD were initially granted the same domain in the .tl ccTLD at no cost for the first year of registration. Both the .tp and .tl "versions" continue to resolve and registrant information, whois data, and name server delegations were to be the same for both .tl and .tp, for legacy domains.

As of June 2005, no further registrations were accepted in the .tp domain.

Registration in .tl is available directly at second-level with no local presence requirement, through CoCCA and various resellers worldwide.

In 2008, search engines found approximately twice as many pages in the .tp domain as in its successor, .tl . By October 2009, this ratio dropped to 1:8, .tl being the more dominant. As of 2013, the same metric reached an insignificant 1:10000 in favour of .tl.

In 2015, the TLD was deactivated.

== Dated IANA information ==
For a long time, according to the IANA site, .tl was listed as unassigned, with .tp still being listed for East Timor (Xanana Gusmão, a major political figure and former president, is the administrative contact). The Department of Information Technology in East Timor sent a letter to IANA requesting that this information be updated. As of September 30, 2005, the update had been made and .tl is listed as an active top-level domain.
