= Portable =

Portable may refer to:

== General ==
- Portable building, a manufactured structure that is built off site and moved in upon completion of site and utility work
- Portable classroom, a temporary building installed on the grounds of a school to provide additional classroom space where there is a shortage of capacity
- Portable toilet, a modern, portable, self-contained outhouse manufactured of molded plastic

== Computing ==
- Portable object (computing), a distributed computing term for an object which can be accessed through a normal method call while possibly residing in memory on another computer
- Software portability, software that can easily be ported to multiple platforms
- Portable applications, applications that do not require any kind of installation onto a computer, and can store data in the program's directory

== Electronics ==
- Portable electronics
- Portable device, a wearable or handheld device
- Portable audio player, a personal electronic device that allows the user to listen to recorded or broadcast audio whilst being mobile
- Portable computer, a computer that is designed to be moved from one place to another
  - Compaq Portable series (1982–?)
  - Apricot Portable (1984)
  - IBM Portable Personal Computer (1984)
  - Macintosh Portable (1989–1991) from Apple Computer
- Handheld game console, a lightweight, portable electronic machine for playing video games

== Music ==
- Portable Life, a 1999 album by Danielle Brisebois
- Portable Sounds a 2007 album by TobyMac.

== People ==
- Portable (musician), Nigerian singer-songwriter, rapper.

== See also ==
- Portability (disambiguation)
