= Timor Plaza =

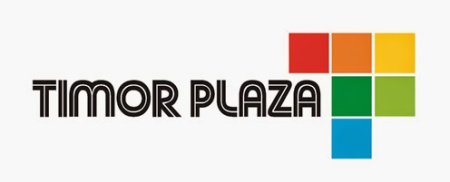

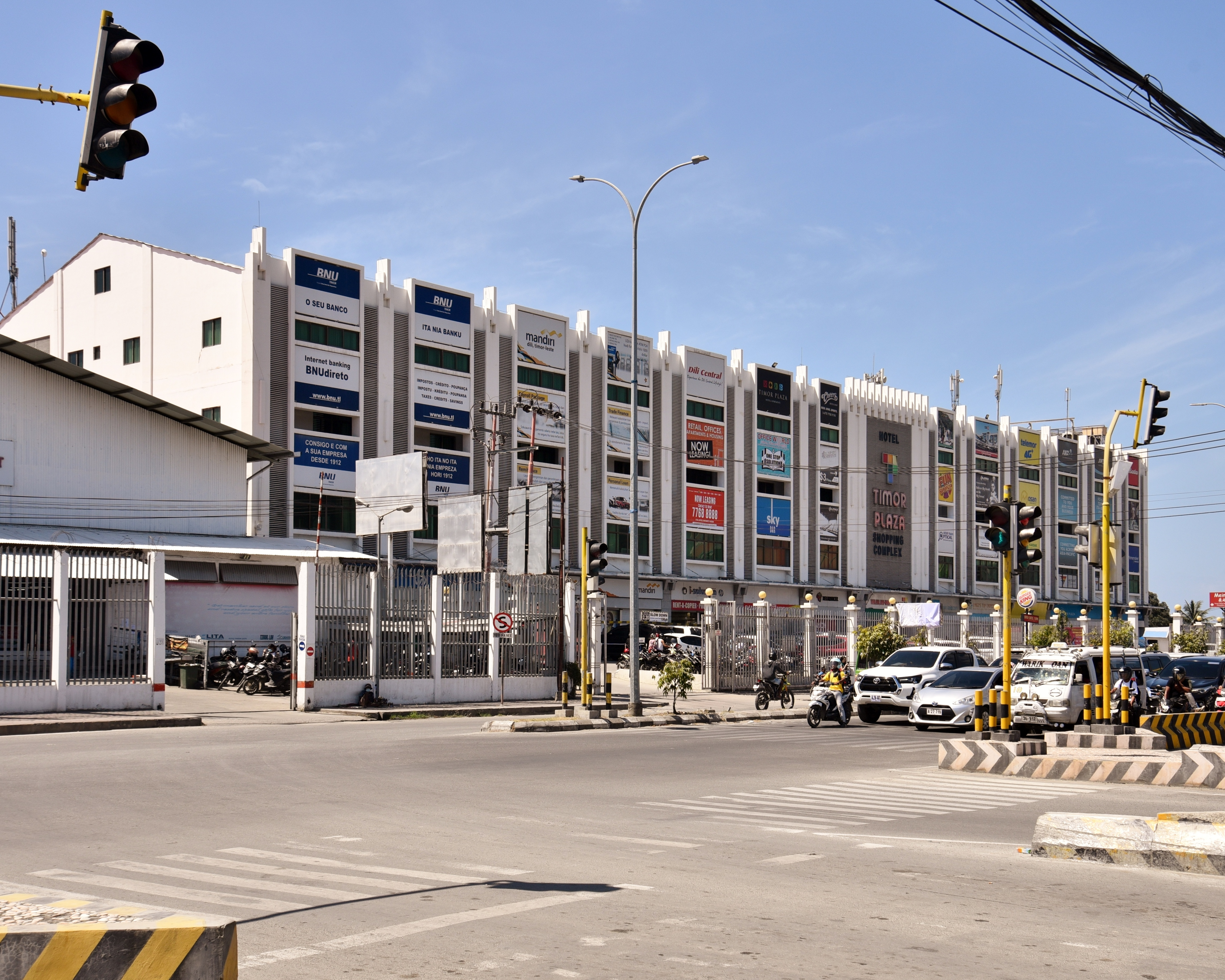
- Timor Plaza in 2023
- Coordinates: 8°33′S 125°32′E
- Address: Avenida Presidente Nicolau Lobato, Bebonuk; Dili, Timor-Leste
- Opened: October 2011
- Website: Timor Plaza

Timor Plaza is a shopping centre in Dili, capital city of Timor-Leste. Part of the Dili Central compound, it is located on Avenida Presidente Nicolau Lobato in Bebonuk, one of the sucos of Dili. As of 2021, the compound included six office buildings, a hotel, supermarkets, restaurants and a cinema.

== History ==
The centre was the first modern shopping mall in Timor-Leste. It was built by Dili Development Company Lda. (DDC), a member of the Jape Group of Companies.

DDC was established in 2009. Construction of the shopping centre had begun by mid-2010; at that time, the first phase of the whole 5 ha (12 acres) Dili Central development was expected to cost US$10 million, as part of a US$30 million total.

The family-owned Jape Group had been founded in Darwin, Australia, in 1976. Its founder, Jape Kong Su, was a Balibo-born East Timorese of Chinese descent, who had fled from the former Portuguese Timor during its invasion by Indonesia the previous year.

In 1999, Jape returned to his Timorese homeland to assist in the process of national reconstruction. Through his companies, he became the country's biggest private sector investor, with the companies' Timor Plaza project being a substantial privately funded landmark in the rebuilding of Dili.

Realisation of the project generated controversy. The Jape family was accused of evicting many families from the project site, and thus prompting tensions among developers, local landowners, and a local non-governmental organisation (NGO), Matadalan ba Rai-Haburas Foundation, which assisted the evicted families. Another local NGO, La'o Hamutuk, claimed that the Jape family's projects had not only displaced "local people and vendors", but also violated environmental laws. Eventually, by early 2013, the developer compensated 192 families, most by agreement, but a few only after they had taken their cases to court, and obtained a determination that their land had been illegally expropriated.

Meanwhile, Timor Plaza's first phase opened in October 2011. Six months later, in March 2012, an article in The Sydney Morning Herald commented that the shopping centre was:

"... a multimillion-dollar statement of faith that [Timor-Leste's] future will be more affluent than the present and more stable than the past."

The article went on to quote Timor Plaza's sales and marketing manager as saying that the centre's market was "the A and B demographic". However, it then reported that the centre's interior had been "deserted", and opined that "... signs of an affluent middle class are scarce ..." both in the centre and in the streets. By contrast, an article published by The Myanmar Times in December 2014 described the centre much more positively as "... a spiffy new shopping mall that would not be out of place in Singapore ..."

At a ceremony held in December 2023 that included a store blessing and local music, the President of Timor-Leste, José Ramos-Horta, inaugurated Jack's of Timor-Leste, the first department store to open at Timor Plaza, and in the country generally. The store, located within the CBD 10 building at Dili Central, is part of a chain operated by Jack's Retail, a Fiji-based company with around 50 outlets in Fiji and others in Papua New Guinea.

== Description ==
Timor Plaza is four storeys high. As of 2021, the Dili Central compound, of which the shopping centre is a part, included six office buildings, a hotel, supermarkets, restaurants and a cinema. That year, La'o Hamutuk claimed that the compound:

"... has lured shoppers and offices away from commercial areas, hurting local businesses.

Most banks and phone companies have moved there, as well as some state agencies."

Earlier, an article in Southeast Asian Affairs, an annual review published by the ISEAS – Yusof Ishak Institute, Singapore, described the Timor Plaza of 2014 as "... a bustling shopping mall with fancy establishments like cafés, restaurants, fashion stores, bookshops, a cinema and even an Apple Macintosh outpost." The article also observed that the centre has upmarket office facilities occupied by many international tenants.

The more downbeat assessment of The Sydney Morning Herald, in its 2012 article, was that the centre had bleached interiors, glass-sided elevators and fluorescent lights that made it "... the cousin of every shopping mall in almost every city in the world."
