= Play Fictie =

Belgian television channel

- Country: Belgium

Programming
- Picture format: 576i SDTV

Ownership
- Owner: Play Media
- Sister channels: Play, Play Actie, Play Reality, Play Crime

History
- Launched: 30 September 2004; 22 years ago
- Former names: VT5 (working name, after VT4); VIJFtv (2004-2012); VIJF (2012-2021); Play5 (2021-2025)

Links
- Website: goplay.be

Play Fictie (formerly Play5) is a Belgian-Flemish commercial television channel owned by Play Media. It is a sister channel to Play and is owned by Play Media, owned by the Telenet Group.

== History ==
=== VT5 ===
As early as November 1998, SBS Broadcasting had planned the creation of a second channel. That month, long-term plans for a VT5 network were leaked, causing discomfort at the existing channel. One of VT4's expansion possibilities at the time was the creation of a second channel, as well as possible options for radio and the internet, but the possibilities for financing VT5 were impossible for the time. With VT4 planning for a local licence in Flanders in December 1998, the hypothesis of launching a second channel were still slim. The move came when its sister operations in the Netherlands were setting up NET5, set to start in March of the following year. In 2000, in case VT5 would launch, it would launch at a faster pace than VT4, which took six months to consolidate itself. VT4 also planned to launch an SBS 5 channel in 2001. It was determined that VT5 would be a youth channel, akin to Veronica in the Netherlands, competing against VTM's JIMtv.

The launch of SBS's second Belgian channel was repeatedly delayed due to accumulated debt and leadership changes. By 2002, with VT4 achieving stabilisation, the license for VT5 which was still on hold would increase its demographic range to a more "younger and aggressive" demographic. Another factor was the status of the Flemish advertising market. VT4 stated that, if there was no growth, there would be no chances to launch VT5.

In 2004, VT4 finally moved to Nossegem, in the outskirts of Brussels, while gaining a Flemish license in the process. This enabled VT4 to launch new channels, as the new facilities in Zaventem were able to playout for two "analogue stations" (VT4 and VT5), as well as new channels taking into account the rise of digital television. In June, it was confirmed that VT5 (the name hadn't been finalised yet) was set to launch on 1 October on 97% of Flemish households. The initial plan of targeting the 15-44 demographic was still in place.

=== VIJFtv ===
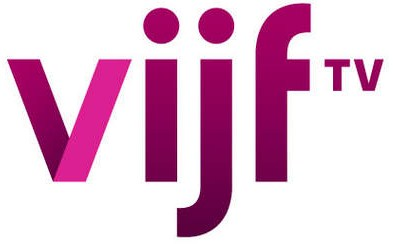
Old VIJF logo between 2011 and 2012.

In September, SBS unveiled a new name for the channel, VIJFtv, and was aimed at the 20-44 female audience.

The 1 October launch was pushed back to 30 September, where the first broadcast was that of a soccer game, a UEFA Club match between Bochum and Standard Liège, even though women are the channel's target audience. By doing that the station made sure that men also would set their TV up to view VIJF. This was seen as an advertising strategy to encourage mass tuning of the new channel on cable, under the grounds that sporting events were also seen by women. Three Belgian teams were in the group stage and SBS had the rights to two matches (VT4's was Châteauroux vs. Club Brugge), while KANAALTWEE, VT4's competitor, had the rights to the match between Beveren and Levski Sofia.

In 2005, its first full year of operation, VIJFtv gained a 5% market share in Flanders, almost matching Kanaaltwee and VT4.

In January 2006, VIJFtv doubled its programming hours and began broadcasting 24 hours every day.

VIJFtv began broadcasting the American daytime soap opera The Bold and the Beautiful (in Dutch Mooi en Meedogenloos) on 4 January 2006. It was first shown on public TV, then on VTM, but the rights were sold to SBS Belgium. That also caused an increase of the market share in the early evening.

During the Soccer World Championship, broadcast on Kanaaltwee and VT4, VIJFtv broadcast "women-friendly" programs, as well as movies such as Notting Hill, to complement VT4's offers. They did this using the slogan Vrouwen weten waarom ("Women know why"), referring to the popular Jupiler beer slogan Mannen weten waarom ("Men know why"). When the campaign started on 1 June, VIJFtv hadn't received confirmation from Jupiler regarding a possible advertising response. The formula was a success and VIJF's market share grew even further.

On 27 August 2007, VIJF relaunched with 15 new station idents. On the same day, the channel introduced in-vision continuity. Prior to the change in presentation, VIJFtv used Now/Next/Later visuals and voice overs.

In February 2011, The Bold and the Beautiful moved to VT4, with the aim of achieving higher ratings.

=== VIJF / Play5 ===
On 3 September 2012, VIJFtv's name changed to VIJF, along with new programming and new TV shows.

On 7 June 2019, it was announced that the channel would be eventually rebranded as "Five" and shift to a more general entertainment format as part of the rebranding under the "Play" name. The following year, it was decided that the channel would instead rebrand as Play5 on 28 January 2021.

In January 2024, Play5 announced that it took the rights to Neighbours from VTM 2, with the premiere of the revival coming in February, a few days after VTM 2 finished airing the finale. Episodes were five months behind Australia, a shorter gap than VTM's 1.5 years.

=== Play Fictie ===
On 13 October 2025, Play Media announced that Play5 is rebranded as Play Fictie as part of company wide rebranding, alongside sister channel Play4 which was rebranded as Play.

== Internet television ==
In 2007, VIJF struck a deal with Zattoo so that Belgian residents can watch the channel using their online television service for free. With the closure of the Belgian Zattoo service in early 2009, VIJFtv disappeared from the platform.
