= Telephone number portability =

Telephone number portability can refer to:

- Mobile number portability - telephone number portability for mobile phone users.
- Local number portability - telephone number portability for landline users.
- Toll-free number portability - telephone number portability for freephone subscribers.
