= Orange Belgium =

Mobile network and internet provider

Orange Belgium S.A./N.V.
- Type: Public
- Traded as: Euronext Brussels: OBEL
- Industry: Telecommunications
- Predecessor: Mobistar
- Founded: 1996; 30 years ago (as Mobistar)
- Headquarters: Brussels, Belgium
- Key people: Xavier Pichon (CEO); Jan Steyaert (chairman)
- Services: Mobile and fixed-line telephony, ADSL, Cable TV
- Revenue: €1.235 billion (2015)
- Number of employees: 1,712 (2015)
- Parent: Orange S.A. (76.97%)
- Website: www.orange.be

Orange Belgium (known as Orange) is a Belgian telecommunications company. It competes with Proximus and Base. It also operates internet and mobile services in Luxembourg through its local subsidiary, Orange Luxembourg, following the acquisition of VOXMobile in 2007, which was subsequently rebranded under the Orange Brand.

It was incorporated by France Télécom in 1996 under the name of Mobistar. The company re-branded as Orange on 9 May 2016 (following its parent company's own change of name in 2013).

== History ==
Mobistar, today Orange Belgium, was founded in 1996 as a joint venture between Telinfo and France Télécom (now Orange S.A.), building a GSM 900 network and then founding a complementary DCS 1800 network.

Initially Mobistar added to its network coverage by signing contracts with providers such as Motorola & Talkline, Cellway, a subsidiary of Martin Dawes Telecommunications and Debitel Belgium, the latter two which it would take over respectively in 1997 and 2000.

Mobistar claims to have been the first GPRS operator in Belgium.

In May 2007 Mobistar bought 90% of the shares of VOXmobile (today: Orange Communications Luxembourg S.A.), a mobile phone company of Luxembourg. VOXmobile was rebranded as Orange on 28 October 2009.

In October 2010 Mobistar launched a €55/month hybrid satellite/internet TV package, Starpack to provide phone customers with multichannel TV. Mobistar TV combines DTH satellite TV with ADSL Internet to provide over 500 satellite TV and radio channels, along with interactive services, catch-up TV and content-on-demand via the Internet, and programme recording management via a smartphone. The satellite TV package includes Flemish national channels, HD and 3D channels, and a range of European free-to-air channels, all transmitted from Astra satellites. Mobistar has announced that this service will end on September 15, 2013.

In May 2016 Mobistar was rebranded in Orange Belgium. The company became a convergent operator with the launch of its TV and internet offer based on the cable technology a few months earlier.

== Company ==
Orange Belgium is majority-owned by the Orange S.A. holding company Atlas Services Belgium (ASB), which holds a 76.97% stake. It is a member of the FreeMove alliance.

In 2024, Orange Belgium acquired the cable operator VOO.

== Mobile virtual network operator ==
The Orange Belgium network is used by a number of mobile virtual network operators.

== Technical information ==
Orange Belgium offers 2G, 3G, 4G, 4G+ and 5G mobile technologies.

Orange proposes Internet, mobile, TV and triple-play offers via co-axial cable.

== See also ==
- List of mobile network operators in Europe
