= BASE (mobile operator) =

Belgian mobile telephony provider

- Type: Naamloze vennootschap / Société anonyme
- Industry: Telecommunications
- Founded: 1999; 27 years ago
- Headquarters: Mechelen, Belgium
- Services: Mobile telephony, Internet, and TV
- Revenue: €610,000,000 (2014)
- Number of employees: 824
- Parent: Telenet Group
- Website: www.base.be

Base (stylized as BASE) is a telecommunications operator in Belgium, offering mobile telephony, internet, and TV. It is a subsidiary of Telenet. It competes with Proximus and Orange Belgium. It was previously owned by KPN and sold to Telenet in 2015.

== History ==
=== KPN Orange ===
Base was founded as Belgium's third major mobile network operator in 1999 under the brand name of KPN Orange. It was a joint venture between the Dutch KPN Mobile and the then British Orange telcos.

=== KPN Mobile ===
In 2001, France Télécom acquired Orange. Because France Télécom was already active on the Belgian market as Mobistar (later known as Orange Belgium), it wasn't allowed to control two competitive networks. As a result, Base's shares were fully sold to KPN Mobile. In 2002, the brand name was changed from Orange to Base.

The fixed line and broadband operations were started in 2007 after the acquisition of Tele2 Belgium. In October 2009 the fixed line and broadband ADSL operations were rebranded from Tele2 to Base.

In 2007, Base purchased the Belgian telecommunications retail store Allo Telecom, which merged with Base in 2014.

=== Acquisition by Telenet Group ===
In April 2015, it was announced that Base was being bought by Telenet for 1,325 billion euros, which would give Telenet access to a mobile network.

Base has an estimated 98% coverage of the country and 26% market share in mobile communications.

=== BASE Internet & TV ===
After 25 years of being a mobile-only operator, BASE launched in June 2024 broadband internet and IPTV services. The launch contributed to Telenet's strategy to expand its geographical coverage to Wallonia (except for mobile telephony, Telenet was mainly available in Flanders), and to offer a complete range of telecoms services as a value for money solution.

In order to be able to offer their new services throughout Belgium, BASE relies on the broadband networks of two different providers: the network of Wyre (a joint venture between Telenet and network operator Fluvius), and the network of VOO (acquired by Orange Belgium).

== Technical information ==
The operator's display logo is BASE, the net code is 206 20, and it operates under 900/1800 MHz GSM, 900/2100 MHz UMTS, 800/1800/2600 MHz LTE.

== Network ==
Base has its own mobile network offering 2G, 4G, and 5G. Since July 2025, 3G networks have been switched off by all Belgian operators.

Base and Telenet have been gradually rolling out 5G on their own network since December 2021. Since 2023, Base/Telenet provide 90% of the households in Belgium with an indoor 5G coverage. The outdoor coverage is almost 100%.

== Partnerships & Sponsorships ==
From 2005 until 2018 Base sponsored football club Standard Liège.

In 2026, Base started a collaboration with Brussels-based singer-songwriter Camille Yembe. Together, they searched for unknown music talent who wanted to create a song and a music video with her.

== Awards ==
The My BASE app received an honourable mention in the User Experience Design category for the Innovation by Design Awards from Fast Company.

== See also ==
- List of mobile network operators in Europe
