= Play Actie =

Flemish television channel

- Country: Belgium

Programming
- Language: Dutch

Ownership
- Owner: Play Media
- Sister channels: Play, Play Fictie, Play Reality, Play Crime

History
- Launched: 6 October 2016
- Former names: ZES (2016-2021); Play6 (2021-2025)

Links
- Website: goplay.be

Availability

Play Actie (formerly Play6) is a Belgian commercial television channel for the Flemish public which started broadcasting on 6 October 2016. It is part of Play Media. The channel is a sister channel of Play and Play Fictie. Play Actie focuses on older, successful series, movies and sitcoms. Most of them are of American origin. Furthermore, the channel is the first Flemish one to focus on the broadcast of series with all episodes of one or more seasons directly after each other.

== History ==
On 14 June 2016, SBS Belgium announced to launch a third channel named ZES. Main reason is that their other channels, VIER and VIJF, will more focus on Flemish productions. As there is still a market which wanted to see foreign, mainly English-languaged movies, sitcoms and series, it was decided to move the broadcast of these programs previously broadcast in the two other channels to this new channel. ZES launched on 6 October 2016.

On 28 January 2021, the channel was rebranded as Play6 as part of the rebranding under the "Play" name.

On 13 October 2025, Play Media announced that Play6 is rebranded as Play Actie as part of company wide rebranding campaign.
