= Proximus =

Telecommunications and ICT company in Belgium

- Type: Naamloze vennootschap
- Industry: Telecommunications
- Founded: 1994; 32 years ago
- Headquarters: Brussels, Belgium
- Key people: Guillaume Boutin
- Products: Mobile telephony Mobile broadband
- Parent: Proximus Group
- Website: proximus.be

Proximus (formerly known as Belgacom Mobile) is the largest of Belgium's three mobile telecommunications companies and is a part of Proximus Group (previously Belgacom Group). It competes with Orange Belgium and Base.

== History ==
Proximus was founded in 1994 as a joint venture between Belgacom, 75%, and AirTouch, 25%, respectively. AirTouch was later merged with Vodafone. In 2006, Belgacom bought the remaining Vodafone shares.

Starting in January 1994, Proximus took over the operatorship of the old MOB2 analogue network, as well as the new second-generation GSM network, originally only in the GSM 900 range. The obsolete MOB2 network was retired in 1999. When necessary, Proximus can also use GSM 1800 to complement its network.

It was originally a de facto monopoly, but after deregulation, Mobistar (now Orange Belgium), a second GSM 900 operator, soon joined the game in 1998, followed by BASE – then known as KPN-Orange UK – in 1999.

In 2014, Belgacom included its Pay-TV business under the Proximus brand name, which then would include its landline and mobile telephone services as well as all of its broadband services.

Proximus has remained a leader, having between 40-50% of the market share at the end of 2024, with Telenet (which includes BASE) and Orange Belgium trailing behind with 20-30% each.

== Company ==
Logo of Belgacom as of 2000

Proximus Mobile was a subsidiary of Belgacom, which had an IPO in 2004 but remains more than 50% state-owned. A 25% share was owned by the Vodafone Group until 2006, when Vodafone agreed to sell its stake to Belgacom. In 2004, it had a revenue of €2,239 million and an EBITDA of €1,135 million. In 2014, Belgacom was rebranded to Proximus under the leadership of Dominique Leroy. As of January 2015, Belgacom continued its partnership with Vodafone, even after being sold to Belgacom. Proximus Mobile is now fully integrated into the Proximus Group and is no longer a subsidiary.

Proximus uses the brand name Tango in Luxembourg.

== Technical information ==
The operator's display logo is PROXIMUS (sometimes displayed as BEL PROXIMUS or Proximus), the net code is 206 01, and it operates under GSM 900/1800 MHz, UMTS 900/2100 MHz, and LTE 1800 MHz frequencies. Its prepaid service is called Pay&Go.

== Mobile virtual network operator ==
The Proximus network is used by a number of Mobile Virtual Network Operators such as TMF Mobile (MTV Networks Benelux), Mobisud, RSCA Mobile, Dommel, and PostMobile (bpost).

== See also ==
- List of mobile network operators in Europe
