= Ono (Spain) =

Spanish telecommunications company

ONO
- Company type: Subsidiary
- Industry: Telecommunications
- Founded: 29 September 1998
- Defunct: 8 April 2019
- Headquarters: Madrid, Spain
- Key people: Vittorio Colao (CEO), Eugenio Galdón (Chairman)
- Products: Broadband Internet access, cable television, telephone
- Revenue: €1.6 billion (2008)
- Operating income: €1.1 billion (2006)
- Net income: €0.7 billion (EBITDA, 2008)
- Number of employees: 3,500
- Parent: Vodafone Group plc
- Website: www.ono.es

ONO was a Spanish broadband communication and entertainment company, delivering integrated telephone, television and Internet services to its residential customers. In this segment, it has 3.7 million services contracted and over six million users.

ONO was incorporated in 1998. Before commencing its operations, ONO's then-parent company Cableuropa (founded in 1992) took part in a series of competitive tenders which were called after the coming into force of Spain's General Telecommunications by Cable Act 42/95. From 1996 to 1998, ONO was awarded the licenses to provide cable television and telecommunications services in the regions of Valencia, Castellón de la Plana, Alicante, Murcia, Cádiz, Huelva, Cantabria, Mallorca and Albacete. Between late 1998 and early 1999, a financial interest in ONO, along with an operational management deal, was signed by Dick Callahan's telecommunications holding company, Callahan Associates International.

As the company rolled out its own latest-generation network across its regions, users started to enjoy its TV, telephone and Internet services. By the end of 2002, ONO was already present in approximately one in every three homes prepared to receive its services. A year later, it was awarded the license to operate in Castile-La Mancha and, in 2004, it acquired the telecommunications operator Retecal, covering Castile and León, Spain’s second largest region by geographical area.

In November 2005, ONO closed the acquisition of 100% of the telecoms company Auna Tlc, thereby consolidating its presence as Spain's leading broadband communications and entertainment company and extending its services to the communities of Aragon, Andalusia (excluding Cadiz and Huelva, which already belonged to ONO), the Canary Islands, Catalonia, La Rioja, Madrid and Navarra.

On 17 March 2014, ONO announced it would be acquired by Vodafone Spain for €7.2 billion (US$10 billion), subject to regulatory approval. Vodafone retired the ONO branding on 8 April 2019.

== Company background ==
According to data from its web page, at the end of First Quarter of 2008, ONO had 1.8 million clients and it has rolled out a next generation network that covers over 6,850,000 homes and business. During the last 12 months, the company has released a total of 414,000 new households, an increase of 6.4% year-over-year.

ONO rolled out its own cable network in Spain. In areas where the operator did not offer its proprietary infrastructure, ONO offered phone and Internet service through ULL technology.

Due to Vodafone's acquisition of Ono, Ono became defunct and no longer provide services.

== Shareholders' structure ==
ONO's main shareholders:

- Multitel (21%)
- CCMP Capital (15.2%)
- Providence Equity Partners (15.2%)
- Thomas H. Lee Partners (15.2%)
- Quadrangle Group (9.1%)
- GE Structured Finance (8.9%)
- Caisse de dépôt et placement du Québec (6.7%)
- Grupo Santander (4.5%)
- Sodinteleco (4.5%)

== History ==
In 1998, ONO was awarded licences to build its own next generation network in 11 Spanish regions.

- In May 2004, ONO acquired Retecal, a cable operator from Castilla y León. Because of its precarious financial situation, ONO decided to help the company with a 30 million euros cash investment so that It could continue operations.
- In August 2005, ONO reached an agreement with Grupo Auna shareholders to acquire its telecommunications unit for €2.2 billion. In November 2005, the acquisition was concluded, with the purchase of Auna's cable unit. Soon after ONO started the integration of both companies, creating Spain’s biggest broadband and entertainment alternative operator to former monopoly, Telefónica.

In the wake of the acquisition of Auna, ONO received the support of venture capital firms (JP Morgan Partners, Providence Equity, Thomas H.Lee Company, GE Capital Services Structures Finance Group, Inc., Quadrangle Group).

- By the end of 2005, ONO started broadcasting the new DTT channels.
- In 2006, ONO had to set an up a redundancy program, affecting around 1,000 workers.
- In December 2006, ONO signs an agreement with Telefónica to use its mobile network, thus becoming a mobile virtual network operator (MVNO).
- At the end of 2007, the company launched "ONO io", a convergent fix-mobile phone service.
- In 2008, ONO has announced that it is planning to offer broadband access at 100 Mbit/s using "DOCSIS 3.0" technology protocol. ONO has invested over €9 billion to roll out its network.
- In 2009, ONO has successfully rolled out a 50 Mbit/s connection using DOCSIS 3.0, but only in certain regions of Madrid.

== ONO corporate services ==
ONO offers communications services for business anywhere in Spain.

ONO's broad range of business services can be best summarized as follows:

- Telephone services, offering, in addition to basic services (lines, primary services, exchanges and terminals), multiple advanced options. Additionally, with its VoIP services, it seeks to broaden its product range by incorporating multimedia options into everyday communications.
- High-speed broadband services.
- Managed services such as security, hosting, online backup, ASP tools and e-learning, amongst others.

== ONO residential services ==
ONO has provided combined telephone, television and internet services since it commenced operations in 1998. It implements its own latest-generation cable infrastructure, which provides services to more than 1.8 million direct access customers.

ONO has launched ONO io, the first fixed-mobile convergent phone in Spain for all its residential customers. It offers new smart mobile terminals that allow access to both fixed (at home) and mobile (outdoors) networks, but has discontinued making new contracts for the time being.

== Internet ==
Internet customers can surf the web at speeds of:

- 50 Mbit/s / 5 Mbit/s
- 120 Mbit/s / 12 Mbit/s
- 300 Mbit/s / 30 Mbit/s

== Television ==
Thanks to ONO's technology based on Hybrid Fibre-Coaxial, it's possible to enjoy different contents on different TV sets throughout the home.

ONO also offers OJO, a video on demand (VoD) service, and TiVo, an advanced digital video recorder (DVR) service.

== Fixed phone service ==
ONO offers an all-included package for fixed line customers, with free domestic calls to all fixed line numbers (up to 60 minutes per call). There is a monthly charge of €15 for the line rental

== Mobile phone service ==
The mobile market in Spain is open to all operators since February 2006 through the mechanism of mobile virtual network operators (MVNOs). ONO requested to the CMT (Spanish regulator) a license to operate as an MVNO and signed an agreement with Telefónica to use its mobile network, becoming the fourth operator with a quadruple play offer in Spain: fixed phone, mobile phone, Internet and TV. Other quadruple play operators include Telefónica, Orange and Euskaltel.

== Main competitors ==
Fixed telephony and broadband access:

- Jazztel
- Movistar (a Telefónica company)
- Orange (a France Télécom company)

In paid-TV services:

- Jazzbox (Jazztel, VOD)
- Movistar+ (Movistar, IPTV and satellite)
- Orange TV (Orange, IPTV)
