= Orange España =

Mobile and internet provider

Orange España Opco, S.L.U.
- Trade name: Orange España
- Type: Private limited company
- Industry: Telecommunications
- Predecessor: Amena (Retevisión)
- Founded: 1 August 2006; 20 years ago
- Headquarters: Pozuelo de Alarcón, Spain
- Area served: Nationwide
- Key people: Jean-Marc Vignolles (CEO)
- Revenue: € 4 billion (2012)
- Parent: Orange S.A.
- Website: www.orange.es

Orange España Opco, S.L.U., more commonly known by its trade name of Orange España, is a mobile network operator in Spain owned by Orange. It was previously known as Amena, a brand of Retevisión, until 2005, when it was bought by France Télécom (now Orange S.A.). Its competitors are Movistar and Vodafone Spain.

Its legal headquarters are in Pozuelo de Alarcón, near Madrid.

Orange España is the second mobile phone provider of the four Spanish providers (Movistar, Orange, Vodafone and Yoigo), with 11 million customers. The company also offers TV and Internet (ADSL, FTTH) services.

Orange offers GSM 900/1800 MHz (2G), UMTS 2100MHz (3G) HSDPA (3.5G) and LTE (4G) services. Its network radio access serves to the following MVNOs: MasMovil, Happy Móvil, Jazztel Movil, Día Móvil, República Móvil, Pepephone, Simyo, among others.

On March 8, 2022, Orange Spain and Grupo MásMóvil began merger talks. The merger was approved by both the European Commission and the Spanish government on 12 March 2024.

In January 2024, Orange España suffered a major outage when a hacker was able to access an account for managing the global routing table that controls which networks deliver Orange's Internet traffic. According to security researchers, the hack was a result of 'a concerning lack of security hygiene at Orange'.

== See also ==
- Orange S.A.
