= NRJ (disambiguation) =

NRJ is a French radio station.

NRJ may also refer to:

- NRJ Group, a French multimedia group; owner of NRJ radio
  - NRJ (Belgium)
  - NRJ (Lebanon)
  - NRJ (Quebec), Canada; now known as Énergie
  - NRJ Russia
  - NRJ 12, a French TV channel
  - NRJ Music Award
- Northern Rhodesia Journal, a 1950-1965 government-published history journal
- Naval Air Station Sanford (IATA code 1942–1969)

== See also ==
- NRG (disambiguation)
- Energy (disambiguation)
