= NRJ (Belgium) =

NRJ Belgique
- Brussels; Belgium
- Broadcast area: Belgium; Wallonia
- Frequencies: 91.9 MHz (Charleroi); 104.5 MHz (Liège); 103.7 MHz (Brussels); Full list of other frequencies on NRJ.be

Programming
- Language: French
- Format: Top-40

Ownership
- Owner: NRJ Group
- Sister stations: Chérie FM Belgique (defunct); Nostalgie Wallonie

History
- First air date: June 1994

Links
- Website: nrj.be

NRJ Belgique is a private Belgian radio station broadcasting in Wallonia and Brussels, and is the Belgian version of the popular French radio station NRJ.

A Flemish NRJ was launched on 3 September 2018. Airing in Dutch, it is owned by SBS Belgium and Mediahuis, which propose programming independently from the NRJ Group (unlike its French-language counterpart). Starting in September 2023, this station switched to a non-stop music format (only interrupted with news and advertising) and stopped broadcasting on FM, becoming a DAB+-only station.

== History ==
On 24 June 1994 the Belgian version of NRJ was created by the NRJ Group.

== NRJ Hits TV ==
NRJ Hits TV is Belgium's first and only television channel broadcasting non-stop video clips from French, Belgian and international artists 24/7. It was launched in 2014 as an internet channel, but went on cable/satellite on 29 March 2016. The promise is "Hit Music Only".

In fact, on the plan, Marco Leulier, the channel's program director, found that it was not necessary to broadcast all day, every day music videos only. Formerly, there was a plan of creating an MyNRJ-style block on NRJ Hits TV, but this was later removed.

The channel has three fundamentals:

- 100% Music: A strong promise of musical exclusively programming. This isn't the playlist on the NRJ radio station. The sequences of the clips are mixed to ensure viewers have the best listening experience.
- 100% Hits: A program schedule largely emphasizes on hit music with a focus on recently released songs.
- Big events: NRJ Hits TV covers every NRJ-produced musical events across the world.

Here is a list of programmes broadcast on the channel until 24 August 2017:

- Morning Hit: Daily 7–9 am.
- Teen Pop: Daily 4–5 pm.
- Frenchits: Daily 5–6 pm.
- Extravadance: Fridays and Saturdays 8 pm – midnight.
- 4 extra programs each Wednesday and Sunday: Clip List (6–8 pm), Live Hits (8–9 pm), Cover Hit (9–10 pm), Rap & RnB Non Stop (10 pm – midnight).
- Le Hit NRJ: Saturdays 6–8 pm.
- Hit des Clubs: Fridays 6–8 pm.
- Hit Music Only: All other times.
- There may be a special broadcast from 8 pm to midnight on Thursday.

Here is a list of programmes broadcast on the channel since 25 August 2017:

- Hit Music Only: Daily 9 am – 4 pm & 8 pm – 7 am.
- Morning Hit: Daily 7–9 am.
- Teen Pop: Daily 4–5 pm.
- Frenchits: Daily 5–6 pm.
- Programs from 6 pm to 8 pm: Eurohot 30 (Monday & Thursday), Hit NRJ (Tuesday & Saturday), Clip List (Wednesday & Sunday) and Hit des Clubs (Friday).

== See also ==
- NRJ Group, the Group which owns Chérie FM, NRJ, Nostalgie and Rire & Chansons.
- Nostalgie Wallonie, the Walloon oldies sister radio station.
