= Nostalgie Belgium =

Nostalgie Belgium, can refer to:

- Nostalgie Vlaanderen, the Flemish (Dutch) Belgian version of Nostalgie.
- Nostalgie Wallonie, the Walloon (French) Belgian version of Nostalgie.
