= NRG =

NRG may refer to:

== Music ==
- Several electronic music genres, including:
  - Hi-NRG, an early evolution of new-style disco
  - Hard NRG, a hard form of dance music
  - Euro-NRG, another name for Eurodance
- DJ NRG, an alias of Eurobeat artist Ken Laszlo (Gianni Coraini)
- NRG (South Korean band)
- "N-R-G", a 1990 song by Adamski

== Organisations ==
- Nieuw Republikeins Genootschap, a Dutch republican society
- NRG Energy, an energy company
  - NRG Park, Houston, Texas, US
  - NRG Stadium
  - NRG Station, Philadelphia, Pennsylvania, US
- NRG Engineering, Singapore
- NRG360, previously nrg, a defunct Israeli news site
- NRG Networks, a UK-based business networking organisation
- NRG Recording Studios in North Hollywood, US
- Nuclear Research and Consultancy Group, Netherlands
- NRG Esports, an American esports organization
- Gestetner Group, later NRG Group
- NRG Realfagsgymnas, a Norwegian private school
- Northern Research Group, a group of MPs within the UK Conservative Party

== Biochemistry and medicine ==
- Neuregulins:
  - Neuregulin 1 or NRG1
  - Neuregulin 2 or NRG2
  - Neuregulin 3 or NRG3
  - Neuregulin 4 or NRG4
- Psychoactive compounds:
  - Naphyrone (NRG-1)
  - 4-MEC (NRG-2)
  - Pentylone (NRG-3)
  - RCS-4 (NRG-4)
  - 5-IAI (NRG-5)
- NRG, the medial zone of the reticular formation of the caudal pons and rostral medulla oblongata

== Other ==
- NRG (file format), used by the Nero Burning ROM utility
- Numerical renormalization group, a numerical technique to solve certain many-body problems where quantum impurity physics plays a key role
- New River Gorge National Park and Preserve

== See also ==
- Energy (disambiguation)
- NRJ (disambiguation)
- NAG (disambiguation)
