= Enerhiya =

Enerhia or Enerhiya is an alternative of more common Energia. In some countries of the Central and Eastern Europe the sharp g phoneme is used interchangeably with the more "deaf" (less noticeable) h phoneme.

It may refer to:

- FC Enerhiya Nova Kakhovka, a Ukrainian football team
- FC Enerhiya Yuzhnoukrainsk, a Ukrainian football team
- FC Enerhiya Mykolaiv, a Ukrainian football team

== See also ==
- Energy (disambiguation)
- Energie (disambiguation)
- Energia (disambiguation)
