= Energy (disambiguation) =

In physics, energy is the quantitative property that must be transferred to an object in order to perform work on, or to heat, the object.

Energy may also refer to:

== Science and philosophy ==
- Energy (Aristotle), "actuality" in Aristotelian philosophy
- Energy (esotericism), a concept in spirituality and alternative medicine
- Energy (psychological), a postulated principle underlying mental processes
- Energy (signal processing), the energy E_{s} of a continuous-time signal x(t)
- Energy (journal), a scientific journal published by Elsevier
- Energies (journal), a scientific journal published by MDPI

== Music ==
- Energy (event), an annual techno-music event in Zurich, Switzerland
- Energy Rekords, a record label
- Trance Energy or Energy, an annual trance-music event in the Netherlands

=== Bands ===
- Energy (American band), a punk rock band
- Energy (Taiwanese band), a Taiwanese boy group
- Energy, a fusion jazz-rock-blues band Energy featuring Tommy Bolin

=== Albums ===
- Energy (Fourplay album), 2008
- Energy (Disclosure album), 2020
- Energy (Jeremy Steig album), 1971
- Energy (Operation Ivy album), 1989
- Energy (Pointer Sisters album), 1978

=== Songs ===
- "Energy" (Beyoncé song), featuring Beam, 2022
- "Energy" (Disclosure song), 2020
- "Energy" (Drake song), 2015
- "Energy" (Keri Hilson song), 2009
- "Energy" (Nuša Derenda song), entry for the 2001 Eurovision Song Contest
- "Energy" (Stace Cadet and KLP song), 2020
- "Energy (Stay Far Away)", by Skepta and Wizkid, 2018
- "Energy", by A Guy Called Gerald and in collaboration with Goldie from Black Secret Technology, 1995
- "Energy", by the Apples in Stereo from New Magnetic Wonder, 2007
- "Energy", by Ava Max and Bia from Official FIFA World Cup 2026 Album, 2026
- "Energy", by Collective Soul from Seven Year Itch, 2001
- "Energy", by Joe Satriani from What Happens Next, 2018
- "Energy", by Krokus from Krokus, 1976
- "Energy", by Melissa Manchester from Mathematics, 1985
- "Energy", by the Pillows from Pantomime, 1990
- "The Energy", by Audiovent from Dirty Sexy Knights in Paris, 2002
- "The Energy (Feel the Vibe)", by Astro Trax and Shola Phillips, 1998
- "The Energy", by Shinedown from The Sound of Madness, 2008

== Media ==
=== Radio stations ===
- NRJ Radio in Paris, France
- DWET-FM Energy FM 106.7 in the Philippines
- KZCE Energy 92.7 and 101.1 in Phoenix, Arizona
- KWFN, formerly Energy 97.3 in San Diego, California
- KSON (FM), formerly Energy FM 103.7 San Diego, California
- KREV (FM) Energy 92.7 in San Francisco, California
- WCPY formerly Energy 92.5 and 92.7 in Arlington Heights, Chicago, Illinois
- WCLR (FM) formerly Energy 92.5 and 92.7 in DeKalb, Illinois
- WVLI formerly Energy 92.5 and 92.7, in Kankakee, Illinois
- KBZD Energy 99.7 Amarillo, Texas
- CHWE-FM Energy 106 in Winnipeg, Canada

=== Television channel ===
- Energy (TV channel), a Spanish TV channel owned by Mediaset España

== Place names ==
- Energy, Illinois, a village in the United States
- Energy, Mississippi, a settlement in the United States
- Energy, Missouri, a settlement in the United States
- Energy, Texas, a settlement in the United States

== Other uses ==
- Energy (Dubai Metro), a metro station on the Red Line in Dubai, UAE
- Energy (video gaming), a game mechanic in certain action, role-playing and mobile video games

== See also ==
- Conservation of energy
- Electric energy
- Energetic mood
- Energetics (disambiguation)
- Energeia, the general principle of "activity" as opposed to possibility, in Aristotelianism
- Energia (disambiguation)
- Energy development, the utilization of energy resources
- Energy distance, distances between statistical observations
- Energy industry, energy resources such as fuel and electricity
- Essence–energies distinction, a concept in Eastern Orthodox theology
- Food energy
- Forms of energy
- History of energy
- Negative energy
- Energie (disambiguation)
- NRG (disambiguation)
- Waste-to-energy
