= Energia =

Energia may refer to:

- Energia (corporation), or S. P. Korolev Rocket and Space Corporation Energia, a Russian design bureau and manufacturer
  - Energia (rocket), a Soviet rocket designed by the company
- Energia (company), a company that supplies gas and electricity in Northern Ireland and the Republic of Ireland
- Chugoku Electric Power Company, a Japanese electric utility which trades as EnerGia
- Energia (moth), a moth genus
- Energia (dev system), a fork/port of Arduino
- Energeia, the general principle of "activity" as opposed to possibility, in Aristotelianism
  - Essence-energies distinction – Theological concept central to Eastern Orthodoxy
- Energy, a physical quantity that describes the amount of work that can be performed by a force
- Energia TV, a television station based in Bonaire

== Entertainment ==
- Energia (band), a British band
- Energia (album), a 2016 album by Colombian singer J Balvin
- "Energia", a 2012 single by Mexican rock band Zoé
- Energia Kemerovo, a Russian ice hockey team from Kemerovo

== See also ==
- Energy (disambiguation)
- Energie (disambiguation)
- Enerhiya (disambiguation)
