= Nostalgie Wallonie =

Belgian radio station

- Brussels; Belgium
- Broadcast area: French Community of Belgium
- Frequencies: 100.0 MHz (Charleroi); 95.0 MHz (Liège); 100.0 MHz (Brussels); Full list of other frequencies on Nostalgie.be

Programming
- Language: French
- Format: Oldies

Ownership
- Owner: Corelio; NRJ Group
- Sister stations: Chérie FM Belgique (defunct); Nostalgie Flanders; NRJ Wallonie

History
- First air date: 1988

Links
- Website: nostalgie.be

Nostalgie Wallonie is a private Belgian radio station broadcasting in Wallonia and Brussels, and is dedicated to mainly French and American music of the 1960s, 1970s, 1980s and 1990s. Nostalgie Wallonia was created in Namur by the group Les Éditions de l'Avenir. It is owned by the NRJ Group and Corelio (previously Médiabel SA).

== History ==
In September 1983, Nostalgie starts broadcasting in France.

In 1987, the first broadcast of Nostalgie was in Brussels, then known as Radio Microclimat. But the official date of the appearance of Nostalgie in Wallonia was on 9 May 1989, when the French company Pro Public, bought the old SiS frequencies, whose bankruptcy was declared in 1988. The French manager of the company, who already broadcast Nostalgie in Lille, decided to implement the station in Belgium.

A year later in 1989, Pro Public disbanded, and the four frequencies of Nostalgie are bought by the NRJ Group.

On the night from 4 on 5 February 1993, Nostalgie starts broadcasting in Brussels on the frequency of the defunct station Top FM on 100.0 MHz, and is today still broadcasting there on this frequency.

In 2008, Nostalgie started broadcasting in Flanders as Nostalgie Vlaanderen. In 2023, the station changed its name to Play Nostalgie.

== Frequencies ==
Nostalgie Wallonie broadcasts on FM throughout Wallonia including Brussels, but can also be heard in parts of Flanders on the following frequencies:

=== Brussels ===
- Brussels: 100.0

=== Hainaut ===
- Anderlues: 107.0
- Ath: 107.1
- Binche: 106.7
- Braine-le-Comte: 107.5
- Charleroi: 100.0
- La Louvière: 89.2
- Mons: 107.5
- Mouscron: 100.7
- Tournai: 107.2

=== Liège ===
- Bassenge: 105.9
- Huy: 104.1
- Liège: 89.7 / 95.0
- Verviers: 92.3
- Waremme: 107.1

=== Luxembourg ===
- Arlon: 102.4
- Bastogne: 106.4
- Marche-en-Famenne: 107.9
- Neufchâteau: 107.0
- Saint-Hubert: 100.2
- Virton: 107.9

=== Namur ===
- Beauraing: 107.1
- Ciney: 106.9
- Couvin: 100.5
- Dinant: 100.7
- Gembloux: 107.4
- Namur: 100.4
- Sambreville: 87.8

=== Walloon Brabant ===
- Jodoigne: 95.1
- Nivelles: 87.9
- Perwez: 107.6
- Wavre: 105.1

== See also ==
- Nostalgie, the French radio station.
- Play Nostalgie, the Flemish radio station.
- NRJ Group, about the Group which owns NRJ and Nostalgie.
