= VRT Zendstation Egem =

Mast

Coordinates: 51°1′18.14″N 3°14′8.44″E

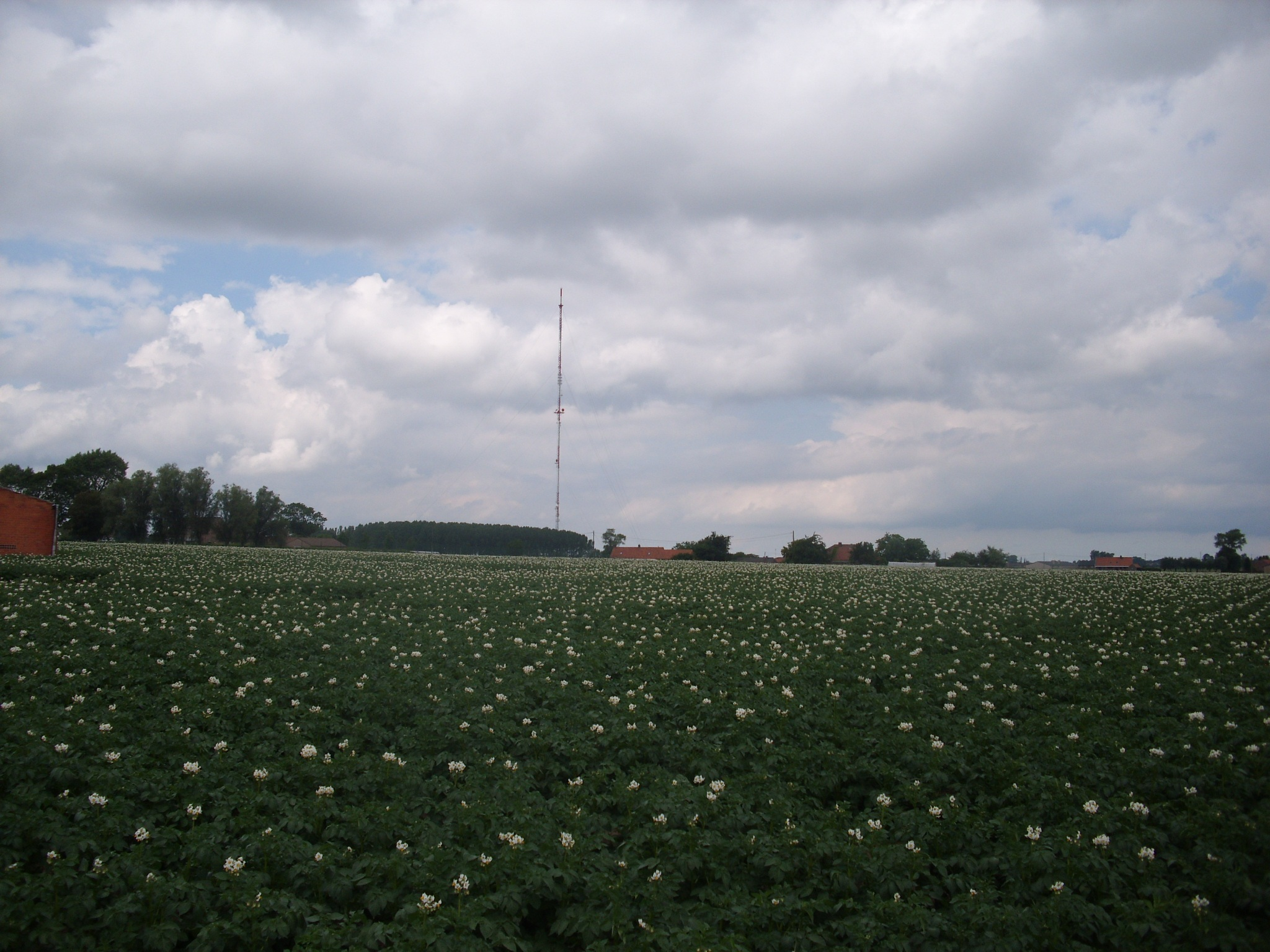
VRT Zendstation Egem in 2011

The VRT Zendstation Egem is a 305 metres (1,001 ft) tall guyed mast used as a broadcast antenna. It broadcasts the radio and TV programs of the VRT and Q-Music, JOE fm, and Nostalgie Vlaanderen. There are also a number of antennas for mobile communications (Base, Mobistar and Proximus) attached to the mast.

It was built in 1973 and is located in Egem in Pittem, West Flanders, Belgium. It was the tallest structure in Belgium, the Sint-Pieters-Leeuw Tower beats it with its 302 meters in height. Since 2008 the tower is owned and operated by Norkring België.

Radio services broadcast from the site (particularly those of the VRT) can be received in parts of neighbouring countries. Reception of the VRT services can regularly be received in the southern provinces of the Netherlands, Nord-Pas-de-Calais in Northern France and Kent in Southeast England.

== Services Broadcast ==
Analogue Radio (FM)

Frequency	kW	Service
90.4 MHz	50	VRT Klara
94.0 MHz	6.3	TOPradio
95.7 MHz	50	VRT Radio 1
98.2 MHz	16	Nostalgie Vlaanderen
98.6 MHz	50	VRT Radio 2 Oost-Vlaanderen
100.1 MHz	50	VRT Radio 2 West-Vlaanderen
101.5 MHz	40	VRT MNM
102.1 MHz	50	VRT StuBru
103.0 MHz	20	Qmusic
104.1 MHz	50	Joe

Digital Radio (DAB)

Block	Multiplex
5A	DAB+ Vlaanderen 2
11A	DAB+ Vlaanderen 1
