= Norkring =

Norwegian media broadcasting company

Norkring AS
- Company type: Subsidiary
- Industry: 9 , Broadcasting
- Founded: 1995
- Defunct: 27 January 2020
- Headquarters: Fornebu, Norway
- Number of employees: 150 (2017)
- Parent: Telenor
- Website: www.norkring.com

Norkring AS is a provider of digital terrestrial television and radio transmitting in Norway and Belgium. In Norway, Norkring operates a Digital Video Broadcasting – Terrestrial (DVB-T) network for Norges Televisjon, as well as an FM and Digital Audio Broadcasting (DAB) radio. In Belgium, Norkring operates a DVB-T, DVB-T2, FM, DAB and DAB+ network. It operated a DVB-T network in Slovenia between 2010 and 2012. Norkring is owned by Telenor; Norkring België is owned 75 percent by Norkring and 25 percent by Participatiemaatschappij Vlaanderen.

== History ==
=== Early radio broadcasting ===
The Norwegian Telegraphy Administration stated working on a radio broadcasting in 1922. After consulting other countries, it recommended that the government own and operate the transmission infrastructure. Norway abolished the ban on listening to foreign radio without a permit in 1923. At the same time a permit became necessary to operate a transmitter. Financing of broadcasting was based on a combination of advertisements, license fees for owning a radio and fee on purchasing a radio. Several companies allied in 1922 for permits to operate radio channels. To avoid similar problems as had occurred in the United States, the administration tried to limited manufacturers of radios from also owning the channels.

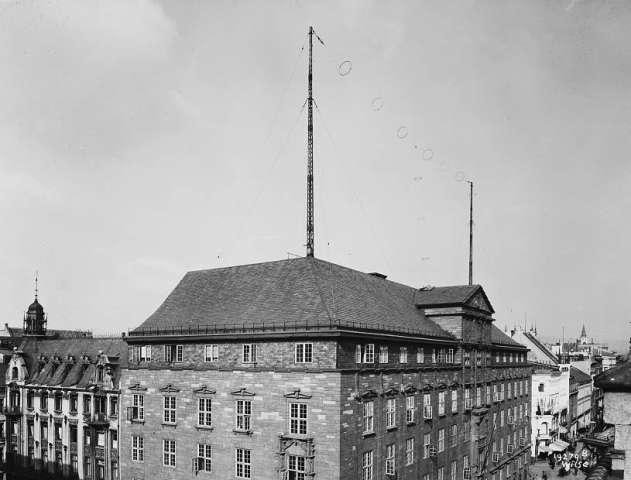
Kringkastingsselskapet's offices and first transmitter

Kringkastingsselskapet ("The Broadcasting Company") was granted the first permit in 1924. It had more than 2000 shareholders, with major parts owned by Marconi Company, Telefunken and Western Electric. It had a permit to operate a transmitter in Oslo with a reach of 150 kilometers (93 mi). It was owned by Kringkastingsselskapet, but operated by the Telegraphy Administration. An additional five transmitters were built in Eastern Norway during the 1920s. These included Rjukan in 1925, Notodden and Porsgrunn in 1926 and Hamar and Fredrikstad in 1927. Norway was allocated three AM broadcasting frequencies in 1926. Other radio channels were established in Bergen in 1925, Tromsø in 1926 and Ålesund in 1927.

Kringkastingselskapet received permissions to operate in most of the country from 1928. A scandal hit the broadcasting company in 1929, in which a new transmitter at Lambertseter in Oslo had insufficient power, and secondly following the discovery of management enriching themselves. The former was caused by the Telegraphy Administration's not fully understanding the effects of radio transmission during design, and under-dimensioning the transmitter. The issue was resolved when the manufacturer, Telefunken, took the cost of converting it from medium wave to shortwave. New transmitters were installed in Kristiansand, Stavanger, Trondheim in 1930, Bodø in 1931, Narvik in 1934, and Vigra in 1935.

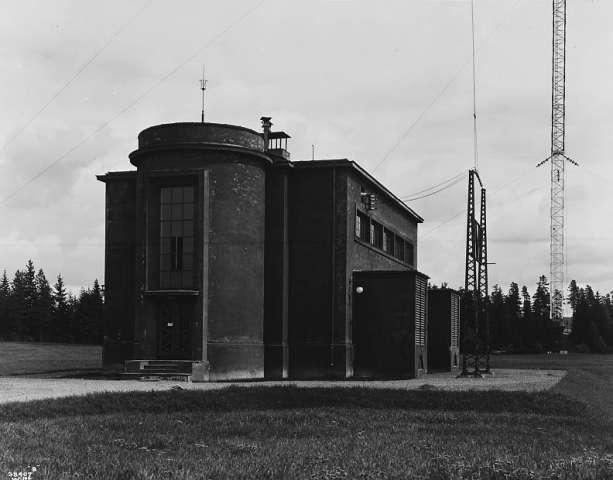
Lambertseter Transmitter in 1931

The scandal resulted in a proposal for a new organization of the broadcasting. At first Minister of Trade and Industry Lars Oftedal proposed a model whereby the transmission would be the responsibility of the Telegraphy Administration, and a new, private program company would be established, owned by the Oslo newspapers. This was opposed by Minister of Education and Church Affairs Sigvald Hasund did not want the sensation-oriented capital press from controlling the radio and wanted the government to have control. Mowinckel's Second Cabinet's successor in 1931, Kolstad's Cabinet, supported Hasund's line and proposed in 1932 that the government take responsibility for content. By the time the issue was being voted over by Parliament, Mowinckel's Third Cabinet was in place, proposing that the budgetary responsibility lie with the broadcasting company, not the Telegraphy Administration. The Norwegian Broadcasting Corporation was established in 1933 as a government-owned, national broadcaster.

NRK received the ownership of transmitter and studios, while the Telegraphy Administration was to be responsible for technical operations. The latter took over all responsibility for technical equipment at NRK from 1936, in an attempt to rationalize operations. However, it resulted in a reduced holistic control over NRK, and the arrangement was abandoned in 1950, when all technical aspects except transmission were transferred to NRK. A plan from 1930 called for a national network of 43 transmitter, which would be installed in three phases. The plans were by 1935 reduced to 19 transmitters. From 1933 to 1940, NRK invested 5 million Norwegian krone in transmitters. Only one additional major transmitter, in Narvik, was completed. The strategy was in part caused by low growth estimates and prioritizing constructing a broadcasting center at Marienlyst in Oslo. Estimates from 1939 indicated that 1.5 million Norwegian had stable reception of radio, about half the population.

As a countermeasure against what was at the time characterized as the "Finnish danger", and to reach out to the Sami and Kven population with Norwegian language and culture, a transmitter was established in Vardø in 1934. Until 1935, programs from Oslo to other transmitters was conducted through a regular telephone line. Pre-made programs were tested distributed using gramophone records in 1934, but the quality proved too low. Shortwave radio transmission were tested the same year, but proved no higher quality.

The following year the Telegraphy Administration introduced high frequency transmission lines between Oslo and the radio transmitters. This was in part financed through a NOK 2-million grant from the state and NOK 230,000 in annual subscription fees. NRK protested the decision, citing that the Telegraphy Administration was dictating the conditions. The initial line, which ran northwards to Vadsø, opened in 1934. Then lines were built to Ålesund, Bergen and via Kristiansand to Stavanger, the last opening three years later. The transmission lines were completed in 1937 and remained in use for 30 years. Their main downside was that they could not transmit in both directions simultaneously, which contributed to Oslo becoming the center of production. If content was to be transmitted from other locations, technicians would have to "turn" the line receivers. This was keyed by the radio operators announcing "the national program will continue from..." and from the 1950s "over to...", in which the program would pause for ten seconds for the technicians to reconfigure.

During the German occupation of Norway during World War II (1940–45), Nasjonal Samling (NS) and the German authorities took control over NRK. An independent part of NRK was set up in London and offered an alternative broadcasting. Both NRK London and the British Broadcasting Corporation became important radio channels. From August 1941 the occupational forces demanded that all NS members surrender their radios. Only 110,000 of 538,000 confiscated radios were returned to their owners, resulting in a massive production of new radios. This and increased penetration resulted in NRK having very high income in the late 1940s and 1950s, allowing them to take high risk. This was in contrast to the Telegraphy Administration, which was highly restricted on funding and wished to minimize risk. By the early 1950s, 93 percent of the population had access to radio—twice the penetration of telephones. This was due to a higher political support in building broadcasting infrastructure combined with lower investment costs. In the late 1940s NRK used large resources in building a shortwave sender in Fredrikstad which could reach Norwegian abroad and especially seamen.

=== FM and monochrome television ===
The period between 1945 and 1970 was dominated by a strategic disagreement between NRK and the Telegraphy Administration. In 1941, NS moved the responsibility for the technical part of programming to NRK. After the war there was initially consensus to reverse the decision, but NRK and Minister Kaare Fostervoll decided to support the new arrangement. A government committee agreed with Fostervoll, as did Parliament, and the transition was completed in 1950. NRK captured many of the Telegraphy Administration's younger engineers, which reinforced the tendencies for an innovative NRK and a conservative Telegraphy Administration.

NRK started planning television broadcasts in 1950. It selected the internationally recommended 625 lines. A commission led by Olaf Moe considered three transmission techniques: physical distribution of film, coaxial cables and microwave radio relay. Coaxial was tested with the construction of a line from Oslo which from completed to Gjøvik in 1953 and to Bergen in 1957. The military opened a relay between Eastern Norway and Bergen in 1954 with 24 telephone lines. However, the Telegraphy Administration initially remained skeptical to the technology.

In the end relays were regarded as the only realistic approach, although it would still incur large investments. A joint network, which could support television in the evenings and telephones during the day, was proposed, but disregarded by the Telegraphy Administration, stating the high costs. Parliament approved trial broadcasting in 1953 for two year, despite protests from the Telegraphy Administration. Starting on 12 January 1954, these were only sent from a transmitter in Oslo and were not announced. They were terminated in 1956.

The Copenhagen Frequency Plan of 1948 resulted in Norway only being allocated one medium wave and one long wave frequency. The audio quality diminished as Norwegian transmitters were forced to share frequencies with foreign channels. This could be overcome by installing a network of FM broadcasting transmitters. The Telegraphy Administration rejected FM, stating that this would require the entire country to buy new radios. A 1949 plan proposed a new long wave transmitter at Kløfta and a national network of medium wave transmitters. NRK accepted the transmitter at Kløfta, but rejected the medium wave transmitters. As twenty percent of the population lacked acceptable radio coverage, NRK decided in 1953 to build FM transmitters in Western Norway and Agder to reach these areas. An advantage of building FM transmitters was that they could be co-located with television transmitters, reducing the roll-out costs.

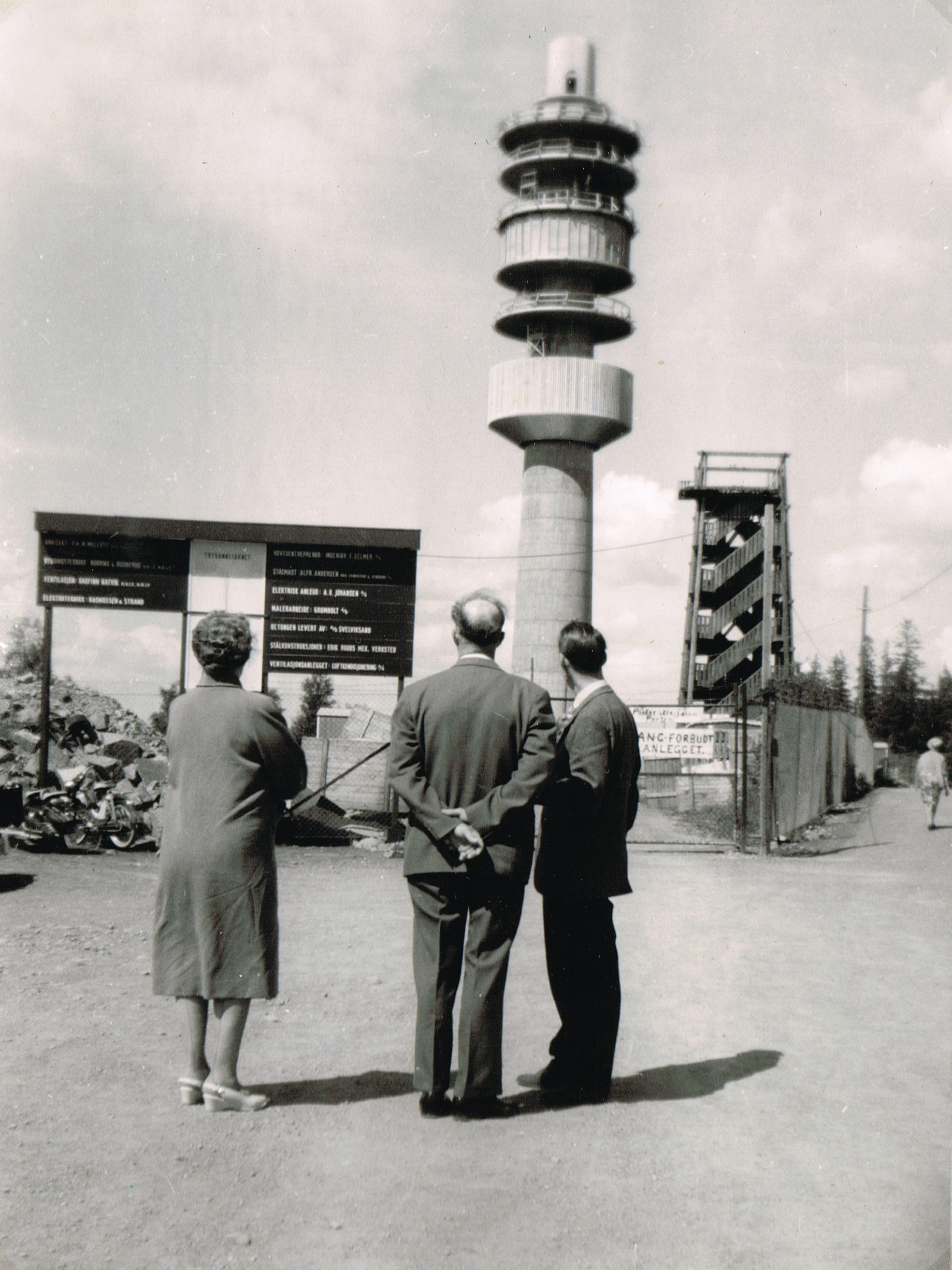
During construction of Tryvannstårnet in Oslo in 1961

NRK therefore proposed moving the long wave transmitter from Kløfta to Western Norway and build an FM network in Eastern Norway. Telegraphy Director Sverre Rynning-Tønnesen stated that it was imperative to "cling to the past" and rejected this. By 1955 the Telegraphy proposed that the radio network be established using 26 FM transmitters. One on top of Gaustatoppen would cover central Eastern Norway while the rest would be built in areas without acceptable AM coverage. Transmission to the FM transmitters would be carried out using telephone lines. Construction of the FM and television transmission network was estimated to take ten to fifteen years. NRK rejected the plan, both because of the long time frame and because they wanted to prioritize Eastern Norway and Trøndelag, which had the most concentrated populations. The Telegraphy Administration also proposed that cable radio be installed, in part because it would accelerate the construction of the telephone network. Cable radio was installed in Setesdal, Rana, and Sulitjelma.

Parliament decided in 1957 that a national television network should be built. The main concern was transmission lines to the terrestrial transmitters. Using telephone lines required 300 lines. The Norwegian Defence Research Establishment and Nera developed technology which made this possible. NATO had financed a radio link network for the military, which the latter had offered NRK to use. This was largely used as a bargaining chip to either crate acceptance for the plan within the Telegraphy Administration, or allow NRK to take control over the construction of the transmission system. The tactics worked and the Telegraphy Administration accepted in February 1957 the construction of a television network.

Construction of a television network started with a microwave radio relay in the super high frequency band. The backbone of the system was a two-way 960 telephone channel, a one-way television channel network and additional communications lines in a third channel in Southern Norway. These lines could be rerouted if one of the relay stations fell out. It was supplemented with a redundant 300 telephone channel network. The relay network largely used the same masts as were used for television transmission, which was why the Telegraphy Administration was chosen instead of NRK. The 1957 plan called for seventy to eighty percent of the population having television coverage within twelve years. This was budgeted to cost NOK 70 million, consisting of 28 transmitters and 19 frequency converters. The FM network would be built in parallel, with 37 transmitters and 10 frequency converters.

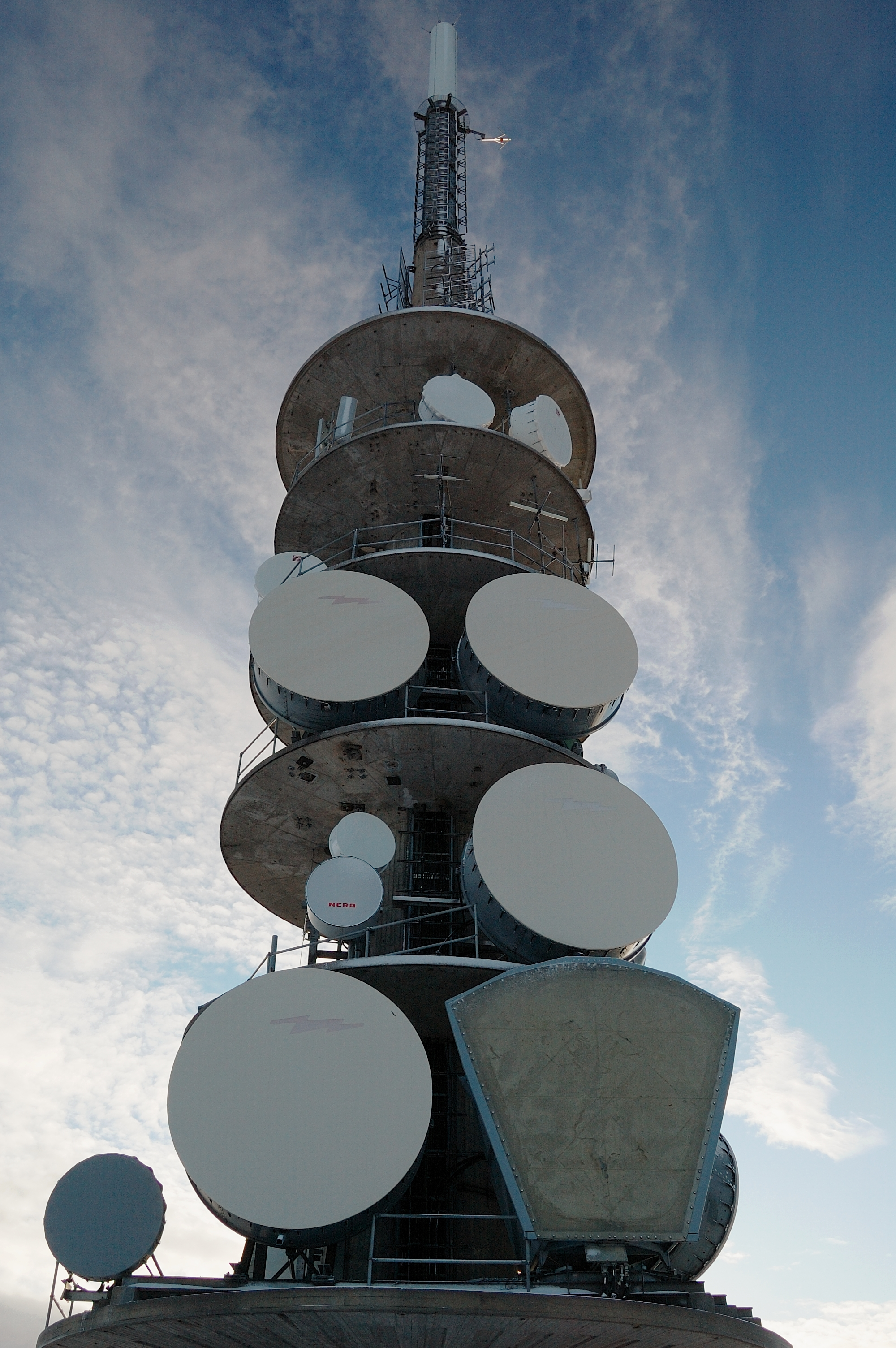
The relay and transmission tower on Ulriken, Bergen

The relay network opened between 1960 and 1968 and covered the segments Oslo–Bergen, the coast from Oslo via Kristiansund, Bergen, Stavanger and Ålesund to Trondheim, and from Oslo via Trondheim north to Kirkenes. NRK had to its disposition four 15-kHz mono analog program channels. The government accelerated construction of transmitters in 1966, and by 1971 seventy-nine percent of the population had access to television coverage. In 1970 the network consisted of 39 main television transmitters and 266 smaller transmitters and frequency converters. The FM network consisted of 36 main transmitters and 126 smaller transmitters and frequency converters. The investments cost NOK 200 million—the increase caused by a combination of inflation and under-budgeting. The operational costs remained at the budgeted levels.

=== Color television and liberalization ===
During the 1960s, NRK actively removed the color information on programs sent via the European Broadcasting Union. This was abolished after order of the Ministry of Education and Church Affairs ahead of the 1968 Winter Olympics. The decision to start color broadcasting was taken by Parliament on 9 December 1970. The 1971 Nobel Peace Prize ceremony was filmed in color, and while it sent to Eurovision in color, it was broadcast domestically in monochrome. The first domestic color broadcast took place on 1 January 1972.

The addition of regional offices and resulted in the microwave radio relay being upgraded in the 1970s. The Telecommunications Administration insisted on continuing using analog transmission, while NRK instead wanted to implement a digital transmission. NRK got its way, and a transistor-based system with a capacity corresponding to 960 telephone lines was installed. The resulting system had two radio channels, one for transmitting radio from Oslo to the regional offices and one for transmission between the regional offices. The FM transmitters were fed their programs from the regional offices. The system had a two-way television channel, which could feed the television programs to the transmitters and allow for transfer of program content from the regional offices to Oslo. The sound transfer system had four 2-megabit channels; the one was used for 30 telephone lines and the other was used for 5 program channels. These had a sampling rate of 32 kHz and a 14-bit bit rate, which was reduced to 11 through compression. No other available systems could produce this quality of audio.

Telenor announced in 2004 that it was considering selling its broadcasting division, which in addition to Norkring consists of Canal Digital, Conex and Telenor Satellite Broadcasting. The division was valued at NOK 9.7 billion. Førde Municipality claimed property taxes for the transmitter on Hafstadfjellet. The case ended in Fjordane District Court, which found in 2005 that Norkring was not liable to pay property tax.

=== Digitization ===
Norway was allocated DAB frequencies in 1995, allowing digital radio broadcasting to start. The frequencies were divided between a national multiplex, regional multiplexes and local multiplexes. Test broadcasting by NRK and P4 was carried out and NRK launched the world's first DAB-only radio channel, NRK Alltid Klassisk. The following year the government stated that it was not the government's responsibility to build a digital radio broadcasting network and stated that this would have to be carried out by the radio channels.

NRK, the TV 2 Group and Telenor started in 2001 negotiating establishing a digital terrestrial television network. Telenor withdrew and NRK and TV 2 established Norges Televisjon in 2002. The government invited to a tender for a concession for a DVB-T network in 2002. Norkring estimated in 2003 that it would cost NOK 1 billion in investments over a period of 15 years to keep the analog television network running, which would limit transmission to four channels. NTV was the only applicant for the concession, but the tender was re-issued in 2005, after NTV wanted to extend its duration from 12 to 15 years. In the second tender, Telenor also applied. Thus the two companies agreed to collaborate and Telenor was invited as a joint owner of NTV, which in the end was the only applicant.

Political support of the terrestrial digital television network was controversial. Opponents stated that the frequencies would be better applied to providing wireless broadband; however as most other countries use these frequencies for television, little consumer equipment would have support for such use. Proponents stated that a digital television network would be the easiest way to carry out the digital television transition and that it would allow the population to receive NRK without having go have an agreement with a commercial company. The long political precessing time resulted in that MPEG-4 could be used for compression, allowing for more channels and better quality, and that all home boxes can support high definition.

The first areas received DVB-T coverage in 2007. When the analog shut-down took place in late 2009, these frequencies were freed up and used for two additional multiplexes for digital television. At the same time TV 2 went from being a free-to-air to an encrypted pay television channel. Because of late implementation, RiksTV received a significantly lower penetration than estimated, as cable and satellite television had largely captured the market for viewers willing to pay for television. Installation of the network cost NOK 2 billion.

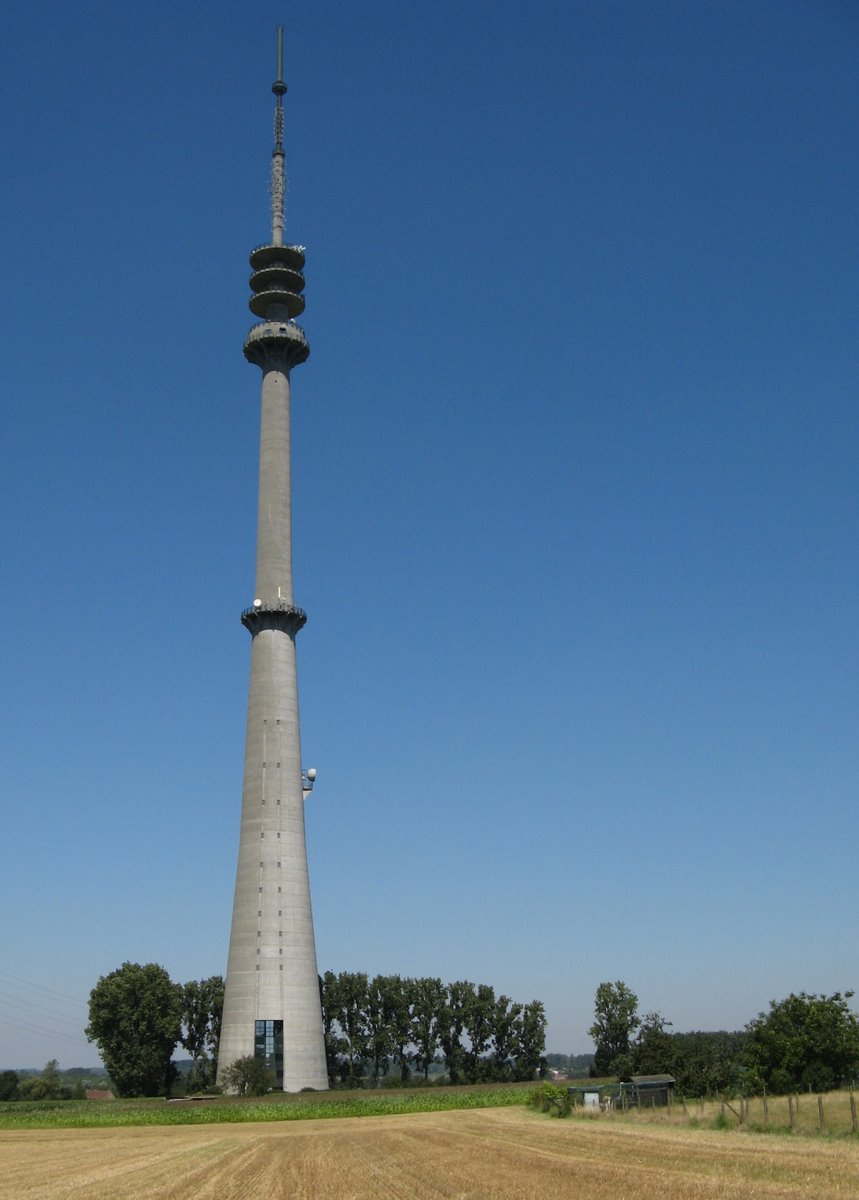
Norkring België owns the 300-meter (980 ft) Sint-Pieters-Leeuw Tower near Brussels

As the digitization of television in Norway reached completion, Norkring started looking for international work. Norkring bought the Belgian Flemish national broadcaster Vlaamse Radio- en Televisieomroeporganisatie (VRT)'s terrestrial broadcasting network in 2008. The purchase included one multiplex, which was used to transmit VRT's channels. The following year Norkring België was awarded the right for four additional multiplexes, of which one is for mobile television, and a digital radio license. The license was awarded following a beauty contest at the Belgian Institute for Postal Services and Telecommunications. The authority's main concern was to avoid vertical integration which could hamper competition and it did not want an existing program company or operator of a cable or satellite distribution company to operate the terrestrial network. The other contender in the contest was the French TDF Group.

Norkring was awarded a ten-year concession to operate Multiplex B (Mux B) in Slovenia by the Agency for Post and Electronic Communications on 19 December 2008. Radiotelevizija Slovenija (RTV) operated Multiplex A (Mux A). The permit stipulated that Mux A would only be used for RTV's own channels and that commercial operators would have to use Mux B. Because Mux A became operational before Mux B, RTV was permitted to temporarily provide channels in their multiplex. Regular operations with Mux B started on 1 September 2010 and the analog turn-off took place on 1 December. Initially Pink SI was the only channel to switch to Mux B, although TV3 followed in October. Pink SI switched back to Mux A in 2011, which also hosted the commercial channels Pop TV and Kanal A. Norkring issued a criminal complaint to the Commission for the Prevention of Corruption of the Republic of Slovenia, claiming RTV was violating regulatory decisions through hosting commercial channels, arguing that European Union law prohibits commercial channels from being broadcast on national multiplexes. RTV stated that they were obliged to charge the commercial channels for the use of their multiplex.

As of 2010 Norkring stated that they were interested in entering the market in Wallonia, Belgium, and Poland. The Vigra Transmitter was closed in 2011 and Røst followed the following year, leaving Ingøy as the only AM transmitter in Norway. The Parliament of Norway decided in 2011 that the FM network would be closed in 2017 or 2019, with full coverage being ready in 2014. The only parliamentary party to oppose the transition was the Progress Party. The decision resulted in a large-scale expansion of the DAB network in Norway. NRK stated that the longer overlap period, compared to that of television, would give significantly higher broadcasting costs. Following the closure of TV3 in February 2012 and as all other channels were being broadcast on Multiplex A, Norkring decided to close its Slovenian network. Norkring was awarded the second DAB multiplex in an auction held by the Norwegian Post and Telecommunications Authority in 2012, where the company bid NOK 4 million. The multiplex has a capacity for fifteen DAB+ channels.

== Network ==
=== Norway ===
Norkring AS is a wholly owned subsidiary of Telenor. Except for local radio stations, the company is the only terrestrial broadcaster of television in Norway. Norkring's Norwegian technical center and offices are located at Fornebu. The broadcasting services are under the regulation of the Norwegian Media Authority and the Norwegian Post and Telecommunications Authority.

The DVB-T network is owned by Norges Televisjon, who also hold the concession from 2007 to 2022. They have subcontracted the construction and operation of the network to Norkring. The network is based on DVB-T transmission with MPEG-4 encoding, using five multiplexes. Each multiplex gives a capacity of 20 megabits of content distribution. The television network covers 95 percent of the population; the rest must have access to satellite television. It is transmitted using 430 transmitters, of which there are 42 main transmitters. NTV is required to cover 5,200 homes (0.25 percent) which are in the satellite shadow—meaning they do not have access to cable or satellite because of typographical hindrances. Six hundred repeaters are installed to serve the shadow areas, many of which only relay NRK's channels. All channels are assembled in Oslo and then sent by fiber to the transmitters, possibly with the addition of local channels. Replays receive their signals from transmitters within range.

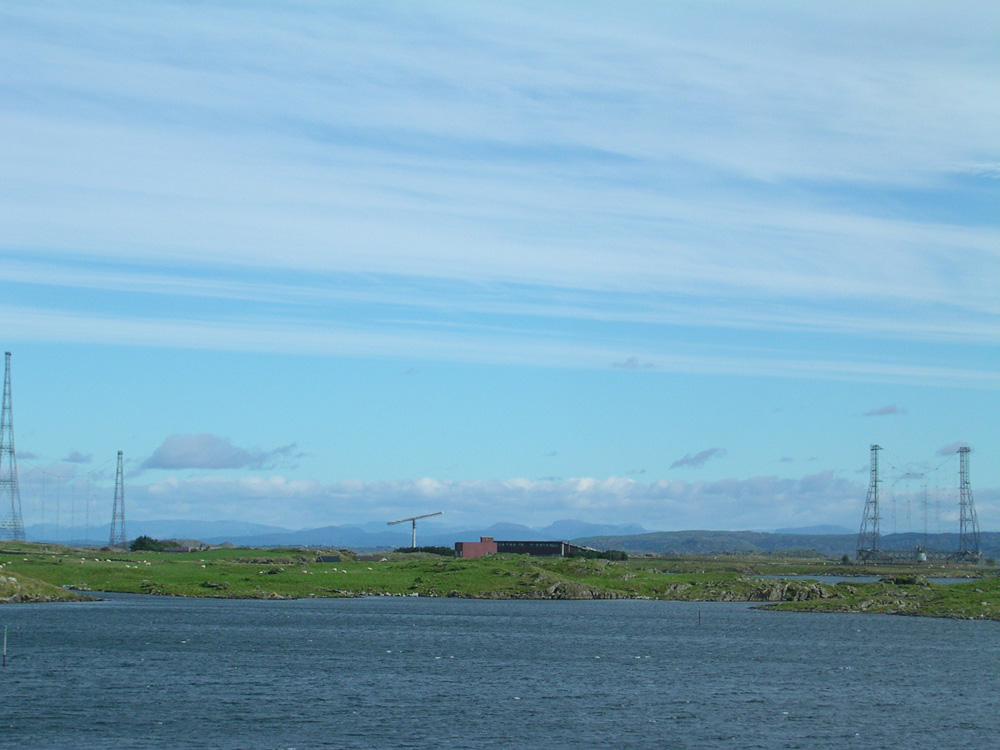
Kvitsøy is Norway's only shortwave transmitter

FM and DAB transmitters are operated by Norkring throughout the country. The concession for two national DAB multiplexes are held by Norkring, while the regional blocks are owned by NRK, but the infrastructure is owned and operated by Norkring. The FM network is created through 1,700 transmitters, which give a 99.5-percent coverage for P1 and significantly less for all other stations. The FM network includes support for Radio Data System. The only AM transmitter still in use is at Ingøy, which broadcasts NRK P1 to the fishing fleet in the Barents Sea. Kvitsøy remains the only shortwave transmitter, broadcasting Polish Radio External Service and Radio Romania International. As of 2010, NRK broadcasts P1, P2, P3, mP3, Alltid Nyheter, Alltid Klassisk and Sápmi on both DAB and FM. Super, Gull, Jazz, Klassisk, Folkemusikk, Båtvær is broadcast only on DAB. The commercial national stations P4 and Radio Norge and the local stations P5, Radio Norge, NRJ, The Voice are broadcast on both DAB and FM.

The regional DAB block is scheduled to have a 99.89-percent population penetration by 2014, corresponding to FM coverage of P1. The high penetration is required because P1 acts as an emergency broadcast station. The commercial National Block I will by then have a 90-percent penetration. This will require a network of between 650 and 1000 transmitters and relays, including 42 main transmitters. When all allocated multiplexes have been built out, there can be offered seventy national radio channels, presuming a mix of music and voice channels and all using DAB+. Parliament has decided to close the FM network in 2017 or 2019, depending on the penetration of digital radio use in 2015. This will make Norway the first country to have an all-digital distribution network for national, terrestrial radio. Local radio channels will be permitted to continue broadcasting on FM. The issue of which stations may continue to use FM and which may broadcast in DAB will be decided in 2015.

=== Belgium ===
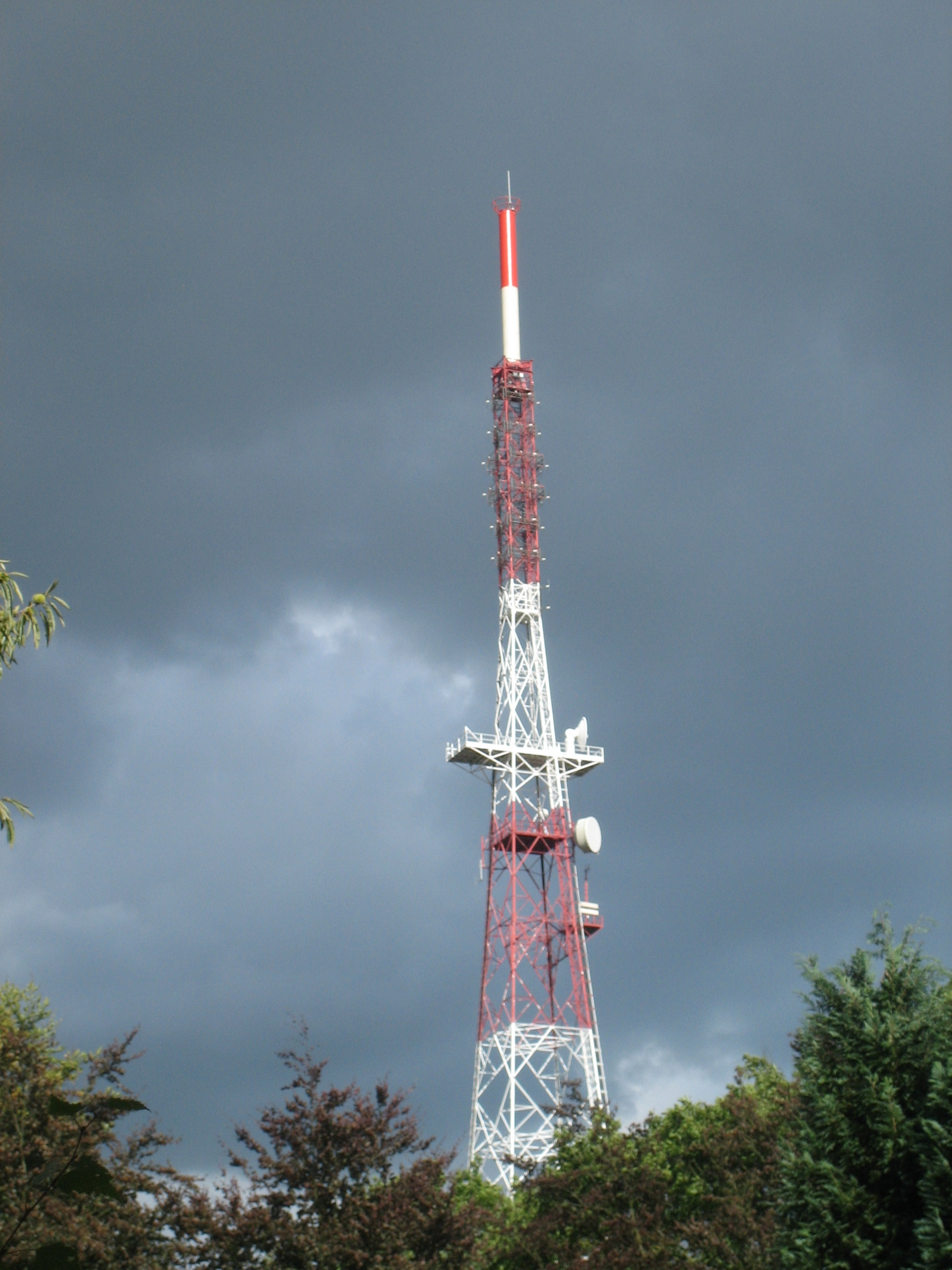
Transmitter in Schoten, Belgium

Norkring België is owned by Cordiant following the sale of the asset by Telenor and Participatiemaatschappij Vlaanderen (PMV) in 2024. Norkring België operates 24 transmitter sites for FM, DAB, DAB+, DVB-T and DVB-T2 in Flanders and Brussels, of which ten are located on their own masts. These consist of self-supporting masts in Schoten, Oostvleteren and Genk, guyed masts in Egem and Veltem, a mast on an office building in Brussels and concrete masts in Sint-Pieters-Leeuw, Attenrode Wever and Brussegem. In addition to the DVB-T network, Norkring offers co-location of other antennas on eight masts. The company's technical headquarters are located at Sint-Pieters-Leeuw. The services are under the regulation of the Belgian Institute for Postal Services and Telecommunications.

DVB-T and DVB-T2 Broadcasting consists of three free-to-air channels: Eén, Canvas and Ketnet, all provided by the public VRT. In addition, DVB-T broadcasting is provided as pay television on an agreement with Telenet. The later also broadcasts Vijf, Vier, Acht, National Geographic Channel, MTV, Kanaal Z, Nickelodeon, Njam!, Studio 100 and MENT TV. VRT and Telenet each pay €10 million per year for the broadcasting.

=== Slovenia ===
Between 1 September 2010 and March 2012, Norkring d.o.o, a wholly owned subsidiary of Norkring AS, operated one of two multiplexes in Slovenia. The network consisted of 26 transmitters and covered 90 percent of the population. It was one of two multiplexes operating in the market and saw two channels chose them: Pink SI and TV 3. The network was under the regulation of the Agency for Post and Electronic Communications.
