= Energy (event) =

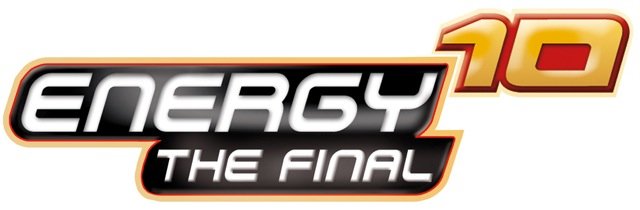
- Logo of the 2010 Energy event, Energy 10 The Final. Note this was not the final Energy event.
- Genre: Electro; Techno; Trance; House; Hardcore
- Dates: 10.08.2013
- Locations: Hallenstadion, Club OXA & Sensor Club (1993-2003, 2008-2011); Eventhalle 550 (2004); Maag-Arena (2006-2007); Zürich, Switzerland
- Years active: 1992–2013
- Website: www.energyparty.ch

Energy was a techno-music event (see rave) taking place after the Street Parade in Zürich, Switzerland. It is considered the largest indoor event of its nature in the country. In 2010, around 14,000 people attended.

== History ==
Hosted by Music journalist Arnold Meyer, Event Mastermind Gregory Fauchart a.k.a. DJ T-Bass, Fifa event organiser Hans-Jürg Rufener and record label owner Thomas Bischofberger, Energy began as a party after the first Street Parade in 1992 in what was an industrial warehouse. Originally, Energy attracted more visitors than the Street Parade itself until 1994, when the parade sharply gained popularity due to the nation- and world-wide word-of-mouth of the Energy after-party. Hallenstadion in Zürich replaced the warehouse as the Energy venue from 1993-2003.

As one of the first events of its kind in Europe it attracted thousands of tourists from Italy, Germany, France, Belgium, The Netherlands, Austria and others. Likewise, Energy parties arose in these countries in large clubs. Since 2001 an Energy ticket also encompassed other clubs and locations in Zürich, promoting a more diverse event.

=== NRJ lawsuit ===
The organizers of Energy faced a lawsuit against the French NRJ Radio in 2003 due to the planned launch of a radio station, NRJ/Energy Zürich. The Zürich supreme court ruled in favor of the Energy Rave promoter Zürich, then both parties found an arrangement; radio ENERGY/NRJ bought the company from the Energy rave promoter containing the registered "energy" trade mark in Switzerland. In the same time a licence agreement between both parties allowed to continuation of the party.

=== Changing venues and popularity ===
Hallenstadion underwent construction in 2004 causing the event to be moved to Eventhalle 550 in Oerlikon. Thereafter, business decisions led to the event being moved to the much smaller Maag-Arena in Zürich's fifth district in 2006 and 2007; the original rave-concept seemed to fade. Nevertheless, in 2008 the event managed to make a comeback including a fresher commercial concept involving international artists. It returned to Hallenstadion, where with the help of long-term contracts, the event continued until 2010.

Today the event is managed by Glamourama GmbH in Zürich, wherein two original organizers participate.

== Music ==
Since 1992 almost every important artist in the techno- and house-scene has played at Energy; a total of over 1000 DJs. In Hallenstadion the leading genre is performed in the main arena, surrounded by several other 'floors' which focus on various music styles. Until 2007, trance was perceived as the dominant genre with which Energy gained popularity. Since 2008, electro, techno, and house music have been incorporated more into the main arena program and trance has taken a more subtle part in these surrounding floors.

=== Importance in the Swiss techno scene ===
Due to its popularity and widespread reputation in Europe, early-starting DJs have had opportunities to perform at the event and thus find their way into a professional DJ career (see DJ Energy on German-language Wikipedia).

== The Future of Energy ==
In September 2010, the homepage of the event stated that it would be back in 2011 "with a different and renewed Energy party concept". Energy has since confirmed that it will continue the event as Energy 2011 - The Comeback! on August 13, 2011, in the Hallenstadion. The website hints towards the popularity and success of the party being the cause for another "go-ahead" of Energy.

Energy 13 was the last party of the series, taking place on Saturday 10 August 2013 in Hallenstadion, with headliner David Guetta and special guest DJ Tatana.
