= Nostalgie =

Coordinates: 48.8459°N 2.2643°E

- France
- Broadcast area: France
- Frequencies: 90.4 MHz (Paris); 96.0 MHz (Marseille); 92.9 MHz (Lyon); 88.1 MHz (Lebanon)

Programming
- Format: Classic hits

Ownership
- Owner: NRJ Group

History
- First air date: 16 September 1983; 42 years ago

Links
- Website: www.nostalgie.fr

Nostalgie is a popular French radio station broadcasting on FM, mostly playing pre-2000s songs with 76% of them coming from the 1980s. Nostalgie is part of the NRJ Group.

== History ==
Radio Nostalgie, now simply Nostalgie, was created on 16 September 1983. Since 1985 Radio Nostalgie was developing a network in France and in 1986 the station was also broadcasting in Paris.

Also at this time, Radio Nostalgie was already developing abroad in countries such as Belgium, Lebanon, Portugal and Russia (Moscow). And later continued its expansion in Eastern Europe, the Balearic Islands (Spain), the Americas, and more recently in Africa: Côte d'Ivoire (Abidjan), Senegal (Dakar) and Togo (Lomé).

Towards 1987/1988, the life of the station was marked by the diffusion of popular and rare songs from the 50s to the 80s with news and some significant programs:

- "Les matinales" "The Mornings" (Denis Rostagnat, weekly, 5 am-9 am).
- "La salle et la terrasse" "The room and the terrace" (weekly, 12 am-2 pm).
- "Le club" (Program with mainly songs of the 60s hosted by Bruno Dubois) weekly, 5 pm-7 pm).
- "Piano Bar" (Pierre Galibert, Saturdays 9 pm-1 am).
- "Les nuits de Nostalgie" "The Nights of Nostalgie" (Pascal Moréno, weekly, 1 am-5 am).

In 1997, the group Générale Occidentale entered at 49% in the share capital, RMC retaining the remaining 51%. Nostalgie focused towards a younger format by broadcasting songs of the 1980s and entertainment programs by well-known hosts (Pierre Bellemare, Georges Beller, Lio, Pierre Galibert, etc.). The audience was crumbling dangerously.

On 10 April 1997, the radio station started broadcasting its own TV station, Nostalgie la télé. It was owned by the AB Groupe who had agreed to broadcast under this name. However, the channel failed, and was replaced in the summer of 1999 by RFM TV.

At the outbreak of the RMC Group, Radio Nostalgie, as well as RMC and Montmartre FM, were put up for sale. NRJ Group was a candidate, and the CSA authorizes repurchase. Following virulent protests from the independent local radio, saying the NRJ group would monopoly on local advertising market with its four networks (NRJ, Chérie FM and Rire & Chansons and Nostalgie): they indeed feared too much pressure from advertisers with attractive offers. The CSA then imposes conditions on the NRJ Group to reduce the monopoly : Rire & Chansons becomes 100% passive (closing local stations, which also contradicted terms of the CSA's own, which erect at the birth of Rire & Chansons) and some other local stations of the NRJ group will stop broadcasting in some cities where NRJ is strongly present.

Within a few months, the audience of Radio Nostalgie exploded: whereas previously the highest scores were in the range of only 6% of total audience, Nostalgie quickly exceeded 8%. The simultaneous start of Christophe Sabot (Director of Programming) and Jean-Marc Morandini (Director of Nostalgie) did not affect the score.

== Main slogan ==
In 1996 a new slogan was introduced: La légende, and later became the main slogan, as it was always present on the logo between 1996 and February 2013.

- 1996 - February 2013 : La Légende

== International affiliates ==
Nostalgie has many international affiliates under the same name in the following countries :

- Belgium
  - Flanders (Play Nostalgie)
  - Wallonia (Nostalgie Wallonie)
- Eastern Europe
- Northern Europe
- Germany
- The Netherlands
- Guadeloupe (Nostalgie Guadeloupe)
- Guinea (Nostalgie Guinée)
- French Guiana (Nostalgie Guyane)
- Ivory Coast (Nostalgie Côte d'Ivoire)
- Lebanon (Nostalgie Liban 88.1)
- Martinique (Nostalgie Martinique)
- Portugal (Rádio Nostalgia)
- Réunion (Nostalgie Réunion 97,4)
- Senegal (Nostalgie Dakar 90.3)
- Togo (Nostalgie Lomé)

== Web-radios ==
Nostalgie currently has 56 web-radios in various musical genres, to listen the webradios or know more about the web-radios see the reference:

== Slogans ==
- From 1983 till 1992: Un amour de radio (A love of station)
- From 1992 till 1993: La radio pour charger d'airs (The station for changing the air)
- From 1993 till 1996: C'est pour toujours (This is for always)
- From 1997 till 1999: Le bonheur c'est ici (The happiness is here)
- From 1998 to 2009: La Légende (The legend)
- From 2009 till 2012: La Jeunesse est éternelle (The youth is eternal)
- From 2012 till 2013: La Légende des annés 60, 70 et 80 ! (The legend of the 60s, 70s and 80s!)
- From 2013 till 2014: Les chansons de vos légendes ! (Songs of your legends)
- From 2014 till 2022: Les plus grandes chansons (The biggest songs)
- From 2022 till 2026: Les plus grands tubes (The greatest hits)
- Since 2026: Tous les Tubes 80 ! (All the 80s Hits!)

== See also ==
- Nostalgia (disambiguation)
- Play Nostalgie
- Nostalgie Wallonie
- NRJ Group
