= Nostalgic (disambiguation) =

Nostalgic is the characteristic of having or feeling nostalgia.

Nostalgic may also refer to:

- "Nostalgic" (song), a 2015 song by Kelly Clarkson
- "Nostalgic", a 2016 song by Simple Plan from Taking One for the Team
- "Nostalgic", a 2019 song by Arizona
