= Nostalgic (song) =

Song by Kelly Clarkson

from the album Piece by Piece
- Released: 2015
- Recorded: 2013
- Studio: The Dressing Room (Nashville, TN); The Listening Station (Nashville, TN)
- Genre: Synthpop; electronic rock
- Length: 3:37
- Label: RCA
- Songwriters: Justin Tranter; Ryland Blackinton; Dan Keyes; Vaughn Oliver
- Producer: Jason Halbert

"Nostalgic" is a song by American singer Kelly Clarkson from her seventh studio album, Piece by Piece (2015). Produced by former DC Talk member Jason Halbert, the song was written by artists who also have been members of various rock bands: Semi Precious Weapons lead singer Justin Tranter, former Cobra Starship lead guitarist Ryland Blackinton, Young Love lead singer Dan Keyes, and Oliver duo member Vaughn Oliver. A synth electro rock song, it sings of remembering nostalgia of a failed relationship, which was mainly based on Tranter's and Keyes's real life experiences. The record mainly features synthesizer sounds that were prominently popular during the 1980s as well as string arrangements by Joseph Trapanese and guitars by Tim Pierce. Upon the release of Piece by Piece, "Nostalgic" has received a very positive response from music critics, who lauded the track as one of the album's highlights and complimented the 1980s nostalgia evoked from the song.

== Background and composition ==
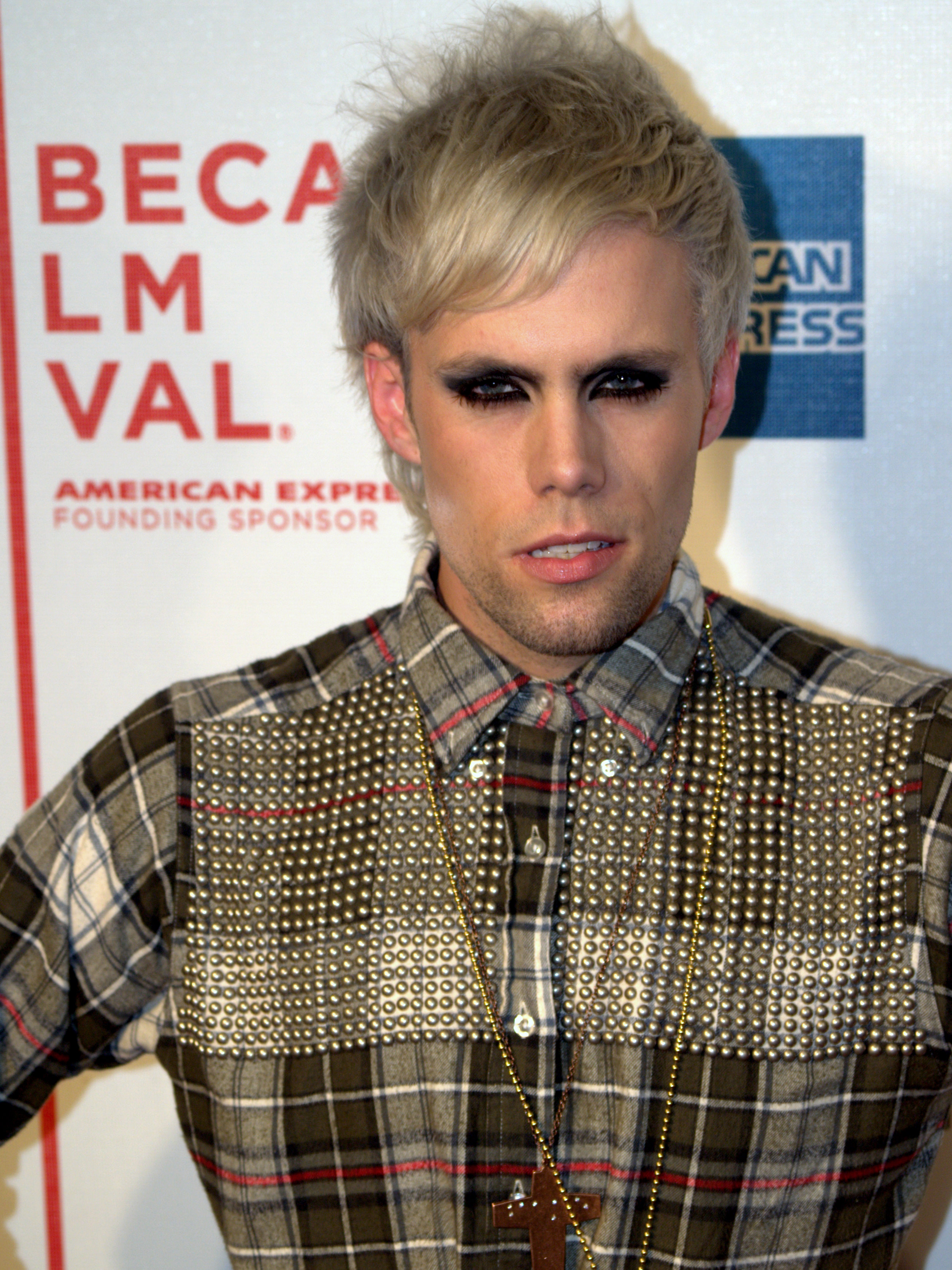
The lyrics of "Nostalgic" was mainly based from Justin Tranter (pictured) and Dan Keyes's life experiences.

In 2012, Tranter relocated from New York City to Los Angeles after while completing the release of Semi Precious Weapons' third studio album, Aviation. While finding a record label to release their album, Tranter signed a publishing deal with Warner/Chappell Music to write material for other artists. Aviation was finally released in 2014, and Tranter met with Ryland Blackinton, Dan Keyes and Vaughn Oliver for a writing session in Silver Lake, Los Angeles.

Musically, "Nostalgic" is a synth electro rock song, with music critics comparing it sonically to the 1980s sounds of the musical acts Phoenix, Roxette, and Tegan and Sara. According to the sheet music published by Hal Leonard Corporation, "Nostalgic" is written in the key of F major with a moderate tempo. Lyrically, it sings of someone reminiscing both the good and bad moments of a failed relationship, during which the singer becomes nostalgic while finally acknowledging its culmination. The song is based primarily on Tranter's and Keyes's past relationships, with Tranter himself coming up with an idea of a song titled "Nostalgic", coming up with the main lyric "Even though we lost it, I still get nostalgic." Tranter sang the demo of the track and sent it to Clarkson who recorded it with Halbert in 2013. Upon hearing Clarkson's final version of the track, Tranter revealed that he was overwhelmed. He remarked, "having listened to my demo for over a year and then going to New York, where I used to live, and hearing (Clarkson's) version in the RCA offices. I was a total loser—I started crying in this meeting with all these executives. I was like, 'I can't believe this is my life, I'm so happy.'"

== Critical reception ==
"Nostalgic" (2015)
Justin Tranter came up with lyric "Even though we lost it, I still get nostalgic" and the song's '80s sound to evoke a nostalgic atmosphere.

"Nostalgic" has received a very positive response from various music critics, most of them complimenting the 1980s nostalgia evoked from the song. Editors of Entertainment Weekly included it as one of their "16 songs we're loving this spring" list, citing that Clarkson's lost-love anthem, which is tinged with shimmering synths and the most ladylike of power chords, is potent even if one is only "nostalgic" for Lisa Frank stickers and Day-Glo fanny packs. Reviewing for The A.V. Club, Annie Zaleski remarked that Clarkson's voice cracks with bluesy grit of the track, and commended that as one of the loose moments that energizes the album. In his review for The Dallas Morning News's Guide Live section, music critic Hunter Hauk wrote that "Nostalgic" amounts to a perfect pop confection. Reviewing Piece by Piece for Idolator, Jonathan Riggs complimented the song as a "sister-in-song" of "Stronger" (2011). The Plain Dealer's Troy L. Smith praised "Nostalgic" as fantastic as it takes the listener on a trip back to the 1980s. In both their interviews with Clarkson, Official Charts Company's editor Rob Cobsey and Glamour's Alyse Whitney extolled it as a great song, with Cobsey also endorsing it to her as a prospective single. Jason Scott of Popdust.com praised it as the most adventurous of all the album's tracks. Chuck Arnold of Rolling Stone also complimented Clarkson's vocals over the synth strut the track, along with its 1980s homage. However, Slant Magazine's Alexa Camp was indifferent to the song, saying that the songs that should ostensibly inspire nostalgia instead feel like they just rolled off a conveyor belt.

== Credits and personnel ==
Credits adapted from the Piece by Piece liner notes and "Nostalgic" metadata.

Recording

- Engineered at The Dressing Room, Nashville, Tennessee and The Listening Station, Nashville, Tennessee

Personnel

- All vocals – Kelly Clarkson
- Engineering – Christopher Dye
  - Additional engineering – John Denosky
- Bass, keyboards, production, and programming – Jason Halbert, Eric Olson
- Additional programming – Matt Stanfield, Joseph Trapanese
- Guitars – Tim Pierce
- Mastering – Chris Gehringer
- Mixing – Serban Ghenea
  - Engineering for mixing – John Hanes
- Production coordination – Lani Crump, Dave Steunebrink
- Songwriting – Justin Tranter, Ryland Blackinton, Dan Keyes, Vaughn Oliver
- String arrangement – Joe Trapanese

== Charts ==
Chart (2015)	Peak position
South Korea International Downloads (Gaon)	67

== See also ==
- Nostalgia in music
