= Nostalgia (disambiguation) =

Nostalgia is a sentimentality for the past.

Nostalgia may also refer to:

== Film and television ==
- Nostalghia, a 1983 Russian-Italian film by Andrei Tarkovsky
- Nostalgia (1971 film), stylised as (nostalgia), an avant-garde film by Hollis Frampton
- Nostalgia (2018 film), an American film by Mark Pellington
- Nostalgia (2022 film), an Italian-French film by Mario Martone
- Nostalgia (TV series), 2018 ABS-CBN Filipino drama series
- Nostalgia, a character in movie Inside Out 2

== Music ==
- Adult standards, a radio format (also sometimes known as the nostalgia format)
- Nostalgia Night (la Noche de la Nostalgia), a celebration of musical oldies in Uruguay
- Nostalghia (musician), American singer and songwriter

=== Classical compositions ===
- Nostalghia, for violin & string orchestra Toru Takemitsu
- "Nostalgia", for flute & guitar by David Leisner
- Nostalgia, for piano by Tigran Mansurian

=== Albums ===
- Nostalgia (The Jazztet album), 1988
- Nostalgia (Ivan Kral album), 1995
- Nostalgia (Annie Lennox album), 2014
- Nostalgia (Eslabon Armado album), 2022
- Nostalgia (Rod Wave album), 2023
- Nostalgia, a 2004 album by July for Kings
- Nostalgia, a 1983 album by Milly Quezada
- Nostalgia, an EP by Fat Tulips
- Nostalgia, a 2015 EP by Chase Atlantic
- Nostalgia (Victon EP), 2019
- Nostalgia (Tresor album), 2019
- Nostalgia (Noemi album), 2025
- Nostalgia (Mother Mother album), 2025

=== Songs ===
- "Nostalgia" (Blanco song), 2022
- "Nostalgia" (Rod Wave and Wet song), 2023
- "Nostalgia", a 2008 song by Emily Barker and The Red Clay Halo
- "Nostalgia", a song by Epica from the album Requiem for the Indifferent
- "Nostalgia", a song by Pentagon from the 2020 EP WE:TH
- "Nostalgia", a 2009 song by Megumi Nakajima
- "Nostalgia", a 1985 song by The Chameleons
- "Nostalgia", a 1975 song by Francis Goya
- "Nostalgia", a 1978 song by Buzzcocks
- "Nostalgia", a song in Yanni's Keys to Imagination (1986) and other albums
- "Nostalgia", a song by Gorguts from the 1998 album Obscura
- "Nostalgija", the Croatian entry in the 1995 Eurovision Song Contest
- "Nostalgia", B-side of Kufor a šál by Marika Gombitová
- "Nostalgia", a song by David Sylvian from the 1984 album Brilliant Trees

== Other media ==
- Nostalgia (novel), a 1993 novel by Mircea Cărtărescu
- Nostalgia (sculpture), in Puerto Vallarta, Jalisco
- Nostalgia (video game), a 2008 Japanese role-playing game for Nintendo DS
- Nostalgia, a 2017 rhythm game by Bemani

== See also ==
- Nostalgia Night, a national celebration of Uruguay, observed on August 24 each year
- Nostalgia Critic, a persona used by Doug Walker on the website Channel Awesome
- Nostalgic (disambiguation)
