= Sint-Pieters-Leeuw Tower =

Tower in Belgium

Coordinates: 50°46′04″N 4°13′27″E

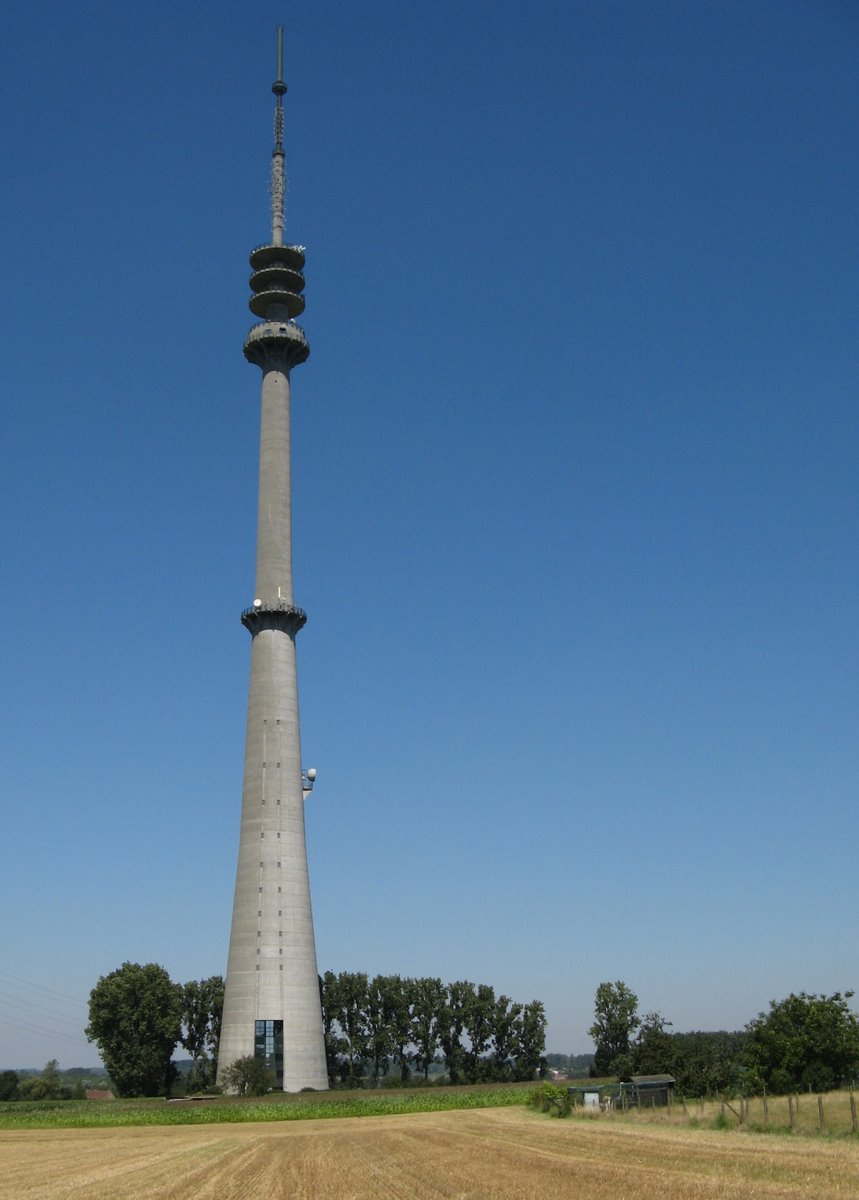
Sint-Pieters-Leeuw Tower in August 2007

The Sint-Pieters-Leeuw Tower (Dutch: Zendmast van Sint-Pieters-Leeuw), sometimes called the VRT Tower (Dutch: VRT-toren), although there are several by that name, is a 302-metre-tall (991 ft) free standing tower at Sint-Pieters-Leeuw, on the outskirts of Brussels, Belgium, built between 1991 and 1994. It is the tallest free standing structure in Belgium. The tower's location, south-west of Brussels, was chosen for its central location in Belgium and to minimize hindrance to Brussels Airport beyond the opposite end of the city. The tower is owned by Norkring België.

After its construction, it emerged that the tower was built illegally, due to irregularities in the building permits. There were complaints against it as locals feel the unpainted concrete is an eyesore, and it has even been suggested that the tower may be demolished. In April 2007, the irregularities were straightened out and the tower has retroactively acquired the legal permit to be built.

== See also ==
- List of towers
- VRT
