= Pantomime (The Pillows EP) =

EP by The Pillows
- Released: May 21, 1990
- Recorded: 1990
- Studio: Echo House
- Genre: Post-punk
- Length: 22:29
- Language: Japanese
- Label: Captain Records; GONG-6021
- Producer: Koji Ishikawa (Captain Records)

The Pillows chronology
Pantomime (1990)	90's My Life (1990)

Pantomime (パントマイム) is an EP / mini-album released by The Pillows on May 21, 1990. It marked the band's debut commercial release and has since, like its follow-up 90's My Life, gone out of print. Despite this, it can often be found on Japanese auction websites ranging from ¥4,000 – ¥5,000 JPY.

Pantomime was re-released (TECN-15397) in 1998 as part of the 'Captain Records 10th Anniversary' campaign, where popular releases from artists on the label in the late 1980s were re-released.

== Copyright history ==
When Pantomime was first released in 1990, the rights to the EP were held under the ‘Bang-a-GONG’ sub-label (hence GONG-6021) of Captain Records (キャプテンレコード). Captain Records served the distribution at the time and was a subsidiary of the JICC Publication Administration (JICC 出版局), its parent company.

Between 1992–1998, the copyrights to Pantomime transferred ownership, and currently reside with ‘Ultra-Vybe Inc.’, a record company still trading today. In 1998, a selection of the original Captain Records collection (including Pantomime) was manufactured and distributed by Teichiku Records (TECN), a subsidiary of JVC Kenwood Holdings Corporation.

Upon its re-release (1998.09.23) under Teichiku Records, there was no contract or agreement with Sawao Yamanaka or the pillows, who were well into their extended relationship with King Records at the time. During one of the live performances for the ‘Penalty Life’ tour (Kyoto Muse Hall, January 19, 2004) Sawao mentioned that the first time he had heard about the re-release of Pantomime (TECN-15397) was from a fan-letter well after the release date, and that he had still not been paid any royalties as a result of Teichiku Records sales.

== Demo recordings ==
The songs ‘Stand Up And Go’, ‘Razorlike Blue’ and ‘Pantomime’ were previously performed by Sawao Yamanaka in the late 1980s while the band toured under their original formation ‘The Coinlocker Babies’ (コインロッカーベイビーズ). The group put together a demo tape that included early recordings of ‘Stand Up And Go’ and ‘Pantomime’.

- Whilst ‘Pantomime’ was a Coinlocker Babies track, Sawao had said that he didn’t want people to listen to it until he had really put some more effort into it.
- No re-recordings or self-covers have been made by the pillows for any Pantomime tracks since its initial release.
- During a performance at Shinjuku Loft on January 21, 2014, 'Razorlike Blue' and 'Energy' were performed live by the pillows with original bassist Kenji Ueda.

== Cover recordings ==
On 24 October, 2012 an omnibus CD titled ‘Miku ★ Punk Mid · Eighties · On Captain Records’ was released under SOLID records, a subsidiary of Ultra-Vybe Inc. A cover of ‘Razorlike Blue’ was recorded for the CD by the artist ‘Megurine Luka (巡音ルカ Megurine Ruka)’. Megurine Ruka is a humanoid persona voiced by a singing synthesizer application developed by Crypton Future Media, headquartered in Sapporo, Japan. She uses Yamaha Corporation's Vocaloid 2 and Vocaloid 4 singing synthesizing technology.

== Track listing ==
1. "Stand Up and Go" – 5:00
2. "Promises Are Like Dreams" (夢のような約束は) – 4:17
3. "Razorlike Blue" – 3:25
4. "Pantomime" (パントマイム) – 6:32
5. "Energy" (エネルギー) – 3:15

All songs were written by the pillows. Tracks 1,3,4 and 5 written by Sawao Yamanaka. Track 2 was composed by Kenji Ueda, with lyrics by Sawao Yamanaka.

== Pricing information ==
All pricing as at release date(s).

Release type	Price
Pantomime (パントマイム) (GONG-6021) (Tax included)	¥ 2,153 JPY
Pantomime (パントマイム) (GONG-6021) (Standard)	¥ 2,090 JPY
Pantomime (パントマイム) (TECN-15397) (Re-issue Tax included)	¥ 1,543 JPY

== Production information ==
All credits taken from album liner notes.

- Vocals/guitar - Yamanaka Sawao (山中さわお)
- Lead guitar - Manabe Yoshiaki (真鍋 吉明)
- Bass - Ueda Kenji (上田ケンジ)
- Drums - Sato Shinichiro (佐藤シンイチロウ)
- Produced by the pillows
- Executive Producer - Koji Ishikawa (Captain Records)
- Supervisor - Yoshiyuki Kuroda (黒田義之) (Music Vision)
- Artist Manager - Yoshihiro Aki (Music Vision)
- Recording Engineer - Michiaki Sasaki (Sound Graphics)
- Assistant Engineer - Terushi Maruyama (Echo House)
- Place of Recording - Echo House
- Place of Mixing - Echo House
