= NRG Engineering =

Singapore-based engineering consultancy

- Founded: 2005; 21 years ago
- Headquarters: Fusionopolis complex, Singapore
- Website: www.nrgengineering.com

NRG Engineering is a Singapore consulting company specializing in the Oil and Gas Industry with worldwide operations. It was founded in 2005. In 2008, NRG Engineering moved its company headquarters to the new "Fusionopolis" complex in Singapore, and has a representative office in France.

The company is privately owned. It underwent some changes in ownership in 2010 with the departure of two of the three initial co-founders of the company.

NRG Engineering works with oil companies, EPC Contractors and engineering MNCs at different stages of their project. In 2005, they signed the first contract with Cegelec on the Agbami platform operations training centre in Ogere.

From 2006, NRG Engineering developed considerably in Asia, notably because of their involvement in the first refinery ever built in Vietnam: the Dung Quat Refinery project, which is managed by a TECHNIP-JGC-TECNICAS REUNIDAS joint-venture. 2007 also witnessed an increase in their offshore operations, such as pipeline laying projects in Thailand and Indonesia with SAIPEM and CLOUGH, as well as drilling start-up operations in Brunei for TOTAL. 2008 saw the company taking a new turn by winning responsibilities in work in Kuwait and Nigeria. NRG was also awarded a PMC contract in the Shell Gumusut project with MMHE.

In 2014, NRG underwent a rebranding exercise to enhance its service focus to its project management, i.e. people management, safety management, training as well as software.

NRG Engineering used to organize an annual sailing event, the NRG Cup, to gather some players of the industry. The 2nd and last edition of the race was held in Thailand in July 2009.
