= Max Guazzini =

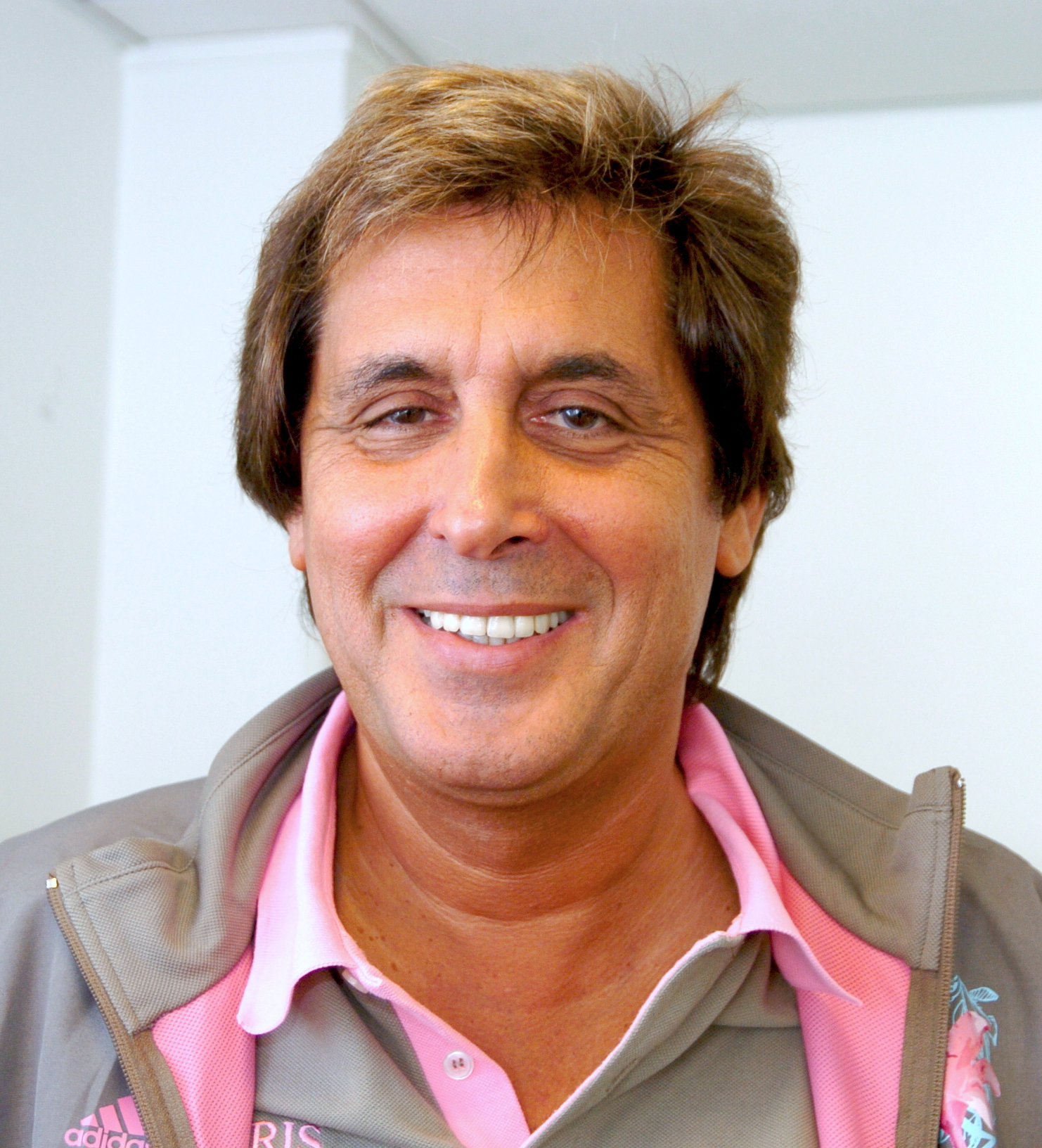
- Born: 23 October 1947 (age 78); Roquebrune-Cap-Martin, France
- Occupation: Businessman
- Known for: President of Stade Français (1992-2011)

Max Guazzini (born October 23, 1947) is a French entrepreneur and, until June 2011, the president of the Stade Français rugby union club in Paris, which competes in the Top 14, the top division of rugby union in France. Since arriving at Stade Français in the early 1990s, the club rose from the lower divisions of competition to become one of the most successful French rugby teams of the modern era.

== Early life ==
Guazzini was born in Roquebrune-Cap-Martin, Alpes-Maritimes, into a family of Italian origin (he also holds an Italian passport). In 1982, he founded a successful private music radio station called NRJ, until he resigned from his position as a board member in 2004.

== Career ==
Guazzini aspired to bring top-class rugby to the city of Paris, and in 1992 he took over Stade Français, which had been playing in the lower divisions. The club was in the third division when he took over in 1992. He would later say, “I want to build a club for Paris, for the people, of which it can be proud”. With his support, the club merged with another Parsian team, the Comitie Athletic St Germain (CASG) in 1995. Under the leadership of head-coach Bernard Laporte (later becoming the head coach of France) they rose rapidly up into the elite division of French rugby. By 1998, they had won the French championship, and completed a dramatic rise to glory in a short period of time.

He is known for his eccentricity, and it was Guazzini's idea for Stade to play in pink kits. Over the years, they have played in a variety of unusual, gawdy shirts including designs featuring lightning bolts, flowers, fluorescent pink tie-dye, and Andy Warhol-inspired designs.

Guazzini scheduled a home fixture in 2005 against Stade Toulousain at the national stadium, Stade de France. The final attendance was 79,502, smashing the national attendance record for a league match in any sport by more than 20,000. Moments before the end of the match, Guazzini announced to the crowd that another fixture scheduled against Biarritz in March 2006 would also be held at the stadium. The Stade-Biarritz match broke the attendance record from earlier in the season, with 79,604 attending.

In 2011, the club faced major financial issues due to the failure of an affiliated advertising company. Guazzini had announced a deal with a Canadian foundation and an unnamed outside investor to sell a controlling interest in the club, but the deal fell apart amid scandal, and Stade was threatened with a forced relegation into the country's amateur ranks. Guazzini eventually sold a controlling stake in the team to a group led by Jean-Pierre Savare, chairman of French security systems firm Oberthur Technologies. As part of the deal, Guazzini stepped aside in favour of Savare's son Thomas, but remains affiliated with the club as honorary president.
