= Nostalgie (Flanders) =

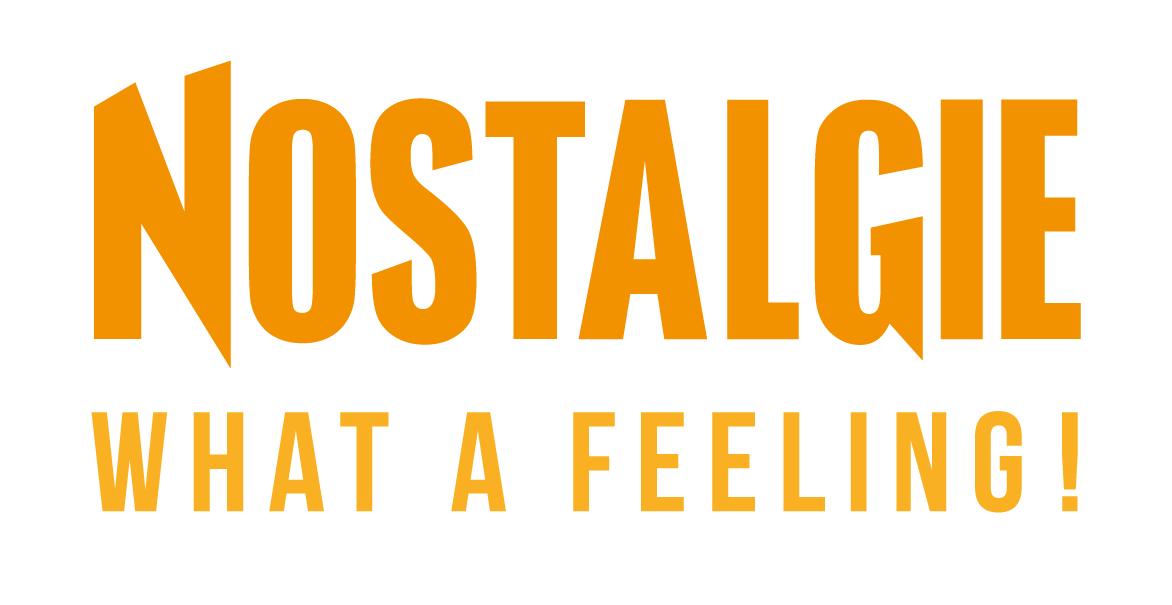
- Belgium
- Broadcast area: Belgium; Flanders
- Branding: We Are Music (2024-present)

Programming
- Language: Dutch
- Format: Classic Hits

Ownership
- Owner: Vlaanderen Eén
- Sister stations: NRJ Wallonie; Nostalgie Wallonie; Nostalgie Plus

History
- First air date: 20 March 2008
- Former call signs: What a feeling! (2008-2023); Jouw Moment, Jouw Classic (2018-2020)
- Former names: Play Nostalgie (2023-2025)

Links
- Website: Nostalgie

Nostalgie (between 2023 and 2025 Play Nostalgie) is a private Belgian radio station broadcasting in Flanders and Brussels but can also be heard in some parts of Wallonia, and is dedicated to mainly music of the 1970s, 1980s and 1990s. Nostalgie was created on 20 March 2008 as a fusion of five radiostations focused on the Flemish provinces of Belgium, and is owned by Vlaanderen Eén, a joint venture of Mediahuis, Play Media and the NRJ Group.

== History ==
In March 2008, Nostalgie Vlaanderen started broadcasting on the former frequencies of the radio stations: Antwerpen 1, Radio Go, Radio Mango and Radio Contact Vlaanderen, and it was created by the media groups: Concentra N.V. and Corelio in collaboration with the NRJ Group, the largest radio group of Europe. The station competes with the nationwide commercial radio stations of the Vlaamse Media Maatschappij: Q-music and JOE fm.

Since 8 March 2010, Nostalgie can also be heard in the province of Limburg after the acquisition of the frequencies of EXQI FM.

On 23 February 2023, it was announced that Telenet will become co-owner of Nostalgie. The company gained a 20% part of the station after approval through Play Media. Mediahuis will retain 55% ownership, while the NRJ Group (through Nostalgie Holdco, formerly Nostalgie SAS), will retain 25%. On July 15, 2023, Play Media officially became co-owner after approval.

On 23 August 2023, it was announced that due to Play Media's entry, the station would change its name to Play Nostalgie a week later on 28 August 2023. In addition, the programming was renewed with the existing and new voices.

On 25 August 2025, the name reverted back to Nostalgie, but the visual style and slogan of Play Nostalgie were kept.

== Broadcasting area ==
Nostalgie broadcasts on FM throughout Flanders and in Brussels on the following frequencies:

=== Antwerp ===
- Geel: 104,6 MHz
- Mechelen: 104,5 MHz
- Schoten: 102,9 MHz
- Turnhout: 104,5 MHz

=== East Flanders ===
- Aalst: 104,8 MHz
- Ghent: 103,5 MHz
- Oudenaarde: 104,8 MHz
- Ronse: 103,3 MHz
- Sint-Niklaas: 103,7 MHz

=== Flemish Brabant ===
- Aarschot: 104,4 MHz
- Brussels 1: 98,1 MHz
- Brussels 2: 98,4 MHz
- Diest: 99,0 MHz
- Leuven: 103,8 MHz

=== Limburg ===
- Beringen: 92,8 MHz (FM)
- Bree: 103,0 MHz
- Genk: 94,7 MHz
- Hasselt: 96,8 MHz
- Lommel: 95,9 MHz
- Overpelt: 104,2 MHz
- Sint-Truiden: 96,9 MHz
- Tongeren: 94,8 MHz

=== West Flanders ===
- Bruges: 88,1 MHz
- Egem: 98,2 MHz
- Kortrijk: 88.0 MHz
- Ostend: 87.6 MHz
- Oostvleteren: 101.0 MHz

Alongside of FM, Nostalgie also broadcasts on DAB+ and internet (through an official app and Radioplayer).

== Nostalgie Plus ==
Nostalgie Plus
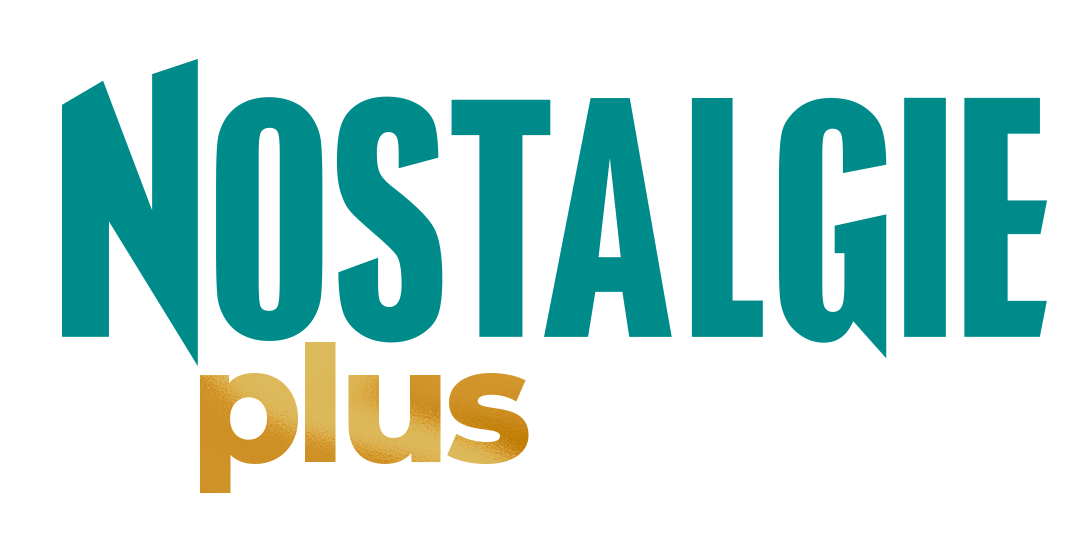
- Belgium
- Frequency: Nostalgie Plus Frequencies
- Branding: Your Golden Years

Programming
- Format: Oldies

Ownership
- Owner: Vlaanderen Eén

History
- First air date: 23 January 2023

Links
- Website: Nostalgie Plus

Nostalgie Plus (written as Nostalgie+ until 2024) is Nostalgie's sister station with a focus on music of the 60s, 70s and 80s. The station can be received via its website, app, digital TV and DAB+. The station mainly broadcast non-stop music, but regularly had special presented programmes.

Starting 29 September 2023, the station can also be received on FM, where it took over the frequencies from NRJ Flanders. This also led to a substantial expansion of the presented blocks and the number of DJs.

As of 2025, the entire programme schedule is filled with continuous presentation between 7am and 9pm on weekdays and 9am and 8pm on weekends.
