= Rire & Chansons =

French comedy radio station

France
- Broadcast area: France

Programming
- Language: French
- Format: Comedy, Pop

Ownership
- Owner: NRJ Group
- Sister stations: NRJ; Chérie FM; Nostalgie

Links
- Website: www.rireetchansons.fr

Rire & Chansons (French for "laughter and songs") is a French Category C and D radio station owned by NRJ Group, based at Paris and created in 1981. Rire & Chansons has a unique format in France, offering round-the-clock sketch comedy alternated with a mixed music programming consisted of mainly Pop-Rock.

Rire & Chansons maintains two sub-feeds for Réunion and Tahiti areas; each of the feeds carry entirely separate programming content & schedule from the national feed.

== History ==
Rire & Chansons is created by Jean-Paul Baudecroux in 1989 in Paris on the Parisian frequency of the defunct radio station Pacific FM, which was acquired by the NRJ Group and the frequencies were redistributed to Chérie FM.

As the name suggests, and still in use today, it broadcasts comedy shows, sketches, funny stories and parodies, alongside playing a variety of French and international pop-rock songs. Currently music is not included in the morning and afternoon drive show "100% Sketches". Rire & Chansons is the world's only French radio station to transmit this type of programming around the clock.

In 1995, the NRJ group created "GIE RIRE" (for "independent regional radios") in order to commercialize several local radio stations that broadcast unidentified programs similar to Rire & Chansons. The entire network is created with the support of Marc Zénou, president of the SNRP (Syndicat national des radios privées, National Union of Private Radio) and head of Radio Star (Mulhouse) and Radio Service. The local programs disappeared to give way to non-presenter programs identified by the slogan "la radio du rire".

In 1997, NRJ forced the hand of the CSA which had not yet authorized the group to create a new national network. The program of affiliated radios is renamed Rire & Chansons. After negotiations, NRJ pledged to maintain local stations and their staff, and the CSA officially authorized the creation of the network.

In 1999, following the acquisition of Nostalgie by NRJ, the CSA forced NRJ to close down Rire & Chansons' local stations. This decision will allow NRJ to maintain a national network at a lower cost, without the need to fulfill the cost of local staffers in the network.

Philippe Bouvard joins Rire & Chansons in 2000 after serving as Les Grosses Têtes's interim director on RTL.

From 2003 to 2012, the radio was signalized by prank calls of the animator and humorist Gérald Dahan. Several political figures such as Jean-Pierre Raffarin or Nicolas Sarkozy and sports figures like Raymond Domenech and Zinédine Zidane were trapped. 22 February 2012, after the disclosure on the Internet of a wrong call to the detriment of the candidate for the French presidential election of 2012, Nicolas Dupont-Aignan, the radio decides to stop his collaboration with the animator.

In September 2011, following the eviction of Laurent Baffie from Europe 1, the station offers him a chance to host C'est quoi ce bordel ? show on air every Sunday morning at 11. The show closed down in January 2013.

== Slogans ==
- From 1989 to 2011 : Du rire et du Rock / Du rire garanti toutes les 3 minutes (The laugh and the rock / The laugh guaranteed every 3 minutes)
- From 2011 to 2016 : La radio officielle du rire ! (The official station to laugh!)
- Since 2017 : La radio du rire ! (The station to laugh!)

== Live hosts ==
- Bruno Roblès (weekdays 6:00am – 10:00am)
- Christophe Marceaux (weekdays 10:00am – 1:00pm)
- Sébastien Boché (weekdays 4:00pm – 8:00pm)
- Stéphane Hagopian (weekends 12:00pm – 4:00pm)
- Didier Raynal (weekdays 1:00pm – 4:00pm)
- Jean-Paul Dahbar (weekends 6:00am – 12:00pm)
- Michaël Vigneron (weekends 4:00pm – 10:00pm)

== Web-radios ==
The station Rire et Chansons broadcasts on FM, and is also available on the internet, with currently 17 web-radios.

- Rire & Chansons Blagues
- Rire & Chansons Canulars
- Rire & Chansons Collectors
- Rire & Chansons Duos
- Rire & Chansons en Amoureux
- Rire & Chansons Futurs Talents
- Rire & Chansons Hommage à Coluche
- Rire & Chansons Humour du Sud
- Rire & Chansons Live
- Rire & Chansons Nouvelle Génération
- Rire & Chansons One Woman Show
- Rire & Chansons Open du Rire
- Rire & Chansons Semoun
- Rire & Chansons Sketches
- Rire & Chansons Stand-up
- Rire & Chansons Vacances
