= Nostalgia Night =

Annual musical celebration in Uruguay

Noche de la Nostalgia
- Official name: Noche de la Nostalgia
- Observed by: Uruguay
- Type: National
- Date: 24 August
- Next time: 24 August 2026
- Related to: dancing, oldies

The Nostalgia Night (Spanish: Noche de la Nostalgia) is an annual celebration that takes place in Uruguay every August 24, on the eve of the national holiday of Independence Day. On this night, numerous parties and events are held nationwide—especially in dance clubs—exclusively playing “oldies”. The celebration centers on music from the 1960s, 70s, 80s, and 90s, and pays tribute to the cultural heritage of those decades—now embraced as retro culture—not only through music but also by honoring television and broader cultural expressions of the era.

Originally started as a special event by a radio station, it has since become one of the most popular nightlife celebrations in Uruguay, attracting tourists from neighboring countries to join the festivities. This popularity led to its official recognition as a national celebration and its promotion by the Ministry of Tourism since 2004.

== Overview ==
Uruguayans are said to be typically nostalgic. Since its inception, the celebration has grown in popularity across the country and evolved into a commercially profitable event, to the point where August 24 has become synonymous with nostalgia and retro culture. Storefronts and shopping malls are adorned with vinyl records and disco motifs, television networks broadcast special music programs and classic shows, and cinemas screen iconic films. Beyond nightclub events, the tradition extends to bowling alleys, neighborhood clubs, dinner shows, as well as themed gatherings among friends and families.

== History ==
The Nostalgia Night originated in 1978, when radio entrepreneur Pablo Lecueder hosted a party at a Montevideo nightclub featuring music—mostly from the late 1960s and early 1970s—to promote his Old Hits program on CX 32 Radiomundo. The date of August 24 was chosen because it fell on the eve of Uruguay’s Independence Day public holiday. Following the success of that first celebration, it became an annual tradition, with other clubs embracing the concept and organizing their own themed parties on the same night.

The early editions of these celebrations centered on music from the late 1960s and early 1970s. Songs by internationally renowned performers such as Queen, Simon and Garfunkel, Cat Stevens, The Beatles, Dire Straits, Supertramp, Elvis Presley, Barry Manilow, Bee Gees, and John Travolta were commonly featured, reflecting genres including disco and the new romantic movement. Beginning in the first days of August, local radio stations broadcast these hits, thereby popularizing what became known as “old music.” Over time, the repertoire expanded to incorporate music from the 1980s, with artists such as Miko Mission, David Lyme, Baltimora and Madonna, as well as music from the 1990s, represented by groups such as Technotronic and 2 Unlimited.

As the popularity of the celebration increased over the years, the organization of nostalgia parties expanded beyond the initial gatherings. Entrepreneurs in the entertainment industry began to offer events in a wide range of formats and price levels, including large public parties, dinner shows, themed celebrations, and costume events. At the same time, groups of friends and families marked the occasion with private reunions in a more intimate setting. In parallel, so-called “anti-nostalgia parties” also emerged, aimed at those who preferred to frequent night venues on that date without identifying with the nostalgic theme.

Nostalgia Night is one of the most popular annual celebrations in Uruguay, comparable in prominence within the country's nightlife to Christmas and New Year's Eve. Events take place throughout the country, attracting a diverse audience, including both younger and older attendees, and often drawing visitors from neighboring countries such as Argentina and Brazil.
