= Chérie FM =

- France
- Broadcast area: France (National Network); Monaco
- Frequencies: 91.3 MHz (Paris); 98.9 MHz (Lyon); 100.1 MHz (Marseille); 96.4 MHz (Monaco) c List of other frequencies
- RDS: CHERIEFM

Programming
- Language: French
- Format: Adult contemporary music

Ownership
- Owner: NRJ Group

History
- First air date: 1987; 39 years ago

Links
- Website: www.cheriefm.fr

Chérie FM is a French radio station created in 1987. It belongs to the NRJ Group.

== History ==
Chérie FM was established in 1987 in Paris by media executive Jean-Paul Baudecroux on the former frequency of the now-defunct station Gilda la Radiopolitaine. In 1989, Chérie FM began broadcasting nationally after the NRJ Group acquired the frequencies of Pacific FM. Most of Pacific FM's regional frequencies were reallocated to Chérie FM, while the Paris frequency was used to launch a separate station, Rire & Chansons.

In 1992, the NRJ Group expanded the brand internationally by launching Chérie FM Belgique in Belgium, targeting French-speaking audiences in Wallonia and Brussels. The Belgian version ceased operations in May 2008 after 16 years on air.

On 12 December 2012, the NRJ Group launched a television counterpart to the radio station, named Chérie 25. The channel broadcasts in France via Télévision Numérique Terrestre (TNT) in high definition. While sharing the brand identity and target demographic—primarily women—with Chérie FM, Chérie 25 features a distinct programming lineup that includes talk shows, documentaries, entertainment segments, television series, and films.

== Identity of Chérie FM ==
=== Slogans ===
Since the creation of Chérie FM, several slogans were used:

- From 1990 till 1999: Écoutez, vous allez chanter ! or Si vous l'écoutez, vous allez chanter ! (Listen, you will sing!)
- From 1999 till 2000: Jamais la musique ne vous aura fait autant de bien ! (Music never made you feel so good!)
- From 2000 till 2004: Toutes vos chansons préférées (All your favorite songs)
- From 2004 till May 2007: Douceur, émotion, passion (Softness, Emotion, Passion)
- From May 2007 till 2010: Les hits qui font battre mon cœur (The hits that make my heart beat)
- From 2000 till November 2012: Vos plus belles émotions (The most beautiful emotions)
- November 2012 till April 2019: Pop Love Music
- From April 2019 till April 2023: La Plus Belle Musique (The Most Beautiful Music)
- From April 2023 till February 2026: Feel Good Music
- Since February 2026: La Playlist 2000 (The 2000 Playlist)

== Webradios ==
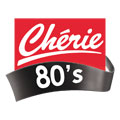
Example of one of the webradio's current logos : Chérie 80's

Chérie FM is, like its sister station Nostalgie, offering 33 webradios specialized in various genres:

- Chérie FM (main station)
- Chérie 80's
- Chérie 90's
- Chérie At Work
- Chérie Acoustic
- Chérie Adele
- Chérie Ballads
- Chérie Ed Sheeran
- Chérie Fitness
- Chérie Frenchy
- Chérie Jazzy
- Chérie Latino
- Chérie Les Plus Belles Voix
- Chérie Live
- Chérie Katy Perry
- Chérie Love Songs
- Chérie No Repeat
- Chérie Nouvelle Scène
- Chérie Nouveautés
- Chérie Party
- Chérie Pop
- Chérie Pop Ballads
- Chérie R'n'B Chic
- Chérie Romantic
- Chérie Sweet Home
- Chérie Zen
- Chérie Running
- Chérie Italie

=== Former or periodic ===
- Chérie 1200 Émotions
- Chérie After Work (now: Sweet Home)
- Chérie Baby
- Chérie by A.Manoukian
- Chérie Cinéma
- Chérie Cook
- Chérie FM Garden Party
- Chérie Golds
- Chérie Italia (periodic)
- Chérie Noël (periodic)
- Chérie Piano Jazz
- Chérie Romantic
- Chérie Sade
- Chérie Saint Valentin (periodic)
- Chérie FM Sunshine
- Chérie Tropique
