= NRG Networks =

UK-based business networking organisation

- Industry: Advocate marketing
- Founded: June 2004; 22 years ago
- Founders: Kim Sharman; Martin Davies
- Headquarters: United Kingdom
- Key people: Dave Clarke (CEO)
- Website: nrg-networks.com

NRG Networks is a UK-based business networking organisation, founded in June 2004 by Kim Sharman and Martin Davies to facilitate the development of business relationships based on trust and knowledge between SME Business owners in a social network environment. Dave Clarke joined as Chief Executive at the end of 2004 and identified that these business relationships resulted in a network of advocates. Networking for Advocates was subsequently introduced as the NRG networking model. Kim Sharman retired at the end of 2006.

The model of "Networking for Advocates" was investigated in some research conducted by Martin Davies and Roger Croft of the University of Bath. The purpose of the research was to further understand the importance of developing trust in business relationships. The research identified certain networking transactions as the currency of developing trusted business relationships. This led to the development of the NRG Networking System based on this Advocacy Model.

NRG Business Networking Advocate Model:

Tactic	Networking Transactions	Judgments	Drivers
Make Contact	Situational awareness	Potential reward?	Do I like them? Mutual networking transactions?
Follow up	Introductions	Potential reward? Are they reliable enough? Are they able enough?	Initial business assessment. Mutual networking transactions? Feedback from others
Form Relationships	Qualified referrals, High value introductions, research information	Quantify reward? Quantify risk?	Further business assessment Mutual networking transactions Further feedback
Develop Advocates	Unqualified referrals, Share IP, Joint ventures, support, testimonials	Monitor reward Monitor risk	Rewards Risks

The organisation is structured around local groups, and primarily delivers its benefits via a monthly lunch meeting, preceded by a business development seminar.
