= Energie =

Energie can refer to:

- Energie FC a Benin football club
- Energie Group, a UK based fitness franchise company
- Énergie, a French-language brand of rhythmic top 40 radio in Quebec, Canada
- FC Energie Cottbus, a German professional association-football (soccer) club
- Groupe Énergie, another name for the UFO religion Siderella

Note also the term Energiewende:

- Energiewende in Germany, the transition to a sustainable energy system for Germany
