= NRJ Group =

French media company

NRJ Group SA
- Company type: Public
- Traded as: Euronext Paris: NRG; CAC All-Share
- Industry: activities of head offices
- Founded: Paris, France (1981; 45 years ago)
- Founder: Jean-Paul Baudecroux; Max Guazzini
- Headquarters: Paris, France
- Area served: France
- Key people: Jean-Paul Baudecroux (President); Maryam Salehi (Vice-president)
- Revenue: € 343,600,000 (2010)
- Subsidiaries: Radio : NRJ, Chérie FM, Nostalgie, Rire & Chansons. Television : NRJ Hits; Other : NRJ Mobile, NRJ Music Awards, NRJ Music Tour, NRJ International, NRJ Compilations, NRJ Entertainment.
- Website: nrjgroup.com

The NRJ Group (NRJ is an acronym read as énergie (French: [enɛʁʒi]) in French) (Euronext: NRG) is a French multimedia group based in Paris. It was founded by Jean-Paul Baudecroux and Max Guazzini in 1981. Since its founding as a French pop music radio station, it has grown and evolved to become the NRJ Group.

All stations of NRJ Group carry around 40 minutes every hour of non-stop hits (or sometimes, "10 hits in a row").

NRJ Group currently has 33 FM stations (transmitting through 1260 frequencies) and around 220 internet stations and 12 mobile applications, along with replay TV and a host of other services.

== The Radio Record Group ==
The NRJ Group grew from one radio station to a brand of corporate commercial radio stations across Europe. It has stations in France, Germany, Egypt, Finland, Norway, Sweden, Switzerland, among others. NRJ plays current and newly released music for young audiences. Their slogan and promise is "Hit Music Only".

The majority of NRJ-branded stations are operated by the NRJ Group. However, some are licensed, such as the Bulgarian version, which is operated by Communicorp. Within France the NRJ Group operates four separate radio stations: NRJ, Nostalgie, Chérie FM and Rire & Chansons. They also operate the Chérie 25 digital terrestrial television station, in addition to NRJ Hits music television stations in France. They also operated their own designated channel, NRJ 12, until its closure in 2025.

In 1989, NRJ became listed on the Paris Stock Exchange Secondary Market and has continued to climb, reaching the First Market in 2000 after regrouping all of its assets into the NRJ Group.

In French, the pronunciations of NRJ and Energy (énergie) are — almost, except for the first vowel which is respectively open-mid and close-mid - identical, and sounds very similar to the English word Energy.

== International ==
With its pan-European NRJ/ENERGY stations, the Paris-based NRJ Group has challenged the European radio market by being significantly different from other market players like the Luxembourg-based RTL Group (Antenne Bayern, RTL Berlin, Yorin FM), and SBS Broadcasting (Radio 1 Norway, The Voice) or Stockholm-based MTG (P4 Norway, Rix FM, Lugna Favoriter).

Since June 6, 2006, NRJ has been operational in Lebanon, further expanding its reach and influence. On July 6, 2009, NRJ announced it would license its brand to Astral Media, owner of Canada's Énergie radio network, consisting of 10 regional stations in Quebec, along with a national broadcast as Énergie^{2} on Satellite Radio in Canada and in the United States (the Sirius Canada channel would be replaced in 2010 with Latitude Franco). This is the first North American expansion for NRJ.

Since the mid-1990s, NRJ has licensed its 24/7 programming stream out of Paris, to Japan's largest cable system, Usen Corporation.

All of NRJ's international operations are concentrated on a contemporary hit radio station (with the same slogan, jingles, sound, etc...) while its competitors tend to create local radio brands with various radio formats, thereby taking advantage of their audience's local identity.

Today NRJ is broadcasting in over 20 countries, mainly throughout Europe, but also in North America, South America and several overseas territories of France. The following is a list of current and defunct international stations, including France.

NRJ also operates four 24-hour hit music television channels, in Lebanon, France, Switzerland, and Belgium.

To extend friendlier terms to customers and vendors, NRJ sacrificed improvements in revenues and margins, explaining the year-on-year earnings decline in 2017.

== See also ==
- NRJ (The radio station)
- NRJ Music Awards
