= NRJ =

French radio station

- Type: Radio network
- Country: France
- Availability: 100.3 MHz (Paris); 106.4 MHz (Marseille); 103.0 MHz (Lyon); Full list of other frequencies on NRJ.fr
- Broadcast area: France (including Guadeloupe, French Guiana, La Réunion, Martinique, Mayotte, New Caledonia, Tahiti, and St. Martin), Austria, Belgium, Bulgaria, Egypt, Finland, Georgia, Germany, Lebanon, Mauritius, Morocco, Norway, Sweden and Switzerland
- Owner: NRJ Group (France, Belgium, Germany); Bauer Media Group (Norway, Sweden and Finland); N&C Radio Privé (Austria); Ringier AG (Switzerland); Communicorp (Bulgaria); Sky Production (Egypt)
- Launch date: 15 June 1981 (France); 1988 (Belgium); 1991 (Germany); 1 October 1993 (Sweden); 6 October 1995 (Finland); 1 January 1998 (Norway); 1 April 1998 (Austria); 13 August 2003 (Switzerland); 17 November 2005 (Bulgaria); 6 April 2006 (Ukraine); 6 June 2006 (Lebanon); 1 September 2006 (Russia); 3 March 2017 (Egypt); 14 March 2017 (Georgia); 1 December 2017 (Cyprus); 2018 (Mauritius)
- Official website: www.nrj.fr

Nouvelle Radio Jeune (Acronym: NRJ, French pronunciation: [enɛʁʒi], lit. 'energy') is a private French radio station created by Jean-Paul Baudecroux and Max Guazzini in June 1981. Widely popularized by its "godmother", singer Dalida, who prevented it from closing in 1984, the radio station currently belongs to the NRJ Group and is the founding station of NRJ International. NRJ is present in more than 15 countries and has on weekly basis more than 30 million listeners.

The main station only focuses on current chart hits throughout the day and electronic dance music during some weekend late night hours. Talk programs are based every evening except Saturday. In contrast, its web radios are devoted to a vast range of music: rap, RnB, dance, hip-hop, electronic, top 40, urban and rock.

== History ==
In June 1981 Jean-Paul Baudecroux created a music radio station for young people, and founded NRJ (standing for Nouvelle Radio des Jeunes). He then established studios in a tiny room in the 20th arrondissement of Paris in a place of high altitude to strategically cover all Paris on 92.0 MHz. The station was under repeated threat to be shut down by the authorities; however, only with the active intervention of singer Dalida and her connections was this prevented.

The station has since 1988 expanded internationally, and has started broadcasting in a number of countries:

- Russia: In June 2006, Prof Media, a leading Russian media group, was granted permission to operate the NRJ brand in Russia. NRJ Russia is primarily intended to target an audience between 18 and 35 years old. In 2025, they rebranded as Radio Energy after the termination of a contract between NRJ Group and Gazprom-Media.
- Lebanon: On 6 June 2006, NRJ launched its programme on two frequencies in Lebanon. This station is run in English and broadcasts concerts and interviews with international artists from NRJ France.
- Canada: In July 2009, Astral Media re-branded its Énergie network of stations in Quebec under the NRJ name as part of a licensing agreement with NRJ. Following their acquisition by Bell Media, the license expired, and the stations returned to the previous Énergie brand.
- Finland: In 1995, NRJ started operating in Finland.

=== Logos ===
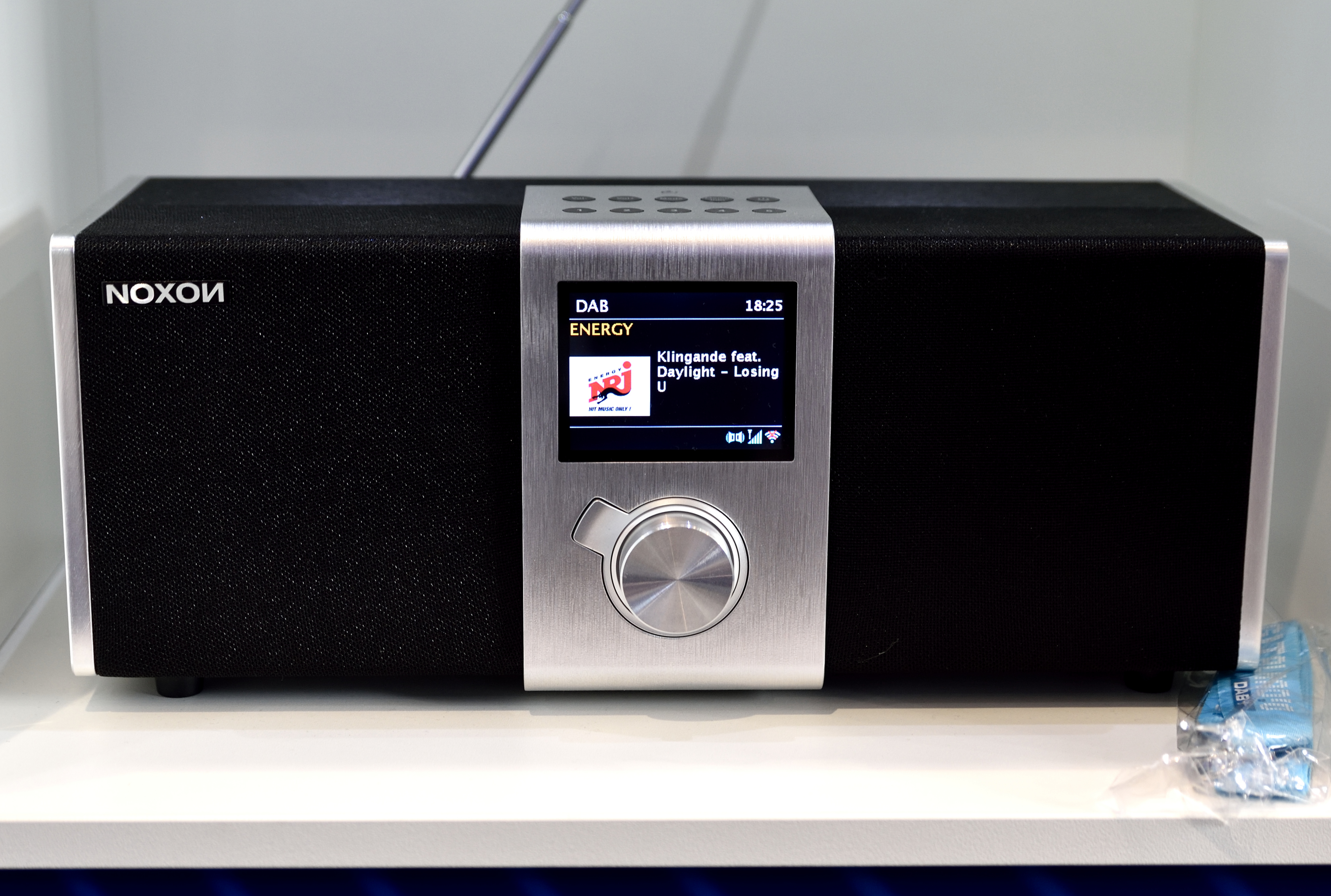
NRJ playing on DAB+

1981–2003

2003–2007

2007-2014

2014-

== Name of the station ==
NRJ was originally the acronym for Nouvelle Radio Jeune (New Youth Radio) or Nouvelle radio pour les jeunes (New Radio for the Youth), and was not invented to be an allograph of "energy". In the non-French countries where the station also operates, the radio station is simply called Energy, because NRJ can be pronounced phonetically in French as Energy or NRG.

== Statistics from Mediametrie (September 2017) ==
The bold numbers/figures are at number 1.

=== Weekdays ===
Ranking	Station	Listenership	Market share	DEA
1	NRJ	6.770.764	4.4%	1h19
2	Skyrock	4.101.520	2.1%	1h08
3	Nostalgie	3.841.110	4.7%	1h36
4	Fun Radio	3.645.800	3.3%	1h29
5	Europe 2	3.125.000	2.8%	1h15
6	RFM	3.645.800	3.2%	1h44

=== Weekends ===
Ranking	Station	Listenership	Market share	DEA
1	NRJ	5.012.975	4.7%	1h15
2	Skyrock	3.385.576	2.8%	1h08
3	Nostalgie	3.255.179	4.7%	1h45
4	Fun Radio	2.539.040	3.8%	1h17
5	Europe 2	2.213.521	2.4%	1h03
6	RFM	2.083.314	3.8%	1h48

== NRJ Presenters ==
- Manu Levy (Manu dans le 6/10 from 6AM to 10AM on weekdays)
- Camille Combal (Camille sur NRJ from 4PM to 7PM on weekdays)

== NRJ Extravadance ==
This is the name of France's no.1 dance and hip-hop mixed show, airing every weekend at late night slot.

NRJ didn't contain any programs dedicated to this until 1990, when a program called 'Megamix' was launched, presented by Dimitri or Bibi every Sunday nights from 8.00pm to 9.00pm.

The program stayed until 1992, when, for the first time, the 'Extravadance' name was used. It ran on Saturday nights from 10.00pm to 12.00am by Mike. The 'Megamix' block was not axed, but moved to 12.00am to 1.00am each Sunday (right after the new 'Extravadance'). Bibi no longer stayed in this block.

In 1993, 'Extravadance' block was expanded, now starting at 8.00pm. The new presenter for this was Cocto.

In 1994, 'Megamix' was axed, and 'Extravadance' aired every Saturday nights from 10.00pm to 1.00am. It was completely automated.

In 1995, 'Extravadance' stayed at the same timeslot, but now airing weeknights. It was anchored by Cyril Monnier.

In 1996, the show returned the 1994 format.

In 1997, it was expanded, now Saturday nights from 10.00pm to 3.00am. The only presenter was Bibi.

In 1998, 'Extravadance' updated slot to: Saturday nights from 8.00pm to 11.00pm and Friday nights from 10.00pm to 2.00am. Both editions were presented by Vincent Richard.

In 1999, both editions were expanded, now Fridays from 10.00pm to 3.00am and Saturdays from 9.00pm to 12.00am.

In 3/2000, there was, after ten years, no music mixed programming appeared on the schedule.

In 2003, this type of program was revived, but went by the name Mastermix. It broadcast every Saturday at the same timeslot as 'Extravadance' before being axed. 3 DJs featured including Vincent Richard, DJ Mouss et DJ K. From this year, NRJ no longer contains an overnight announcer.

In 2004, DJ Maze and Morgan took control of the show, which now kicked off from 10.00pm.

In 2005, 'Mastermix' was widely expanded on Saturdays, now 8.00pm-2.00am. DJs were also added, including DJ Abdel, Loo and Placido, Morgan Nagoya, DJ Kost, Alberkam, and Matt was the main presenter.

In 2007, 'Mastermix' was pushed up to an hour early (with the same duration): 7.00pm-1.00am. There was also an hour dedicated to the show's replay at 3.00am.

In 2008, the show was significantly pared down, at this time only Sunday mornings from 12.00am to 2.00am. Almost all the DJs were dropped, except Morgan Nagoya.

In 2009, it was expanded to Saturdays 10.00pm-2.00am. Morgan Nagoya was no longer the standalone DJ, but Junior Caldera or Dim Chris also mixed the music for an hour from midnight.

In 2010, 'Mastermix' was added an extra Saturday morning edition from 12.00am to 2.00am, and presented by Big Ali. Saturday night edition saw the addition of many DJs in the same timeslot, like Tiesto, Martin Solveig, Dim Chris, Bob Sinclar, Junior Caldera, Laurent Wolf. There was, for the first time after 18 years, its preceding program also dedicated to the music mix, called 'Royal Mix' and ran from 8.00pm to 10.00pm, with DJ Assad, DJ Milouz, and Leo Lanvin.

In 2011, 'Mastermix' was extended, now airing three times weekly. Friday night/Saturday morning edition now ran from 12.00am to 6.00am and presented by Big Ali till 2.00am, then DJ DMB. Saturday night edition ran from 8.00pm to 6.00am, excluding 2.00am-4.00am (featuring Better days with Bibi). The early slot from 4-6 was also presented by DJ DMB. There was also a Monday overnight edition from 12.00am to 2.00am and mixed by Remady, Junior Caldera, Dim Chris, Junior Caldera.

In 2012, the show had many changes including: Laidback Luke was given his own slot from 2-3 each Saturday morning; Leo Lanvin left 'Royal Mix'; The team took control from 9-12 Saturday nights was Tiesto, Global Deejays, Afrojack, Avicii; and Monday team consisted of DJ Oriska, Kore, Sarahina, DJ Abdel, Claude Njoya.

In 2013, after ten years in use, the name 'Mastermix' was dropped (but now being used in Germany). It now went by the name 'NRJ Extravadance'.

Currently, it broadcasts on weekdays 12:00am-6.00am, Saturdays 8.00pm-6.00am, and Sundays 12.00am-2.00am. Below is the lineup as of December 2021.

Time	Monday	Tuesday	Wednesday	Thursday	Friday	Saturday	Sunday
12:00-1:00am	Timmy Trumpet	Alok	Joel Corry	Lost Frequencies	Tiësto	Afrojack	Oriska
1:00-2:00am	Timmy Trumpet	Marnik	Lumberjack	Lost Frequencies	Armin van Buuren	Afrojack	Oriska
2:00am-3:00am	Quentin Mosimann	Gabry Ponte	Lumberjack	Damien N Drix	Armin van Buuren	Deadmau5	
3:00am-4:00am	Quentin Mosimann	Gabry Ponte	Lucky Luke	Damien N Drix	Musical Freedom Radio	Oliver Heldens	
4:00am-5:00am	Siks	Dynoro	Lucky Luke	Don Diablo	Steve Aoki	Kahama/Nrmn Faith	
5:00am-6:00am	Siks	Dynoro	Morgan Nagoya	Steff Da Campo	Steve Aoki	Morgan Nagoya	
8:00-11:00pm					Morgan Nagoya		
11:00pm-12:00am					Pacha-Morlaix		

== Programming ==
NRJ broadcasts a non-stop program known as "Top 40" or "CHR", centered around the hits of the moment, as demonstrated by its slogan "Hit music only!" and it runs "more than 40 minutes of hits in a row every hour". The concept "10 hits in a row" is again on air since January 9, 2017, on NRJ which characterizes the hit format of the radio, with the current motto "They are 10, they are fresh, they never stop". (French: "Ils sont 10, ils sont frais, ils ne s'arrêtent jamais".) From 2018, NRJ starts carrying "12" or "13 hits in a row".

== Slogans ==
Since the creation of NRJ, several slogans were used:

- 1981: NRJ je vous remercie, qui de droit !
- 1981: NRJ va, tout va !
- 1981: La radio stéréotonique
- 1981: Le plaisir avant tout
- 1981 - 1991: La plus belle radio
- 1991 - 1992: La musique est une force
- 1997 - 2014: Hit Music Only ! (Que du hit sur NRJ !)
- 2014 - Now: Hit Music Only ! (Que des hits sur NRJ !)
- 2016 - Now: Hit Music Only ! (Pop RnB Dance, Ici c'est NRJ !)

== Webradios ==
NRJ had the first web radio in 2006. Later on, there were three (included NRJ's main live stream). In the third quarter of 2006, NRJ added two, and two more at the end of that year. In 12/2013, the station operates about 153 web radios. Here are the list and complete detail of them. (Although NRJ is French, most of web radios' names are in English.) Some of these web radios can also be seen elsewhere worldwide.

NRJ had/has web radios for almost every major artist, every music genres, and every background, but mostly focus on women. They also have adverts like the main station, but no announcers heard on the air at all.

This list below is refreshed almost monthly.

=== NRJ Hits ===
This type of stations dedicated to general hits, or NRJ-produced events. Their color is red.

- NRJ
- NRJ Pure Hits Only!
- NRJ Hits
- NRJ Les Hits de Comédies Musicales
- NRJ Nouveautés Françaises
- NRJ Variété Française
- NRJ Nouveautés
- NRJ Hits 2010-2017
- NRJ Best Hits Ever
- NRJ Hits of the Day
- NRJ Hits of the Week
- NRJ Shazam
- NRJ Hits of the Month
- NRJ EuroHot 30
- NRJ French Hits
- NRJ Top Likes
- NRJ La Playlist Urban Latino
- NRJ New Hits Friday
- NRJ Nouveauté de la Semaine
- NRJ Pop R'n'B Dance
- NRJ Discover
- NRJ All Hits All Styles
- NRJ Nouveautés
- NRJ Les Hits les Plus Chauds
- NRJ Cover Hits
- NRJ La Playlist qui fait Kiffer
- NRJ Most Played
- NRJ Most Wanted
- NRJ Hits 90'
- NRJ Hit Music Only H24
- NRJ Happy Hits
- NRJ Party Hits
- NRJ Hits Never Stop
- NRJ La Playlist entre Potes
- NRJ La Maxi Playl'hits
- NRJ Futurs Talents 2018
- NRJ US Top 40
- NRJ UK Top 40
- NRJ Sex Me Up
- NRJ Mes Hits du Moment
- NRJ Ma Playlist du Matin
- NRJ Spring Break
- NRJ Best of Big Hits
- NRJ Ma Playlist du Réviser
- NRJ Hits List 2018
- NRJ La Playlist
- NRJ La BO de ta Life
- NRJ No Rap
- NRJ Monday Motivation
- NRJ Ma Playlist de la Semaine
- NRJ 13 Hits à la Suite
- NRJ La Playlist la Plus Fraiche
- NRJ Wake Up Playlist
- NRJ Mon Trajet du Matin
- NRJ La Playlist des Darons
- NRJ Ma Playlist de l'Aprèm
- NRJ Ma Playlist du Soir
- NRJ Ma Playlist de la Nuit
- NRJ Best of 2017
- NRJ Hits 2018
- NRJ Top 40
- NRJ Music Tour
- NRJ Music Awards
- NRJ Ma Playlist du Printemps
- NRJ Summer Hits Preview
- NRJ Summer Hits 2015-2017
- NRJ Sunny Hits
- NRJ Acoustic Hits
- NRJ La Playlist 2000's

=== NRJ Dance Electro ===
This type of web radios offer songs in electronic music. The color is purple.

- NRJ Dance
- NRJ Extravadance (rebroadcast of the mix that DJs performed during NRJ Extravadance)
- NRJ EDM
- NRJ Clubbin'
- NRJ Deep House
- NRJ Dance 90
- NRJ Club Hits
- NRJ Hits Remix
- NRJ Techno Story
- NRJ Remember That?

=== NRJ Classic ===
This type of web radios only focuses on a specific classic-related type of music. The color is yellow-brown.

- NRJ Pop Urbaine
- NRJ Urban Hits
- NRJ Fresh Rap FR
- NRJ Rap US
- NRJ Rap FR
- NRJ Punchline
- NRJ Gangsta Rap
- NRJ R'n'B
- NRJ R'n'B FR
- NRJ R'n'B Hits
- NRJ Hip Hop R'n'B Hits
- NRJ Urban RadiKal
- NRJ Classic Rap US
- NRJ Classic Rap FR
- NRJ Classic R'n'B
- NRJ Funky

=== Pop Rock ===
This type of web radios broadcasts heavy music. The color is dark brown.

- NRJ Pop
- NRJ Rock
- NRJ Classic Rock
- NRJ Metal

=== Sunrise ===
This type of web radios are designed to provide light music people wake up in the morning. The color is light yellow.

- NRJ Caliente
- NRJ Fiesta
- NRJ Kizomba
- NRJ Latino
- NRJ Ragga Dancehall
- NRJ Zouk
- NRJ Latino Hits
- NRJ Oriental
- NRJ Reggaeton
- NRJ Fiesta Latina
- NRJ Raï

=== Sports ===
These web radios adopt a motivated (mainly electro and hip-hop) playlist dedicated to sports activities. The color is green.

- NRJ Pour le Sport
- NRJ Fitness
- NRJ Hits for Running
- NRJ The Mud Day

=== NRJ Playlists ===
This type of web radios focus on the soundtrack on a day's moment or a particular emotion. The color is black.

- NRJ Lounge
- NRJ At Work
- NRJ At Home
- NRJ Good Night
- NRJ Sexy
- NRJ Relax
- NRJ Love
- NRJ In Bed
- NRJ Broken Heart
- NRJ Romantic
- NRJ Sentimental
- NRJ Sextape

=== NRJ Podcasts ===
This type of web radios rebroadcasts certain programs on NRJ. The color is red.

- NRJ MiKL
- NRJ Manu dans le 6/10
- NRJ YouTube
- NRJ Le Rico Show

=== NRJ Stars ===
This type of web radios focus on all the songs of a particular artist. The color is blue.

- NRJ Avicii
- NRJ Rihanna's Hits
- NRJ Maître Gims
- NRJ David Guetta's Hits
- NRJ One Direction
- NRJ Jul
- NRJ Soprano
- NRJ BTS

=== Former web radios ===
- NRJ Kendji
- NRJ SCH
- NRJ Lacrim
- NRJ Shawn Mendes
- NRJ Hip Hop Hits
- NRJ Club Hits
- NRJ Lafouine
- NRJ Frero Delavega
- NRJ Relax
- NRJ Glee
- NRJ Michael Jackson
- NRJ Louane
- NRJ Fifth Harmony
- NRJ 5 Sos
- NRJ 100 Worst
- NRJ Urban Dance
- NRJ What's Hot
- NRJ Latest Hits
- NRJ First Listen
- NRJ Get Beauty
- NRJ Zouk Love
- NRJ Tokio Hotel
- NRJ M Pokora
- NRJ Pitbull
- NRJ Tal
- NRJ Valentine's Day
- NRJ Hits for School Break
- NRJ Marseille
- NRJ Beyonce
- NRJ Games
- NRJ Taylor Swift
- NRJ Selena Gomez
- NRJ Pitch Perfect
- NRJ Adele
- NRJ Dubstep
- NRJ Boys and Girls Bands
- NRJ Chris Brown
- NRJ Sunny Hits
- NRJ North Summer Festival
- NRJ Stromae
- NRJ Demi Lovato
- NRJ Maroon 5
- NRJ Disney Channel
- NRJ en Vacances
- NRJ Pokehits
- NRJ Festival de Colmar
- NRJ Games
- NRJ Booba
- NRJ Gradur
- NRJ Jul
- NRJ Sexion d'Assaut
- NRJ Wati B
- NRJ Katy Perry
- NRJ Rihanna
- NRJ Calvin Harris

== See also ==
- Chérie FM
- Nostalgie
- Rire & Chansons
