= Radio in the Flemish Community =

This article covers the radio landscape in Flanders and Brussels, the Dutch-speaking region of Belgium known as the Flemish Community.

== FM radio ==
=== The early years ===
The legal framework for FM radio was introduced in 1930, when the Belgian government granted itself the state monopoly on radio broadcasting. By the law of June 18, 1930, the bilingual state broadcaster National Institute of Radio Broadcasting (NIR) was founded. Broadcasts were initiated on February 1, 1931. Later, the state broadcaster was split into a Dutch-language broadcaster (currently known as VRT) and a French-language broadcaster (currently known as RTBF).

=== Public radio ===
In its current form, Flanders' public broadcaster is funded by a combination of taxpayer money and advertising. The following VRT stations broadcast over FM radio, covering most of the Flemish community:

- Radio 1: news, sports and current affairs
- Radio 2: soft adult contemporary with optouts for regional programming per province
- Klara: classical music
- MNM: contemporary hit radio
- Studio Brussel: modern rock, pop, indie & dance music

All VRT stations except Klara broadcast commercials. In addition, the VRT has some digital radio stations that are broadcast online and over DAB+. The line-up has changed over the years, but every station is automated and commercial-free. The current stations are as follows:

- De Tijdloze: a non-stop music alternative classics
- Klara continuo: a non-stop classical music
- MNM Hits: a non-stop version of MNM
- Radio Bene: a non-stop music from Flemish artists
- VRT NWS: a non-stop loop of the latest Radio 1 news bulletin, updated every hour

=== Private radio ===
For decades, private entities were not legally allowed to operate radio stations in Flanders. Today, four types of radio stations are recognized by the Flemish broadcasting regulator: national, regional, local and other.

==== National broadcasters ====
The following radio stations currently have "national" coverage status, meaning their coverage area spans the entire Flemish Community.

| Station name | Format | Owner | Start |
|---|---|---|---|
| Qmusic | Contemporary hit radio | DPG Media | November 12th, 2001 |
| JOE | Adult contemporary | DPG Media | October 27, 2001 (initially as 4fm) |
| Willy | Electronic, rock and Pop music | DPG Media | October 11, 2019 |
| Nostalgie | Adult contemporary | Vlaanderen Eén | March 20, 2008 |
| NRJ België | Pop music | Vlaanderen Twee | September 3, 2018 |
| Nostalgie Plus | Oldies music | Vlaanderen Twee | May 17, 2021 |

The frequencies for Nostalgie were originally zoned for regional use. In March 2008, Antwerpen 1, Radio Go, Radio Mango and Radio Contact Vlaanderen jointly started broadcasting Nostalgie on their frequencies. On March 8, 2010, the station took over some of the frequencies of EXQI FM in Limburg. This effectively created a new national broadcaster.

==== Local broadcasters ====
Despite a significant amount of locally zoned FM frequencies, many local broadcast organizations choose to work together to form a network. Such a franchise is known as ketenradio (or "chain" radio station). The individual frequencies of a radio network usually broadcast exactly the same output, save for localized commercials and the occasional mandatory regional news bulletin. Examples of networked radio stations include:

- Family Radio (Dutch music; no relation to the religious radio network)
- Hit FM
- Radio FG
- Radio Maria (Catholic radio)
- TOPradio (dance)
- VBRO (Dutch music)

Independent local stations also exist, but are not as widespread. Examples include:

- Radio Centraal (Antwerp)
- Radio Scorpio (Leuven)
