= Rose d'Or =

International entertainment awards ceremony

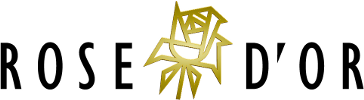
- Awarded for: Excellence in television
- Sponsored by: European Broadcasting Union (EBU)
- First award: 27 May 1961; 65 years ago
- Website: www.rosedor.com

The Rose d'Or ('Golden Rose') is an international awards festival in entertainment broadcasting and programming. The European Broadcasting Union (EBU) first acquired the Rose d'Or in 1961, when it was created by Swiss Television in the lakeside city of Montreux. The awards stayed with the EBU for almost 40 years. The EBU re-acquired the awards in 2013 and successfully re-launched the event that year in Brussels, then relocated to Berlin from 2014 to 2018.

In 2014 the event took place on 17 September in Berlin, Germany. For the first time in its 53-year history, the competition categories were extended to include radio and online video programmes in addition to the traditional focus on television. Producers, executives from independent and public service broadcasters and heads of production companies from several countries took part.

In 2019 the EBU partnered with international publishing company and digital channels business C21Media to take over the organisation of the Rose d'Or Awards. The 60th Rose d'Or was held virtually in November 2021.

== Format ==
Categories for the 2020 awards:

1. Comedy: scripted and non-scripted comedy shows including sketch shows, panel, improvisation, clips, comedy specials and stand-up. Series or single programmes.
2. Comedy Drama and Sitcom: scripted comedy series or one-off dramas, involving regular characters in various situations.
3. Drama: scripted series or one-off dramas involving characters in various situations. A main plot can be resolved within a single episode or over a series.
4. Soap or Telenovela: best multi-episode popular drama or melodrama, either on-going or limited run.
5. Reality and Factual Entertainment: programmes or series in which a situation or topic is treated or created through real people or which tell their story by following real-life characters.
6. Arts: programmes or series featuring performing arts and cultural programmes, stage recordings and television adaptations of performing arts or documentaries dedicated to art forms or artists.
7. Documentary: factual programme or series providing in-depth analysis of a specific subject or point of view supported by evidence and informed commentary, on any subject other than the Arts.
8. Studio Entertainment: studio-based game shows, variety shows, event series and specials.
9. Children and Youth: all genres produced for children and youth older than 6 years. Series or single programmes will be considered.
10. Social Media Video Series: original fiction or non-fiction short-form video series, (under a half an hour duration) that premiere on social, web, mobile and video platforms.
11. Audio Entertainment: scripted or unscripted original podcast, audio-first books and radio shows. Entries accepted from producers, platforms, distributors or talent.
12. Innovation in the time of Covid: Award for the programme or series, that, against all the odds, defined what television can achieve – and how television can be produced – in a time of unprecedented crisis.

In addition, the Rose d'Or recognises significant individual achievements by awarding one trophy each for:

- Emerging Talent Award: the Organiser, in consultation with the panel of judges, will present this award to a new talent who has made a breakthrough performance in a programme or series in the past year.
- Performance of the Year: the Organiser, in consultation with the panel of judges, will present this award to a personality who has made an outstanding performance in a programme or series in the past year.
- Lifetime Achievement: the Organiser, in consultation with the panel of judges will award the Lifetime Achievement to a personality who has made an outstanding and extensive contribution to the world of entertainment including, but not exclusively, their work in television, audio or online media.

The ultimate accolade for a programme or series, The Golden Rose, awarded to the programme, series or individual that, in the opinion of the judges, has made the outstanding contribution of 2020.

== History ==
The festival was founded by Marcel Bezençon, who was inspired by the need of what was then a small group of international colleagues to find programmes to fill their summer schedules. He had the idea that Switzerland could produce an entertainment programme, which could then be swapped with programmes from other national broadcasters. The festival was held in the spring to have programmes ready for broadcast in the summer, and the Golden Rose awards established as an extra incentive. As the festival grew, programme swaps ceased to be viable and the concept of the Film Kiosk was born. The awards became an important part of European television culture, and Golden Rose winners usually receive publicity in their home countries.

== Golden Rose winners ==
=== 1961–2003 ===
Year	Winner	Network	Country
1961	The Black and White Minstrel Show	BBC	United Kingdom
1962	Kaskad	SR	Sweden
1963	Julie and Carol at Carnegie Hall	CBS	United States
1964	Happy End	SSR / TSR	Switzerland
1965	The Cold Old Days	YLE	Finland
1966	L'Arroseur arrosé	ORTF	France
1967	The Frost Report	BBC	United Kingdom
1968	Historia de la frivolidad	TVE	Spain
1969	Holiday in Switzerland	SRG / SF DRS	Switzerland
1970	Les six évadés	ČST	Czechoslovakia
1971	Lodynski's Flohmarkt Company	ORF	Austria
1972	The Marty Feldman Comedy Machine	UKIB / ATV	United Kingdom
1973	The N.S.V.I.P.'s	SR TV1	Sweden
1974	Don Juan	TVE	Spain
1975	Fatti e Fattacci	RAI	Italy
1976	The Nor-Way to Broadcasting	NRK	Norway
1977	The Muppet Show	UKIB / ATV	United Kingdom
1978	The Shirley MacLaine Special – Where Do We Go From Here?	CBS	United States
1979	Rich Little's Christmas Carol	CBC	Canada
1980	Dream Weaver	CBC	Canada
1981	Mikhail Baryshnikov on Broadway	ABC	United States
1982	Dizzy Feet	UKIB / Central	United Kingdom
1983	Al Paradise	RAI	Italy
1984	I am a Hotel	CBC	Canada
1985	The Paul Daniels Magic Easter Show	BBC	United Kingdom
1986	Penn and Teller Go Public	CPB	United States
1987	The Prize	SVT	Sweden
1988	The Comic Strip Presents... The Strike	Channel 4	United Kingdom
1989	Hale & Pace	UKIB / LWT	United Kingdom
1990	Mr. Bean	UKIB / Thames	United Kingdom
1991	A Night on Mount Edna	LWT	United Kingdom
1992	Brian Orser: Night Moves	CBC	Canada
1993	The Kids in the Hall	Broadway	Canada
1994	Sevillanas	Sogepaq	Spain
1995	Don't Forget Your Toothbrush	Ginger / Channel 4	United Kingdom
1996	Itzhak Perlman – In the Fiddler's House	CPB	United States
1997	Cold Feet	Granada Television	United Kingdom
1998	Yo-Yo Ma Inspired by Bach	Rhombus	Canada
1999	The League of Gentlemen	BBC	United Kingdom
2000	The Mole	VRT	Belgium
2001	Lenny Henry in Pieces	Tiger Aspect / BBC	United Kingdom
2002	Pop Idol	Thames TV / ITV	United Kingdom
2003	Faking It	RDF Media / Channel 4	United Kingdom

=== 2004 ===
Category	Winner	Television network	Country
Arts & Specials	Amelia	Rhombus	Canada
Comedy	Creature Comforts	Aardman Animations / ITV	United Kingdom
Game Show	My New Best Friend	Tiger Aspect	United Kingdom
Music	One Bullet Left	SF DRS	Switzerland
Reality Show	Wife Swap	Channel 4	United Kingdom
Sitcom	Peep Show	Channel 4	United Kingdom
Soap	Saint Tropez (Sous le soleil)	Marathon	France
Variety	Ant and Dec's Saturday Night Takeaway	Granada Television	United Kingdom
Press Prize	Little Britain	BBC	United Kingdom
Paper format	From Rust to Riches	Team Gryttjom	Sweden
Pilot award	Fur TV	MTV	United Kingdom
Charity award	Peter Ustinov		United Kingdom
Honorary Rose	John de Mol		Netherlands
Best performances:
Comedy	F: Anke Engelke in Ladykracher	Brainpool / Sat.1	Germany
	M: Harry Hill in Harry Hill's TV Burp	Avalon	United Kingdom
Sitcom	F: Felicitas Woll in Berlin, Berlin	Studio Hamburg	Germany
	M: Martin Freeman in Hardware	Talkback Thames	United Kingdom
Soap	F: Bénédicte Delmas in Sous le soleil	Marathon	France
	M: Shane Richie in EastEnders	BBC	United Kingdom
Game show	Anthony McPartlin and Declan Donnelly in Ant and Dec's Saturday Night Takeaway	Granada Television	United Kingdom

=== 2005 ===
Category	Winner	Television network	Country
Arts & Specials	The Cost Of Living	DV8 Films	
Comedy	Little Britain	BBC	United Kingdom
Game Show	Test the Nation	Talent TV / BBC	United Kingdom
Music	Flashmob – The Opera	BBC	United Kingdom
Reality Show	Supernanny	Channel 4	United Kingdom
Sitcom	Nighty Night	BBC	United Kingdom
Soap	Verbotene Liebe	ARD	Germany
Variety	Strictly Come Dancing	BBC	United Kingdom
Press Prize	Schillerstraße	Hurricane Fernseh Productions	Germany
Paper format	Daycare Dilemma	SBS	Sweden
Pilot award	Dinner Dating	First Entertainment	Germany
Charity award	Bob Geldof		Ireland
Honorary Rose	Herbert Kloiber		Germany
Best performances:
Comedy	F: Pippa Haywood in Green Wing	Channel 4	United Kingdom
	M: David Walliams and Matt Lucas in Little Britain	BBC	United Kingdom
Sitcom	M: Peter Kay in Max & Paddy's Road to Nowhere	Channel 4	United Kingdom
	F: Zoë Wanamaker in My Family	BBC	United Kingdom
Soap	F: Lesley-Anne Down in The Bold and the Beautiful	CBS	United States
	M: Pat Nolan in Fair City	RTÉ	Ireland
Game show	Thomas Gottschalk in Wetten, dass..?		Germany

=== 2006 ===
Category	Winner	Television network / Production Company	Country
Arts & Specials	Girl in a Mirror	ABC TV	Australia
Comedy	Look Around You	BBC	United Kingdom
Game Show	Deal or No Deal	Channel 4	United Kingdom
Music	Gospel in Paradiso		Netherlands
Reality Show	The Apprentice	BBC	United Kingdom
Sitcom	Extras	BBC	United Kingdom
Soap	Verliebt in Berlin	Sat.1	Germany
Variety	Friday Night Project: Billie Piper	Channel 4	United Kingdom
Press Prize	Pastewka	Sat.1	Germany
Paper format			
Pilot award	Alex FM		Germany
Charity award	Fuji Television		Japan
Honorary Rose	Ricky Gervais		United Kingdom
Best performances:
Comedy	F: Jo Joyner in Swinging	Five	United Kingdom
	M: Chris Lilley in The Nominees	ABC	Australia
Sitcom	M: Bastian Pastewka in Pastewka	Sat.1	Germany
	F: Ashley Jensen in Extras	BBC	United Kingdom
Soap	F: Alexandra Neldel in Verliebt in Berlin	Sat.1	Germany
	M: Jack Wagner in The Bold and the Beautiful		United States
Game show	Stephen Fry in QI	BBC	United Kingdom
FRAPA Awards:
Scripted Format Award	The Nanny	Sony Pictures Television	United States
Game Show Format Award	Deal or No Deal	Endemol	Netherlands
Reality Format Award	The Biggest Loser	Reveille Productions	United States

=== 2007 ===
Category	Winner	Television network	Country
Arts Documentary	Young@Heart	Channel 4	United Kingdom
Comedy	The Vicar of Dibley	BBC	United Kingdom
Performing Arts	Peter and the Wolf	Channel 4	United Kingdom
Performing Arts: Special Mention	Car men	NPS	Netherlands
Reality	Secret Millionaire	Channel 4	United Kingdom
Reality: Special Mention	My Last Words	Palm Plus Productions	Netherlands
Show	The Pyramid	Castor Multimedia	Croatia
Sitcom	Not Going Out	BBC	United Kingdom
Soap	Con Passionate	S4C	United Kingdom
Soap: Special Mention	Home Affairs	SABC	South Africa
Best of 2007 Special Prize	Young@Heart	Channel 4	United Kingdom
Opera Special Prize	Man on the Moon	Channel 4	United Kingdom
Opera Special Prize: Special Mention	Mozart 22 - Le Nozze di Figaro	Unitel GmbH & Co KG	Germany
Honorary Rose	Ben Elton (Lifetime Achievement)		United Kingdom

=== 2008 ===
Category	Winner	Television network	Country
Arts Documentary	Strictly Bolshoi	Channel 4	United Kingdom
Comedy	Kombat Opera Presents	BBC Two	United Kingdom
Drama	Skins	E4	United Kingdom
Drama: Special Mention	The Street II	BBC	United Kingdom
Entertainment	Hider in the House	BBC Two	United Kingdom
Game Show	Power of 10	CBS	United States
Performing Arts	Mozart's Magic Flute - Onstage and Backstage	Schweizer Fernsehen	Switzerland
Reality	The Phone	AVRO	Netherlands
Sitcom	The IT Crowd	Channel 4	United Kingdom
Best Entertainer	Peter Serafinowicz	BBC Two	United Kingdom
Best of 2008	Kombat Opera Presents	BBC Two	United Kingdom

=== 2009 ===
Category	Winner	Television network	Country
Arts Documentary	The Mona Lisa Curse	Channel 4	United Kingdom
Comedy	Rick Mercer Report	CBC	Canada
Drama	Windfall & Misfortunes		Canada
Entertainment	El hormiguero	Cuatro	Spain
Game Show	Relentless	ITV	United Kingdom
Performing Arts	The Eternity Man	ABC Television	Australia
Performing Arts: Special Mention	La Traviata at Zurich Main Station		Switzerland
Reality	I Survived a Japanese Game Show	ABC	United States
Sitcom	My Family	BBC One	United Kingdom
Best of 2009	I Survived a Japanese Game Show	ABC	United States

=== 2010 ===
Category	Winner	Television network	Country
Arts Documentary & Performing Arts	The Neighbour	NRK	Norway
Comedy	Benidorm Bastards	VMMa	Belgium
Sitcom	The Inbetweeners	E4	United Kingdom
Drama & Mini Series	Hopeville		South Africa
Soap & Telenovela	Date Blind		Argentina/Switzerland
Children & Youth	Krimi.de – Web Attack		Germany
Variety & Live Event Show	La Bohème at the Tower Block		Switzerland
Game Show	Bingo Banko	TV2	Denmark
Reality & Factual Entertainment	Blood, Sweat and Takeaways	BBC	United Kingdom
Multi-Platform	Águila Roja	RTVE	Spain
Social Awards	Desert Tears		Germany
Social Awards	Sofa Surfers	BBC	United Kingdom

=== 2012 ===
Category	Winner	Television network	Country
Arts Documentary & Performing Arts	The Sound of Ole Bull	NRK	Norway
Comedy	Black Mirror: "The National Anthem"	Channel 4	United Kingdom
Sitcom	Friday Night Dinner	Channel 4	United Kingdom
Series	Pan Am	ABC	United States
TV movie	Homevideo	NDR	Germany
Children	Horrible Histories	BBC	United Kingdom
Youth	Dream High	KBS	South Korea
Live Event Show	Eurovision Song Contest 2011	ARD	Germany
Game Show	The Million Pound Drop Live	Channel 4	United Kingdom
Factual Entertainment	Go Back To Where You Came From	SBS	Australia
Lifestyle	The Great British Bake Off	BBC	United Kingdom
Multi-Platform	Plan B	Antena 3	Spain
Best of Rose 2012	Go Back To Where You Came From	SBS	Australia

=== 2013 ===
Category	Winner	Television network	Country
Comedy	What if?	VMMa	Belgium
Sitcom	Spy	BSkyB	United Kingdom
Game Show	Oh Sit!	The CW	United States
Arts	Freddie Mercury: The Great Pretender	BBC	United Kingdom
Reality & Factual Entertainment	Make Bradford British	Channel 4	United Kingdom
Entertainment	Gruen Sweat	ABC	Australia

=== 2014 ===
Category	Winner	Network	Country
Comedy	Little Mom	Dori Media Group	Israel
Sitcom	Toast of London	Channel 4	United Kingdom
Game Show	Pointless	BBC	United Kingdom
Arts	Peter and the Wolf/Pierre et le Loup	Camera Lucida Productions	France
Reality & Factual Entertainment	Gogglebox	Channel 4	United Kingdom
Entertainment	Circus HalliGalli	ProSiebenSat.1 Media	Germany

=== 2015 ===
Category	Winner	Network	Country
Comedy	Psychobitches	Sky Arts	United Kingdom
Sitcom	Catastrophe	Channel 4	United Kingdom
Radio Comedy	Newsjack	BBC Radio 4 Extra	United Kingdom
Game Show	Wild Things	Sky One	United Kingdom
Arts	Our Gay Wedding: The Musical	Channel 4	United Kingdom
Reality & Factual Entertainment	Street Jungle	Canal D	Canada
Entertainment	The Graham Norton Show	BBC	United Kingdom

=== 2016 ===
Category	Winner	Network	Country
Comedy	Inside No. 9	BBC Two	United Kingdom
Sitcom	Raised by Wolves	Channel 4	United Kingdom
Game Show	Pick Me!	ITV	United Kingdom
Reality & Factual Entertainment	The Real Marigold Hotel	BBC Two	United Kingdom
Entertainment	Eurovision Song Contest 2016	SVT	Sweden
Drama	River	BBC One	United Kingdom

=== 2017 ===
Category	Winner	Network	Country
Comedy	Fleabag	BBC One	United Kingdom
Sitcom	Henry IX	Gold	United Kingdom
Game Show	Bigheads	ITV	United Kingdom
Reality & Factual Entertainment	You Can't Ask That	ABC iview	Australia
Entertainment	Stasera casa Mika	Rai 2	Italy
Drama	Nobel	NRK	Norway
Children & Youth	Anti Bully Club	Skyhigh TV	Netherlands
Arts	Balletboyz	BBC Two	United Kingdom
TV movie	The Verdict	ARD	Germany
Entertainer of the Year	James Corden	—N/a	United Kingdom
Lifetime Achievement Award	Angela Lansbury	—N/a	United Kingdom

=== 2018 ===
Category	Winner	Network	Country
Comedy	Grotesco's Seven Masterpieces – The Refugee Crisis: a musical	SVT	Sweden
Sitcom	Detectorists	BBC Four	United Kingdom
Drama	The Crown	Netflix	United Kingdom
Limited Series and TV Movie	A Very English Scandal	BBC One	United Kingdom
Augmented Reality & Virtual Reality	Damming the Nile	BBC News	United Kingdom
Reality & Factual Entertainment	Down the Road	VRT	Belgium
Arts	Betroffenheit	BBC Four	United Kingdom
Game Show	Sorry voor alles	VRT	Belgium
Entertainment	Roberto Bolle – Danza con me	Rai 1	Italy
Children & Youth	The Highway Rat	BBC One	United Kingdom
Entertainer of the Year	Jan Böhmermann	—N/a	Germany
Lifetime Achievement Award	Joanna Lumley	—N/a	United Kingdom

=== 2019 ===
Category	Winner	Network	Country
Soap or Telenovela	Orphans of a Nation	Globo	Brazil
Children & Youth	ZombieLars	NRK	Norway
Arts	The Greenaway Alphabet	NTR	Netherlands
Audio Entertainment	13 Minutes to the Moon	BBC World Service	United Kingdom
Social Media Video Series	SWIPE	NPO 3	Netherlands
Studio Entertainment	Michael McIntyre's Big Show	BBC One	United Kingdom
Comedy	Baroness von Sketch Show	CBC	Canada
Reality and Factual Entertainment	The Repair Shop	BBC Two	United Kingdom
Comedy Drama and Sitcom	Arde Madrid	Movistar+	Spain
Drama	Chernobyl	Sky UK/HBO	United Kingdom/United States
Golden Rose	Chernobyl	Sky UK/HBO	United Kingdom/United States
Performance of the Year	Ricky Gervais for After Life	Netflix	United Kingdom
Lifetime Achievement Award	Maren Kroymann	—N/a	Germany

=== 2020 ===
Category	Winner	Network	Country
Comedy	Woke	Hulu	United States
Comedy Drama and Sitcom	Sex Education	Netflix	United Kingdom/United States
Drama	Babylon Berlin	Sky Deutschland	Germany
Soap or Telenovela	Victoria Small	Telefe	Argentina
Reality and Factual Entertainment	The School That Tried To End Racism	Channel 4	United Kingdom
Documentary	Once Upon a Time in Iraq	BBC Two	United Kingdom
Golden Rose	Once Upon a Time in Iraq	BBC Two	United Kingdom
Arts	Wim Wenders, Desperado	ARD	Germany
Studio Entertainment	The Wonderbox	France 3	France
Children & Youth	First Day	ABC	Australia
Social Media Video Series	Content	ABC	Australia
Innovation in the Time of Covid	Homefest: James Corden's Late Late Show Special	CBS	United States
Audio Entertainment	Tunnel 29	BBC Radio 4	United Kingdom
Lifetime Achievement Award	David Attenborough	—N/a	United Kingdom
Emerging Talent Award	Daisy Edgar-Jones for Normal People	BBC Three	United Kingdom

=== 2021 ===
Category	Winner	Network	Country
Soap or Telenovela	Two Lives/Dos vidas	RTVE	Spain
Children & Youth	Horrible Histories Black History Special	CBBC	United Kingdom
Studio Entertainment	Strictly Come Dancing	BBC One	United Kingdom
Comedy	Bo Burnham: Inside	Netflix	United States
Audio Entertainment	I'm Not a Monster	BBC Sounds/BBC Radio 5 Live/BBC Panorama/Frontline PBS	United Kingdom
Arts	Firestarter – The Story of Bangarra	ABC	Australia
News and Current Affairs	Storming the Capitol: The Inside Story	Apple TV+/BBC One	United Kingdom
Golden Rose	Storming the Capitol: The Inside Story	Apple TV+/BBC One	United Kingdom
Multiplatform Series	InterConnected: Fred Gets Feedback	BBC	United Kingdom
Comedy Drama and Sitcom	Call My Agent!	Netflix/France Télévisions	France
Reality and Factual Entertainment	Long Lost Family: Born Without Trace	ITV	United Kingdom
Documentary	9/11: Inside the President's War Room	Apple TV+/BBC One	United Kingdom
Drama	Help	Channel 4	United Kingdom
Lifetime Achievement Award	Brenda Blethyn	—N/a	United Kingdom
Performance of the Year	Omar Sy for Lupin	Netflix	France
Emerging Talent Award	Nida Manzoor for We Are Lady Parts	Channel 4	United Kingdom

=== 2022 ===
The nominations were announced on 4 November 2022. The ceremony was held on 28 November 2022 and presented by Alex Horne.

The winners are listed first and highlighted in boldface.

Soap or Telenovela	Children and Youth
**Casualty (BBC One) (United Kingdom)**‡; District 31 (Ici Radio-Canada Télé) (Canada); EastEnders (BBC One) (United Kingdom); Life Is Life (TVI) (Portugal); Pantanal (TV Globo) (Brazil); Where It All Begins (TF1) (France)	**Talking Heads (VPRO) (Netherlands)**‡; Cop26: In Your Hands (Sky Kids) (United Kingdom); Dodger (BBC One) (United Kingdom); Het Klokhuis – Your body belongs to you (NPO Zapp) (Netherlands); Hi, I've Got Cancer (NPO 1) (Netherlands); Malory Towers (CBBC) (Canada)
Multiplatform Series	Comedy
**Stop It Now (NPO Zapp) (Netherlands)**‡; The Big Proud Party Agency (BBC Three) (Ireland); Corpse Talk (YouTube Originals) (United Kingdom); Emma lügt (Play Suisse) (Switzerland); Gassed Up (BBC Three) (United Kingdom); War Stories II (NPO Zapp) (Netherlands)	**Toast of Tinseltown (BBC Two) (United Kingdom)**‡; As Seguidoras (Paramount+) (Brazil); Bloods (Sky Comedy) (United Kingdom); La Flamme (Canal+) (France); Lust (HBO Max) (Sweden); UFOs (Canal+) (France)
Documentary	News and Current Affairs
**The Real Mo Farah (BBC One) (United Kingdom)**‡; Dinosaurs: The Final Day with David Attenborough (BBC One) (United Kingdom); Jimmy Savile: A British Horror Story (Netflix) (United Kingdom); My Childhood, My Country – 20 Years In Afghanistan (WDR/Arte) (Germany/France); The Tinder Swindler (Netflix) (United States); Ukraine: Life Under Attack (Channel 4) (United Kingdom)	**Afghanistan: No Country for Women (ITV) (United Kingdom)**‡; China: The Search for the Missing (Channel 4) (United Kingdom); Myanmar: The Forgotten Revolution (Channel 4/Amazon Prime Video) (United Kingdom); On the Frontline. Fleeing Irpin and The Defenders of Kharkiv (TVN24) (Poland); Panorama: SAS Death Squads Exposed (BBC) (United Kingdom); Rape: Who's on Trial? (Channel 4) (United Kingdom)
Audio Entertainment	Arts
**Pillow Talk (Audible/Easy Tiger) (Australia)**‡; Dear Daughter (BBC World Service) (United Kingdom); The Greatest Menace: Inside the Gay Prison Experiment (Audible) (Australia); Kuper Island (CBC Podcasts) (Canada); SRF Podcast: Grauen: «The Night Train» (SRF) (Switzerland); Who Killed Daphne? (Wondery) (United Kingdom)	**Freddie Mercury: The Final Act (BBC Two) (United Kingdom)**‡; The Boy Who Can't Stop Dancing (Channel 4) (United Kingdom); The Most Beautiful Boy in the World (SVT2) (Sweden); My Life as a Rolling Stone (BBC Two) (United Kingdom); My Name Is Gulpilil (ABC) (Australia); Steps of Freedom (RTÉ) (Ireland)
Reality and Factual Entertainment	Studio Entertainment
**De Verraders (RTL 4) (Netherlands)**‡; The Dog House (Channel 4) (United Kingdom); Freddie Flintoff's Field of Dreams (BBC One) (United Kingdom); Freeze the Fear with Wim Hof (BBC One) (United Kingdom); Life on the Outside (SBS) (Australia); Old People's Home for Teenagers (ABC) (Australia)	**The Musical for Your Life (Play4) (Belgium)**‡; 99 – Eine:r schlägt sie alle! (Sat.1) (Germany); Holey Moley (ABC) (United States); I Literally Just Told You (Channel 4) (United Kingdom); Stealing the Show (ProSieben) (Germany); That's My Jam (NBC) (United States)
Comedy Drama and Sitcom	Drama
**The Great (Hulu) (United States)**‡; Hacks (HBO Max) (United States); Heartstopper (Netflix) (United Kingdom); The Outlaws (BBC One) (United Kingdom); Sort Of (CBC Television) (Canada); Walk-In (Ici TOU.TV) (Canada)	**Succession (HBO) (United States)**‡; Borgen – Power & Glory (DR/Netflix) (Denmark); The Offer (Paramount+) (United States); Pachinko (Apple TV+) (South Korea); State of Happiness (NRK) (Norway); This Is Going to Hurt (BBC One) (United Kingdom)
Performance of the Year	Emerging Talent Award
**Sidse Babett Knudsen as Birgitte Nyborg Christensen – Borgen – Power & Glory (DR/Netflix) (Denmark)**‡	**Yasmin Finney as Elle Argent – Heartstopper (Netflix) (United Kingdom)**‡
Lifetime Achievement Award
**Brian Cox**

=== 2023 ===
The nominations were announced on 6 November 2023. The ceremony was held at the Kings Place in London and hosted by David Baddiel on 27 November 2023.

The winners are listed first and highlighted in boldface.

Soap or Telenovela	Children and Youth
**Another Love (Bambaşka Biri) (Fox) (Turkey)**; All the Flowers (Globoplay) (Brazil); EastEnders (BBC One) (United Kingdom); The Vow (RTVE) (Spain); The Crown of the Kings. The Jagiellonians (TVP1) (Poland); Trentenaires (Tipik) (Belgium)	**Dome 16 (NRK) (Norway)**; A Kind of Spark (CBBC) (United Kingdom); BooSnoo! (Sky Kids) (United Kingdom); Kizazi Moto: Generation Fire (Disney+) (United States / South Africa / Nigeria); Lovely Little Farm (Apple TV+) (United States); The Smeds and The Smoos (BBC One) (United Kingdom)
Multiplatform Series	Comedy Entertainment
**Capture: Who's Looking After the Children? (United Kingdom)**; Appetite (Australia); GALWAD (United Kingdom); Krystal Klairvoyant (Australia); The New Vermeer (Netherlands); Season of Sex (Belgium)	**A Whole Lifetime with Jamie Demetriou (Netflix) (United Kingdom)**; German Genius (WarnerTV Comedy) (Germany); Gregg Wallace: The British Miracle Meat (Channel 4) (United Kingdom); Hold the Front Page (Sky Max) (United Kingdom); Prince Andrew: The Musical (Channel 4) (United Kingdom); Taskmaster (Channel 4) (United Kingdom)
Documentary	News and Current Affairs
**The Man Who Played with Fire (Sky Documentaries) (United Kingdom)**; Evacuation (Channel 4) (United Kingdom); Fledglings (TVP1) (Poland); Once Upon a Time in Northern Ireland (BBC Two) (United Kingdom); The Price of Truth (Channel 4) (United Kingdom); Wild Isles (BBC One) (United Kingdom)	**Children of the Taliban (Channel 4) (Germany)**; The Crossing (ITV) (United Kingdom); Inside Russia: Putin's War at Home (ITV) (United Kingdom); The Last Hospital: 30 Days in Myanmar (Sky Documentaries) (United Kingdom); Ukraine's War Diaries (BBC One) (United Kingdom); Undercover: Sexual Harassment – The Truth (Channel 4) (United Kingdom)
Audio Entertainment	Arts
**The Shamima Begum Story (BBC Sounds/BBC Radio 5 Live) (United Kingdom)**; Acid Dream: The Great LSD Plot (BBC Sounds) (United Kingdom); Love, Janessa (CBC Podcasts) (Canada); The Prince (United Kingdom); Shock and War: Iraq 20 Years On (BBC Radio 4) (United Kingdom); The Sound: Mystery of Havana Syndrome (United Kingdom)	**Nothing Compares (Sky Documentaries) (United Kingdom)**; Andrea Bocelli: The Journey (Sky Arts) (United Kingdom); Becoming Frida Kahlo (BBC Two) (United Kingdom); Inside My Heart (NPO) (Netherlands); Knowing the Score (ABC) (Australia); Sergio Leone: The Italian Who Invented America (Sky Documentaries) (Italy)
Factual Entertainment and Reality	Studio Entertainment
**Justice in Jail (Play4) (Belgium)**; The Black Forest Deer – An Extraordinary Kitchen Crew and Tim Mälzer (VOX) (Germany); The Gentle Art of Swedish Death Cleaning (Peacock) (United States); Married at First Sight (E4) (United Kingdom); My Mum, Your Dad (ITV1) (United Kingdom); Wonders of the World I Can't See (Channel 4) (United Kingdom)	**The 1% Club (ITV1) (United Kingdom)**; I Can See Your Voice (Mnet) (South Korea); Late Night Lycett (Channel 4) (United Kingdom); Raid the Cage Mexico (Azteca Uno) (Mexico); RuPaul's Drag Race UK (BBC Three) (United Kingdom); Michael McIntyre's The Wheel (BBC One) (United Kingdom)
Comedy Drama and Sitcom	Drama
**Parlement (Season 2) (France Télévisions) (France / Germany / Belgium)**; About Antoine (TVA) (Canada); Colin from Accounts (Binge/Foxtel) (Australia); Heartstopper (Netflix) (United Kingdom); The Orchestra (DR1) (Denmark); Poker Face (Peacock) (United States)	**The White Lotus (Season 2) (HBO) (United States)**; The Good Mothers (Disney+) (Italy); I Hate Suzie (Sky Atlantic) (United Kingdom); The Last of Us (HBO) (United States); Silo (Apple TV+) (United States); Somewhere Boy (Channel 4) (United Kingdom)
Competition Reality	Performance of the Year
**Destination X (VTM) (Belgium)**; The Devil's Lot: So Help Me Cod! (Historia) (Canada); Stars on Mars (Fox) (United States); The Piano (Channel 4) (United Kingdom); Tempting Fortune (Channel 4) (United Kingdom); Wedding Fighters (tvN) (South Korea)	**Sarah Lancashire as Sgt Catherine Cawood – Happy Valley (BBC One) (United Kingdom)**
Emerging Talent	Lifetime Achievement
**Ayo Edebiri as Sydney Adamu – The Bear (Hulu) (United States)**	**Josée Dayan (France)**

=== 2024 ===
The nominations were announced on 11 November 2024. The ceremony was held at the Kings Place in London and hosted by Sophie Duker on 2 December 2024.

The winners are listed first and highlighted in boldface.

Soap or Telenovela	Children and Youth
**Dertigers 2 (VRT 1) (Belgium)**; EastEnders (BBC One) (United Kingdom); Hollyoaks (Channel 4) (United Kingdom); Rebirth (Renascer) (TV Globo) (Brazil); Wyfie (Showmax) (South Africa); Yabani (NOW) (Turkey)	**Bluey (ABC) (Australia)**; Escape from Albatros (NPO 3) (Netherlands); I am Invisible (NPO Zapp) (Netherlands); Superhero Academy (NRK Super) (Norway); Tabby McTat (BBC One) (United Kingdom); The Sound Collector (ITV) (United Kingdom)
Multiplatform	Comedy Entertainment
**Democracy (Financial Times) (United Kingdom)**; 9 Feestjes voor de kater (VRT) (Belgium); Itsatsita (EITB) (Spain); Not Done – Robin (NPO Zapp) (Netherlands); Processes (Belsat TV) (Belgium); The Disposables (ABC) (Australia)	**Taskmaster (Channel 4) (United Kingdom)**; Die Carolin Kekekus Show (WDR) (Germany); Norway’s Dumbest (TV2 Norway) (Norway); Rob & Romesh vs F1 Monaco (Sky Max) (United Kingdom); Thank God You’re Here (Network 10) (Australia); The Skewer: Three Twisted Years (BBC iPlayer) (United Kingdom)
Documentary	News and Current Affairs
Otto Baxter: Not A F***ing Horror Story (Sky Documentaries) (United Kingdom); Hell Jumper (BBC One) (United Kingdom); Inside Iran: The Fight For Freedom (Exposure) (ITV1) (United Kingdom); The Occupiers (Arte) (France); Ukraine: Enemy in the Woods (BBC Two) (United Kingdom); You Are Not Alone: Fighting the Wolfpack (Netflix) (Spain)	**Ukraine’s War: The Other Side (ITV1) (United Kingdom)**; Israel and Gaza: Into the Abyss (ITV1) (United Kingdom); Putin’s Bears – The world’s most dangerous hackers (SWR) (Germany); Sarah Everard – The Search for Justice (BBC) (United Kingdom); Sudan – War at Home (Sky News) (United Kingdom); The Fraudsters (SVT1) (Sweden)
Audio	Arts
**Batavia (Humo) (Belgium)**; Cocaine Inc (The Sunday Times) (Australia); Ghost Story (Wondery) (United Kingdom); My Dream Dinner Party (Tuning Fork Productions) (United Kingdom); Sara’s Mysteries – Grandpa’s violin (NTR) (Netherlands); World of Secrets: The Disciples (BBC World Service) (United Kingdom)	**Ryuichi Sakamoto: Last Days (NHK) (Japan)**; Chantal Akerman: Always on the Go (VRT Canvas) (Belgium); Mozart – Rise of A Genius (BBC) (United Kingdom); Royal Swedish Opera: Mikael Karlsson: Melancholia (SVT) (Sweden); The Greatest Night in Pop (Netflix) (USA); The Pilgrimage of Gilbert and George (Sky Arts) (United Kingdom)
Factual Entertainment and Reality	Studio Entertainment
**Niks Te Zien (Nothing to See) (VRT 1) (Belgium)**; Better Date than Never (ABC Television) (Australia); Love is Blind: UK (Netflix) (United Kingdom); Stuff The British Stole (ABC Australia) (Australia); The Jury: Murder Trial (Channel 4) (United Kingdom); The Political Assembly (Het Conclaaf) (VTM) (Belgium)	**Gladiators (ITV1) (BBC One) (United Kingdom)**; Britain’s Got Talent (ITV) (United Kingdom); Couple Palace (Mnet) (Republic of Korea); Mental Masters (Telecinco) (Spain); The Floor (FOX) (Ireland); Who Wants to Be A Millionaire (US) (ABC) (USA)
Comedy Drama and Sitcom	Drama
**Dates in Real Life (NRK) (Norway)**; Kaos (Netflix) (United Kingdom); Population 11 (Stan) (United Kingdom); The Gentlemen (Netflix) (United Kingdom); We Are Lady Parts (Season 2) (Peacock) (United Kingdom); What Happened to Solveig (NRK) (Norway)	**Baby Reindeer (Netflix) (United Kingdom)**; After the Party (TVNZ) (New Zealand); Mr Bates vs The Post Office (ITV1) (United Kingdom); Pachinko (Apple TV+) (Republic of Korea); The Sixth Commandment (BBC) (United Kingdom); The Sympathizer (HBO) (Thailand)
Competition Reality	Performance of the Year
**Squid Game: The Challenge (Netflix) (United Kingdom)**; Race Across the World (BBC One) (United Kingdom); Spillet (The Game) (TV2 Norway) (Norway); The Anonymous (USA Network) (United Kingdom); The Voice of The Country (TVP) (Poland)	**Gary Oldman as Jackson Lamb – Slow Horses (Apple TV+) (United Kingdom)**
Emerging Talent	Lifetime Achievement
**Ambika Mod as Emma Morley – One Day (Netflix) (United Kingdom)**	**Rosario Fiorello (Italy)**

=== 2025 ===
The nominations were announced on 17 November 2025. The ceremony was held at the Kings Place in London and hosted by Dara Ó Briain on 1 December 2025.

The winners are listed first and highlighted in boldface.

Golden Rose
**Adolescence (Netflix) (United Kingdom)**
Soap or Telenovela	Children and Youth
**Guerreiros do Sol (Love is a Knife) (Globoplay) (Brazil)**; Crystal Wall (ZDF) (Germany); EastEnders (BBC One) (United Kingdom); Eshref Ruya (Kanal D) (Türkiye); Life Happens (VTM) (Belgium); Valle Salvaje (La 1) (Spain)	**Tiddler (BBC One) (United Kingdom)**; Bottled Up (NPO Zapp) (Netherlands); Crongton (BBC) (United Kingdom); Je Zal Het Maar Hebben Junior (Imagine Living With That) (NPO Zapp) (Netherlands); The Night Before Christmas in Wonderland (Sky Cinema) (United Kingdom); Wat niemand ziet (My Unseen Story) (Ketnet) (Belgium)
Multiplatform	Comedy Entertainment
**Oorlogsdetective (NPO Zapp) (Netherlands)**; Guardians (BBC Earth Youtube Channel) (United Kingdom); In Form (VRT MAX) (Belgium); No Big Deal (Czech Television) (Czech Republic); Red Flag (VRT MAX) (Belgium); Te Beberi (SRF 1) (Switzerland)	**Ants (Nippon TV/Fremantle) (Japan)**; Have You Been Paying Attention? (Network Ten) (Australia); Last One Laughing UK (Prime Video) (United Kingdom); Mitchell & Webb Are Not Helping (Channel 4) (United Kingdom); Rob vs Romesh (Sky Max) (United Kingdom); The Ultimate Celebrity Car Park Showdown (Play) (Belgium)
Documentary	News and Current Affairs
**Louis Theroux – The Settlers (BBC Two) (United Kingdom)**; AI Love You (TV 2) (Denmark); Atomic People (BBC) (United Kingdom); Deaf President Now! (Apple TV) (USA); Grenfell Uncovered (Netflix) (United Kingdom); The Zelensky Story (BBC Two) (United Kingdom)	**We Will Dance Again (Hot 8/Paramount+/BBC) (Israel)**; Blood Parliament (BBC Africa Eye) (United Kingdom); Deep Deception (ITV) (United Kingdom); State of Rage (Channel 4) (Israel); UVDA, The Lost Images of Be’ri (Keshet 12) (Israel); Van Gent tot Damascus (From Ghent to Damascus) (VRT Canvas) (Belgium)
Audio	Arts
**The Ballad of Scout and the Alcohol Tag (Prison Radio Association) (United Kingdom)**; Fool’s Gold (BBC Studios) (United Kingdom); Missing in the Amazon (The Guardian) (United Kingdom/Brazil); Stalked (BBC Studios) (United Kingdom); Up In Smoke (Penny4 (United Kingdom); Where is Jon (RÚV/RTÉ) (Iceland/Ireland)	**Soundtrack to a Coup d’Etat (VRT Canvas) (Belgium)**; Draw For Change (VRT Canvas) (Belgium); Mozart’s Sister (Sky Arts) (United Kingdom/Australia); The Last Musician of Auschwitz (BBC) (United Kingdom); The Legends of Paris, a tale of the 19th century artistic scene (ARTE France) (France); The Lost Music of Auschwitz (Sky Arts) (United Kingdom)
Factual Entertainment and Reality	Studio Entertainment
**The Jury: Murder Trial (Channel 4) (United Kingdom)**; Back to the Frontier (HBO Max/Magnolia Network) (United Kingdom); Mijn jeugdrechter (Return to the Youth Court) (VRT Canvas) (Belgium); Scam Interceptors (BBC One) (United Kingdom); Sort Your Life Out (BBC One) (United Kingdom)	**A League of Their Own (Sky Max) (United Kingdom)**; Gelukkig gescheiden (Happily Divorced) (VRT 1) (Belgium); Lass Dich Überwachen (ZDF) (Germany); Michael McIntyre’s The Wheel (BBC One) (United Kingdom); Parents Evening (ITV1) (United Kingdom); Switch (VRT 1) (Belgium)
Comedy Drama and Sitcom	Drama
**The Studio (Apple TV) (USA)**; Big Boys (Channel 4) (United Kingdom/Malta); Happiness (ThreeNow) (New Zealand); Pushers (Channel 4) (United Kingdom); The Boys (Prime Video) (USA); Whisky On The Rocks (Disney+/Sveriges Television) (Lithuania/Sweden)	**Adolescence (Netflix) (United Kingdom)**; Empathy (Canal+) (Canada); Reunion (BBC/Paramount+/Showtime/CBC) (United Kingdom); The Penguin (HBO Max) (USA); What it Feels Like for a Girl (BBC Three) (United Kingdom); Wolf Hall (The Mirror and the Light) (BBC Two/PBS) (United Kingdom)
Competition Reality	Performance of the Year
**The Box (TV 2) (Norway)**; Alone Australia (SBS On Demand) (Australia); Building The Band (Netflix) (United Kingdom); Kitchen Impossible (VOX) (Germany); The Fortune Hotel (ITV) (United Kingdom/Norway/Sweden); The Piano (Channel 4) (United Kingdom)	**Ensemble cast – Furia (Rage) (HBO) (Spain)**
Emerging Talent	Lifetime Achievement
**Owen Cooper as Jamie Miller – Adolescence (Netflix) (United Kingdom)**	**Anne Reid (United Kingdom)**

=== 2026 ===
The nominations were announced on 10 November 2026. The ceremony was held at the Kings Place in London and hosted by Ania Magliano on 30 November 2026.

The winners are listed first and highlighted in boldface.

Soap or Telenovela	Children and Youth
Amor à Prova (TVI) (Portugal); Corriedale (ITV1/ITVX) (United Kingdom); Deep in Love (Taşacak Bu Deniz) (TRT 1) (Türkiye); Different Lives (ATV) (Türkiye); Sins and Roses (Kanal D) (Türkiye); To Love is to Care (Quem Ama Cuida) (TV Globo) (Brazil)	Chameleon (NRK) (Norway); Crookhaven (CBBC) (United Kingdom); Dexter Procter The Ten-Year-Old Doctor (CBBC) (United Kingdom); Quest Heroes (DR Ramasjang) (Denmark); Tales From Outer Suburbia (BYUtv) (Australia); The Scarecrows' Wedding (BBC One) (United Kingdom)
Multiplatform Series	Comedy Entertainment
Big Sister's Advice: Puberty (Conseils de grande soeur: la puberté) (Radio-Canada) (Canada); Homebodies (SBS) (Australia); On Top of the World Tree: Origins and Beyond (OTT) (China); Recall Me Maybe (Financial Times) (United Kingdom); TERRAIN - Battle of the Flags (ZDF) (Germany); The Last Summer (KRO-NCRV/NPO Zapp) (Netherlands)	Don't Panic! (VRT 1) (Belgium); Last One Laughing UK (Series 2) (Prime Video) (United Kingdom); Rundfunk: Schwalbe (NPO 3/NPO Start) (Netherlands); Saturday Night Live UK (Sky One) (United Kingdom); The 00s for Teenagers (De jaren 00 voor tieners) (VRT) (Belgium); Zero Stars (TLC) (United Kingdom)
Documentary	News and Current Affairs
70 Up (ITV1/ITVX) (United Kingdom); Evolution (BBC Two) (United Kingdom); Inside Iran: War & Revolution (ITV) (United Kingdom); Milou's Battle Continues (NPO 2) (Netherlands); The Darkest Web (BBC Four - Storyville) (United Kingdom); The Deal with Iran (VRT Canvas) (Belgium)	Code of Misconduct (Super Channel) (Canada); Hila Beyond the Taliban (AVROTROS) (Netherlands); Into the Void: Putin's Foreign Fighters (BBC) (United Kingdom); Panorama: Undercover in the Police (BBC One) (United Kingdom); Shot Like Enemies: Inside Nepal's Gen Z Uprising (BBC World Service) (United Kingdom); Will AI Take My Job? (Dispatches) (Channel 4) (United Kingdom)
Audio	Arts
First Conviction (RTÉ) (Ireland); Hometown Boys (ABC) (Australia); Hunting the Suicide Salesman (CBC) (Canada); I'm Not A Monster Presents... Where Is Austin Tice? (BBC/NPR) (United Kingdom); Roles to Play (NTR) (Netherlands); The Birth Keepers (The Guardian) (United Kingdom)	Farruquito, a Flamenco Dynasty (Movistar Plus+) (Spain); Free Nelson Mandela - Episode 3: The Whole World Is Watching (Channel 4) (United Kingdom); LS Lowry: The Unheard Tapes (BBC Two) (United Kingdom); One Shot with Ed Sheeran: A Music Experience (Netflix) (USA); Tea with Judi Dench featuring Sir Ian McKellen (Sky Arts) (United Kingdom); The Force of Destiny (RAI/France Télévisions)
Factual Entertainment and Reality	Studio Entertainment
Building Sweden (Så byggdes Sverige) (SVT) (Sweden); Educating Yorkshire (Channel 4) (United Kingdom); Marshmallow Counseling (SBS) (South Korea); Stuff the British Stole (ABC) (Australia); Tattoorist (VRT Canvas) (Belgium); The Grand Tour (Prime Video) (United Kingdom)	Mission Accomplished? (VRT) (Belgium); Parents' Evening (ITV) (United Kingdom); Stacks of Cash (TVI) (Portugal); The Way Out (VTM (DPG Media)) (Belgium); Who's Guilty (DR) (Denmark); Wisdom of the Crowd (BBC) (United Kingdom
Comedy Drama and Sitcom	Drama
Amandaland (BBC) (United Kingdom); Colin From Accounts (Season 3) (Foxtel) (Australia); Margo's Got Money Troubles (Apple TV) (USA); Small Prophets (BBC Two) (United Kingdom); The Gentlemen (Netflix) (United Kingdom); Widow's Bay (Apple TV) (USA)	Burden of Justice (SVT) (Sweden); Dirty Business (Channel 4) (United Kingdom); Half Man (BBC/HBO) (United Kingdom); Pluribus (Apple TV) (USA); The Man Who Carried the Voices of August (NHK General TV) (Japan); Trespasses (Channel 4) (United Kingdom)
Competition Reality	Performance of the Year
Alone (Alene i vildmarken) (DR) (Denmark); Celebrity Race Across the World (BBC One) (United Kingdom); DUAL² (TV Asahi Corporation) (Japan); Reality Queens in the Jungle: The Family Edition (Videoland) (Netherlands); Street Restaurant Fighter (tvN) (South Korea); The Celebrity Traitors (BBC One) (United Kingdom)	?
Emerging Talent	Lifetime Achievement
?	?
