= Geertrui Mieke De Ketelaere =

Belgian engineer and author (born 1970)

- De Ketelaere in 2026
- Born: 1970 (age 55–56)
- Education: Industrial engineering (Katholieke Hogeschool Sint-Lieven, Ghent); MSc Engineering Cybernetics (University of Stuttgart)
- Occupations: Engineer * Adjunct professor * Author
- Employer: Vlerick Business School
- Website: www.gmdeketelaere.com

Geertrui Mieke De Ketelaere (born 1970) is a Belgian engineer and author who works on artificial intelligence (AI). She is an adjunct professor at Vlerick Business School and advises companies as an independent strategic advisor on ethical, trustworthy and sustainable AI. Between 2019 and 2023 she worked at the research and development organisation IMEC. Since 2023 she has also campaigned on the risks of chatbots, in particular the dependence they can create in users. Her 2026 book The Chatbot Trap deals with the subject.

== Early life and education ==
De Ketelaere is from Ghent. She studied mechatronics at the Katholieke Hogeschool Sint-Lieven in the city, now part of KU Leuven, and qualified as an industrial engineer in 1992. Two years later she completed a master's degree in engineering cybernetics at the University of Stuttgart, where she specialised in robotics and AI.

She then started a PhD on AI in healthcare in Auckland, New Zealand. The system she built was meant to indicate when labour should be induced. By her account, the doctors would not use it because it took no account of their wish to plan births within their own working hours. She was unwilling to adapt the system to that and broke off the doctorate.

== Career ==
=== Industry ===
For about 25 years De Ketelaere worked on data and analytics for multinational companies. She was employed by Microsoft from 2003 to 2007 and then by SAS Institute until 2019. In 2018, while director of customer intelligence at SAS, she was one of five finalists for the ICT Woman of the Year award of the trade magazine Data News. From SAS she also contributed to the report of AI4Belgium, an expert group that proposed an AI strategy for Belgium in 2019.

=== IMEC ===
De Ketelaere moved to IMEC in May 2019 to lead its AI programmes. In May 2021 she became director of AI strategy at IDLab, IMEC's research group in Ghent and Antwerp, a role she held part-time. At the same time she began coaching start-ups and teaching as an adjunct professor at Vlerick.

=== Vlerick and advisory work ===
Vlerick Business School appointed De Ketelaere adjunct professor in 2021. She teaches sustainable, ethical and trustworthy AI there, including on the Masters in Business Analytics & AI and on the online executive programme Take the Lead in AI. She works as a self-employed strategic AI advisor and keynote speaker, and sits on the boards or advisory boards of several companies. In February 2023 she joined the board of Springbok, a Dutch-Flemish group of digital agencies. Start-ups she has mentored include Polysense and EDGX. In May 2024 she was named IT Person of the Year at the Computable Awards, presented at Cybersec Europe.

=== Public engagement ===
In 2021 the federal Secretary of State for Digitalisation, Mathieu Michel, appointed her to the Digital Minds, a group of 22 people from business and research who advise the Belgian government on digital policy.

De Ketelaere speaks regularly at conferences and public events. On 14 November 2022 she gave the keynote lecture "Demystifying artificial intelligence" at "AI Public Perspectives", a workshop on public perceptions of AI held in the European Parliament by its Panel for the Future of Science and Technology (STOA). At Expo 2025 in Osaka she spoke in the Belgian pavilion in August 2025, during its week on peace, human security and dignity. On 13 May 2026 she took part in a panel on balancing digital rights and sustainability at the first International Meeting on Digital Rights in Barcelona. On 10 October 2026 she spoke in the Flemish Parliament about how chatbots affect personal relationships, at a study day on loneliness and polarisation organised by Peter Van Rompuy.

=== Media ===
De Ketelaere regularly discusses AI, including its sustainability and ethics, on radio and television. In June 2025, on Radio 1, she questioned a claim by the OpenAI chief executive Sam Altman about how little energy a single ChatGPT question uses, pointing to the fast-growing use of AI and to the energy needed to train such systems. She had already written about the energy consumption of AI in general in December 2020, in an opinion piece for De Tijd with her IMEC colleague Axel Nackaerts that called for more energy-efficient AI systems and an energy label for AI. She is also one of the writers of the paper's column De Matrix, on the technology sector. In May 2026 she appeared on the business programme Trends Talk to talk about the mistakes companies make when they adopt AI.

French-language media interview her as well. La Libre Belgique asked her about the Chinese language model DeepSeek in January 2025, and in March that year she was a guest on Les Lundis IA, a programme about AI on the RTBF online channel iXPé, to discuss ethical and responsible AI.

=== Companion chatbots ===
In January 2023 De Ketelaere explained the possible impact of ChatGPT to viewers of the VRT programme Terzake. Soon afterwards she was contacted by the family of a Belgian man who had taken his own life after six weeks of intensive conversations with Eliza, a companion chatbot made by the American company Chai Research. As far as was known, it was the first case of its kind. The family did not want to speak out themselves and asked her to bring it to public attention. Through her, La Libre Belgique got in touch with the family, whose account it published on 28 March 2023. The next day the paper ran an open letter from around fifty academics calling for legal safeguards against manipulative AI. De Ketelaere was one of its five lead authors. In the days that followed, the case was reported internationally.

With three other experts she then set up the Safe AI Companion Collective (SAICC), a pro bono initiative to draw attention to the dangers of companion chatbots. In the summer of 2023 the group filed complaints against Chai Research with the Belgian Data Protection Authority and with the Federal Public Service Economy.

In early 2025 De Ketelaere brought Megan Garcia to Brussels. Garcia's son, the American teenager Sewell Setzer III, had died by suicide in 2024 after a relationship with a Character.ai chatbot. On 24 February 2025 De Ketelaere opened a session on the societal impact of AI companions at the Belgian Federal Public Service for Policy and Support (BOSA), with a talk on their dark side. Garcia then described her lawsuit against a chatbot company. She addressed Belgian policymakers there and the European Commission the day after. De Ketelaere herself has asked the Commission for stricter rules on chatbots and for an official body that affected families can turn to. She wants the companies behind the chatbots to be fully transparent about their systems, but she has not called for a ban.

De Ketelaere went on to study the psychological risks of chatbots by analysing the conversation logs and data files of several users who had become emotionally dependent on them. As reported by De Tijd in February 2026, she examined the files that OpenAI had sent to users after they requested an export of their data. From them she concluded that ChatGPT switches between model versions during a conversation, so that the tone of its answers changes. In the files she also found terms such as "experiment", "test" and "make hidden from user", which she took as a sign that OpenAI runs experiments on its users, and in other files she found that OpenAI classifies users' emotions. She has called for such practices to be made transparent, arguing that they now take place without users' knowledge or consent.

The book The Chatbot Trap grew out of this work. It was first published in Dutch by Borgerhoff & Lamberigts in March 2026 as Loop niet in de val van de chatbot. Drawing on her research and on users' own accounts, it describes how such systems keep users attached and what she believes is needed to limit the harm. French and English editions were announced for May or June that year and were published by Naixis as Le piège invisible des chatbots and The Chatbot Trap.

In September 2026 she explained on Radio 1 how ChatGPT works, in the context of the lawsuit that the Canadian province of British Columbia had brought against OpenAI after a school shooting. On 29 September she described on De wereld van Sofie the techniques that chatbots imitating a dead parent or a former partner use to keep people engaged.

=== Earlier books ===
Her first book, Mens versus machine, came out with Pelckmans in November 2020. It explains the basic ideas of AI to readers without a technical background. A French translation, Homme versus machine, followed in May 2021. Reviewing it for the Humanistisch Verbond, Paul Van Aelst called it an accessible introduction and singled out its case for "AI translators" who get engineers talking to lawyers and managers. Pelckmans also published a German edition and an English one, Wanted: Human-AI Translators.

With Saskia Martens she wrote the children's book Yoko en de magische ster (April 2024), which draws on her own experience of working in large companies. The authors used AI for some of the text and illustrations as an experiment.

== Recognition ==
- 2018: finalist, ICT Woman of the Year (Data News)
- 2020: Inspiring Fifty Belgium
- 2022: runner-up, IT Person of the Year (Computable Awards)
- 2023: runner-up, IT Person of the Year (Computable Awards)
- 2024: IT Person of the Year (Computable Awards)
- 2025: Gouden Koffiekopje from the Dutch marketing magazine Adformatie, awarded in January 2025 for the prediction about AI's impact on the marketing sector that she had made as a speaker at its Koffiedik Kijken event a year earlier
- 2025: finalist, Technology category, ELLE Women of the Year (ELLE Belgium)
- 2026: one of five nominees, Legacy category, AI4Her Awards 2027 (AI4ALL)
- 2026: AIKUL Alumni Award, KU Leuven

== Publications ==
- De Ketelaere, Geertrui Mieke (2020). Mens versus machine. Artificiële intelligentie ontrafeld (in Dutch). Pelckmans. ISBN 9789463370912.
- De Ketelaere, Geertrui Mieke (2021). Homme versus machine. L'intelligence artificielle démystifiée (in French). Pelckmans. ISBN 9789464013276.
- De Ketelaere, Geertrui Mieke (2021). Wanted: Human-AI Translators. Pelckmans. ISBN 9789464013269.
- De Ketelaere, Geertrui Mieke (2021). Mensch oder Maschine (in German). Pelckmans. ISBN 9789464017489.
- De Ketelaere, Geertrui Mieke; Martens, Saskia (2024). Yoko en de magische ster (in Dutch). Pelckmans. ISBN 9789463104906.
- De Ketelaere, Geertrui Mieke (2026). Loop niet in de val van de chatbot (in Dutch). Borgerhoff & Lamberigts. ISBN 9789493491090.
- De Ketelaere, Geertrui Mieke (2026). Le piège invisible des chatbots (in French). Naixis. ISBN 9782960416701.
- De Ketelaere, Geertrui Mieke (2026). The Chatbot Trap. Naixis. ISBN 9782960416725.
