= VRT NWS Journaal =

Belgian television news programme

- Genre: News programme
- Country of origin: Belgium
- Original language: Dutch

Production
- Producer: VRT
- Production location: Brussels
- Camera setup: Multi-camera
- Running time: 5 - 40 minutes

Original release
- Network: VRT (VRT 1, VRT Canvas)
- Release: 31 October 1953 – present

VRT NWS Journaal (formerly Het Journaal) is the main news program of VRT NWS, broadcast daily on the channels VRT 1 and VRT Canvas.

The first edition of Het Journaal was broadcast on 31 October 1953, the day that Flemish television began. Initially, Het Journaal was a small operation, with few staff; nowadays, there are dozens of journalists, and many other employees, such as directors, producers and technicians.

== Broadcasts ==
VRT NWS Journaal is typically broadcast four times a day on VRT 1: 1pm, 6pm, 7pm, and the late news, which usually airs at around 10:45pm. At weekends, an extra bulletin is broadcast at 8pm on VRT Canvas: this airs in place of current affairs programme Terzake (roughly translated, 'In this respect'). The 7pm edition is the main edition, and the most-watched, usually running for 40 minutes.

== Presenters ==
Current news presenters are:

- Wim De Vilder (since 1999)
- Annelies Van Herck (since 2004)
- Goedele Wachters (since 2007)
- Hanne Decoutere (since 2012)
- Fatma Taspinar (since 2018)
- Aurélie Boffé (since 2024)
- Riadh Bahri (since 2022)

Notable Former news presenters:

- Martine Tanghe (1978–2020)
- Jan Becaus (1985–2013)
- Ivo Belet (1989–2003)
- Geert van Istendael(1978–1993)
- Dirk Sterckx(1986–1998)
- André Vermeulen(1985–1996)
