= Nieuws+ =

Nieuws+ logo

Nieuws Plus (Nieuws+) (English: News+) is the digital radio news station run by VRT. It is a current affairs channel, listen to a digital radio receiver (DAB) or via the internet. Nieuws+ broadcasts via DAB the latest news from Radio 1 in a loop. When listening to a digital radio device, the screen of the DAB appliance displays the titles of the news again soon. Also "breaking news" is broadcast directly on Nieuws+.
