= De Ketelaere =

De Ketelaere is a Belgian Flemish surname. Notable people with the surname include:

- Charles De Ketelaere (born 2001), Belgian footballer
- Geertrui Mieke De Ketelaere (born 1970), Belgian civil engineer, promoter of ethical AI
- Kurt Deketelaere (born 1966), Belgian academic

== See also ==
- Ketelaar
