= Patrick Tonnard =

Belgian plastic surgeon

- Education: Ghent University (MD, 1987); Vrije Universiteit Brussel (PhD, 2015)
- Known for: MACS-lift; Nanofat grafting
- Scientific career
- Fields: Plastic surgery
- Workplaces: AZ Sint-Lucas Hospital, Ghent; Coupure Centre for Plastic Surgery; Esthetic Medical Center II

Patrick Tonnard is a Belgian plastic surgeon practicing in the city of Ghent. In cooperation with Alexis Verpaele, he developed the Minimal Access Cranial Suspension (MACS) facelift, published in Plastic and Reconstructive Surgery in 2002. Later authors have referred to the procedure as the "Tonnard and Verpaele technique." The same journal published his team's description of nanofat grafting in 2013, a paper later cited as the introduction of the technique by systematic reviews in Plastic and Reconstructive Surgery and the Journal of Clinical Medicine.

== Career ==
Tonnard graduated cum laude in medicine from Ghent University in 1987 and went on to train in general and plastic surgery in Ghent and Bordeaux. He has been a consultant plastic surgeon at AZ Sint-Lucas Hospital in Ghent since 1994. In 1997, he opened a private Coupure Centre for Plastic Surgery, where Alexis Verpaele joined him in 1999. In 2007, they opened a second clinic in Sint-Martens-Latem called the Esthetic Medical Center II (referred to as E:MC2). Tonnard defended his PhD at the Vrije Universiteit Brussel Faculty of Medicine and Pharmacy in 2015, with a thesis on the role of fat grafting in facial rejuvenation.

== Surgical techniques ==
The MACS-lift is a short-scar rhytidectomy carried out through an inverted L-shaped pre-auricular incision. Two permanent purse-string sutures anchored in the deep temporal fascia pull the sagging soft tissues of the face vertically upwards, and the operation can be done under local anaesthesia. The 2009 review by Philippe Kestemont in the Annales de Chirurgie Plastique Esthétique analysed an extended variant called the X-MACS, used for the mid-face area.

In nanofat grafting, adipose tissue harvested by liposuction is mechanically emulsified by being passed back and forth between two syringes through a narrow connector and then filtered. The process destroys viable adipocytes but preserves the stromal vascular fraction, so the resulting fluid, rich in adipose-derived stem cells, can be injected into the dermis through a fine needle. Independent reviews in the plastic-surgery literature treat the procedure as one of the mechanical methods for isolating the stromal vascular fraction for clinical use. A 2024 systematic review in Plastic and Reconstructive Surgery assessed twelve clinical studies on the procedure and reported improvements in scar treatment and skin quality, while warning that most of the included studies were of low level of evidence. A 2023 review in the Journal of Clinical Medicine surveyed later variants and dated the introduction of the method to the 2023 paper authored by Tonnard.

== Books ==
Tonnard has co-authored four English-language scientific books on facial plastic surgery: The MACS-lift: Short-Scar Rhytidectomy (Quality Medical Publishing, 2004), Short-Scar Face Lift: Operative Strategies and Techniques (Quality Medical Publishing, 2007), Centrofacial Rejuvenation (Thieme, 2017), and Regenerative Facial Surgery (Quality Medical Publishing, 2022). He has also written two Dutch-language books for a general audience: Schone Schijn with the journalist Laurens De Keyser (Van Halewyck, 2000) and Verliefd op het tweede gezicht with Verpaele (Houtekiet, 2009).

In September 2018, the Belgian public broadcaster VRT NWS reported that Centrofacial Rejuvenation, which presents the work on nanofat grafting, had received a British Medical Association Medical Book Award.

== Humanitarian work ==
In 2006, Tonnard and Verpaele co-founded See & Smile, a Flemish non-profit that brings over plastic surgeons and ophthalmologists for surgical missions in Myanmar, Cambodia and Indonesia. The plastic surgeons are designated to treat cleft lip and cleft palate, while the partner ophthalmologists perform cataract surgery.
