= Ketelaar =

Ketelaar or Ketelaars is a Dutch surname. Notable people with the surname include:

- Digna Ketelaar (born 1967), Dutch tennis player
- Hanneke Ketelaars (born 1974), Dutch tennis player
- James Edward Ketelaar (born 1957), American scholar and historian
- Jan Ketelaar (1908–2001), Dutch chemist and author
- Leo Ketelaars (1913–1992), Dutch violinist, operatic baritone, opera manager and academic voice teacher
- Sander van Doorn (real name Sander Ketelaars; born 1979), Dutch DJ and record producer

== See also ==
- De Ketelaere
