= Radio Advertising Bureau =

Radio Advertising Bureau may refer to:

- Radio Advertising Bureau (UK)
- Radio Advertising Bureau (US)
