= Tom De Cock =

Flemish DJ, TV host, and writer

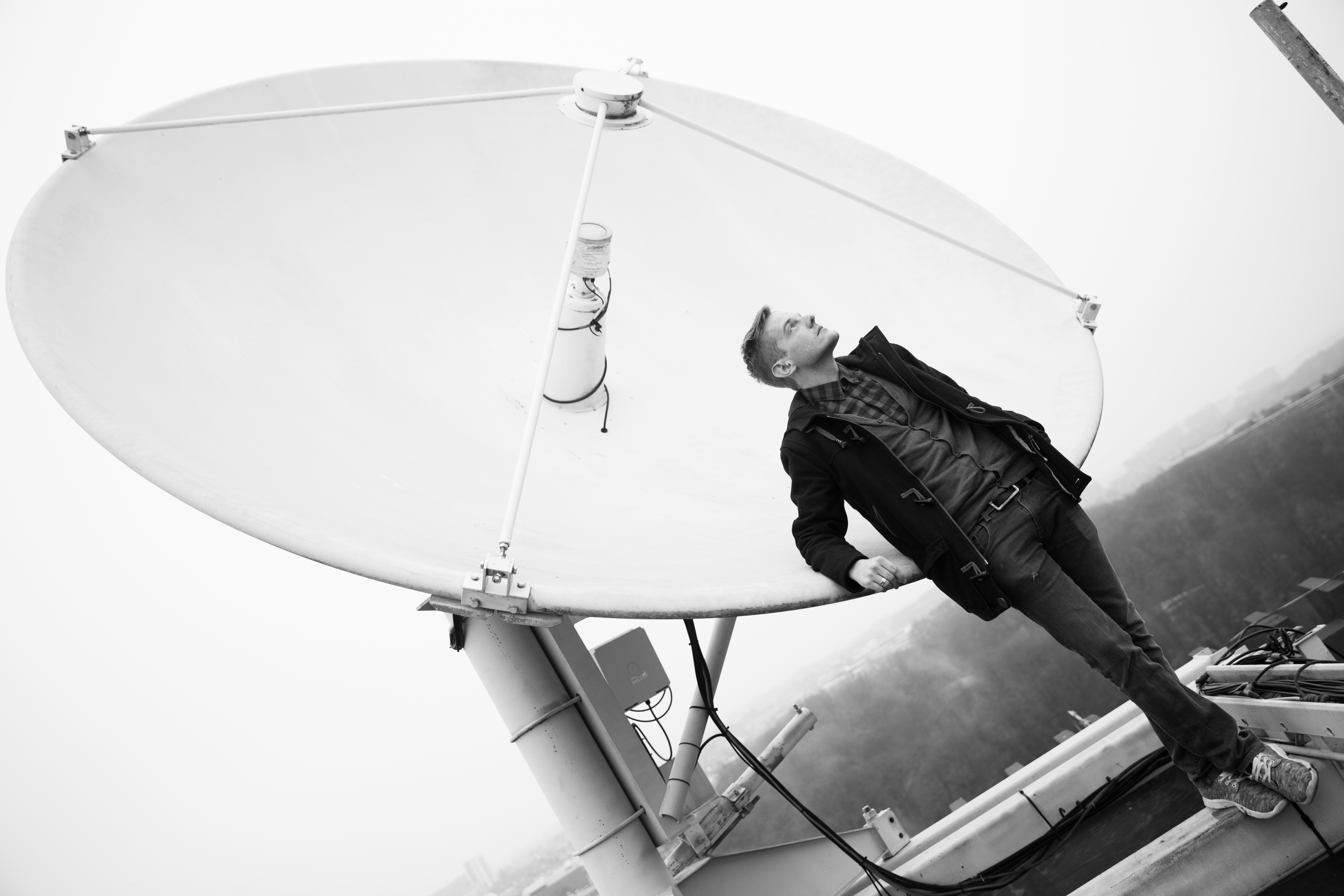
- Tom De Cock on the rooftop of the national television building, 2015
- Born: Tom Anne-Marie Bob De Cock; 23 September 1983 (age 41); Schoten, Belgium
- Occupation(s): Radio DJ, TV host, author
- Years active: 2004–present
- Website: http://www.tomdecock.com/

Tom De Cock (born 23 September 1983) is a Flemish radio DJ, television host and writer. At the age of 16 he published his first novel "De Openbaring" ("The Revelation").

== Radio ==
In 2008, he started as a radio DJ at the public radio station Donna, where he covered the Saturday afternoon slot from 3 to 8 pm. One year later, the station was shut down and replaced by MNM, where De Cock had a late night talkshow called De Cock Late Night, and a weekend programma named "Weekend De Cock". Since September 2012 De Cock has his own evening drivetime show "Planeet De Cock" ("Planet De Cock") from 4 to 7 pm on workdays.

On MNM, Tom De Cock is also the face of a yearly contest for highschools, "De Strafste School". With his colleague Peter Van de Veire he co-hosted "Marathonradio" - a project in which both DJs made back-to-back 24h live broadcasts for 17 days in a row, to support students during their final exams - in 2013 and 2014.

== Television ==
Tom De Cock began his television career behind the scenes, mainly as a pre-show audience warm-up artist, for live shows such as Steracteur Sterartiest, Peter Live, Eurosong and Zo is er maar één. When available, he is still active in that business.

De Cock can be heard regularly as the voice of a variety of TV programmes. In 2015 he became the resident voice of the daily show "Iedereen Beroemd" ("Everybody Famous") on Eén.

For the youth channel OP12, De Cock made a series about how teenagers experienced local elections in 2012. The series ended in a live show on the public TV station Eén, in which he reflected on the influence local policy has on teenage citizens.

Together with journalist André Vermeulen, De Cock provided the offscreen commentary for the Eurovision Song Contest in 2013 on Eén. In 2010, 2011 and 2012 he did the same for the Junior Eurovision Song Contest.

== Personal life ==
Tom De Cock's parents own a bakery in Antwerp. He was born in Schoten but grew up in Rotselaar near Leuven, where he studied Latin and Modern Languages at the Montfortcollege Rotselaar. After that he obtained a master's degree in Germanic Philology (Dutch and English) at the Catholic University of Leuven.

On 6 August 2010 Tom De Cock married his husband Maarten. Today, they live in Leuven.

De Cock caused quite a commotion on 12 September 2011 when he declared that the prohibition of blood donation by homosexual men was "foolish and homophobic".

Since 2014, De Cock is an ambassador for the LGBT youth organisation Wel Jong Niet Hetero.

In 2014, De Cock and his husband adopted a baby girl named Jasmijn.

== Bibliography ==
- De Cock, Tom (2001) De Openbaring, een profetie, Houtekiet, Antwerpen, ISBN 9052405980
- De Cock, Tom (2016) En Toen Kwam Jij, De Bezige Bij, ISBN 9789023497486
- De Cock, Tom (2021) Lily, Pelckmans, EAN 9789463832717
- De Cock, Tom (2022) Lily: Storm, Pelckmans, EAN 9789464015645
- De Cock, Tom (2024) Lily: Staal, Pelckmans, EAN 9789463374866
