= Jan Becaus =

Flemish politician and former journalist

Jean-Marie "Jan" Becaus (born 18 July 1948 in Ghent) is a Flemish politician and former journalist. He is best known for having been a reporter and news anchor for the Flemish public broadcaster VRT, a job he held for 28 years. In 2014 he became a co-opted senator for the New Flemish Alliance.

== Early life and education ==
Becaus grew up in Muide, the port district of Ghent, where his family ran a butchers' shop; he moved with his family to Heusden in 1963. In 1971 Becaus qualified as a language teacher, a job he held until 1984.

== Career ==
Becaus became a journalist at the VRT (then known as the BRT) in 1984; a year later, in 1985, he became a regular anchor of the news programme Het Journaal. For many years, Becaus presented the late night news; however, in 2012 he moved to the afternoon and evening bulletins, due to a change in format of the late news. In addition to presenting the news, Becaus was also the VRT's royal correspondent, reporting on the Belgian monarchy; in this capacity he made a documentary about Queen Paola, whom he also briefly taught Dutch. He also regularly appeared as a reporter and commentator on stories relating to the Catholic Church. Becaus presented his final broadcast on 31 July 2013, bringing to an end a career of almost thirty years as a journalist.

Within Flanders, Becaus is well known for his correct pronunciation of foreign languages, especially English; for this reason, he became very popular on social media in his final years as a news presenter.

In 2014, Becaus was co-opted as a senator for the New Flemish Alliance. Some press commentators have referred to him as a "white rabbit" (wit konijn).

== Personal life ==
Becaus is married, has no children and lives in Sint-Martens-Latem, near Ghent.
