= United Kingdom Independent Broadcasting =

UK TV broadcaster affiliation organization

- Predecessor: Independent Television Companies Association (ITCA)
- Formation: 1981; 45 years ago
- Type: Affiliation of broadcasters
- Members: ITV, Channel 4, S4C
- Official language: English, Welsh

United Kingdom Independent Broadcasting (UKIB) is an affiliation of three British independent television production companies and broadcasters. The primary function of its predecessor, the Independent Television Companies Association (ITCA), was to represent independent British television interests as a member of the European Broadcasting Union (EBU). The current members of UKIB are the ITV Network Centre, the four ITV licence holders, Channel 4, and S4C.

== History ==
UKIB was formed in 1981, when the Association of Independent Radio Contractors (AIRC) was admitted as an active member of the European Broadcasting Union (EBU). It replaced the Independent Broadcasting Authority (IBA), formerly the Independent Television Authority (ITA) as the second British EBU member.

Once ITCA was admitted as a fully active EBU member, the AIRC joined with UKIB to form the Commercial Radio Companies Association (CRCA) in June 1996. In July 2006, it merged with the Radio Advertising Bureau to form Radiocentre, the industry body for UK commercial radio. Following the merger, CRCA cancelled its EBU membership.

The IBA continued to exist until it was disbanded by the Broadcasting Act 1990, which replaced it with the Independent Television Commission (ITC) and the Radio Authority.

== Members ==
Service name	Broadcast area	Licence holder	Broadcast since (Note: First broadcast in that region and not since the first franchises were held)	Parent company	EBU abbreviation
ITV Network
ITV1; STV; UTV	United Kingdom, Channel Islands, and Isle of Man	ITV Network Limited	1955	ITV plc STV Group plc	UKIB/ITV
ITV (Channel 3) companies
ITV Anglia	East of England	ITV Broadcasting Limited	1959	ITV plc	UKIB/ITV/ANG
ITV Border	England–Scotland border	ITV Broadcasting Limited	1961	ITV plc	UKIB/ITV/BTV
ITV Central	Midlands (Note: Up to 1968, the service for the Midlands region was provided by ATV from Monday to Friday and by ABC Weekend TV at weekends.)	ITV Broadcasting Limited	1956	ITV plc	UKIB/ITV/CEN
ITV Channel Television	Channel Islands	ITV Broadcasting Limited	1962	ITV plc	UKIB/ITV/CHA
ITV Granada	North West England (Note: Up to 1968, the service for a single Northern area consisting of both the current North West region and most of the current Yorkshire region was provided by Granada Television from Monday to Friday and by ABC Weekend TV at weekends.) and Isle of Man (Note: Coverage was transferred from ITV Border and Tyne Tees to ITV Granada following digital switch-over in the Isle of Man in July 2009.)	ITV Broadcasting Limited	1956	ITV plc	UKIB/ITV/GRA
ITV London (Carlton)	London Weekday	ITV Broadcasting Limited	1955	ITV plc	UKIB/ITV/LDN
ITV London (LWT)	London Weekend	ITV Broadcasting Limited	1955	ITV plc	UKIB/ITV/LDN
ITV Meridian	South and South East England	ITV Broadcasting Limited	1958	ITV plc	UKIB/ITV/MER
ITV Tyne Tees	North East England	ITV Broadcasting Limited	1959	ITV plc	UKIB/ITV/TTT
ITV Wales	Wales	ITV Broadcasting Limited	1958	ITV plc	UKIB/ITV/WALES
ITV West	West of England	ITV Broadcasting Limited	1958	ITV plc	UKIB/ITV/WEST
ITV West Country	South West England	ITV Broadcasting Limited	1961	ITV plc	UKIB/ITV/WES
ITV Yorkshire	Yorkshire, Lincolnshire, and North Norfolk	ITV Broadcasting Limited	1956	ITV plc	UKIB/ITV/YTV
STV Central	Central Scotland	STV Central Limited	1957	STV Group plc	UKIB/STV
STV North	North of Scotland	STV North Limited	1961	STV Group plc	UKIB/STVN
UTV	Northern Ireland	UTV Limited	1959	ITV plc	UKIB/ITV/UTV
Channel 4
Channel 4	England, Scotland, Wales, and Northern Ireland (Note: Now available in Wales but is designated for the rest of the United Kingdom)	Channel 4	1982	Channel Four Television Corporation	UKIB/C4
S4C
S4C	Wales	Sianel 4 Cymru/Channel 4 Wales	1982	S4C Authority	UKIB/S4C

=== Digital channels ===
Besides the main ITV, Channel 4, and S4C channels, there are several digital-only channels: ITV2, ITV3, ITV4 and ITV Quiz, owned by ITV plc, and E4, E4 Extra, More4, Film4 and 4seven operated by Channel 4.

== Eurovision Song Contest ==
The United Kingdom's entries in the Eurovision Song Contest have been entered by the BBC each time. However, the United Kingdom's Junior Eurovision Song Contest entries were broadcast and selected by ITV from 2003 to 2005, before ITV withdrew in 2006 due to low viewing figures. ITV were also set to host the 2004 contest in Manchester, but pulled out of hosting due to financial and scheduling issues, as well as the previous years poor viewing figures. The contest was eventually held in Lillehammer, Norway.

S4C announced on 9 May 2018 that Wales would debut at the Junior Eurovision Song Contest 2018 held in Minsk, Belarus. However, S4C withdrew from the contest in 2020, citing the COVID-19 pandemic as the reason for their withdrawal, and have not returned since. On 25 August 2022, it was confirmed that the United Kingdom would return to the contest in 2022 in Yerevan, Armenia, with the BBC replacing ITV as the country's broadcaster.
