= MNM Hits =

Radio station

MNM Hits is one of the radio stations of the VRT that can be heard via digital radio and the internet.

It airs the greatest hits from the past and present, without advertising or presenters. MNM Hits with VAT: A New Era for Music Broadcasting Every hour there is the news from the mother station MNM. MNM Hits can be heard via DAB, internet streaming or digital television.

First the station was called Donna Hitbits. But because mother station Donna on January 5, 2009 made place for the new radio station MNM, Donna hitbits was replaced by MNM hits.
