= Klara continuo =

Flemish digital radio station

Klara continuo logo

Klara Continuo (stylized as Klara continuo) is a Flemish digital radio station that broadcasts classical music alongside the traditional channel Klara. Both are public stations mainly financed by the Flemish government. It is available as a digital radio stream from Vlaamse Radio- en Televisieomroeporganisatie (VRT).

== History ==
Klara Continuo was launched on Sunday, February 29, 2004, as the successor to the mainly experimental channel DAB Classic, then the first digital radio network of the VRT. Until mid-2006, Klara Continuo broadcast from 7 am to midnight, and from midnight to 7 am Klara Continuo broadcast Klara programming. Later, Klara Continuo began broadcasting 24/7, while Klara broadcast Klara Continuo's programming from midnight until 7 am.

The station can be accessed via the digital television package of VRT or over the internet. Frank Deleu is responsible for station management.

== Programming ==
Software composes the playlists based on Klara's music database. Each piece has multiple parameters, and the filters assess these parameters to make playlists. No two pieces of the same genre play in succession (e.g., no two pieces of piano or guitar music). At least one hour separates works by the same composer, no vocal works are placed after each other, and "difficult" tracks are not programmed.

== Funding ==
Klara Continuo is a public network and does not conduct commercial activities. Other radio stations of the VRT network may earn income from commercial activities, such as running commercials. Klara Continuo requires little funding, because only one staffer is required. The rest of the budget goes to paying license fees for the programming software. Costs that are not allocated to Klara Continuo, such as broadcasting rights, depreciation expenses, and operating costs are covered by VRT.
