= Radioplayer =

Radio technology platform

- Radioplayer logo
- Formation: 28 July 2010; 16 years ago
- Purpose: A simple and accessible way to listen to radio via connected devices
- Headquarters: 15 Alfred Place, London, WC1E 7EB
- CEO: Yann Legarson
- Staff: 15
- Website: www.radioplayer.org

Radioplayer is a radio technology platform, owned by UK radio broadcasters and operated under licence in some other countries. It operates an internet radio web tuner, a set of mobile phone apps, an in-car adaptor, and a growing range of integrations with other connected devices and platforms.

Radioplayer is operated by UK Radioplayer Ltd which is a not-for-profit organisation owned by UK radio broadcasters. Initial shareholders were the BBC, Global Radio, GMG Radio, Absolute Radio and RadioCentre. After consolidation in the radio market, current shareholders are the BBC, Global Radio, Bauer Media Group and RadioCentre.

== History ==
Launched in the UK on 31 March 2011, Radioplayer set out to offer a simple and accessible way to listen to radio via the internet. It contained 157 stations at launch.

Initially working internally at the BBC for Tim Davie, then Director of BBC Audio & Music, Michael Hill led the project since March 2009; he was made Managing Director of UK Radioplayer Ltd on 28 July 2010.

At launch, Radioplayer was a simple and straightforward Flash-based radio player, linked-to by radio stations on their own website. The player included searching and bookmarking across all of UK radio station content.

On 5 October 2012, Radioplayer launched a mobile app on iOS phones with an Android version following shortly afterwards. The apps are unavailable for download outside the United Kingdom. This was followed by a tablet app on 25 September 2013.

The apps also support Android Wear, Android Auto, Smart Device Link, Apple Watch and Apple CarPlay. They are also compatible with Chromecast and AirPlay.

In September 2016, Radioplayer announced it had been chosen by Amazon to integrate with their new voice-controlled 'Echo' device, ahead of its UK launch. In July 2017, Radioplayer integrated with the Sonos and Bose multi-room speaker platforms.

UK Radioplayer currently contains around 500 UK stations, from Ofcom-licensed broadcasters. Online-only 'sister-stations' can also be added, but only by broadcasters with Ofcom licences which have been on the platform for over a year.

== Radioplayer Car ==
Radioplayer Car was announced in September 2014 as a hybrid radio receiver that switches between FM, DAB and streaming to find the strongest signal. Speaking in Oslo in June 2015, Michael Hill said that he hoped to launch the product in the UK and Norway during the summer of 2015.

In February 2017, Radioplayer Car was launched. It was marketed as the world’s first voice-controlled hybrid radio adaptor for car stereos.

A small box, fitted behind the dashboard, links to the auxiliary input on an existing car radio. It connects wirelessly via Bluetooth to the driver’s smartphone by an app. The adaptor enabled drivers to listen to their own smartphone music collections using Bluetooth, take hands-free calls, listen to inbound text messages and receive instant audio travel news, customised by GPS to their location and direction of travel.

The hardware was manufactured under licence by car audio interfaces supplier Connects2, and Hyde Park Corner was promoted as the preferred installer of the audio equipment.

There were several spin-off benefits of the Radioplayer Car project, including the creation of the hybrid radio metadata API for cars, known as the 'WRAPI' (Worldwide Radioplayer API).

== International ==
Through a separate company called Radioplayer Worldwide, Radioplayer technology is licensed to a number of different territories.

Country	Local brand	Launch	Website
Austria	Radioplayer (in German)	Summer 2015	radioplayer.at
Belgium	Radioplayer (in French) (Note: Originally marketed as maRadio)	28 April 2014	radioplayer.be
Belgium	Radioplayer (in Dutch)	24 July 2019	radioplayer.be
Canada	Radioplayer Canada	1 March 2017	radioplayer.ca
Denmark	mereRadio	20 September 2019	mereradio.dk
France	Radioplayer France	9 April 2021	radioplayer.fr
Germany	Radioplayer	Unknown	radioplayer.de
Ireland	Irish Radioplayer	April 2015	radioplayer.ie
Italy	Radioplayer Italia	May 2020	radioplayeritalia.it
Norway	Radioplayernorge.no (Note: Originally marketed as radio.no)	2013	radioplayernorge.no
Portugal	Radioplayer Portugal	13 February 2026	radioplayer.pt
Spain	Radioplayer España	29 October 2019	radioplayerespana.es
Switzerland	Swissradioplayer	30 August 2018	swissradioplayer.ch
Netherlands	Radioplayer	2021	radioplayer.nl
Sweden	Radioplayer	2021	
Slovenia	Radioplayer Slovenia	14 December 2023	
Ukraine	Ukrainian radio	16.11.1925	https://radioplayer.ua/
