= OP12 =

Former Flemish television channel

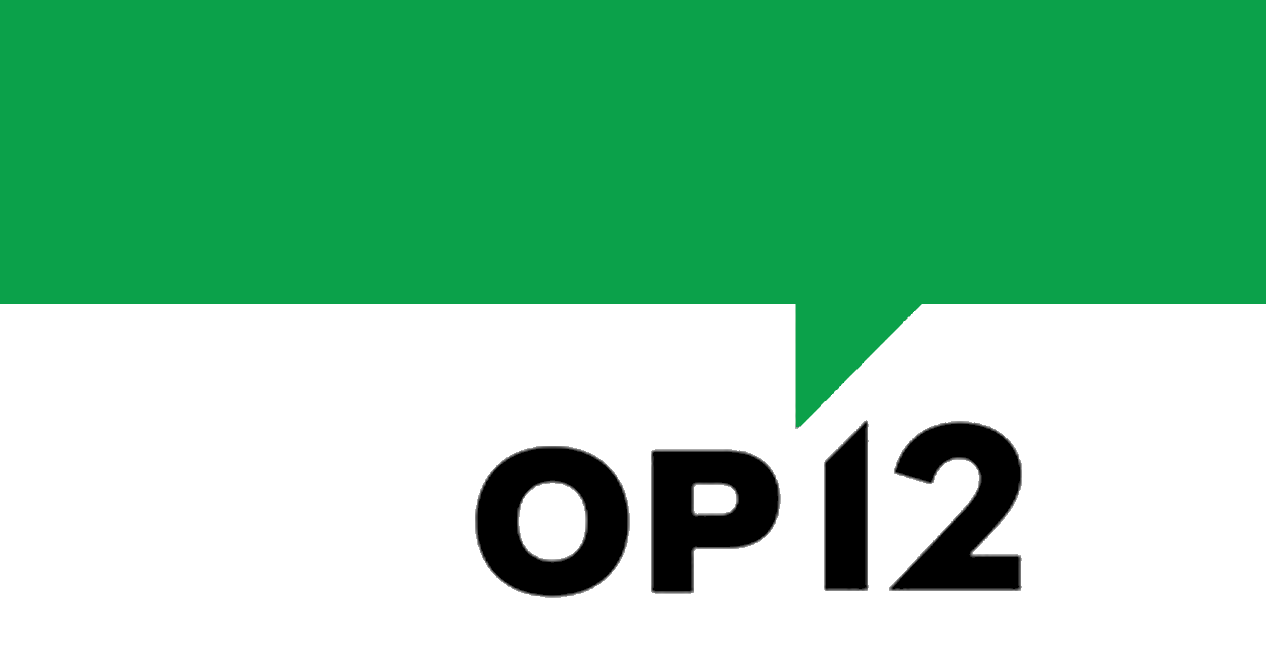
- Country: Belgium (Flanders and Brussels regions)
- Broadcast area: National, also distributed in: Luxembourg; Netherlands

Programming
- Picture format: 576i (16:9 SDTV)

Ownership
- Owner: VRT
- Sister channels: Eén; Canvas; Ketnet; Sporza; BVN

History
- Launched: 14 May 2012; 14 years ago
- Closed: 31 December 2014; 11 years ago

Links
- Website: op12.be

Availability (channel space shared with Ketnet)

Terrestrial
- VRT DVB-T (FTA): Channel 12

OP12 (English: On 12) was the third channel of Belgium's VRT that featured evening broadcasts. The channel was launched on 14 May 2012 and closed on 31 December 2014. The channel's name was derived from the digital channel number that the station was assigned on most digital television platforms.

== History ==
In December 1997, the VRT's second channel was split into two distinct channels: Canvas, aimed at an intellectual audience, and Ketnet, a children's channel. Both channels were broadcast on the same frequency. Ketnet typically ran from 6 am until 8 pm, with Canvas broadcasting from 8 pm until the early hours of the morning. This setup remained in place until early 2012 when the VRT decided to extend the broadcasting hours of Canvas, to broadcast more documentaries, archival content, current affairs, and political coverage; as a result, on 1 May 2012, Canvas and Ketnet were split, with Ketnet moving to channel twelve on most television platforms.

On 14 May 2012, OP12 began evening broadcasts: these were primarily aimed at young people and expatriates living in Flanders, with cultural events and sport also being broadcast.

The aim of the third channel was also to further strengthen the public mission of the VRT. In its first year of broadcasting, the channel primarily broadcast sport and programmes aimed at young people; in the autumn of 2013 following a more comprehensive range of programming, albeit consisting largely of repeats. The OP12 name was often used in combination with some of the famous brands of the VRT; for example, concerts would often be broadcast under the name "Studio Brussel op 12" (Studio Brussel on 12), and live sports broadcasts under the name "Sporza op 12" (Sporza on 12).

Due to financial cutbacks, the VRT announced that evening broadcasts on OP12 would cease on 31 December 2014. The channel remains in use for overspill; for example, during major sporting events, and when extra programming from Eén and Canvas is broadcast, under the respective titles Een+ and Canvas+.

== Programmes ==
- Carte Blanche
- Fans of Flanders
- The New Generation
- De nieuwe lichting
- My Mad Fat Diary
- An Idiot Abroad - The Seven Wonders
- The Fades
- Wolven with audio description
- Buiten de zone
- dasbloghaus.tv
- De Ridder with audio description
- In Vlaamse velden with audio description
- Magazinski
- Push-it
- True Blood
- World of Jenks
- Stille Waters with audio description
- Witse with audio description

== Logos ==
OP12 logo (2012–2014)

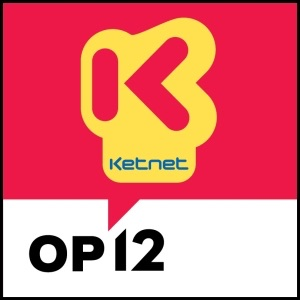
Ketnet op 12 logo

== See also ==
- VRT
- Eén
- Canvas
- Ketnet
- Sporza
- List of television channels in Belgium
