= Radiocentre =

UK trade association for commercial radio

- Predecessor: Commercial Radio Companies Association (CRCA)
- Formation: 1 July 2006; 20 years ago
- Merger of: CRCA and Radio Advertising Bureau
- Purpose: Representing interests of UK commercial radio
- Headquarters: 15 Alfred Place, London
- CEO: Matt Payton
- Staff: 20
- Website: www.radiocentre.org

Radiocentre is the industry body for commercial radio in the UK. It encompasses several different kinds of broadcaster-owned and operated audio, including podcasts and on-demand streaming services.

Radiocentre has three main services: advertising, policy/lobbying and clearance. Radiocentre helps radio stations comply with the necessary content rules and standards laid out in the BCAP Code of Broadcast Advertising and the Ofcom Broadcasting Code.

== Background ==
Radiocentre was formed in 2006 when the Commercial Radio Companies Association (CRCA) merged with the Radio Advertising Bureau (RAB). The RACC (Radio Advertising Clearance Centre) then became Radiocentre Clearance in 2015 as part of a wider rebrand.

The Commercial Radio Companies Association (CRCA) was founded by the first radio companies under the name Association of Independent Radio Companies when independent radio began with LBC and Capital in 1973. It became the CRCA in 1996.

The RAB was founded in 1992. It was the marketing body for radio, funded entirely by the UK commercial radio industry.

Radiocentre's chief executive Matt Payton was appointed in July 2022. It is the joint owner of the national radio ratings analyst Radio Joint Audience Research Ltd and online audio player Radioplayer alongside the BBC.

== Services ==
Radiocentre offers three types of services: policy, advertising (formerly the Radio Advertising Bureau [RAB]), and clearance (formerly the Radio Advertising Clearance Centre).

=== Policy/Lobbying ===
Radiocentre represents the UK commercial radio industry directly with government, parliament, regulators and other industry bodies. It works closely with Ofcom and the Department for Culture, Media and Sport on issues including media regulation and the role and remit of the BBC.

They have lobbied for the inclusion of Part 6 of the Media Act 2024 which introduced powers to ensure radio remains freely available and accessible on voice activated platforms like smart speakers.

Radiocentre also publishes researchk. This includes Commercial Radio: A force for good and Beyond the Bubble.

=== Advertising ===
Radiocentre advertises on behalf of the commercial radio industry. In Kay 2016, Radiocentre launched a new advertising campaign called "See Radio Differently". The campaign won a Bronze at the Cannes Lions International Festival of Creativity.

=== Clearance ===
Radiocentre Clearance is the UK commercial radio industry's advertising clearance body and is responsible for clearing up to 25,000 ads per year against the UK Code of Broadcast Advertising (BCAP Code) as developed by the UK Advertising Standards Authority (ASA) and the Ofcom Broadcasting Code. These regulatory codes, plus nearly 60 Acts of UK Parliament, determine what can and cannot be said in all UK radio advertisements. All stations contribute to the cost via their broadcasting licence fees.

== Members ==
Radiocentre member stations together represent approximately 90% of commercial radio listening. Any commercial radio station in the UK holding a terrestrial radio broadcasting licence from Ofcom is eligible to become a station member of the Radiocentre. Major member groups are Global Radio and Bauer Media, while regional groups include Nation Broadcasting and DC Thomson.

== Initiatives ==
=== Diversity Masterclasses ===
Radiocentre works closely with Creative Access to try and improve the representation of young people from BAME backgrounds and those with a lower socioeconomic status, hosting radio masterclasses for Creative Access interns who are looking to start careers in radio and audio.

=== AER ===
The Association of European Radios (AER) is the Europe-wide trade body for commercial radio, representing the interests of over 5,000 commercial radio stations to the EU Institutions. AER promotes the development of European commercially funded radio broadcasting, by ensuring a fair and sustainable economic framework for radio to thrive in. Radiocentre is a member of the AER.

=== Mental Health Minute ===
From 2018 to 2022, the Mental Health Minute was a unique, one-minute message during Mental Health Awareness Week on the importance of talking about mental health issues, reaching out for support or to check in on someone who may be suffering, and listening to each other.
