= The Deal with Iran =

2026 Belgian documentary series

- Genre: Documentary
- Written by: Maarten Stuyck
- Directed by: Lennart Stuyck; Maarten Stuyck
- Country of origin: Belgium
- Original language: Dutch
- No. of episodes: 3

Production
- Running time: 52 minutes
- Production company: Diplodokus

Original release
- Network: VRT Canvas
- Release: 2026

The Deal with Iran is a Belgian documentary television series in three parts, directed by Lennart Stuyck and Maarten Stuyck and broadcast by VRT Canvas. It won the award for best docuseries at Canneseries in 2026.

== Content ==
The series examines a 2018 plot to bomb a gathering of the Iranian opposition near Paris, and the investigation that followed, which led to an Iranian diplomat operating in Europe. It deals with covert intelligence networks, political pressure on the prosecution, and the use of detained foreign nationals as diplomatic leverage.

== Production ==
The series was written by Maarten Stuyck and directed by him with Lennart Stuyck. It was produced by the Belgian documentary company Diplodokus for VRT Canvas, and made available in Belgium on VRT MAX.

== Awards ==
The Deal with Iran competed in the docuseries competition at Canneseries in April 2026 and won the prize for best docuseries. The jury was chaired by the Spanish filmmaker Isabel Coixet, with the actors Simon Astier and Vincent Elbaz among its members.
