= James Edward Ketelaar =

American historian

James E. Ketelaar
- Born: November 10, 1957 (age 68); Camp Lejeune, North Carolina

Education
- Education: Kalamazoo College (BS); University of Chicago (MA); University of Chicago (PhD)

Philosophical work
- Institutions: University of North Florida; Stanford University; University of Chicago
- Notable works: Of Heretics and Martyrs in Meiji Japan: Buddhism and its Persecution
- Notable ideas: Buddhist martyrdom

James E. Ketelaar (born November 10, 1957) is an American scholar and historian specializing in the religious, philosophical, and intellectual history of Japan. He is professor emeritus in the Department of History, the Department of East Asian Languages and Civilizations, and the Divinity School at the University of Chicago, where he has been teaching since 1996.

He is particularly known for his academic contributions to Buddhist martyrdom in Meiji-era Japan, having been described as bringing about the "coming of age" in the study of Japan's modern religious history.

== Education ==
Ketelaar received a B.A. in 1978 from Kalamazoo College, where he majored in Religion and minored in Philosophy. He received his M.A. from the University of Chicago's Department of Far Eastern Languages and Civilizations in 1982, and his Ph.D. from the University of Chicago's Department of Far Eastern Languages and Civilizations in 1987, where his dissertation, "Of Heretics and Martyrs: Buddhism and Persecution in Meiji Japan" would eventually become an acclaimed work in the study of Japanese religion.

== Career ==
Ketelaar began his career in as an assistant professor in the Department of History and Philosophy at the University of North Florida from 1987 to 1989. In 1990, he became an assistant professor at Stanford University's Department of History, where he was tenured in 1996. In 1996, he assumed the role of professor at the University of Chicago's Department of History, Department of East Asian Languages and Civilizations, and the College. From 2013, he became an associated professor at the University of Chicago Divinity School, and in 2022, Numata Professor of Japanese Religions. Notably, in 2002 and 2003, Ketelaar was the Chair of the John Whitney Hall Book Prize selection committee. Ketelaar has also lead tours to Japan with the Smithsonian.

== Publications ==
=== Articles ===
- “The Siren Call of the Bush Warbler: Faith and Practice in Modern Japan” in a special edition of the Japanese Journal of Religious Studies (Spring 2022).
- "Shards from a Wooden Shoe Shop: Religious Experience, Historical Change, and Suzuki Daisetsu" in Japanese Journal of Religious Studies (2021)
- “The Buddha is Dead, Long Live the Buddha,” in Japan’s Past and Present, Kurt Almqvist, Yukiko D. Bergman, eds. (Axel and Margaret Ax:son Johnsons Foundation; 2020)
- “Putting the ‘ism’ in ‘Buddhism’: Objects, Objectification and a (Domestic) Japonisme” in Japanese Collections in European Museums V: With Especial Reference to Buddhist Art, Joseph Kreiner, ed. (Bonn, Bier’sche Verlagsanstalt, 2016).
- “Searching for Erotic Emotionality in Edo Japan,” chapter 8 in Values, Identity, and Equality in 18th – and 19th – Century Japan, co-edited Peter Nosco, James Ketelaar, and Yasunori Kojima, co-editors (Brill, 2015).
- “The Non-modern Confronts the Modern: Dating the Buddha in Japan,” in History and Theory: Studies in the Philosophy of History, Theme Issue 45: Religion and History, no. 4 2006.
- "Kaikyôron: Buddhism Confronts Modernity" in Zen Buddhism Today, no. 12, March, 1996.
- "Hokkaidô Buddhism and the Early Meiji State," in Helen Hardacre, ed., New Directions in the Study of Meiji Japan (Leiden: E.J. Brill, 1997).
- "The Reconvening of Babel: Eastern Buddhism and the 1893 World's Parliament of Religions," in the American Academy of Religion Classics in Religious Studies, no. 9, Eric Ziolkowski, ed., A Museum of Faiths: Histories and Legacies of the 1893 World's Parliament of Religions (Atlanta: Scholars Press, 1993).
- "Strategic Occidentalism: Meiji Buddhists at the World's Parliament of Religions," Fall 1991, Christian-Buddhist Studies (University of Hawaiʻi).

=== Books ===
- Ketelaar, J. E. (1990). Of Heretics and Martyrs in Meiji Japan: Buddhism and its Persecution. Princeton University Press. ISBN 978-0-691-02481-3. (Japanese translation published by Pelikan Press in 2006)
- Nosco, Peter; Ketelaar, James E.; Yasunori, Kojima, eds. (2015). Values, Identity, and Equality in Eighteenth- and Nineteenth- Century Japan. Brill. ISBN 978-90-04-30098-9.
- Nosco, Peter; Ketelaar, J. E.; Yasunori, Kojima, eds. (2016). Edo no naka no Nihon, Nihon no naka no Edo: Kachikan, Aidenteitei, Byoudou no shiten kara [Values, identity, and equality in eighteenth- and nineteenth-century Japan]. 江戶のなかの日本、日本のなかの江戶 (in Japanese). Tōkyō: Kashiwa Shobō. ISBN 978-4-7601-4759-5.
