= Sporza =

Belgian Dutch-language sports media brand

- Country: Belgium

Programming
- Language: Dutch

Ownership
- Owner: VRT

History
- Launched: 31 May 2004

Links
- Website: sporza.be

Sporza is a multimedia brand of Belgian public-service radio and television network VRT specifically for coverage of sporting events. These broadcasts are organised by the Flemish government and mainly publicly financed.

== History ==
=== Television network (2004) ===
Sporza originated as the third VRT network—in addition to VRT 1 and VRT Canvas/Ketnet—that only existed for 96 days from 31 May to 3 September 2004. The radio station of the same name on the medium wave (927 KHz AM) and DAB that covered sporting events was the successor of 927 Live, and continued to exist after that period. Various major sporting events were covered on the program prior, including the Summer Olympic Games. To guarantee normal programming on VRT1 and Ketnet during the 2004 Summer Olympics, VRT started the temporary third channel. Approval for cable companies in Brussels came in late March.

Another reason for establishing the Sporza television network was the protection of copyright. Belgian television pays for broadcasting rights to sport in Belgium, but not beyond. However, the sports competitions on VRT channels were also viewed widely in the Netherlands. To avoid additional costs and fines for this, Sporza was set up to only show in Belgium. As a consquence of airing the 2004 Tour de France, Dutch cable viewers only watched it on Nederland 2. The channel started in the second week of the 2004 French Open. In addition to sport programmes, the network also offered framework programs, including talk and quiz shows.

=== Multimedia (2004–present) ===
After closing the television network, Sporza continued to exist as a multimedia sports brand. All sports broadcasts on radio and television, such as Sporza at 12, take place under this name, as does its website. VRT also suggested the idea of giving the Sporza license to a publisher to set up a daily or weekly newspaper under the name.

== Current rights ==
=== Belgium ===
Sports	Competition/Tournament	Summary
Association football	Croky Cup	Shared with VTM

=== International ===
Sports	Country/Region	Competition/Tournament	Summary
Association football	Worldwide	FIFA World Cup	All matches live
Association football	Worldwide	FIFA Women's World Cup	Selected matches live, licensed by Eurovision
Association football	Worldwide	FIFA Youth World Cups	Selected matches of the men's and women's U- 20 and U- 17 World Cups live, licensed by Eurovision.
Association football	Europe	UEFA European Championship	All matches live
Association football	Europe	UEFA European Under-21 Championship	All matches live
Association football	Europe	UEFA Youth European Championships	Belgium matches live. Other matches of the men's and women's U- 19 and U- 17 European Championships also available on UEFA.tv.
Association football	Europe	UEFA Europa League	2 matches per week, licensed by Telenet and VOO
Cycling	Worldwide	UCI Road World Championships	
Cycling	Belgium	Tour of Belgium	
Cycling	Belgium	Ronde van Vlaanderen	
Cycling	Belgium	Tour de Wallonie	
Cycling	France	Tour de France	
Cycling	France	Tour de France Femmes	
Cycling	Italy	Giro d'Italia	
Cycling	Netherlands	Amstel Gold Race	
Cycling	Spain	La Vuelta	
Gymnastics	Worldwide	Gymnastics World Championships	

== Logos ==
Sporza logo used from 31 May 2004 until 2012

Sporza logo used from 2018 until 2026
