= VRT Canvas =

Belgian Dutch-language TV channel

- Current logo since September 2023
- Country: Belgium
- Broadcast area: Belgium, reaching bordering regions via overspill of the Belgian terrestrial network

Programming
- Picture format: 1080i HDTV (downscaled to 16:9 576i for the SDTV feed)

Ownership
- Owner: VRT
- Sister channels: VRT 1; Ketnet

History
- Launched: 1 December 1997
- Former names: BRT TV2 (1977–1991); BRTN TV2 (1991–1997); Canvas (1997–2023)

Links
- Website: www.canvas.be

Availability

Terrestrial
- Norkring (FTA DVB-T2): Channel 2 (SD)
- Digitenne (Netherlands): Channel 15 (HD)

Streaming media
- Ziggo GO (Netherlands): ZiggoGO.tv (Europe only)
- Belgacom TV Overal: Watch live (HD, Belgium only)
- VRT MAX: Watch Live (Belgium only)

VRT Canvas is a Belgian television channel of the Flemish public broadcasting organisation Vlaamse Radio- en Televisieomroeporganisatie (VRT). Specialising in both original and adaptations from western Europe and North America, the channel offers: in-depth news and current affairs, non-mainstream entertainment, documentaries, arthouse films, other cultural programming, and most recently additional children's programming.

== History ==
The channel was founded on 1 December 1997 as the successor to the second channel BRTN TV2 and timeshared with the children's channel Ketnet between 7 am and 8 pm until 30 April 2012. Ketnet moved to its own channel, initially timesharing with OP12, which allowed Canvas to became a standalone channel. During the weekend there are regular sports broadcasts aired under the brand name Sporza.

The current network director of VRT 2, the umbrella name for the two channels, is Bart De Poot.

Prior to the launch of VRT's third channel OP12, VRT Canvas broadcast from 8pm until around midnight to 1 am each evening. Since 27 October 2018, Ketnet Junior airs on Canvas every afternoon between 2 and 7 pm (Sunday until 6 pm), along with morning broadcasts on Ketnet.

After the rebranding of VRT 1, Canvas rebranded as VRT Canvas on 4 September 2023.

== Programming ==
=== Belgian ===
- De Afspraak
- Terzake
- VRT NWS Journaal
- The Deal with Iran

=== International ===
- 1992
- Afterlife
- Agatha Christie's Poirot
- The Americans
- Bancroft
- Below the Surface
- The Black Donnellys
- Blue Murder
- Borgen
- Bron/Broen
- Carnivàle
- Carrie and Barry
- Chef!
- Dark Heart
- DCI Banks
- Desperate Housewives
- Dynasties
- Earthflight
- Endeavour
- Episodes
- Extras
- Forbrydelsen
- The Handmaid's Tale
- Hidden
- Hotel Babylon
- Informer
- Inspector George Gently
- Inspector Morse
- The IT Crowd
- Jack Taylor
- Lewis
- Live from Abbey Road
- Luther
- Maigret
- Midnattssol
- Murder in Mind
- My Brilliant Friend
- Nature's Microworlds
- The Newsroom
- The Office
- Okkupert
- Psi Factor
- Pushing Daisies
- Sherlock
- Silent Witness
- Taggart
- Top Gear
- A Touch of Frost
- True Blood
- Wallander
- Whitechapel

== Logos and identities ==
Used from 1997 to 2008

Used from 2008 to 2015

Used from 2015 to 2020

Used from 2020 to 2023

== See also ==
- VRT 1
- BRTN TV2, former channel television in Belgium
- Ketnet
- Sporza
- Terzake
- List of television channels in Belgium
