= Ketnet =

Belgian children's television channel

- Logo used since October 23, 2024
- Country: Belgium
- Broadcast area: Belgium, reaching bordering regions via overspill of the Belgian terrestrial network

Programming
- Picture format: 576i SDTV

Ownership
- Owner: VRT
- Sister channels: VRT 1; VRT Canvas

History
- Launched: 1 December 1997 (on Canvas); 1 May 2012 (on VRT3)
- Former names: BRT TV2 (1977–1991); BRTN TV2 (1991–1997)

Links
- Website: www.ketnet.be (redirects to VRT MAX site)

Availability

Terrestrial
- Norkring (FTA DVB-T2): Channel 12
- Digitenne (Netherlands): Channel 31

Streaming media
- Yelo TV: Watch live (Belgium only)
- TV Overal: Watch live (Belgium only)
- TV Partout: Watch live (Belgium only)
- Ziggo GO (Netherlands): ZiggoGO.tv (Europe only)
- Bhaalu: Info

Ketnet is a Flemish public children's television channel in Belgium owned and operated by the VRT, Flemish public broadcaster. It broadcasts a mix of locally produced and imported productions on the VRT 3 channel from 6 am until 8 pm.

The preschool programmes are broadcast on Ketnet Junior between 10 am to 7 pm on VRT Canvas.

Its French-language counterpart is Auvio Kids TV on La Trois.

== History ==
The channel was created per an order of the Flemish government as BRTN was losing ratings to the commercial network VTM. A study showed that BRTN did not properly serve the 10-20 demographic, though it produced content for under-tens such as Musti and Samson en Gert, programs for tweens, teens and young adults practically disappeared.

On 1 December 1997, BRTN 2 was replaced by Canvas and Ketnet. The name Ketnet literally means "Kidsnet" with "Ket" being Antwerpian slang for "child". From the start of the channel, the program offering from Flemish soil has been diversified. The best-known and/or longest-running titles are Amika, Dag Sinterklaas, De Boomhut, Karrewiet, Kulderzipken, Mega Mindy, Samson en Gert, Spring, and W817. In addition, various foreign series are also purchased. There was also Studio Ket, which was not based on the Dutch Jeugdjournaal, as Ketnet opted to create its own format.

Ketnet started as a channel for 4 to 15-year-olds. From 5pm to 8pm (after which it handed over to Canvas), it provided programming for teens and young adults. Programs were broadcast to young teenagers such as Studio.Ket, King of the Hill, NBA Jam, Ultratop, Ready or Not and Married... with Children, among others. In its first two weeks on air, Ketnet managed to capture 8% of the 12-16 demographic after 6:30pm, which was the time VTM aired The Simpsons. In September 1999, the target group was changed to 4 to 12-year-olds, and no new teenage programs were purchased. Ultratop was last broadcast on 31 December 2000 and King of the Hill on 12 January 2001. Nowadays Ketnet broadcasts for 2 to 12-year-olds.

Since Ketnet underwent a major renewal operation in April 2006, many old (regular) programs have disappeared from the programming, including Zorro, Skippy, Tintin, Once Upon a Time..., The Busy World of Richard Scarry, Tik Tak, Bassie and Adriaan, Allemaal beestjes, Alfred J. Kwak, Hey Arnold!, Liegebeest, Postbus X and Pingu. Many of these programs were also broadcast by the predecessor BRTN TV2 before the creation of Ketnet.

On 1 May 2012, Ketnet has been moved on a new channel, timesharing with OP12. OP12 closed on 31 December 2014, leaving Ketnet alone in its capacity.

== Presenters ==
As with VRT's main television station één, Ketnet employs in-vision continuity announcers. In the case of Ketnet, the announcers also present various programmes for the station and are known as Wrappers.

== Logos ==
=== Ketnet ===
The first Ketnet logo, used from 1997 - 2006.

The second Ketnet logo, used from 2006 - 2010.

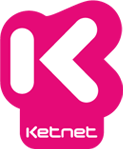
The third Ketnet logo, used from 2010 - 2015.

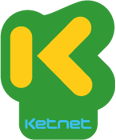
The fourth Ketnet logo, used from 2012 - 2015.

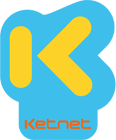
The fifth Ketnet logo, used until 31 August 2015

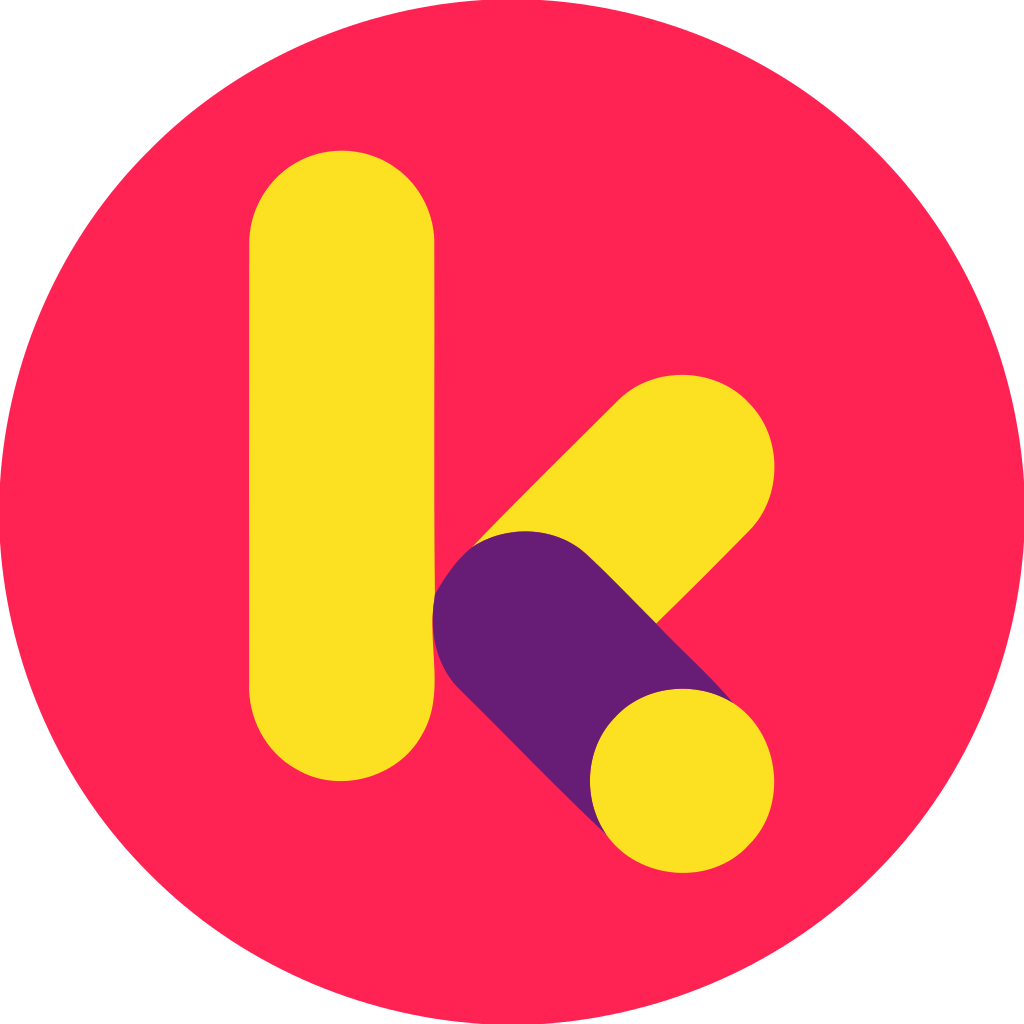
The sixth Ketnet logo, used from 2015 - 2021

The sixth Ketnet logo with text, used from 2015 - 2021

The seventh Ketnet logo, used from 2021 - 2024

=== Ketnet Junior ===
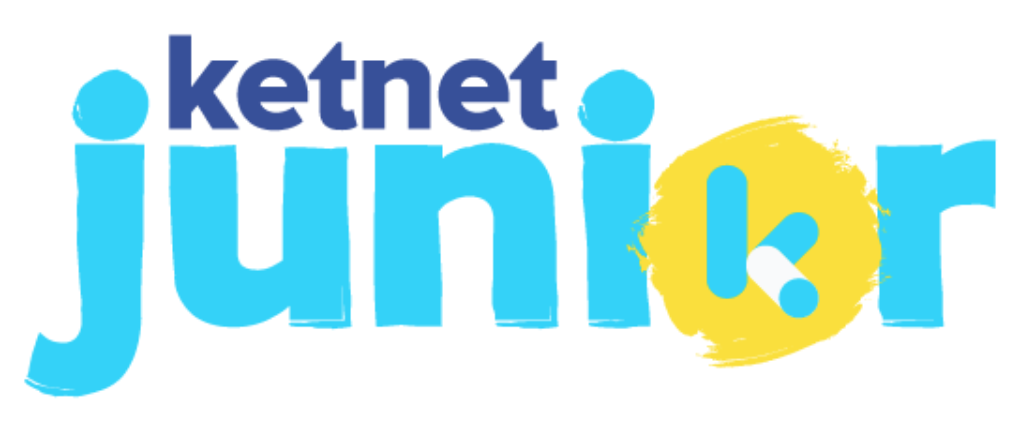
The second Ketnet Junior logo, used from 2018 - 2024

== KetnetRadio ==
On 17 November 2007, Ketnet launched KetnetRadio, an online radio station consisting of a looped 3-hour programme, broadcast for 24 hours. A new programme is produced and broadcast every day. KetnetRadio is presented by Ketnet presenter and continuity announcer Kristien Maes. Listeners can tune in on Ketnet's website.

== See also ==
- BRTN TV2, former channel television in Belgium
- List of television channels in Belgium
