= MNM (radio station) =

- Brussels; Belgium
- Broadcast area: Belgium (Flanders, Brussels)
- Frequencies: FM; 89.0 MHz (Antwerp); 101.5 (Ghent); 88.3 (Brussels); DAB: Block 12A (Online)

Programming
- Language: Dutch
- Format: Popular music station, youth, CHR

Ownership
- Owner: VRT

History
- First air date: 5 January 2009

Links
- Website: www.mnm.be

MNM is a Belgian pop music radio station, launched in 2009, operated by the Flemish public broadcaster Vlaamse Radio- en Televisieomroep (VRT). The station broadcasts in Flanders and Brussels on FM and can be heard in France and the Netherlands on border areas.

== History ==
On 5 January 2009, Peter van de Veire launched the new radio station. On 8 March 2010, the MNM logo had a small modification, the black letter M became blue, and modernized its studio and website.

On 28 March 2011, MNM added new jingles, a new programme (Sing Your Song) and two new radio hosts (Bert Beauprez, Renée Vermeire), the same year, and the slogan has changed from Let's Have a Big Time to Music and More.

During the 2018 Marathonradio event in June that year, MNM introduced a redesigned logo without the star as well as new graphics and a range of bright and bold colours.

In September 2024, MNM introduced a new pink-yellow logo and branding more in line with VRT's corporate rebrand, a new station schedule with a new breakfast show and a new slogan, "Make Life Sing!"

== Regular presenters ==
At the time of final broadcast, sorted alphabetically

- Tom De Cock (Saturday afternoons/evenings - De Cock Late Night)
- Evy Gruyaert (Weekday mid-mornings)
- Anneleen Liégeois (Travel presenter, Co-presenter - David in de ochtend)
- Kris Luyten (Travel presenter, co-presenter - ADH Dave)
- Dave Peters (ADH Dave)
- Marc Pinte (Stand-in for Elias Smekens and Sunday Match)
- Ann Reymen (Weekday lunchtimes)
- Elias Smekens (Breakfast on Saturdays, Sunday mornings)
- Ann Van Elsen (Sunday Match: 8pm - 11pm)
- Sofie Van Moll (Battle of the Stars)
- Thibaut Renard (Stereo Special)
- Bert Beauprez (Weekend)

== Programmes ==
Live presenter-led programmes are broadcast every day between 0600 and 2300. Between 2300 and 0600 (midnight and 0800 on Saturday night/Sunday morning), the station is automated and airs a mix of non-stop music and live, hourly news bulletins.

=== MNM Hits ===
MNM Hits is a digital-only station, which consists of continuous pop music without presenter interruption, which was called Donna Hitbits before the MNM rebranding.

== Logo and identities ==
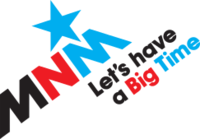
MNM logo used from 5 January 2009 to 8 March 2010

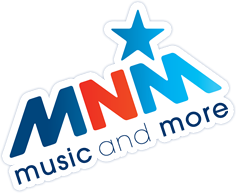
MNM logo used from 8 March 2010 to 26 August 2015

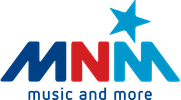
MNM logo used from 26 August 2015 to 3 June 2018

MNM logo used from 3 June 2018 to 2nd September 2024
