= VRT NWS =

Flemish public news channel

- Logo since August 2022
- Available in: Dutch; French; English; German
- Area served: Flanders, Belgium
- Owner: VRT
- Services: News
- Website: www.vrt.be/vrtnws/

VRT NWS (Note: Known as VRT Nieuws until 2017.) is the main news channel of the Flemish public broadcasting company VRT. It has an associated website which provides text articles on news, analyses, and general background information.

== Content ==
As the main news channel of the Flemish national broadcasting company VRT, VRT NWS is government funded, but its editors operate independently. VRT NWS is the main provider of audio-visual news in Dutch-speaking Belgium, with only one private company offering a comparable service. The VRT NWS website offers text articles all contemporary news, but also aims to provide more in depth-analyses as well as general background information. In addition to this content, the website also places a lot of stress on historical remembrance, with entire sections of its homepage dedicated to, for example, the events of World War I and II. VRT NWS targets a very broad audience with easily digestible texts and, together with De Standaard and De Morgen, cater to a large part of the Flemish population.

== Reception ==
A 2020 study of various popular Flemish news outlets found VRT NWS to be the most trusted among the Flemish public, adding that "The public broadcaster might not always be the most used news brand, but it is still the most trusted."
