= Klara (radio station) =

- Brussels; Belgium
- Broadcast area: Flanders
- Frequencies: FM: 89.5 Brussels and Flemish Brabant; 89.9 Limburg; 90.4 East and West Flanders; 92.0 Antwerp City; 96.4 Antwerp

Programming
- Language: Dutch
- Format: Classical music Jazz

Ownership
- Owner: VRT

History
- First air date: 2 December 2000

Links
- Website: klara.be

Klara is a Belgian radio station operated by the Flemish public broadcaster Vlaamse Radio- en Televisieomroep (VRT). Its output is primarily focussed on classical music, but also includes jazz and world music.

The name is derived from Klassieke Radio, which translates as "Classical Radio".

== History ==
Klara was launched on 2 December 2000 as successor to VRT Radio 3. The change of name marked the introduction of a new programming style aimed at broadening the appeal of VRT's classical music channel.

== Logos and identities ==
VRT Klara's logo used from 2 December 2000 to 31 January 2008.

VRT Klara's previous logo used from 1 February 2008 to 1 December 2020.

== See also ==
- List of radio stations in Belgium
