= Radio 1 (Belgium) =

Flemish radio station

- Belgium
- Broadcast area: Belgium also will be received radio in: Netherlands; Luxembourg; France; Germany
- Frequency: 91.7–99.9 MHz

Programming
- Language: Dutch
- Format: News, talk, sport

Ownership
- Owner: VRT

History
- First air date: 18 June 1930; 95 years ago

Links
- Website: www.radio1.be

Radio 1 is a Belgian radio channel operated by the Flemish public broadcaster Vlaamse Radio- en Televisieomroep (VRT).

The channel focuses on news (with bulletins every half hour), together with discussion and debate on public policy and social issues. Radio 1 also carries live coverage of sporting events, branded "Sporza Radio".

Radio 1's musical content is a mix of contemporary and classic pop and rock music (focusing on Flemish productions), with specialist music programming in the evening schedules.

== Logos and identities ==
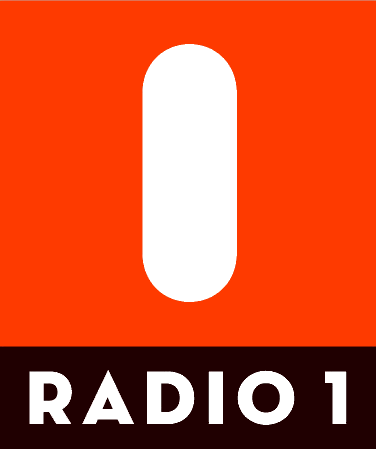
VRT Radio 1's logo used until January 2014.

Previous phase of VRT Radio 1's logo used until 2003.

VRT Radio 1's previous logo used until February 2025.

== Guest programmes ==
Radio 1 regularly allocates a limited amount of airtime for the transmission of so-called "guest programmes": that is to say, programmes produced by associations and organizations representing faith and other socio-philosophical communities recognized by the Flemish Government as having the right to make such broadcasts. At the present time (February 2014) these are:

- Centraal Israëlitisch Consistorie van België – representing Belgian Judaism
- Evangelische Radio en Televisie Omroep – Evangelical Christian broadcaster
- Radio Gezinsbond by the Gezinsbond – defending the interests of the family
- Het Vrije Woord by the Humanistisch-Vrijzinnige Vereniging – representing secularism and free thought
- Het Braambos by the Katholieke Televisie en Radio Omroep – Catholic broadcasting organization
- Moslim Televisie en Radio Omroep – Muslim broadcasting organization
- Orthodoxe Kerk in België – the Orthodox Church in Belgium
- Protestantse Omroep – Protestant Christian broadcaster
