= Radio Advertising Bureau (UK) =

The Radio Advertising Bureau (RAB) was an organisation funded by UK commercial radio stations to help advertising agencies advertise effectively on radio. In 2006, it merged with the Commercial Radio Companies Association (CRCA) to form Radiocentre, the industry body for UK commercial radio. Trading was however kept under the RAB name until 7 July 2015.
