= Terzake =

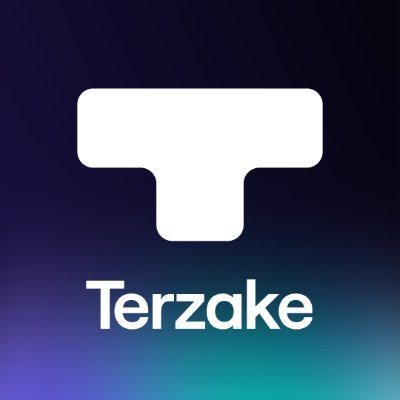
- Genre: Current affairs
- Presented by: Kathleen Cools, Annelies Beck, Stefaan Meerbergen
- Country of origin: Belgium
- Original language: Dutch

Production
- Producer: VRT
- Production location: Brussels
- Camera setup: Multi-camera

Original release
- Network: BRTN TV2 (1994–1997); VRT Canvas (1997–present)
- Release: 5 September 1994 – present

Terzake (Down to Business in Dutch) is a daily Flemish current affairs-program of the public broadcaster VRT and a part of the VRT News service. It is broadcast on the TV channel VRT Canvas. The first broadcast of the program was on Monday, 5 September 1994. Alain Coninx, Dirk Tieleman and Dirk Sterckx were the first presenters in its inception. It is currently presented in alternation by Kathleen Cools and Annelies Beck, with Stefaan Meerbergen as a substitute presenter.

== Broadcast ==
Initially the program aired at 8 pm but in August 2015, the program moved to a later hour. The show has since then returned to its original 8 pm slot.

The program consists mainly of a number of reports, interspersed with debates, a conversation with a guest in the studio or a new correspondent. Terzake is also repeated overnight until 9:00 a.m., except weekends and holidays. Many broadcasts were switched to the Rue de la Loi/Wetstraat in Brussels, where the political news is reviewed.

The producers of the program are Jasmin Dielens and Pascal Dossche.
