= VRT (broadcaster) =

Belgian national broadcaster for the Flemish community

Vlaamse Radio- en Televisieomroeporganisatie
- Type: Terrestrial radio, television and online news portal
- Country: Belgium
- Availability: Belgium; France; Luxembourg; Netherlands
- Headquarters: Reyers Tower, Brussels, Belgium
- Owner: Flemish Community
- Launch date: 1930; 96 years ago (radio); 1953; 73 years ago (television)
- Former names: NIR (1930–1960); BRT (1960–1991); BRTN (1991–1998)
- Official website: Official website

The Vlaamse Radio- en Televisieomroeporganisatie ("Flemish Radio and Television broadcasting organisation"), shortened to VRT (Dutch: [ˌveːjɛrˈteː]), is one of the national public service broadcasters for the Flemish Community of Belgium. Its counterpart in the French Community is the French-language RTBF (Radio-télévision belge de la Communauté française), and in the German-speaking Community it is BRF (Belgischer Rundfunk).

The VRT operates six television channels (VRT 1, VRT Canvas, Ketnet, Sporza, VRT NWS and VRT MAX) together with a number of radio channels, including Radio 1, Radio 2, Klara, Studio Brussel, and MNM.

== History ==
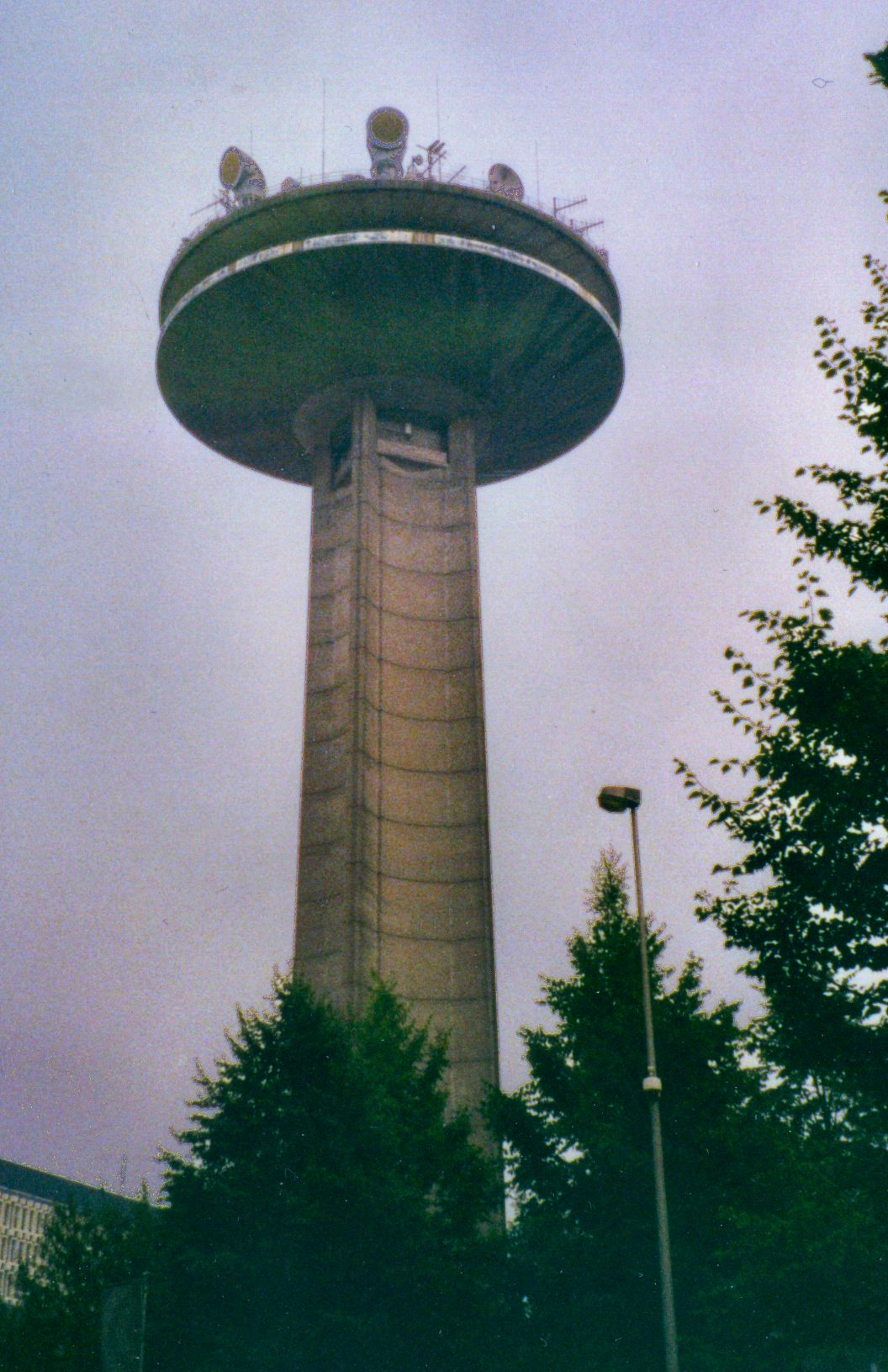
The communications tower at the VRT's headquarters in Brussels, the Reyers Tower

The VRT is the successor to a succession of organisations. Belgium's National Institute of Radio Broadcasting (INR-NIR) was founded in 1930 and existed until 1960. It was subsequently split along linguistic lines with Dutch language programming becoming the Belgische Radio- en Televisieomroep (BRT) in 1960 and the Belgische Radio- en Televisieomroep Nederlandstalige Uitzendingen (BRTN) from 1991 to 1998.

The NIR/INR and BRT (French: Radio-Télévision Belge; RTB) had each been single state-owned entities with separate Dutch- and French-language production departments. They were housed in the Flagey Building, also known as the Radio House, from when the new building was completed in 1938 until 1974 when the building became too small. However, in 1977, as part of the ongoing state reform in Belgium broadcasting became reserved to the language communities rather than the national government. Accordingly, BRT/RTB went their separate ways in 1977. While the former French half changed its name to RTBF in 1977, the Dutch side retained the BRT name until becoming BRTN in 1991. However, the two broadcasters share production facilities on Auguste Reyerslaan in Brussels.

The final renaming of the VRT, on 1 January 1998, followed a change in the organization's legal status. From being part of a semi-governmental entity (a parastatale in Belgian terminology) it had, on 16 April 1997, become a publicly owned corporation (NV van publiek recht) in its own right.

As successors to the NIR/INR, the VRT and its counterpart in the French Community of Belgium, RTBF, share the Belgian membership in the European Broadcasting Union (EBU). Along with RTBF, it is one of the 23 founding members.

With the ending of its television monopoly – marked by the creation of VTM, a commercial television company that initially captured more than half of the VRT's audience – the public broadcaster has been compelled to fight back, and part of its successful response has been the use of external production houses such as Woestijnvis, the creator of such formats as De mol and Man bijt hond.

== Television channels ==
Television channels are transmitted on:

- Cable to all Belgian and Dutch cable providers;
- Satellite with paid TV Vlaanderen subscription (encrypted DVB-S2 using SES Astra network).
- Terrestrial with paid TV Vlaanderen subscription (encrypted DVB-T2 using Norkring network) in Flanders and paid Digitenne subscription (encrypted DVB-T2) in the Netherlands. Free-to-air DVB-T broadcast by the VRT was discontinued on 1 December 2018.
- IPTV to all major Belgian internet providers (Proximus, Orange, Scarlet);

=== Current channels ===
- VRT 1, the main channel, formerly known as Eén and TV1. Started in 1953 on VHF channel 10. In PAL colour since 1971. In 1977 the transmission standard changed from Belgian 625 to European CCIR) standard.
- VRT Canvas, the quality TV channel. Began broadcasting in December 1997, originally timeshared with Ketnet before it became a standalone channel in May 2012.
- Ketnet, the children's channel launched in May 2012. Formerly timeshared with Canvas's channel from 6 a.m. to 8 p.m.
- Sporza, is a multimedia brand and sports division. It is name given to the sport's programming broadcast on the above channels and as a program on Radio 1. It was originally created as a third standalone channel that was broadcast temporarily for 96 days in summer 2004 and was also a radio station (the successor to 927Live) from May 2004 until October 2017. During major sports events (such as the Olympics) it is not uncommon for two or more channels to simultaneously air Sporza.
- VRT NWS, the news service.
- VRT MAX, the on demand service.

The VRT's third television channel, known as VRT3, was launched in May 2012. It is not a full-fledged television channel because it has no name, identity or logo. It broadcasts programs from the above channels in a shared schedule under the respective titles "Één+" and "Canvas+".

=== Former channels ===
TV2 logo (1994–1997)

- BRTN TV2, the broadcasters second channel, was launched on 26 April 1977 as BRT TV2. The channel offered a daily current affairs program (Terzake), an evening news bulletin (Het Journaal), arts and cultural programs alongside extended broadcasts of major sporting events, such as the Olympic Games, football and cycling races. Children's programs and family-friendly films were broadcast in the morning and afternoon, ending around early evening often in collaboration with Nederlandse Onderwijs Televisie (NOT; Netherlands Educational Television). It was broadcast until 30 November 1997, when TV2 was closed and ceased transmission. On 1 December 1997, BRTN TV2 was split into two distinct time-shared channels: BRTN Ketnet and BRTN Canvas. The two channels were part of BRTN until 1998 and were split in May 2012; Canvas and Ketnet are still broadcasting as part of VRT2, the official umbrella name for the channels, Sporza and the small Flemish church broadcasters.
- OP12 (Dutch for: on twelve) was a third channel used as a backup in the event of primetime shortage, mostly used for excess sports and culture programs. It was launched in 2012 but due to financial cutbacks was discontinued in 2014.
- BVN was a joint Dutch-Flemish TV station for international audiences; some VRT programmes aired as part of BVN's schedule. The VRT left the BVN venture in July 2021; the channel is currently owned exclusively by the Dutch public broadcaster NPO and airs an exclusively Dutch schedule.

== Radio channels ==
The VRT broadcasts radio channels in both analog format (FM) and digital format (using DAB+). All channels are also broadcast live over the Internet at Radio Plus. International broadcasting was done via the VRT's Radio Vlaanderen Internationaal (RVi).

=== Regular channels ===
- Radio 1 – info channel
- Radio 2 – Flemish channel
- Klara – classical channel
- Studio Brussel – alternative channel
- MNM – hit channel

=== Digital and streaming-only channels ===
- De Tijdloze – uninterrupted alternative classics
- Klara continuo – uninterrupted classical music
- MNM Hits – uninterrupted popular music
- Radio Bene – uninterrupted music from Flemish artists
- VRT NWS – latest news programme continuously repeated

=== Streaming-only channels ===
- Radio 1 Classics – uninterrupted classic songs
- Radio 2 Unwind
- Ketnet Hits – uninterrupted kids' music
- Studio Brussel De Jaren Nul
- Studio Brussel UNTZ
- Studio Brussel Vuurland
- Studio Brussel Zware Gitaren – uninterrupted heavy music

=== TMC ===
They also have a Traffic message channel (TMC) service transmitted on VRT Radio2.

== Logo history ==
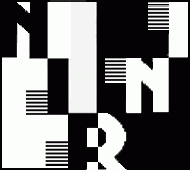
NIR logo (1953–1960)

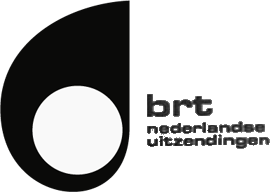
VRT's third and older logo used from 1967 to 1979.

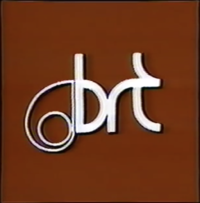
BRT logo (1979–1991)

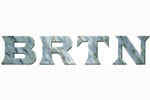
BRTN logo (1991–1998)

VRT logo (1998–2002)

VRT's sixth logo used from 7 January 2002 to 21 June 2017.

VRT's seventh logo from 22 June 2017 to July 2021.

VRT's eighth logo from July 2021 to 29 August 2022.

VRT's ninth and current logo as of 29 August 2022.

== See also ==
- Bert De Graeve, former CEO
- Tony Mary, former CEO
- List of radio stations in Belgium
- List of television stations in Belgium
