= Pacific Rim =

Land area comprising the rim of the Pacific Ocean

Countries in blue border the Pacific Rim

The Pacific Rim comprises the lands around the Pacific Ocean. It roughly overlaps with the geological Pacific Ring of Fire. The Pacific Rim encompasses approximately 41 sovereign states, and 14 semi-autonomous states. There are 25,000 landmasses in the Pacific Ocean located between mainland Asia and the Americas. The majority of these are either their own countries or are part of Pacific Rim countries in mainland Asia and the Americas. Certain islands in the Pacific Ocean are also overseas territories of European countries in the Atlantic Rim.

== Definition ==
The term "Pacific Basin" includes both the Pacific Rim and the islands in the Pacific Ocean, which are often ignored in Pacific Rim frameworks. The "Pacific Basin" has also been used to exclusively refer to the islands in the Pacific Ocean (sometimes including Australia, New Guinea, New Zealand, the Philippines and other large landmasses), but not the mainland rims of Asia and the Americas, which are separately referred to as the Pacific Rim under this framework. The term "The Pacific" often takes on a similar meaning, with the mainland rims of Asia and the Americas being excluded, and other large landmasses sometimes being included depending on the context. Some rare definitions of the Pacific Rim define it to exclude both the Asian and American mainlands and also the islands in the central Pacific. This defines the Pacific Rim as only including insular areas which are outside the main insular cultural zones of Melanesia, Micronesia and Polynesia, such as Australia, Japan, Indonesia, the Philippines, the Aleutian Islands and the Galápagos Islands. The term "North Pacific Rim" has been used by some historians to refer to the subarctic island region of the far north Pacific, including Japan's Hokkaido, Russia's Sakhalin and Kuril Islands and Alaska's Aleutian Islands.

The term "Asia Pacific" originated around the 1970s, and became a way to describe the Pacific Rim without including the Pacific coast of the Americas. It also sometimes includes landlocked Asian countries like Mongolia and South Asian countries like India who only border the Indian Ocean. Historically, the term "Indo-Pacific" has been used to refer to a tropical biogeographical region covering the entire Indian Ocean and sections of the western Pacific, including Northern Australia, Melanesia, Micronesia, Polynesia (excluding New Zealand), Southeast Asia and the part of East Asia south of the main Japanese islands. In the 21st century, Indo-Pacific has increasingly been used to denote a geopolitical region. The broadest definition of the Indo-Pacific as a geopolitical region includes the entire Pacific Rim and Pacific Basin, as well as any country or island touching Indian Ocean waters. However, Indo-Pacific is often geopolitically used in a similar manner to the term Asia-Pacific, since it does not typically include Indian Ocean-adjacent parts of the Middle East and East Africa, in addition to not typically including the Pacific coast of the Americas.

== Organizations ==
A national park in Canada's Vancouver Island was named after the Pacific Rim, while in mainland Vancouver, there is a hotel named Fairmont Pacific Rim. Whidbey Island in the U.S. state of Washington also has an organization named the Pacific Rim Institute for Environmental Studies. The Pacific Rim Mining Corporation is based in Vancouver, although its exploration activities have been concentrated in the Americas, including the Central American Pacific Rim country El Salvador. Between 2009 and 2016, it became involved in a major investment arbitration dispute concerning the proposed El Dorado gold project in El Salvador. The dispute arose after El Salvador refused to grant a mining concession for the El Dorado project.

Various intergovernmental and non-governmental organizations focus on the Pacific Rim, including Asia-Pacific Economic Cooperation (APEC), Association of Pacific Rim Universities, Comprehensive and Progressive Agreement for Trans-Pacific Partnership (CPTPP), the East-West Center, Sustainable Pacific Rim Cities, the Pacific Basin Institute and the Institute of Asian Research. In addition, the RIMPAC naval exercises are coordinated by United States Pacific Command. The Pacific Rim International Conference on Artificial Intelligence (PRICAI) is an annual event dedicated to exploring AI theories, technologies, and applications across areas of scientific, social, and economic importance for the Pacific Rim. It has been held since 1990, including in Nagoya, Japan (1990), Seoul, South Korea (1992), Beijing, China (1994), Cairns, Australia (1996), Singapore (1998), Melbourne, Australia (2000), Tokyo, Japan (2002), Auckland, New Zealand (2004), Guilin, China (2006), Hanoi, Vietnam (2008 and 2021), Daegu, South Korea (2010), Kuching, Malaysia (2012), Gold Coast, Australia (2014), Phuket, Thailand (2016), Nanjing, China (2018), Fiji (2019), Yokohama, Japan (2020), Shanghai, China (2022), Jakarta, Indonesia (2023), Kyoto, Japan (2024), Wellington, New Zealand (2025) and Guangzhou, China (2026). Japan's Okinawa Pan Pacific International Film Festival is a film festival dedicated to films from every country in the Pacific Rim/Basin. The region hosts several international sporting competitions using “Pan Pacific” or “Pacific” in their names. These competitions encompass Pacific Rim countries from the Americas such as the United States, and include the Pan Pacific Swimming Championships, first held in 1985 and now including non-Pacific Rim countries, the Junior Pan Pacific Swimming Championships for junior swimmers, the Para Pan Pacific Swimming Championships, the Toray Pan Pacific Open women's tennis tournament in Japan, the international Pacific Nations Cup rugby union tournament and the Pan Pacific Masters Games, a large multi-sport masters event held on Australia's Gold Coast. From 1978 to 1980, a Eurovision-inspired singing competition titled the Pacific Song Contest was held. It featured contestants from Australia, Canada, Hong Kong, Japan, Mexico, New Zealand, the Philippines, Taiwan and the United States. The first two editions were held in the New Zealand city of Christchurch, while the third edition was held in the Canadian capital Ottawa.

Asia-Pacific Economic Cooperation (APEC) was co-founded by Australia and Japan in 1989, who since the 1970s had been working together on establishing other Pacific organizations. It had the title "Asia-Pacific" since it was originally envisioned to only include western Pacific countries who are in Asia or adjacent to Asia. However, Canada and the United States eventually became part of APEC's initial membership, and during the 1990s it expanded to include several Latin American countries bordering the Pacific. The APEC Summit is the annual top-level meeting of the 21 APEC economies, and has been held since 1989, including in Canberra, Australia (1989), Singapore (1990 and 2009), Seoul, South Korea (1991), Bangkok, Thailand (1992, 2003 and 2022), Blake Island, Washington, United States (1993), Bogor, Indonesia (1994), Osaka, Japan (1995), Manila, Philippines (1996 and 2015), Vancouver, Canada (1997), Kuala Lumpur, Malaysia (1998 and 2020), Auckland, New Zealand (1999 and 2021), Bandar Seri Begawan, Brunei (2000), Shanghai, China (2001), Los Cabos, Mexico (2002), Santiago, Chile (2004 and 2019), Busan, South Korea (2005), Hanoi, Vietnam (2006), Sydney, Australia (2007), Lima, Peru (2008, 2016 and 2024), Yokohama, Japan (2010), Honolulu, United States (2011), Vladivostok, Russia (2012), Bali, Indonesia (2013), Beijing, China (2014), Da Nang, Vietnam (2017), Port Moresby, Papua New Guinea (2018), San Francisco, United States (2023), Gyeongju, South Korea (2025) and Shenzhen, China (2026). Australia, New Zealand and Papua New Guinea are the only countries who are members of both APEC (an organization dedicated to large Pacific Rim countries) and the Pacific Islands Forum (an organization dedicated to smaller Pacific island countries). The Pacific Islands Forum Leaders Meeting is the annual summit of Pacific Islands Forum member leaders, and since 1971 it has been held in Wellington, New Zealand (1971), Canberra, Australia (1972 and 1983), Apia, Samoa (1973, 1987, 2004 and 2017), Rarotonga, Cook Islands (1974, 1985, 1997 and 2012), Nukuʻalofa, Tonga (1975, 1988, 2007 and 2024), Aiwo, Nauru (1976, 1993 and 2001), Port Moresby, Papua New Guinea (1977 and 2015), Alofi, Niue (1978 and 2008), Honiara, Solomon Islands (1979, 1992 and 2025), Tarawa, Kiribati (1980, 1989 and 2000), Port Vila, Vanuatu (1981, 1990 and 2010), Rotorua, New Zealand (1982), Funafuti, Tuvalu (1984 and 2019), Suva, Fiji (1986), Palikir, Federated States of Micronesia (1991, 1998 and 2016), Brisbane, Australia (1994), Madang, Papua New Guinea (1995 and 2005), Majuro, Marshall Islands (1996 and 2013), Koror, Palau (1999, 2014 and 2026), Auckland, New Zealand (2003 and 2011), Nadi, Fiji (2006), Cairns, Australia (2009), Yaren, Nauru (2018) and Avarua, Cook Islands (2023).

APEC and the CPTPP are the two largest economic-based Pacific Rim organizations, although in 2024, the CPTPP admitted the United Kingdom as its first non-Pacific Rim member, with other non-Pacific Rim countries like Argentina, Ukraine, Uruguay and the United Arab Emirates expressing interest in joining. Since 2019, CPTPP Commission meetings have been held in Tokyo, Japan (2019), Auckland, New Zealand (2019 and 2023), Singapore (2022), Vancouver, Canada (2024) and Melbourne, Australia (2025). The CPTPP is a legally binding free trade agreement, unlike APEC, which is based around general economic cooperation. The CPTPP was first signed in 2016 as the TPP (Trans-Pacific Partnership), and included the United States but not China (who are both APEC members), as it was originally envisioned by Barack Obama's government as a way to counter Chinese economic influence by imposing a rules-based order. The TPP's direction shifted on January 23, 2017, when newly inaugurated U.S. President Donald Trump signed an executive order formally pulling the United States out of the deal. Trump pulled out of the deal as part of his broader "America First" economic outlook, as he viewed the TPP as benefiting foreign countries at the expense of American workers. Following the American withdrawal, the remaining eleven members salvaged the initiative by signing the renamed CPTPP in March 2018, which officially entered into force in December 2018.

In April 2011, an organization called the Pacific Alliance was formed among Latin American Pacific Rim countries. The Pacific Alliance currently has four full members: Chile, Colombia, Mexico and Peru. Costa Rica and Ecuador are pursuing full membership, while Singapore has become the first external country to obtain Associated State status. Other non-Latin American Pacific countries (Australia, New Zealand, Canada, and South Korea) are candidates for Associated State status, while countries such as Japan, China, and Indonesia participate only as observers, along with several countries outside the Pacific Rim. It is sometimes seen as a counterpart to the Mercosur trade agreement among Atlantic Latin American countries. However, the Pacific Alliance is generally more outward-looking toward Asia-Pacific trade and liberalisation, whereas Mercosur, founded in 1991 by Argentina, Brazil, Paraguay and Uruguay, has historically focused more heavily on South American regional integration and a common market.

=== List of Pacific Rim institutions ===
==== Political blocs and trade agreements ====
===== Asia-Pacific Economic Cooperation (APEC) =====
- Australia
- Brunei
- Canada
- Chile
- China
- Hong Kong
- Indonesia
- Japan
- Malaysia
- Mexico
- New Zealand
- Papua New Guinea
- Peru
- Philippines
- Russia
- Singapore
- South Korea
- Taiwan
- Thailand
- United States
- Vietnam

===== Comprehensive and Progressive Agreement for Trans-Pacific Partnership (CPTPP) =====
- Australia
- Brunei
- Canada
- Chile
- Japan
- Malaysia
- Mexico
- New Zealand
- Peru
- Singapore
- United Kingdom^{[note1]}
- Vietnam

===== Melanesian Spearhead Group (MSG) =====
- Fiji
- New Caledonia
- Papua New Guinea
- Solomon Islands
- Vanuatu

==== Micronesian Islands Forum (MIF) ====
- Federated States of Micronesia
- Guam
- Marshall Islands
- Nauru
- Northern Mariana Islands
- Palau

==== PACER Plus ====
- Australia
- Cook Islands
- Kiribati
- Nauru
- New Zealand
- Niue
- Samoa
- Solomon Islands
- Tonga
- Tuvalu
- Vanuatu

==== Pacific Alliance ====
- Chile
- Colombia
- Mexico
- Peru

==== Pacific Community (PC) ====
- American Samoa
- Australia
- Cook Islands
- Federated States of Micronesia
- Fiji
- France^{[note1]}
- French Polynesia
- Guam
- Kiribati
- Marshall Islands
- Nauru
- New Caledonia
- New Zealand
- Niue
- Northern Mariana Islands
- Palau
- Papua New Guinea
- Pitcairn Islands
- Samoa
- Solomon Islands
- Tokelau
- Tonga
- Tuvalu
- United Kingdom^{[note1]}
- United States
- Vanuatu
- Wallis and Futuna

==== Pacific Economic Cooperation Council (PECC) ====
- Australia
- Brunei
- Canada
- Chile
- China
- Colombia
- Ecuador
- Hong Kong
- Indonesia
- Japan
- Malaysia
- Mexico
- Mongolia^{[note1]}
- New Zealand
- Pacific Islands Forum
- Peru
- Philippines
- Singapore
- South Korea
- Taiwan
- Thailand
- United States
- Vietnam

==== Pacific Islands Forum (PIF) ====
- Australia
- Cook Islands
- Federated States of Micronesia
- Fiji
- French Polynesia
- Kiribati
- Marshall Islands
- Nauru
- New Caledonia
- New Zealand
- Niue
- Palau
- Papua New Guinea
- Samoa
- Solomon Islands
- Tonga
- Tuvalu
- Vanuatu

==== Pacific Islands Forum Fisheries Agency (FFA) ====
- Australia
- Cook Islands
- Federated States of Micronesia
- Fiji
- Kiribati
- Marshall Islands
- Nauru
- New Zealand
- Niue
- Palau
- Papua New Guinea
- Samoa
- Solomon Islands
- Tokelau
- Tonga
- Tuvalu
- Vanuatu

==== Polynesian Leaders Group (PLG) ====
- American Samoa
- Cook Islands
- Easter Island
- French Polynesia
- Hawaii
- New Zealand
- Niue
- Samoa
- Tokelau
- Tonga
- Tuvalu
- Wallis and Futuna

==== South Pacific Defence Ministers' Meeting (SPDMM) ====
- Australia
- Chile
- Fiji
- France^{[note1]}
- New Zealand
- Papua New Guinea
- Tonga

==== Other organizations ====
===== Association of Pacific Rim Universities (APRU) =====
- Australia
- Brunei
- Canada
- Chile
- China
- Ecuador
- Hong Kong
- Indonesia
- Japan
- Malaysia
- Mexico
- New Zealand
- Philippines
- Russia
- Singapore
- South Korea
- Taiwan
- Thailand
- United States
- Vietnam

===== Pacific Aviation Safety Office (PASO) =====
- Australia
- Cook Islands
- Fiji
- Kiribati
- Nauru
- New Zealand
- Niue
- Papua New Guinea
- Samoa
- Solomon Islands
- Tonga
- Tuvalu
- Vanuatu

===== Pacific Tourism Organisation (SPTO) =====
- American Samoa
- Cook Islands
- Easter Island
- Federated States of Micronesia
- Fiji
- French Polynesia
- Kiribati
- Marshall Islands
- Nauru
- New Caledonia
- Niue
- Papua New Guinea
- Samoa
- Solomon Islands
- Timor-Leste
- Tokelau
- Tonga
- Tuvalu
- Vanuatu
- Wallis and Futuna

== Demographics ==
China, Russia and the United States, often considered the world's three "superpowers", all have Pacific coastlines, although the majority of Russia's population lives significantly further away in the European-adjacent regions of the country. Most Russians living near the Pacific coast and on the islands of Sakhalin and the Kuril Islands are ethnic Russians of Caucasian origin, rather than Indigenous natives like the Nivkhs.

Among Pacific Rim states, Christianity is the dominant religion in American Samoa, Australia, Canada, Chile, Colombia, Costa Rica, Ecuador, El Salvador, Fiji, French Polynesia, Guam, Guatemala, Honduras, Kiribati, Mexico, Nauru, New Caledonia, Nicaragua, Niue, Norfolk Island, Palau, Panama, Papua New Guinea, Peru, Russia, Samoa, the Cook Islands, the Federated States of Micronesia, the Marshall Islands, the Northern Mariana Islands, the Philippines, the Solomon Islands, the United States, Timor-Leste, Tokelau, Tonga, Tuvalu, Vanuatu and Wallis and Futuna. There is also a sizable Christian population in South Korea. Orthodox Christianity is the least widespread form of Christianity in the Pacific Rim, mainly being prevalent in Russia and areas of Russia's former colony Alaska, such as the Aleutian Islands and Kodiak Island. Unalaska in the Aleutian Islands still has a Russian Orthodox church on the island, which was built during the era of Russian rule. Kodiak Island also has Orthodox churches from the era of Russian rule. Sunni islam is the main religion in Brunei, Indonesia and Malaysia, and Muslims still make up a meaningful proportion of the Pacific Rim's total population, due to Indonesia's large population. Buddhism is the primary religion in Cambodia, Singapore, Taiwan and Thailand. Religious unaffiliation is high in China, Hong Kong, Japan, New Zealand, North Korea and South Korea.

When compared to the Atlantic Rim, the Pacific Rim has a significantly smaller population of African diaspora, with many of them living on the Pacific coast of the United States (particularly Southern California). The Pacific coast of Latin America generally has less of an African-influence than the Caribbean coast of Latin America, although some areas such as Colombia have sizable African descended populations on the Pacific coast. In recent decades, Australia has also experienced some African immigration, primarily from South Sudan and the Horn of Africa. The term "the Black Pacific" has sometimes been used to historically frame African populations in Pacific coastal areas of Latin America (such as those in Colombia), although the term "the Black Pacific" has also been used to refer to Melanesia and occasionally Indigenous Australia.

=== Human settlement ===
Human occupation across these regions predates European contact by thousands to tens of thousands of years. The East Asia and Southeast Asia areas were settled by modern Homo sapiens roughly 60,000–80,000 years ago, Australia was reached by Aboriginal ancestors between 50,000 and 65,000 years ago and the Americas were populated via Beringia and coastal routes approximately 15,000–30,000 years ago. Most Pacific islands were settled in two distinct phases; Near Oceania (Melanesia) was first reached 40,000–50,000 years ago, while Remote Oceania (Micronesia, Polynesia, and New Zealand) was settled by Austronesian seafarers between 3,500 and 700 years ago, with New Zealand being the last settlement. Some islands outside these regions, like Indonesia, Taiwan and the Philippines, have varying links to Austronesians and Melanesians, while other islands in the Pacific, like the Aleutian Islands and the Japanese archipelago, had different settlement histories from Melanesia, Micronesia and Polynesia, with the Aleutian Islands being settled from Beringia roughly 9,000 years ago and Japan at least 38,000 years ago by Indigenous hunter-gatherers. Following European exploration and initial contact between the 15th and 17th centuries, the Americas, Australia and New Zealand developed overwhelmingly European-settler majority populations. Between 1800 and 1925 alone, approximately 48 million European emigrants moved to the Americas, Australia and New Zealand. Conversely, mainland and island Asia, as well as Melanesia, Micronesia, and Polynesia, largely retained their original demographic makeup. Russia is an exception, and the Russian Far East is one of the only areas on the western side of the Pacific with a European-majority population, along with Australia and New Zealand.

Various islands in the Pacific Rim remain uninhabited by civilians. Many of these islands are in the eastern Pacific and have no Indigenous populations, such as France's Clipperton Island, Costa Rica's Cocos Island, Chile's Desventuradas Islands and Mexico's Revillagigedo Islands. Several U.S. islands in the central Pacific are also uninhabited by civilians, including Baker Island, Howland Island, Jarvis Island, Johnston Atoll, Kingman Reef, Midway Atoll, Palmyra Atoll and Wake Island. Most of the Aleutian Islands at the far western end of the chain have been uninhabited since the 18th, 19th or early 20th centuries, like Amchitka Island, Attu Island and Kiska, although these lands were historically inhabited by the Aleut people. During World War II, Japan briefly invaded the Aleutian Islands, including Attu, which had the last civilian population left at the far western end of the chain. The 42 native Aleuts living on Attu were taken by the Japanese to a prison camp in Hokkaido, with roughly half dying from disease and starvation there. Since World War II, nearly the entire western end of the chain has been uninhabited, and Attu and Kiska are no longer safe for habitation, as the Japanese left an extensive amount of booby traps and land mines on the islands, which could still explode. Amchitka Island is currently uninhabitable for different reasons, as the U.S. government conducted nuclear tests on the island between 1965 and 1971, with it being chosen due to its remote location and lack of human activity. Shemya Island was an exception to the postwar depopulation of the far western Aleutians, remaining one of the few islands in the region with a non-civilian human population after World War II, largely because of its continued military use. The island was developed as a U.S. Army air base in 1943 during the Aleutian Islands campaign, and after the war it was retained as a military installation because of its strategic position on the Great Circle Route between North America and Asia. During the Cold War, Shemya became an important U.S. military and intelligence outpost, hosting facilities for missile and space surveillance and strategic reconnaissance operations because of its proximity to the Soviet Union. With the end of the Cold War, however, military activity on the island declined substantially; the installation was placed on caretaker status in 1995, greatly reducing the number of military personnel stationed there, although a small permanent population remained to operate and maintain the facilities.

Clipperton Island is a highly isolated atoll in the same general eastern Pacific area as Ecuador's populated Galápagos Islands. Unlike Galápagos, it has almost no natural freshwater supply suitable for sustaining a permanent population and little arable land, making habitation exceptionally difficult. Its geographic location subsequently led to a sovereignty dispute between France and Mexico; Mexico, whose Pacific coast is the nearest American mainland to Clipperton at roughly 1,100–1,300 km away, established a human settlement there in the early 20th century in an effort to reinforce its claim. The settlement depended on regular supplies from Acapulco, but the Mexican Revolution disrupted those shipments, leaving the inhabitants increasingly without food or other necessities. Most died from scurvy, malnutrition and related issues, and the remaining community endured a catastrophic breakdown of social order, with some being murdered. The survivors were rescued by the USS Yorktown in July 1917. Afterward the island was abandoned as a permanent settlement, although the United States briefly used it during World War II. Clipperton has remained uninhabited since 1945, with subsequent human presence consisting principally of occasional French naval visits and scientific expeditions. France's sovereignty was ultimately confirmed by international arbitration in 1931.

The Bonin Islands and Volcano Islands (currently part of Japan) were first recorded by Europeans in the 16th century as uninhabited islands. Their extreme isolation subsequently produced an unusually high level of endemism through long-term evolution of species that reached the islands by chance. In the Bonin Islands, around 40% of the vascular plants, 25% of the insects, and more than 90% of the land-snail species are endemic, leading to comparisons with the Galápagos Islands, which similarly were long uninhabited and developed high levels of endemism. From 1830, however, the Bonin Islands developed a permanent settler population of diverse backgrounds, including Europeans, Americans, Hawaiians and people of other Pacific origins, before Japanese colonization expanded later in the 19th century; the resulting community developed a distinctive mixed cultural identity. The more remote Volcano Islands only received a human population in 1887, through Japanese laborers. Iwo Jima, the southernmost of the Volcano Islands, later became a heavily fortified Japanese military position and in 1945 the site of the Battle of Iwo Jima, one of the most famous and costly battles of World War II. Chile's Juan Fernández Islands and the Galápagos Islands were also discovered uninhabited in the 16th century, and these two locations developed settler populations drawn largely from the adjacent South American mainland, subsequently adopting the cultural and linguistic norms of their parent countries. Galápagos was incorporated into Ecuador in 1832 and later attracted settlers from mainland Ecuador (known as the Galapagueños), while permanent settlement in the Juan Fernández Islands developed under Chilean administration and was reinforced by Chilean settlers alongside immigrants from Europe. In the 19th and 20th centuries, the governments of Chile and Ecuador also experimented with using the islands as prisons, due to their isolated geography. Britain, France and Russia utilized Australia, New Caledonia and Sakhalin as prisons around this same time for similar reasons.

The Pitcairn Islands and Australia's Norfolk Island were both settled by Europeans after being discovered uninhabited, but each had evidence of earlier Polynesian activity. On Pitcairn, early European visitors found numerous Polynesian artefacts, including stone adzes, religious carvings, burial sites and earth ovens, indicating an earlier settlement whose precise date and origins remain uncertain; Pitcarn was later permanently settled in 1790 by the mixed Anglo-Tahitian community descended from the British Bounty mutineers. Norfolk Island likewise preserves clear archaeological evidence of a previous Polynesian settlement, particularly at Emily Bay, dated broadly to about AD 1150–1450 or the 13th–15th centuries, before the island was found uninhabited by Europeans in 1774 and colonized by Britain in 1788. Australia's Lord Howe Island, on the other hand, is notably different, since extensive archaeological investigation has found no evidence of prehistoric activity from Polynesians or any other humans before European arrival. The island's first known European sighting was in 1788; permanent settlement followed in 1834.

=== Population distribution ===
Population density in Australia.

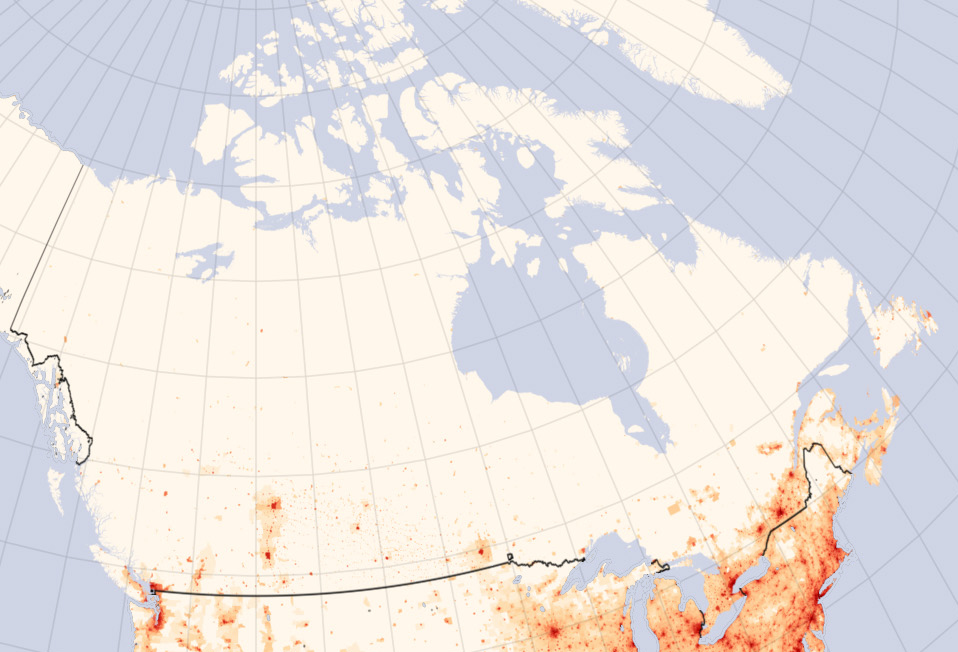
Population density in Canada and the northern United States.

Mainland Australia is overwhelmingly coastal in terms of population: about 87% of Australia's mainland population lived within 50 kilometres of the coast in 2019. Its largest population concentrations are on the eastern and southeastern seaboard, facing the Pacific, while Perth and Adelaide are the only other major population centers outside this broad eastern concentration. Inland settlement remains comparatively sparse, with Alice Springs being the best-known major inland center, serving as a regional administrative, transport and services hub despite its location in the extremely dry central Australian interior.

Canada displays a comparable concentration of population in its more temperate southern regions, particularly near the United States–Canada border. Nearly two-thirds of Canadians lived within 100 kilometers of the United States border in the 2006 census, while the interior and north are much more sparsely populated. Fertile agricultural land, transportation networks and a milder climate encouraged settlement in the south, whereas large areas of the Canadian Shield have thin or nutrient-poor soils, and the northern landscape presents additional difficulties from extreme cold, permafrost and limited infrastructure. Whitehorse, in the Yukon interior, demonstrates that substantial urban settlement is nevertheless possible in Canada's north: it has become the territory's dominant population center and regional service hub despite a dry subarctic climate with very cold winters, in a role that is broadly comparable to Alice Springs in central Australia.

In the 21st century, the private Century Initiative has advocated increasing Canada's population to 100 million by 2100, with the principal population growth envisaged in already-populated urban and economic regions rather than throughout the country; the Government of Canada has explicitly stated that the 100 million figure is not government policy. At the same time, Canada's Arctic sea ice has declined substantially and the ice-free season is projected to lengthen further with global warming, potentially improving seasonal marine access to parts of the north. This could make a larger share of Canada's territory more economically accessible over the long term.

China was the world's most populous country until India overtook it in 2023. From the late 1970s, China implemented the one-child policy to slow rapid population growth, later easing it to a two-child policy in 2016 and a three-child policy in 2021. As China's birth rate and number of women of childbearing age have declined, government policy has increasingly shifted from restricting births toward encouraging them, including measures intended to reduce the costs of raising children.

==== Urban centers ====
Pacific-facing cities can be defined as cities situated on the open Pacific Ocean itself, or on one of its marginal seas, bays, gulfs, or straits. For example, the Australian Hydrographic Office considers the city of Melbourne to be facing the broader Pacific Basin, because it lies on Port Phillip Bay, which connects through Bass Strait to the waters of the Tasman Sea, a marginal sea of the South Pacific. In Australia, some of the largest Pacific-facing urban areas are Sydney (5,638,830 in 2025), Melbourne (5,435,590), and Brisbane (2,833,524), using the Australian Bureau of Statistics' estimates as of June 30, 2025. In New Zealand, Auckland had an estimated 1,547,200 residents in 2025, while Christchurch had 419,200 and Wellington 210,800, using Stats NZ estimated resident populations for the corresponding territorial or urban areas. In Melanesia, major coastal centers include Port Moresby in Papua New Guinea (413,223 in 2025), Suva in Fiji (225,882), Honiara in the Solomon Islands (131,149), Nouméa in New Caledonia (124,060) and Port Vila in Vanuatu (about 58,000), with these figures based on 2025 United Nations data. Among Polynesian urban centers, Honolulu in Hawaii had 344,977 residents in 2024 within the Urban Honolulu census-designated place, while Papeete in French Polynesia had an estimated 92,406 in 2025 and Apia in Samoa about 40,407. Other principal Polynesian settlements include Pago Pago in American Samoa, Nuku'alofa in Tonga, Avarua in the Cook Islands and Funafuti in Tuvalu. In Micronesia, major population centers include South Tarawa in Kiribati (40,311 in 2025), Saipan in the Northern Mariana Islands, Majuro in the Marshall Islands, Dededo in Guam, Koror in Palau and Palikir in the Federated States of Micronesia, although many of these territories are dominated by settlements and villages rather than conventionally defined cities.

In the eastern Pacific, the largest settlements of the Galápagos Islands include Puerto Ayora (12,737 inhabitants in the 2022 Ecuadorian census) and Puerto Baquerizo Moreno (7,290), while Hanga Roa on Easter Island had 7,163 inhabitants in the 2017 Chilean census. Mexico's volcanic Guadalupe Island had 213 inhabitants in the country's 2010 census, although more recent estimates have placed the number of permanent residents below 150. Its small population consists mainly of fishermen and their families, with these fishermen living on their own settlements, including Campo Norte ("North Camp") and Campo Oeste ("West Camp"). The only other volcanic island group in the eastern Pacific with a permanent population is the Juan Fernández Islands, and their principal settlement at San Juan Bautista on Robinson Crusoe Island, which had 839 inhabitants in the 2017 Chilean census. The wider Juan Fernández commune had 926 inhabitants that year and was projected to have 1,104 residents in 2024. There are several larger continental islands off the coast of the Americas, notably Vancouver Island in Canada, whose principal settlements include Victoria (91,867 inhabitants in 2021) and Nanaimo (99,863), Chiloé Island in Chile, whose principal settlements include Castro (25,416 in the 2017 census) and Ancud (17,896 in the urban census district), and the Channel Islands off California, where Avalon on Santa Catalina Island is the principal incorporated settlement, with 3,460 inhabitants in the 2020 census. Canada's Haida Gwaii archipelago is located much further north of Vancouver Island, in a less densely populated region of Canada. There is no conventionally defined city in Haida Gwaii, and the archipelago had about 4,761 inhabitants in 2008.

In mainland North America, major Pacific-facing cities include Los Angeles in the United States (12,740,420 in 2025), San Francisco (3,163,486), San Diego (1,915,114), Vancouver in Canada (1,707,865) and Tijuana in Mexico (1,557,695), using 2025 urban-area estimates from the United Nations. Mexico's Pacific coast also contains substantial cities such as Acapulco (699,888 in 2025) and Mazatlán (409,143). The U.S. cities of Los Angeles, San Francisco and San Diego are all part of California, with the largest U.S. Pacific city outside of that state being Seattle in Washington. According to the United Nations, Seattle had a population of 1,403,495 in 2025. In Central America, Panama City in Panama had an urban-area population of 1,527,393 in 2025, while other Pacific-facing centres include Puntarenas and Golfito in Costa Rica, La Libertad and Acajutla in El Salvador, Puerto Quetzal in Guatemala, and Corinto and San Juan del Sur in Nicaragua. In South America, the largest Pacific-facing urban areas include Lima in Peru (10,580,241 in 2025), Guayaquil in Ecuador (3,157,825), Trujillo in Peru (949,018), Valparaíso in Chile (861,145), Concepción in Chile (516,741), Buenaventura in Colombia (438,063) and Manta in Ecuador (287,756). Lima is the most heavily populated city facing the South Pacific or its open seas, having double the population of Sydney in Australia. Indonesia's Jakarta has a significantly higher population than both Lima and Sydney, but borders a highly enclosed marginal sea area of the South Pacific.

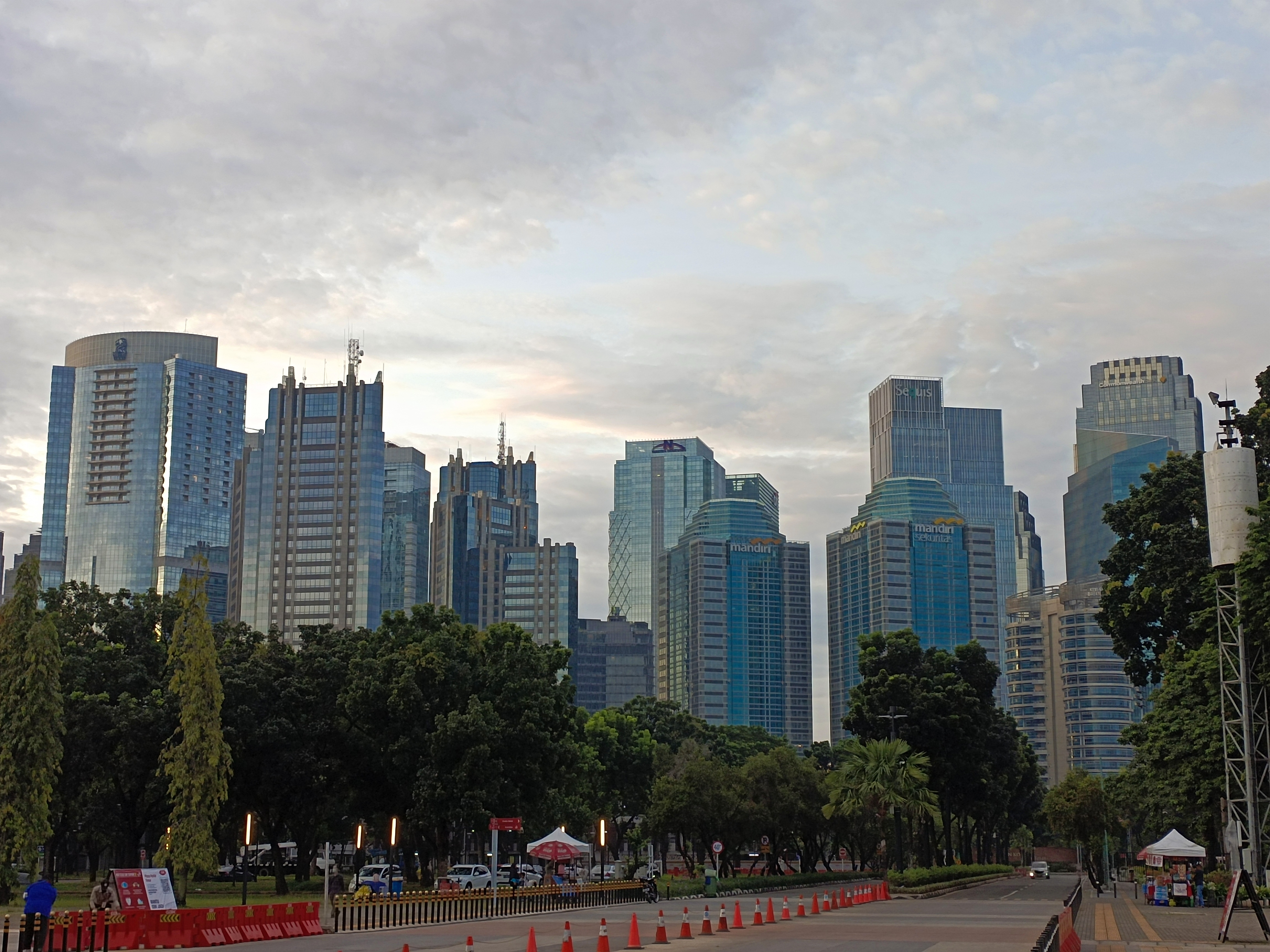
Jakarta, Indonesia, the most heavily populated metropolitan area in the Pacific Rim.

Several of the world's largest urban concentrations are located around the Pacific's East Asian margins. Tokyo in Japan had an estimated 33,412,512 inhabitants in 2025, Shanghai in China 29,558,908, Guangzhou 27,563,372, Shenzhen 13,878,396, Seoul in South Korea 22,490,482, Busan 3,263,221 and Kaohsiung in Taiwan 2,187,455; these figures use the UN's harmonised Degree of Urbanization methodology and therefore differ from figures based on municipal or metropolitan administrative boundaries. Hong Kong and Macau, both special administrative regions of China, are also major Pacific-facing urban centres, although their populations are normally reported using their own administrative boundaries rather than the same international urban-area definition. In Southeast Asia, major Pacific-connected urban centres include Jakarta in Indonesia (41,913,860 in 2025), Manila in the Philippines (24,735,305), Bangkok in Thailand (18,180,280), Ho Chi Minh City in Vietnam (14,052,713), Surabaya in Indonesia (6,843,503), Singapore (4,963,998), Dili in Timor-Leste (345,038), Phnom Penh in Cambodia (2,261,055) and Bandar Seri Begawan in Brunei (roughly 240,000). Kuala Lumpur in Malaysia is sometimes included in Asian Pacific Rim urban comparisons because Malaysia is a Pacific Rim state, but the city itself is inland.

In the Russian Far East, the largest population centers include Vladivostok, the region's principal Pacific port, with about 600,000 inhabitants in the mid-2020s, and Petropavlovsk-Kamchatsky with about 180,000. On Russia's North Pacific island Sakhalin, the largest city is Yuzhno-Sakhalinsk, with roughly 180,000 residents. On the neighboring Kuril Islands, settlements are much smaller, with Yuzhno-Kurilsk on Kunashir Island generally the largest at around 7,000 residents, followed by Kurilsk on Iturup and Severo-Kurilsk on Paramushir. On the Aleutian Islands in the North Pacific, the largest incorporated settlement is Unalaska, on Unalaska Island, which had 4,254 residents in the 2020 United States census, substantially larger than Adak Island, which had 171. Adak once had a population of roughly 5,000–6,000 people during its period as a major United States Navy base, but its population collapsed when military personnel and their families began leaving the island in March 1997. Abandoned infrastructure from before March 1997 still remains on Adak, including a McDonald's restaurant. Outside the Aleutian Islands, inhabited Pacific islands in Alaska include Kodiak Island, whose city of Kodiak had 5,581 residents in the 2020 census, Baranof Island, where the city and borough of Sitka had 8,458, St. Lawrence Island, where Savoonga (835) and Gambell (640) together had 1,475, Nunivak Island, where Mekoryuk had 206, the Pribilof Islands, where St. Paul and St. George had about 480 combined in 2020, and Little Diomede Island, where the incorporated city Diomede had 83. Baranof Island is part of the Alexander Archipelago in southeastern Alaska, a vast island group containing around 1,100 islands. Revillagigedo Island (not to be confused with Mexico's volcanic Revillagigedo Islands) is the Alexander Archipelago's most populous island, with 13,948 inhabitants in the 2020 census, mainly around the city of Ketchikan and surrounding communities.

=== Migration between Pacific Rim Nations ===
Migration among Pacific Rim nations has often been shaped by war, political upheaval, and economic opportunity. The Vietnam War and its aftermath produced major Vietnamese refugee movements across the Pacific, with communities eventually established in countries such as the United States, Canada, Japan, and Australia; Australia, for example, had 318,760 Vietnamese-born residents by 2024, while California had roughly 770,000 people of Vietnamese background in 2025. Many Cambodians fleeing the Khmer Rouge initially sought refuge in Southeast Asian countries before many were resettled elsewhere in the Pacific Rim. Political repression following the 1973 Chilean coup under Augusto Pinochet produced another significant Pacific migration; Australian government records show that the Chilean-born population rose sharply after the coup, reaching 18,740 by 1981, while Canada received nearly 13,000 Chilean refugees between 1973 and 1978. UNHCR records also estimated that around 3,000 Chileans entered Peru by the end of 1974.

Migration from Mexico and Central America to the United States has likewise been substantial, driven by a mixture of economic pressures, violence, political instability and family networks; Mexico has long been the principal country of origin for migrants entering the United States, while refugees and asylum seekers from El Salvador, Guatemala and Honduras have also travelled north through Mexico toward the United States. Mexico itself is a migration destination for asylum seekers from El Salvador, Guatemala and Honduras, with citizens from these countries often entering Mexico to escape crime and violence. During the Salvadoran Civil War, roughly half a million Salvadorans sought refuge in the United States. Australia also received refugees from El Salvador during this civil war, with about 10,000 accepted under its Special Humanitarian Program between 1983 and 1986. These Salvadorans and their descendants continue to live in Australia, primarily in Melbourne. During the 2010s, El Salvador and Honduras both became known as the "murder capital of the world", with Honduras' homicide rate reaching 90 per 100,000 inhabitants in 2011, and El Salvador's homicide rate spiking to 104 per 100,000 inhabitants in 2015. Since the end of the country's civil war in 1992, El Salvador experienced severe levels of crime due to the rival MS-13 and 18th Street gangs, with these two gangs having originated from Salvadorans who migrated to Los Angeles during the civil war in the 1980s. Under President Nayib Bukele, El Salvador has recorded a dramatic decline in reported homicides since 2019, with the government attributing the reduction to its Territorial Control Plan and broader security measures. The administration has also promoted economic and social programs that it says are intended to address conditions that encourage migration out of El Salvador.

A notable example of climate-related migration is the Falepili Union between Australia and the Pacific island country Tuvalu, which is increasingly affected by rising sea levels. The Falepili Union established a special permanent-residency pathway allowing up to 280 Tuvaluans each year to live, work and study in Australia. In the first 2025 ballot, around 8,750 Tuvaluans (roughly 82% of Tuvalu’s population) were reported to have applied or been included in applications, demonstrating the strong demand for the pathway amid concerns over the effects of climate change. Korean migration to Japan has a long history; large numbers of Koreans moved, or were compelled to move, to Japan during the period of Japanese colonial rule, creating the Zainichi Korean community. While many descendants have remained in Japan, the community has historically experienced discrimination, including restrictions on citizenship and employment and other forms of institutional and social discrimination. Across the South Pacific, migration between Australia and New Zealand is particularly close because of the Trans-Tasman Travel Arrangement, but the flow has historically been much larger from New Zealand to Australia than in the opposite direction. The Australian government estimates about 670,000 New Zealand citizens live in Australia compared with around 75,000 Australians in New Zealand.

Migration across the Pacific Ocean also links Australia and New Zealand with the United States and Canada, with movement typically occurring for employment, education and family. Beyond migration, Australia is the third largest source of tourism for Canada's Pacific province British Columbia, behind only China and the United States. In 2011, Australia was also recorded as being the largest source of tourism for the U.S. Pacific state of Alaska. Since 2004, an annual Australia Week has been organized by the Australian Consul General in Los Angeles, to help promote Australian business, tourism, culture and sport across the United States. Migration and cultural exchange between these countries has produced notable sporting successes in both directions; Mason Cox, born in Texas, moved to Australia and became a professional Australian rules football player with the Collingwood Football Club, while numerous Australians have established careers in North American professional sports, including NBA players such as Josh Giddey, Patty Mills and Joe Ingles and NFL players including Jordan Mailata, Michael Dickson and Mitch Wishnowsky.

=== Language ===
==== Mainland Asia ====
Cambodia is predominantly Khmer speaking, alongside Indigenous languages such as Bunong, Jarai and Kuy. China is dominated by Standard Chinese (Mandarin), but contains major regional varieties such as Cantonese, Wu, Min, Hakka and Xiang, as well as Indigenous and minority languages including Tibetan, Uyghur, Mongolian, Kazakh, Korean and Zhuang. Macau uses Cantonese, Portuguese and Mandarin.

Malaysia uses Malay as the national language, with English, Chinese languages and Tamil also being spoken, alongside the numerous Indigenous languages of Borneo, including Iban and Kadazan-Dusun. North Korea and South Korea are overwhelmingly Korean-speaking, although differing political terminology and orthographic conventions have developed on the two sides of the peninsula. South Korea also uses Korean Sign Language and English is increasingly understood, with nearly all Koreans under 40 having received formal English instruction as a compulsory subject through the national school curriculum. Russia includes Russian as the dominant language alongside numerous Indigenous and regional languages, such as those in its Far Eastern areas. Thailand is dominated by Thai but includes Isan, Northern Thai, Southern Thai, Malay, Karen languages and other minority languages. Vietnam uses Vietnamese alongside numerous minority languages including Khmer, Hmong, Cham, Tày, Nùng and Jarai.

==== North Pacific Ocean ====
Taiwan uses Mandarin together with Taiwanese Hokkien, Hakka and numerous Indigenous Austronesian languages such as Amis, Atayal, Paiwan and Bunun. China's Hainan has a highly diverse linguistic landscape shaped by migration and contact among Sinitic, Kra–Dai, Hmong–Mien and Austronesian peoples. Hainanese is the island's most widespread Chinese variety, with the Wenchang dialect traditionally prestigious. The Hlai languages, including the divergent Jiamao, are major Kra–Dai languages of the central and southern interior, while Lingao and Cun are other Kra–Dai languages spoken in the northwestern and western parts of the island. Miao languages are also spoken on the island. Around the island's resort city Sanya, Tsat is spoken by the Utsul people; it is an Austronesian Chamic language shaped by contact with Hlai, Hainanese, and Mandarin. Mandarin increasingly serves as Hainan's lingua franca and dominates education, government, and interethnic communication, while many local varieties are declining across generations. Standard Mandarin is used throughout the Zhoushan Archipelago, which consists of 1,390 islands situated off Zhejiang province. The traditional local vernacular is Zhoushan speech (舟山话), a variety of Wu Chinese belonging to the Northern Wu group, specifically the Mingzhou subgroup, and closely related to the Ningbo dialect. Although the dialects spoken across the islands are relatively similar, regional differences exist, partly reflecting historical migration and contact between coastal communities. Small Fujian-origin fishing settlements speaking Southern Min were also historically documented around Shenjiamen and on other islands.

Following its 1842 cession to Britain, Hong Kong Island became the center of colonial government, commerce, and justice in Hong Kong. In Victoria City, English dominated government, law, and international finance, and institutions such as the University of Hong Kong reinforced its importance among islanders. Kowloon and the New Territories are part of Hong Kong but located on the Asian mainland, and developed as predominantly Cantonese-speaking areas, with minority languages like Hakka and Tanka also being spoken.

Singapore has four official languages—English, Malay, Mandarin Chinese and Tamil—while Singaporean multilingualism also includes numerous Chinese, South Asian and Southeast Asian languages. Brunei primarily uses Malay, with English and Chinese varieties also widespread. Spanish was once the official language of the Philippines, but now Filipino and English are the official languages, alongside numerous regional and Indigenous languages such as Cebuano, Ilocano and Hiligaynon. Japan is predominantly Japanese-speaking, with Korean, Chinese and other immigrant languages also present. Japan's Ryukyu Islands have historically spoken Ryukyuan languages, while Japan's northernmost island Hokkaido has historically spoken Ainu, with the Ainu language now being critically endangered on Hokkaido. The Kuril Islands are predominantly Russian-speaking today, while Kuril Ainu was historically spoken there and is now extinct. Sakhalin historically and currently has languages including Nivkh, Ainu (historically), Orok and Evenki, although Russian is now dominant. On the Aleutian Islands, Unangam Tunuu (Aleut) is the principal Indigenous language historically associated with the archipelago, with English now dominant. The Pribilof Islands in the Bering Sea have a long linguistic association with Unangam Tunuu (Aleut), particularly in the communities of St. Paul and St. George, although like on the Aleutian Islands, English is now dominant in everyday public life. The Pribilof variety has been documented as a distinct regional form of Unangam Tunuu. Among other Alaskan Bering Sea islands, St. Lawrence Island is associated with Siberian Yupik, while the traditional language spoken on Nunivak Island is Cup'ig (also spelled Cup'ik), which is a distinct regional dialect of the Central Alaskan Yupʼik. On Little Diomede Island in the Bering Strait, the local Indigenous language is Iñupiaq, specifically the Bering Strait variant, which is also spoken in nearby Bering Strait communities; English is now also widely used. The Kodiak Archipelago, including Kodiak Island and Afognak Island, is traditionally associated with Alutiiq, specifically the Koniag dialect of the language. The Alaska Native Language Center describes Alutiiq as a Pacific Gulf variety of the Yupik languages, with Koniag Alutiiq spoken on Kodiak Island and historically on Afognak Island, prior to its abandonment after the 1964 Alaska earthquake. Tlingit is the principal traditional language of the Alexander Archipelago. Haida has traditionally been spoken on the southern part of Prince of Wales Island, the fourth largest island of the archipelago. Elsewhere on the archipelago, Tsimshian has been spoken at Metlakatla on Annette Island since the migration of Tsimshian people there from British Columbia in 1887.

Haida Gwaii in British Columbia is the historic homeland of the Haida people, and the Haida language remains the principal Indigenous language associated with the archipelago. The language has distinct Old Massett and Skidegate varieties, and Haida and English are now the official languages of the Haida Nation. Vancouver Island has historically been home to several unrelated Indigenous languages, reflecting the island's position at the meeting point of the Wakashan and Salishan language families. Nuu-chah-nulth is traditionally spoken along the west coast, while Kwak'wala is associated particularly with northern Vancouver Island and adjacent mainland communities. Hul’q’umi’num’, a Coast Salish language, has its Vancouver Island variety on southeastern Vancouver Island, and SENĆOŦEN, a Northern Straits Salish language, is traditionally associated with the Saanich peoples at the island's southeastern end. Ditidaht and other Wakashan languages have also been spoken in western Vancouver Island. Washington's San Juan Islands are located in the Salish Sea between Vancouver Island and the mainland of Washington, and historically, the islands were home to Indigenous Coast Salish peoples. Their languages on the islands included Northern Straits Salish and related languages, spoken by communities such as the Lummi, Samish, Saanich and Songhees. English has historically been used on San Francisco's Farallon Islands. The islands have no well-documented history of a permanent resident Indigenous-language community, although they were nevertheless known to Indigenous peoples of San Francisco, and the Coast Miwok referred to them as the "Islands of the Dead". English became the main language of official administration on Alcatraz Island in the San Francisco Bay, particularly during its use as a prison between 1859 and 1963. The island lies within the traditional territory of the Ramaytush peoples, although evidence for a specific Indigenous language spoken on the island is lacking. As a prison, the island held inmates of various linguistic backgrounds, including 19 Indigenous Hopi men in 1895. Southern California's Channel Islands have a much more diverse linguistic history than other Californian islands. The four northern islands, San Miguel, Santa Rosa, Santa Cruz and Anacapa, were associated primarily with the Chumash people, whose Chumash languages were used in the island communities. Surviving ethnographic records preserve Chumash names and vocabulary from the islands, including the name limuw for Santa Cruz Island. The southern Channel Islands, particularly Santa Barbara, San Nicolas, Santa Catalina and San Clemente, were associated with the Tongva people, whose language was a Uto-Aztecan language historically spoken in the Los Angeles region and the southern islands. San Nicolas Island was also home to the now-extinct Nicoleño language, which is classified within the Uto-Aztecan family and preserves connections with several other Southern Californian languages, including Tongva.

In Micronesia, Guam uses English and Chamorro, with Chamorro remaining the principal Indigenous language; Marshall Islands uses Marshallese and English; the Federated States of Micronesia uses English nationally alongside major state languages including Chuukese, Pohnpeian, Kosraean and Yapese; Northern Mariana Islands uses English, Chamorro and Carolinian and Palau uses Palauan and English, with Japanese historically influential. Aside from Palau, other Micronesian islands were also historically influenced by the Japanese language in earlier colonial times. Japanese became an important language in areas like the Federated States of Micronesia and the Northern Marianas under Japanese rule in the early 20th century. The Spanish language was used in administration and missionary work during the earlier Spanish colonial period of the Micronesia region. Some Micronesian islands also had periods of German administration prior to Japan's expansion into the region in the early 20th century. Hawaii is the only Polynesian island group in the North Pacific, and was originally predominantly Hawaiian-speaking, with Hawaiian serving as the principal language of government, education and everyday life during the Hawaiian Kingdom. Following the overthrow of the monarchy in 1893 and U.S. annexation in 1898, English increasingly displaced Hawaiian, particularly after the 1896 Act 57 made English the medium and basis of instruction in schools. At the same time, successive waves of migration brought languages including Japanese, Chinese, Portuguese, Korean and Filipino to the islands.

On Mexican islands in the Gulf of California, Indigenous languages are principally associated with the Seri people, whose traditional territory included Tiburón Island, San Esteban Island and the adjacent coast of Sonora. The Seri language (Cmiique Iitom) is a language isolate, with no demonstrated genealogical relationship to any other language family; the National Institute of Indigenous Languages (INALI) recognizes it as the sole language in the Seri linguistic family. The language is now spoken primarily in the mainland Mexican communities of Punta Chueca and El Desemboque de los Seris, while Tiburón Island itself is uninhabited but remains communally owned by the Seri people and is regarded by them as a sacred place. The wider Gulf of California contains numerous other islands like Isla Ángel de la Guarda, but most are uninhabited or lack evidence of long-term island-specific language communities. The Tres Marías Islands are situated roughly 100 kilometers off Mexico's open Pacific coast, and were discovered uninhabited by Europeans, with no clear traces of earlier settlement. Spanish became the principal language associated with the islands, especially after Isla María Madre became a federal penal colony in 1905. The colony operated until 2019, after which the islands were designated for conservation and tourism. Colombia's Gorgona Island is believed to have had prehistoric Indigenous activity, but there is no evidence for a surviving island-specific Indigenous language, and Spanish became dominant during the island's modern settlement history. Gorgona is notable for its former island prison, which operated from 1960 to 1984 and housed thousands of prisoners from across Colombia; it formed part of the same Latin American island-prison model as Mexico's Isla María Madre. During the final years of the prison in the 1980s, a community known as Huisitó was established for Indigenous prisoners from the Colombian region of Cauca, and these prisoners potentially brought several linguistic traditions onto the island. Spanish is the principal language used by park authorities and visitors on Coiba Island, off the Pacific coast of southwestern Panama. Before Spanish colonisation, the island was inhabited by Indigenous peoples whose language was recorded by early Spanish chroniclers as Ngäbere. The Indigenous population was displaced during the 16th century, and the island remained largely uninhabited until a penal colony was established in 1919. The penal colony closed in 2004, and the island has served as a nature reserve since then.

In the eastern Pacific, there are remote islands of volcanic origin which have no civilian populations, but which still use Spanish as an official administrative language. These include Colombia's Malpelo Island, Costa Rica's Cocos Island and Mexico's Revillagigedo Islands. The uninhabited Clipperton Island uses French as an official administrative language. Spanish was briefly spoken on Clipperton during Mexico's failed human settlement attempt in 1910–1917. On Guadalupe Island, the principal civilian language is Spanish, reflecting its incorporation into Mexico.

==== South Pacific Ocean ====
There are several other volcanic islands in the eastern Pacific that lie below the equator, and these have more human activity than the ones above the equator. The Galápagos Islands speak Spanish due to being part of Ecuador, while English is common in its tourism industry. Historically, small immigrant communities from Europe have also spoken international languages on the islands, including settlers from Germany and Norway. The principal civilian language on the Juan Fernández Islands is Spanish. The traditional Polynesian language Rapa Nui has been preserved on Easter Island, although the Spanish language is also now common on the island, following its annexation by Chile in 1888. Chile's volcanic Desventuradas Islands and Salas y Gómez Island are uninhabited by civilians and Spanish is used as the administrative language. On continental Chilean islands, Spanish is now the dominant language, but several island groups have distinctive Indigenous linguistic histories. The Chiloé Archipelago, together with the Chonos Archipelago and Guaitecas Archipelago farther south, was historically associated with the Chono people, whose language, known as Chono or Wayteka, is very poorly documented and whose precise genetic classification remains uncertain. A small number of Chono place names survive in the southern Chiloé and Guaitecas region. Spanish is now also the predominant language spoken in Tierra del Fuego, an archipelago at the southern tip of South America, divided between Argentina on the Atlantic side and Chile on the Pacific side. Historically, the main island Isla Grande de Tierra del Fuego was home to the Indigenous Selk'nam and Haush languages, while Yaghan was spoken along the southern coasts and on outlying islands such as Navarino Island and the Wollaston Islands. The Kawésqar language was historically spoken by Indigenous communities across the western parts of the Tierra del Fuego archipelago, particularly in its outlying islands and channels extending towards mainland Patagonia. The Indigenous inhabitants of Chile's Santa María Island were the Mapuche, who speak Mapudungun and have a significant presence in other areas of Chile.

Australia is predominantly English-speaking but retains a large number of Aboriginal and Torres Strait Islander languages, including Pitjantjatjara, Warlpiri, Arrernte, Djambarrpuyngu, Tiwi and Yolŋu Matha, as well as Australian Kriol and Torres Strait Creole. Tasmania and its outlying islands formerly contained numerous Indigenous languages, with estimates generally ranging from about eight to twelve or more, rather than a single Tasmanian language. Distinct varieties were associated with different regions and islands, including the southeastern language associated with Bruny Island and languages of the Bass Strait Islands; colonization caused all of the original languages to cease being transmitted as complete community languages. The modern palawa kani language was reconstructed from surviving wordlists, historical records and remembered material from several of these original languages, and is now used in Aboriginal communities across Tasmania and on the Bass Strait islands. The Ngugi people of Australia's Moreton Island traditionally spoke Guwar (also known as Gowar, Goowar or Gooar), a now extinct language whose classification remains debated, with some research grouping it with the Bandjalangic languages and identifying substantial influence from Yagara. After Lord Howe Island was discovered uninhabited by Europeans in 1788, English became the principal language of the island, with the 2021 census recording English as the only language used at home for 85.8% of residents. The modern population of Lord Howe Island also includes mainland Australians of varied ancestral and migrant backgrounds, and a small number of residents use languages other than English at home, including Spanish, Portuguese, Fijian and Finnish. New Zealand uses English, Māori and New Zealand Sign Language, with numerous Pacific languages spoken by migrant communities. The Indigenous Moriori people of the Chatham Islands, east of mainland New Zealand, traditionally spoke the Moriori language, a distinct Polynesian language closely related to early southern Māori varieties. Centuries of geographical isolation contributed to its linguistic divergence from Māori, while colonisation severely disrupted its transmission. Revitalisation efforts are now underway among Moriori descendants.

American Samoa and Samoa use Samoan and English, with Samoan the principal Indigenous language. The Cook Islands use Cook Islands Māori and English, and Fiji has English, Fijian and Fiji Hindi as major languages, with Rotuman also spoken. French Polynesia uses French alongside Tahitian and other Marquesan, Tuamotuan and Austral Island Polynesian varieties. Kiribati uses Gilbertese (te taetae ni Kiribati) and English, while Nauru uses Nauruan and English. Kiribati and Nauru are the only countries or territories in the South Pacific which speak languages from the Micronesian language family, with the rest all being located in the North Pacific, although Kiribati straddles the equator, and consequently has islands in both the North and South Pacific. New Caledonia uses French and a large number of Kanak languages, including Drehu, Nengone, Paicî, Ajië and Xârâcùù while Niue uses Niuean and English. Norfolk Island is predominantly English-speaking but has a distinctive Norf'k language. The Pitcairn Islands similarly use English and the locally developed Pitkern language. Papua New Guinea, which occupies the eastern half of New Guinea, is one of the world's most linguistically diverse countries. Tok Pisin, English and Hiri Motu are major official languages along with more than 800 Indigenous languages, including numerous Trans–New Guinea languages, Sepik, Austronesian and other language groups. The Solomon Islands uses English officially but Solomon Islands Pijin is the principal lingua franca alongside numerous Indigenous languages. Tokelau uses Tokelauan and English; Tonga uses Tongan and English; Tuvalu uses Tuvaluan and English while Vanuatu has three official languages—English, French and Bislama—as well as more than 100 Indigenous Oceanic languages. Wallis and Futuna uses French alongside the Indigenous Polynesian languages Wallisian and Futunan. Indonesia's main language is Indonesian but it also contains hundreds of regional languages, including Javanese, Sundanese, Madurese, Balinese, Acehnese and the many languages of western New Guinea. Neighboring Timor-Leste uses Portuguese and Tetum, alongside Indonesian, English and numerous local languages including Mambai, Makasae and Fataluku.

==== Mainland Americas ====
Canada has English and French as its federal official languages and dozens of Indigenous languages, including Cree, Inuktitut, Ojibwe, Dene, Innu, Mi'kmaq, Blackfoot, Mohawk and Nisga'a. Chile and Colombia are predominantly Spanish-speaking but recognise or protect numerous Indigenous languages, including Mapudungun, Aymara, Rapa Nui, Quechua, Wayuu and Nasa Yuwe. Costa Rica, Ecuador, El Salvador, Guatemala, Honduras, Mexico, Nicaragua and Panama are predominantly Spanish-speaking but contain numerous Indigenous languages, particularly Mayan languages and Nahuatl in Mexico and Central America, and Kichwa, Shuar, Quechua and other Indigenous languages in Ecuador. Peru is predominantly Spanish-speaking but also officially recognises Indigenous languages in the areas where they predominate, especially Quechua, Aymara and numerous Amazonian languages. The United States uses English nationally in practice, with Spanish also widely spoken. It also has numerous Native American, Alaskan and Pacific languages, including Hawaiian and the other Indigenous languages in its Pacific territories. Native American languages from the mainland United States include Apache, Arapaho, Blackfoot, Cherokee, Cheyenne, Choctaw, Crow, Dakota, Hopi, Keres, Lakota, Navajo, Ojibwe, Shoshoni and Zuni.

== Geography ==
15 fully independent nations in the Pacific Rim have no land borders to other countries; Australia, Fiji, Japan, Kiribati, Nauru, New Zealand, Palau, Samoa, the Federated States of Micronesia, the Marshall Islands, the Philippines, the Solomon Islands, Tonga, Tuvalu, and Vanuatu. Aside from Samoa and Tonga, all of these nations are in the Eastern Hemisphere, with Fiji, Kiribati and New Zealand having land in both the Eastern and Western Hemispheres. Brunei, Indonesia, Papua New Guinea and Timor-Leste are considered divided island countries due to having land borders, while Singapore naturally has no land borders, but is connected to Malaysia through a man-made bridge and causeway. Taiwan also has no land borders but its sovereignty is disputed. Geographically, South Korea is a non-insular country located in mainland Asia, but geopolitically, it is often regarded as functionally being an island country. This is because South Korea only has a single, heavily restricted land border with North Korea, which effectively leaves it cut off from the rest of mainland Asia. Since the 1950s, the border between North and South Korea has had over 800,000 land mines placed, and as such just attempting to cross it is a potentially deadly threat.

By total land area, the smallest country in the Pacific Rim is Nauru, while the largest is Russia. The largest country which only borders Pacific waters is China. Some of the furthest cities from the Pacific Ocean which technically belong to Pacific Rim countries include the European Russian city of Kaliningrad, Ürümqi in western China (one of the most inland cities in the world), the U.S. city of Portland in the eastern state of Maine, and the Canadian city of St. John's in the eastern province of Newfoundland and Labrador.

Polar-adjacent lands in the Pacific Rim receive animal populations from the Antarctic and Arctic, including Australia's Macquarie Island in the far South Pacific, which has a large penguin population, and Alaska's St. Lawrence Island in the Bering Sea, which occasionally receives polar bears wandering from the north.

The International Hydrographic Organization defines the Southern Ocean as beginning at the 60°S latitude, with all of the ocean above that latitude still being part of the South Pacific. Under this boundary, the southernmost islands of the entire Pacific Basin are Macquarie Island at 54°63′S, and Chile's Diego Ramírez Islands at 56°29′S. Macquarie Island and the Diego Ramírez Islands are both at more southern latitudes than the southernmost point of mainland South America. The northernmost islands of the Pacific Basin are Alaska's Little Diomede Island at 65°45′N, and Russia's uninhabited Big Diomede Island at 65°46′N. The Diomedes are located in the Bering Strait, which is where Bering Sea waters and Chukchi Sea waters converge, with the Chukchi Sea being a marginal sea of the Arctic Ocean. If mainland Asia is included, then the northernmost area of the Pacific is Russia's uninhabited Naukan village, which is at 66°01′N and bordering the Bering Strait.

=== Gallery ===
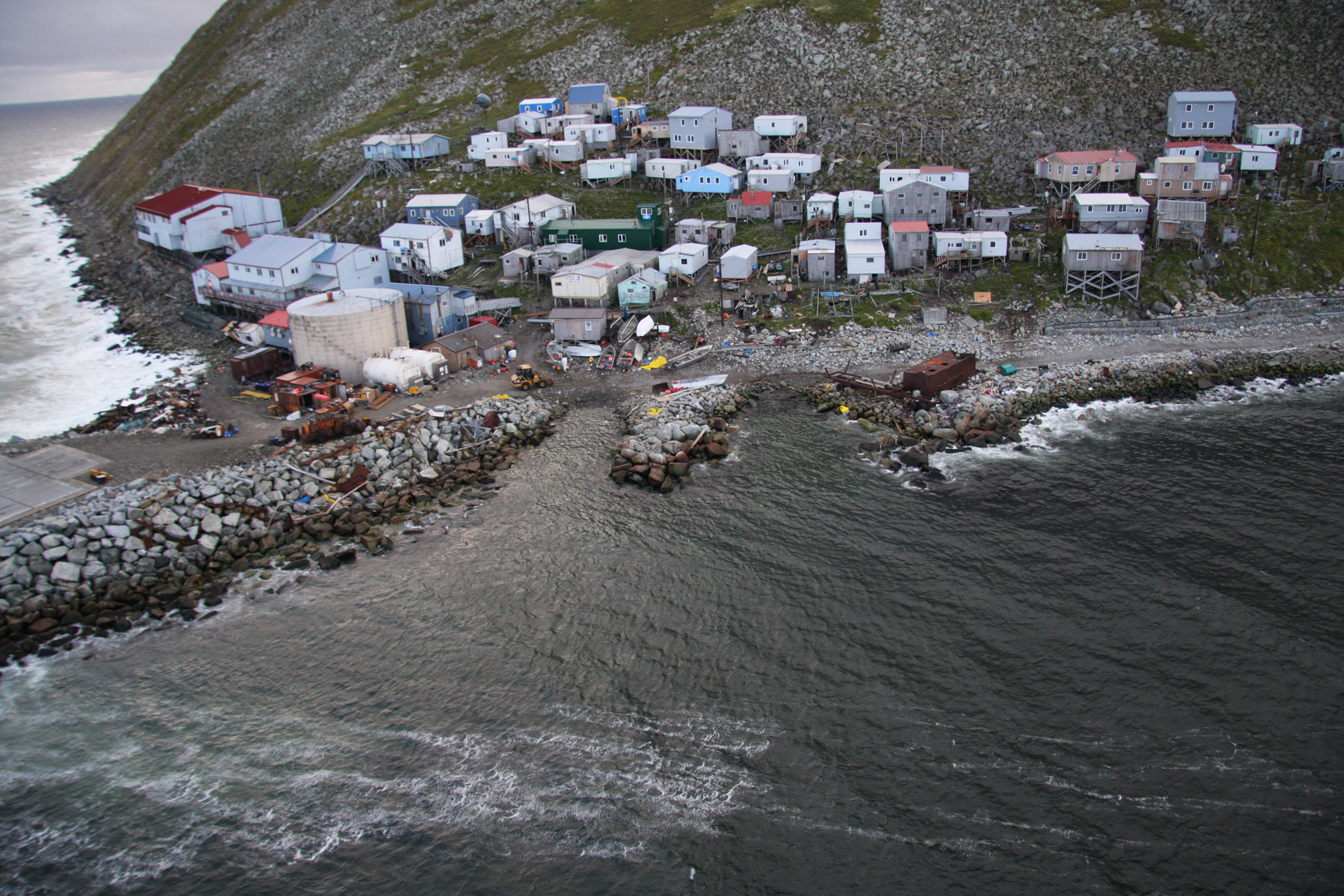
Alaska's Little Diomede Island, the second northernmost island in the Pacific Basin.

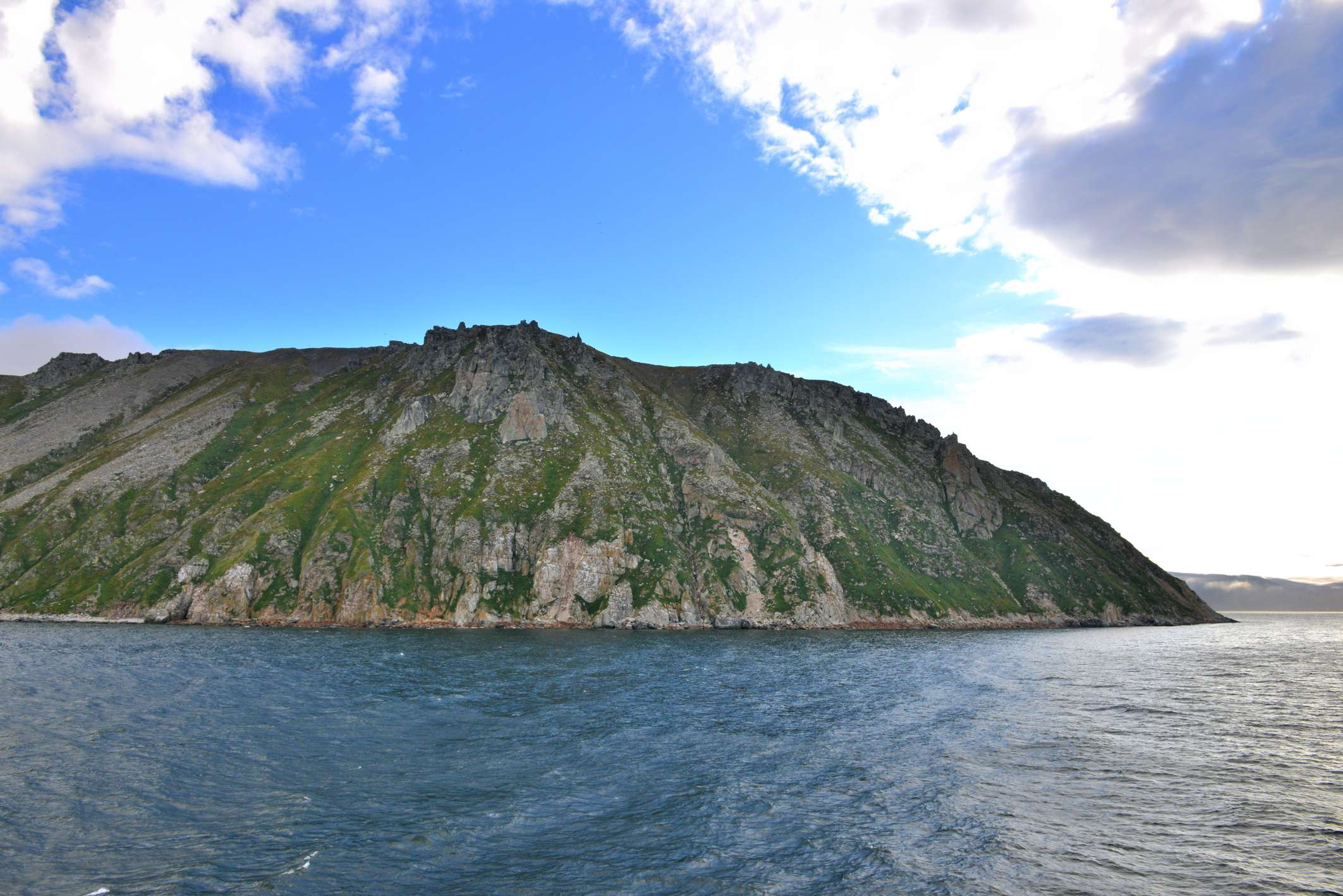
Russia's Big Diomede Island, the northernmost island in the Pacific Basin.

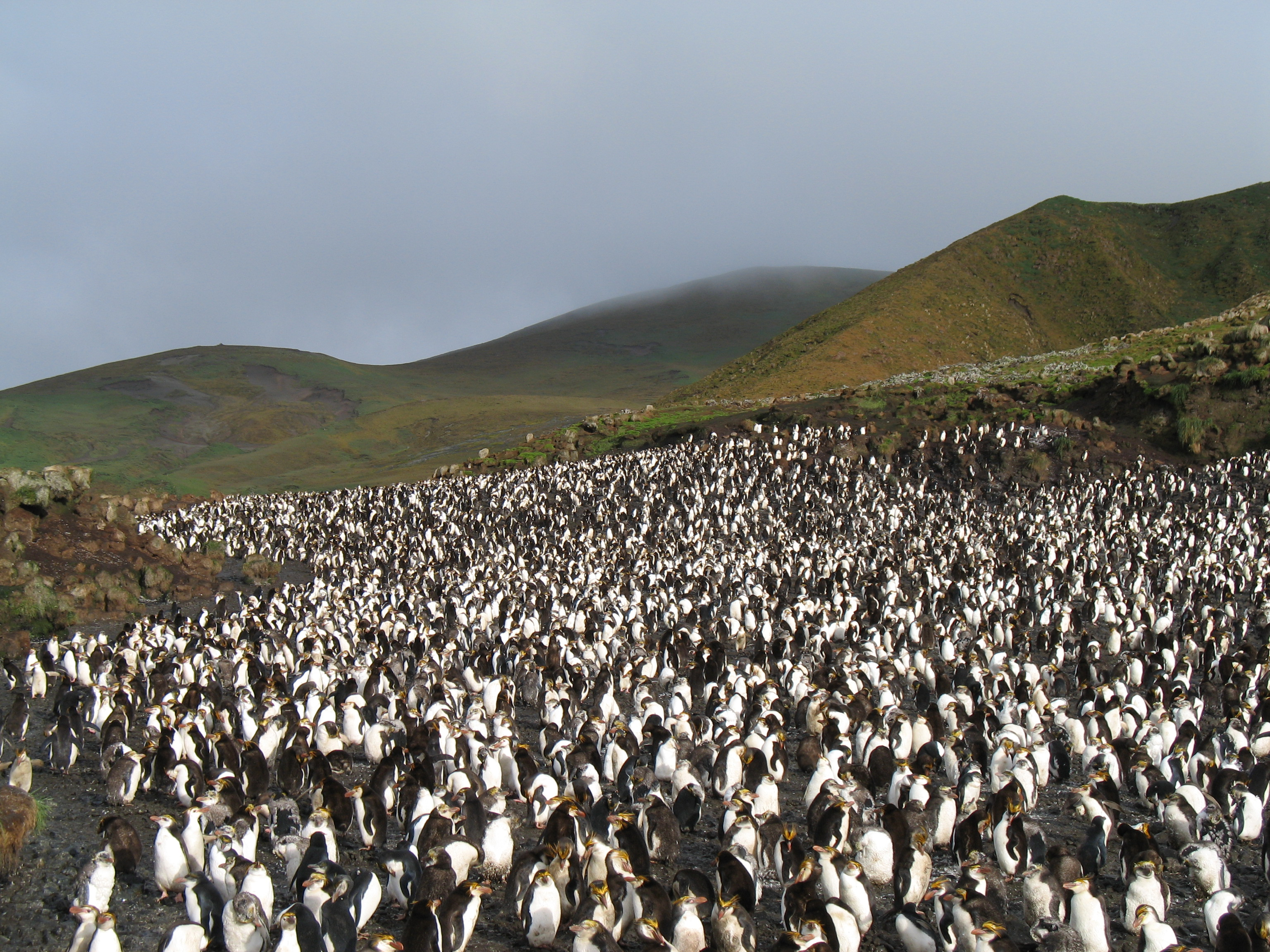
Australia's Macquarie Island, the second southernmost island group in the Pacific Basin.

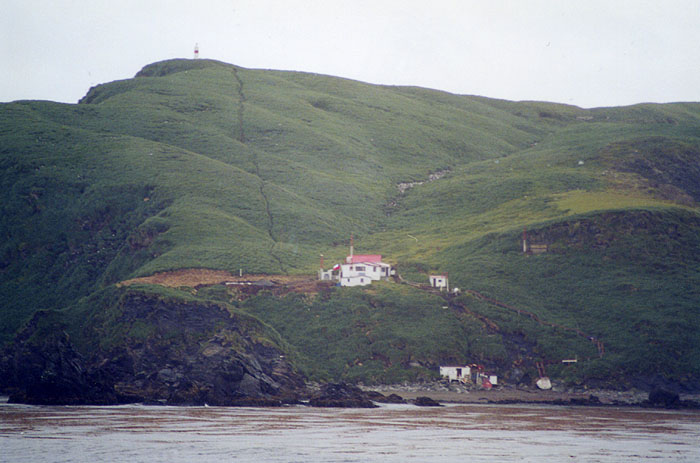
Isla Gonzalo of Chile's Diego Ramírez Islands, the southernmost island group in the Pacific Basin.

== Geology ==
The countries and territories of the Pacific Rim sit on several major tectonic plates and regional microplate boundary zones. The Pacific Plate contains Mexico's Baja California Peninsula, parts of Southern California such as Los Angeles and San Diego, American Samoa, the Cook Islands, French Polynesia, half of New Zealand, Kiribati, the Marshall Islands, Niue, Pitcairn Islands, Samoa, Tokelau, Tuvalu and Wallis and Futuna; the Australian Plate (part of the broader Indo-Australian Plate) contains Australia, half of New Zealand, New Caledonia, Norfolk Island, and Timor-Leste; the Eurasian Plate (including the Sunda, Amurian, and Yangtze continental blocks) contains Brunei, Cambodia, China, Hong Kong, Macau, Malaysia, North Korea, Singapore, South Korea, Thailand, and Vietnam; the North American Plate contains much of the continental United States, Mexico and Canada; the South American Plate contains Chile, Colombia, Ecuador, and Peru; the Caribbean Plate (alongside the adjacent Panama Microplate) contains Costa Rica, El Salvador, Honduras, Nicaragua, and Panama and the Philippine Sea Plate (including the Mariana Microplate) contains Guam, and Palau. Aside from New Zealand, Mexico and the United States, several other entities span active multi-plate boundary zones, including Fiji (Pacific and Indo-Australian plates with the North Fiji Microplate), Guatemala (North American and Caribbean plates), Indonesia (Sunda, Indo-Australian, Philippine Sea plates and regional microplates), Federated States of Micronesia (Pacific Plate, Philippine Sea Plate and Caroline Plate), Japan (Eurasian, North American/Okhotsk, Pacific and Philippine Sea plates), Northern Mariana Islands (Pacific Plate and Philippine Sea Plate with the Mariana Plate) Papua New Guinea (Indo-Australian and Pacific plates with regional microplates like Woodlark), the Philippines (Philippine Sea Plate and Sunda Plate boundary zone), Russia (Eurasian, North American and Amurian plates), the Solomon Islands (Pacific, Indo-Australian and Solomon Sea plates), Timor-Leste Taiwan (Eurasian and Philippine Sea plates), Tonga (Pacific Plate and Tonga Plate boundary) and Vanuatu (Indo-Australian Plate and New Hebrides Microplate boundary).

Among volcanic islands which are non-sovereign entities, Baker Island, Clipperton Island, Guadalupe Island, Hawaii, Howland Island, Jarvis Island, Johnston Atoll, Kingman Reef, Midway Atoll, Palmyra Atoll, the Revillagigedo Islands and Wake Island sit on the Pacific Plate; Cocos Island sits on the Cocos Plate as its only island; Malpelo Island sits on the Malpelo Plate (formerly classified as part of the Nazca Plate); the Desventuradas Islands, Easter Island, the Galápagos Islands, the Juan Fernández Islands, and Salas y Gómez sit on the Nazca Plate (adjacent to active regional structures like the Easter and Galápagos microplates); the Aleutian Islands sit on the arc boundary of the North American Plate overriding the subducting Pacific Plate; the Kuril Islands sit in the region where the Pacific plate subducts into the mantle beneath the Okhotsk Plate (a microplate historically linked to the North American Plate); the Bonin and Volcano Islands sit on the Philippine Sea Plate; the Ryukyu Islands sit on the Okinawa Plate (forming part of the overriding Eurasian Plate margin) and Macquarie Island sits on the boundary of the Indo-Australian and Pacific plates.

=== Strongest earthquakes recorded in the Pacific RIm ===
==== Strongest earthquakes recorded on the Pacific coasts of Asia and the Americas ====
Rank	Date	Location	Event	Magnitude
1	May 22, 1960	Valdivia, Chile	1960 Valdivia earthquake	9.4–9.6
2	March 27, 1964	Prince William Sound, Alaska, United States	1964 Alaska earthquake	9.2–9.3
3	November 4, 1952	Kamchatka, Russian SFSR, Soviet Union	1952 Severo-Kurilsk earthquake	8.8–9.0
4	February 27, 2010	Maule, Chile	2010 Chile earthquake	8.8
4	July 30, 2025	Kamchatka, Russia	2025 Kamchatka earthquake	8.8
4	January 31, 1906	Esmeraldas, Ecuador – Colombia	1906 Ecuador–Colombia earthquake	8.5–8.8
5	November 11, 1922	Atacama, Chile	1922 Vallenar earthquake	8.3–8.6

==== Strongest earthquakes recorded on insular regions in the Pacific ====
Rank	Date	Location	Event	Magnitude
1	December 26, 2004	Sumatra, Indonesia	2004 Indian Ocean earthquake	9.2–9.3
2	March 11, 2011	Pacific Ocean, Tōhoku region, Japan	2011 Tōhoku earthquake	9.0–9.1
3	February 3, 1965	Rat Islands, Aleutian Islands, Alaska, United States	1965 Rat Islands earthquake	8.7
4	April 1, 1946	Aleutian Islands, Alaska, United States	1946 Aleutian Islands earthquake	8.6
4	March 9, 1957	Andreanof Islands, Aleutian Islands, Alaska, United States	1957 Andreanof Islands earthquake	8.6
4	March 28, 2005	Sumatra, Indonesia	2005 Nias–Simeulue earthquake	8.6
4	April 11, 2012	Sumatra, Indonesia	2012 Indian Ocean earthquakes	8.6
5	February 1, 1938	Banda Sea, Indonesia (then part of the Dutch East Indies)	1938 Banda Sea earthquake	8.5–8.6
6	October 13, 1963	Kuril Islands, Russian SFSR, Soviet Union	1963 Kuril Islands earthquake	8.5
7	March 2, 1933	Iwate Prefecture, Japan	1933 Sanriku earthquake	8.4–8.5
7	September 12, 2007	Bengkulu Province, Indonesia	2007 Bengkulu earthquakes	8.4–8.5

== Economy and business ==
The economies of East Asia are among the most industrialized and internationally integrated economies in the Pacific Rim. Taiwan and South Korea are major centers of semiconductor manufacturing, while Japan and China have large automotive, machinery, and electronics industries, as well as other manufacturing industries. Hong Kong is an international financial and commercial center. Macau's economy is heavily dependent on tourism and gaming. North Korea has a substantially different economic structure from other Asian countries. Its economy remains dominated by state ownership and central planning, with mining, agriculture, and military-related production occupying important roles. In recent years, North Korea has sought to build a tourism industry, as highlighted by the 2025 opening of the Wonsan-Kalma Coastal Tourist Zone, a sprawling multi-billion-dollar beach resort located on the country's eastern coast in Wonsan.

Australia, Canada, and the Russian Far East are sparsely populated areas and have economies in which natural resources play a significant role. Australia is a major exporter of iron ore, coal, natural gas, and other minerals. The country also has a mature tourism industry, primarily centered around the three east coast states of New South Wales, Queensland and Victoria. Canada has substantial energy, mining, forestry, and agricultural industries. The Russian Far East has economies centered on oil and gas, coal, fisheries, timber, and mineral resources. Russia's Sakhalin possesses substantial reserves of oil, natural gas, coal, and other mineral resources, as well as important fisheries and forest resources. The geographic proximity of Sakhalin to Japan has historically made its oil and gas resources particularly significant to Japanese energy security. The Sakhalin-1 and Sakhalin-2 projects were developed partly with Japanese participation and became sources of crude oil and LNG for the Japanese market. Australia's proximity to Japan relative to many other resource-producing regions also makes it an important component of Japan's energy supply network.

Southeast Asia contains a diverse group of manufacturing, resource, and service economies. Indonesia, Malaysia, the Philippines, Thailand, and Vietnam have developed significant manufacturing industries, including electronics, automotive production, textiles, and other export-oriented industries. Singapore is a major center for finance, shipping, logistics, and advanced manufacturing, while Brunei and Timor-Leste remain more dependent on petroleum revenues. Cambodia has developed a large garment and footwear industry. Tourism is another important part of several Southeast Asian economies. Indonesia, Malaysia, Thailand, Singapore and Vietnam in particular receive large numbers of international visitors, with destinations such as Bali and Bangkok supporting extensive tourism industries.

Mexico is the largest Latin American Pacific Rim economy, and has a sizeable manufacturing sector and is a major producer of automobiles, electronics, machinery, and other manufactured goods. Chile and Peru are major producers of copper and other minerals, while agriculture, including coffee cultivation, remains important in several Central American economies. Panama occupies a distinctive position because of the Panama Canal, which provides a major maritime link between the Atlantic and Pacific oceans. A large share of canal traffic involves trade between the east coast of the United States and East Asia, making the canal an important part of Pacific trade networks as well as the Panamanian economy. Tourism is significant across much of the Pacific coast of Latin America. Costa Rica has developed a substantial ecotourism industry and Ecuador's Galápagos Islands are an internationally recognized tourism destination, subject to extensive environmental regulation. Chile's Easter Island is another Latin American destination closely associated with tourism and cultural heritage, along with Peru's Machu Picchu. Mexico's Acapulco on the Pacific coast was historically a prominent tourist destination, but its popularity has declined since the 2010s, due to rising gang violence.

The United States has traditionally been the largest economy on the Pacific Rim and contains major economic centers along its Pacific coast, including Los Angeles, the San Francisco Bay Area, San Diego, Seattle and Portland, Oregon. These centers are important in technology, finance, manufacturing, higher education, shipping, and entertainment and maintain extensive commercial links with East Asia and other Pacific economies. The Hollywood film and television industry forms part of a wider Pacific Rim production network, with animation work often undertaken in Taiwan, the Philippines or South Korea (such as for The Simpsons, which has been animated in Seoul since the late 1980s). Substantial filming and post-production activity occurs in Vancouver and other Pacific Rim cities, with Vancouver providing generous tax breaks to Hollywood productions. There have also been notable cases in which Pacific Rim companies acquired major American entertainment businesses, including Australia-based News Corporation acquiring 20th Century Fox in 1985, Japan's Sony acquiring Columbia Pictures in 1989, and Japan's Matsushita Electric Industrial acquiring MCA Inc., the owner of Universal Pictures, in 1990. Matsushita subsequently sold most of its stake in MCA to Canadian company Seagram in 1995.

The economies of Melanesia, Micronesia and Polynesia vary considerably in size and structure but commonly have small domestic markets and limited export bases. Fiji, French Polynesia, Guam, Hawaii, Samoa and other island economies receive substantial income from international tourism. Fisheries and development assistance are important sources of income in small Melanesian and Micronesian islands, which generally have less developed tourism industries than those in Polynesia. Among larger Melanesian islands, New Caledonia has a significant nickel industry, while Papua New Guinea has major mineral and liquefied natural gas exports. Along with Fiji, New Caledonia has the most developed tourism sector in Melanesia, although it's more heavily reliant on attracting tourists from Australia, and is vulnerable to changes in Australian tourism habits. New Zealand's export economy includes dairy products, meat, forestry products, and other agricultural commodities. Nauru, which was under Australian administration beginning in 1914, had one of the highest GDP per capitas in the world after gaining independence in 1968, due to its phosphate industry. It eventually suffered a major economic downturn in the 1980s, due to a decline in its phosphate and misguided financial decisions. Before the economic downturn, Nauru was earning 70 times more than its island neighbors were. During this time, Nauru's government spent money on a London West End musical and lost over a billion dollars on lavish property development projects in Australia, Hawaii and the Philippines. The Nauru House in Melbourne was briefly the city's tallest building, and had to be sold by the government of Nauru to pay off debts. In 2024, Nauru had the second lowest GDP in the world. Since 2001, it has received income from Australia by hosting detained asylum seekers, in addition to receiving large amounts of aid from Australia. The Nauru detention center program was briefly suspended in 2007, following the election of less conservative leadership in Australia. In March 2008, talks began between Australia and Nauru regarding the future of the former's economic development aid to the latter. Nauruan Foreign and Finance Minister Dr Kieren Keke stated that his country did not want aid handouts. One possible solution explored was for Australia to assist Nauru in setting up a "boat repair industry" for regional fishing vessels.

Aside from Nauru, other countries in Micronesia also have some of the world's lowest GDPs, including the Federated States of Micronesia, Kiribati, the Marshall Islands and Palau. Since becoming independent countries, the Federated States of Micronesia, the Marshall Islands and Palau have had financial stability from a Compact of Free Association with the United States. In exchange for benefits such as developmental assistance, this Compact of Free Association allows the United States strategic military access to the islands. Kiribati is not part of the Compact of Free Association with the United States, and has historically relied on aid from Australia, who between 2008 and 2024 accounted for roughly 31% of all external development support to Kiribati. The next two largest donors for Kiribati were New Zealand (16%) and Japan (11%).

=== Nominal GDP of Pacific Rim nations ===
Nominal GDP by country (2024)
Rank	Country / Territory	GDP (Nominal, USD)
1	United States	$30.77 trillion
2	China	$19.50 trillion
3	Japan	$4.44 trillion
4	Russia	$2.56 trillion
5	Canada	$2.32 trillion
6	South Korea	$1.87 trillion
7	Mexico	$1.83 trillion
8	Australia	$1.80 trillion
9	Indonesia	$1.45 trillion
10	Taiwan	$801.05 billion
11	Singapore	$603.87 billion
12	Thailand	$577.01 billion
13	Vietnam	$514.70 billion
14	Philippines	$487.09 billion
15	Malaysia	$472.19 billion
16	Colombia	$457.41 billion
17	Hong Kong	$427.31 billion
18	Chile	$357.37 billion
19	Peru	$334.86 billion
20	New Zealand	$264.06 billion
21	Ecuador	$130.32 billion
22	Guatemala	$123.31 billion
23	Costa Rica	$102.91 billion
24	Panama	$90.46 billion
25	Macau	$52.06 billion
26	Cambodia	$51.27 billion
27	Honduras	$39.60 billion
28	El Salvador	$36.71 billion
29	Papua New Guinea	$32.50 billion
30	Nicaragua	$22.24 billion
31	North Korea	$16.45 billion
32	Brunei	$15.03 billion
33	New Caledonia	$8.55 billion
34	French Polynesia	$6.32 billion
35	Fiji	$6.20 billion
36	Timor-Leste	$1.90 billion
37	Solomon Islands	$1.75 billion
38	Vanuatu	$1.35 billion
39	Samoa	$1.29 billion
40	Tonga	$679 million
41	Federated States of Micronesia	$502 million
42	Cook Islands	$366 million
43	Kiribati	$349 million
44	Palau	$345 million
45	Marshall Islands	$308 million
46	Nauru	$176 million
47	Tuvalu	$57 million

=== Currency ===
The Pacific Rim has a diverse currency landscape, with most states issuing their own national currencies. There are also several countries and territories using, sharing, or pegging their currencies to those of larger economies. In North America, Canada uses the Canadian dollar, the United States uses the United States dollar and Mexico the Mexican peso. The Central American states of Costa Rica, Guatemala, Honduras and Nicaragua use the Costa Rican colón, Guatemalan quetzal, Honduran lempira and Nicaraguan córdoba respectively, while El Salvador uses the United States dollar as legal tender alongside its historically retained Salvadoran colón. Panama is another special case, using the balboa together with US dollar notes, with the balboa maintained at parity with the US dollar. In South America, Chile uses the Chilean peso, Colombia the Colombian peso, Peru the Peruvian sol, while Ecuador uses the United States dollar as its official currency; this also applies to the Galápagos Islands, which are their own distinct political province of Ecuador. Similarly, Easter Island uses the Chilean peso because it is part of Chile, rather than having a separate currency. In East Asia, China uses the renminbi (yuan), Japan the Japanese yen, South Korea the South Korean won, North Korea the North Korean won, and Taiwan the New Taiwan dollar. Hong Kong, although part of China, retains the Hong Kong dollar, which operates under a Linked Exchange Rate System pegged to the US dollar, while Macau uses the Macanese pataca, which is in turn linked closely to the Hong Kong dollar. Russia uses the Russian ruble, while Southeast Asia has a particularly varied collection of currencies; Brunei uses the Brunei dollar, Cambodia the Cambodian riel with the US dollar also extensively used in the economy, Indonesia the Indonesian rupiah, Malaysia the Malaysian ringgit, the Philippines the Philippine peso, Singapore the Singapore dollar, Thailand the Thai baht, and Vietnam the Vietnamese đồng. Brunei is notable for its Currency Interchangeability Agreement with Singapore, under which Brunei and Singapore currencies are accepted and exchanged at par by their respective monetary authorities and banks, although each country retains its own currency.

In the Pacific, Australia uses the Australian dollar, which is also the official currency of Kiribati, Nauru and Tuvalu. New Zealand uses the New Zealand dollar, which is also an official currency of the semi-independent Polynesian states the Cook Islands, Niue and Tokelau, all of which are politically associated with New Zealand. The Pitcairn Islands also use the New Zealand dollar, despite being a British Overseas Territory. Among other countries in the Pacific Ocean, Fiji uses the Fijian dollar, Samoa uses the Samoan tālā, the Solomon Islands use the Solomon Islands dollar, Tonga the Tongan paʻanga, Vanuatu the Vanuatu vatu, and Papua New Guinea the Papua New Guinean kina. Norfolk Island, an Australian external territory, uses the Australian dollar. Several Pacific island states associated with the United States use the United States dollar rather than their own currencies. These include the independent nations of the Marshall Islands, the Federated States of Micronesia, Palau, and the U.S. overseas territories of American Samoa, Guam and the Northern Mariana Islands. Timor-Leste uses it independently of the United States; the Central Bank of Timor-Leste states that the US dollar is its official currency and legal tender, with national centavo coins issued as subdivisions of the dollar. French Polynesia, New Caledonia and Wallis and Futuna form another shared currency area, using the CFP franc, issued by the Institut d'émission d'outre-mer and serving as legal tender in all three of these French Pacific territories. Clipperton Island is under the direct authority of the French Government, and if it had a human population, then it would theoretically use a French currency. From 1936 to 2007, it was administratively attached to French Oceania (later renamed French Polynesia), before the French government placed Clipperton under direct administration.

=== Consumer trends ===
==== Cosmetic procedures ====
Several countries in the Pacific Rim feature prominently in international rankings of cosmetic procedures. 2021 estimates from the International Society of Aesthetic Plastic Surgery (ISAPS) placed South Korea first worldwide for cosmetic procedures, with approximately 8.90 procedures per 1,000 inhabitants, narrowly ahead of Argentina at 8.81. Other Pacific-facing countries in the top ten included Colombia, in fourth place at 7.26 procedures per 1,000 inhabitants; the United States, in sixth place at 5.91 and Mexico, in ninth place at 5.31. Cosmetic surgery preferences vary by country. South Korea is particularly associated with eyelid surgery, although available clinical research does not establish national procedure rates. According to 2024 data from ISAPS, liposuction was the most common surgical procedure in Chile, Colombia, Mexico and the United States, eyelid surgery in Japan, Malaysia, the Philippines, Taiwan, Thailand and Vietnam and breast augmentation in Australia.

A 2018 ISAPS global survey placed Australia, Colombia, Mexico, Thailand and the United States as among the top ten countries for total number of cosmetic procedures, but data from South Korea was not included. In 2023, the United States recorded the highest number of combined surgical and non-surgical cosmetic procedures worldwide, with 1,791,102 surgical procedures being performed, alongside 4,405,599 non-surgical procedures, for a total of 6,196,701. The United States ranked first in this category again in 2024, and other reported Pacific Rim countries in the top 20 that year included Australia, Colombia, Japan, Mexico, Taiwan and Thailand. Like with the United States that year, Japan and Taiwan recorded more non-surgical procedures than surgical procedures, while Australia, Colombia, Mexico and Thailand recorded more surgical procedures than non-surgical procedures. Among reported Pacific Rim locations in 2018, the non-surgical botulinum toxin procedure was most performed in the United States (1,463,409), Mexico (289,568), Colombia (66,351), Australia (41,077) and Thailand (20,561). Japan and Taiwan were not included in the 2018 data, but Taiwan had higher rates of botulinum toxin usage than the United States in the 2024 data. In the 2018 data, the United States had the highest rate of botulinum toxin usage at 8.7%, while Australia ranked second at 4.1%, as the country only had a total population of 25 million in 2018. In 2008, Australia was reported to have surpassed the United States in terms of per capita spend on cosmetic procedures, with the country spending $300 million on procedures that year. In 2018, Australia's annual spending for cosmetic procedures reached $1 billion, which was 40% more per capita than the United States, and in 2025 one in five Australian women were estimated to have had a cosmetic procedure throughout their life.

==== Coffee consumption ====
Coffee consumption varies considerably across the Pacific Rim. According to international coffee consumption data from 2025, Canada ranked eleventh among the countries surveyed for estimated lifetime coffee consumption, at approximately 34,956 cups per person. Its estimated daily consumption was 1.57 cups per capita, equivalent to approximately 6.08 kilograms of coffee per person annually. Among other Pacific Rim countries, the corresponding estimates were 1.22 cups per day in the United States, 1.14 in Australia, 0.93 in Japan and 0.74 in South Korea. The data also reported lower estimates for Taiwan (0.46 cups per day), the Philippines (0.43) and Vietnam (0.42).

Canada's relatively high consumption is comparable to that of several Nordic countries. The same data recorded even higher daily consumption in Finland, at 3.77 cups per person, followed by Sweden at 2.59 and Norway at 2.57. The high coffee consumption in Canada and the Nordic countries is considered to reflect the colder climates in these far northern countries.

The coffeehouse chain Starbucks was founded in Seattle in 1971, initially selling roasted coffee beans, tea and spices before expanding into prepared coffee beverages and espresso-based drinks. Vancouver was Starbucks' first expansion outside Seattle and the United States itself, with a store opening on March 1, 1987 at the SeaBus Terminal. Starbucks began its international expansion across the Pacific in 1996, opening its first store outside North America in Ginza, Tokyo, Japan, on August 2 of that year. The company subsequently entered the Philippines in 1997 and Malaysia, New Zealand, Taiwan and Thailand in 1998, followed by mainland China in 1999. Its expansion into Latin America began in Mexico in 2002 through a partnership with Alsea, and the region subsequently became an important part of its international operations, reflecting both the area's urban consumer markets and its significance in global coffee production.

Starbucks' expansion was less successful in Australia, where it opened its first store in Sydney in July 2000. The company expanded rapidly but struggled to establish itself in a market with an established café culture and strong independent competition, particularly from cafés serving espresso-based drinks. In July 2008, Starbucks announced the closure of 61 of its 85 Australian stores, leaving a smaller operation concentrated in Sydney, Melbourne and Brisbane.

=== Media industry ===
The Pacific Rim contains highly developed media markets, such as those of the United States, Australia, Canada, China, Japan, New Zealand and South Korea, with major broadcasters including ABC, CBS, NBC, Fox and PBS in the United States; China Media Group, including CCTV, in China; NHK, Nippon TV, TV Asahi, TBS and Fuji TV in Japan; CBC/Radio-Canada, CTV and Global in Canada; KBS, MBC and SBS in South Korea; the ABC, SBS, Seven, Nine, 10 and Sky News Australia in Australia; and TVNZ, Three, Māori Television and RNZ in New Zealand. Among these countries, major newspapers include the Los Angeles Times, The New York Times, the San Francisco Chronicle, The Seattle Times, The Wall Street Journal and The Washington Post in the United States; People's Daily, China Daily and Global Times in China; Yomiuri Shimbun, Asahi Shimbun and Nikkei in Japan; The Globe and Mail, National Post and Vancouver Sun in Canada; Chosun Ilbo, JoongAng Ilbo and Dong-A Ilbo in South Korea; The Australian, The Daily Telegraph, The Sydney Morning Herald, The Age and Australian Financial Review in Australia; and The New Zealand Herald, The Press and The Post in New Zealand. Other major Pacific Rim markets include Indonesia, with networks such as RCTI, SCTV and Trans TV and newspapers such as Kompas; the Philippines, with GMA Network, TV5 and ABS-CBN alongside the Philippine Daily Inquirer and The Philippine Star; Malaysia, with RTM, TV3 and Astro alongside New Straits Times and The Star; and Thailand, with Thai PBS, Channel 3 and Channel 7 alongside Thai Rath and the Bangkok Post.

In Latin America, Chile developed networks including Chilevisión, Canal 13, Mega and Televisión Nacional de Chile. Mexico likewise developed a major television and media industry, led by networks such as Imagen Televisión, Televisa and TV Azteca. Chile's major newspapers include Diario Financiero, El Mercurio, La Tercera and Las Últimas Noticias, while Mexico's include El Universal, Excélsior, Milenio, Reforma and La Jornada. Peru has a major television industry led by América Televisión, Latina Televisión and ATV, while its principal newspapers include El Comercio and La República. Ecuador's main broadcasters include Ecuavisa, Teleamazonas and TC Televisión, with major newspapers including El Universo, El Comercio and Expreso. Among the countries of Central America, Guatemala has major broadcasters including Canal 3, Canal 7 and Guatevisión, alongside newspapers such as Prensa Libre and Nuestro Diario. Honduras is served by Canal 5, HCH and other national broadcasters, while major newspapers include La Prensa, El Heraldo and La Tribuna. In El Salvador, major television networks include TCS, Canal 12, Canal 10 and Canal 21, while leading newspapers include La Prensa Gráfica, El Diario de Hoy and El Mundo. Nicaragua has major television channels including Canal 2, Canal 4, Canal 8 and Canal 13, while La Prensa and Confidencial have been among its best-known newspapers and independent news organisations. Costa Rica is dominated by broadcasters such as Teletica and Repretel, with major newspapers and news outlets including La Nación, La Teja, Diario Extra and CRHoy.com. In Panama, leading broadcasters include Telemetro, TVN and SERTV, while major newspapers include La Prensa, Panamá América, La Estrella de Panamá and El Siglo.

Russia has a large national television industry dominated by Channel One, Russia-1 and NTV, alongside other major networks including Russia-24, RT, REN TV, STS and TNT. Major newspapers include Rossiyskaya Gazeta, Kommersant, Izvestia, Komsomolskaya Pravda, Moskovsky Komsomolets and Vedomosti. Russia's Pacific-facing regions also have their own regional media. In Primorsky Krai, centred on Vladivostok, major outlets include OTV-Prim (Общественное телевидение Приморья), regional VGTRK services and newspapers such as Vladivostok, Dalnevostochnye Vedomosti and the government-published Primorskaya Gazeta. From 2006 to 2011, an English-language paper called the Vladivostok Times also existed. In Khabarovsk, important regional broadcasters include Gubernia TV and 6TV, alongside the VGTRK regional service. Sakhalin Oblast is served by regional television and radio operated through VGTRK and local broadcasters, while Sovetsky Sakhalin is the principal long-running regional newspaper, distributed across Sakhalin and the Kuril Islands. Kamchatka Krai has the VGTRK-affiliated Kamchatka TV and regional newspapers including Vesti and Nasha Kamchatka.

In the Pacific Rim, media ownership is often concentrated within large conglomerates, with significant cross-ownership between television, newspapers, radio and digital platforms. In Japan, major newspaper groups are closely associated with television networks, including Yomiuri–Nippon TV, Asahi–TV Asahi, Mainichi–TBS, Sankei–Fuji TV and Nikkei–TV Tokyo. In Malaysia, Media Prima operates TV3, 8TV, NTV7 and TV9, as well as the New Straits Times, Berita Harian and Harian Metro newspaper groups. In Australia, Nine operates the Nine television network and publishes The Sydney Morning Herald, The Age and Australian Financial Review. In Hong Kong, the South China Morning Post is owned by Alibaba Group, a multinational technology company. The Russian media system is heavily concentrated among state-owned or state-linked broadcasters and major private conglomerates; Channel One is majority state-controlled, Russia-1 is operated by the state-owned VGTRK, and NTV is owned by Gazprom-Media.

Rupert Murdoch, an Australian-born media proprietor, played a major role in the development of the U.S. television industry. His company News Corporation acquired the Metromedia television stations in 1985, and the Fox Broadcasting Company was launched in 1986, with the stations forming its initial network base. Fox was the first major network formed in the United States in several decades, and was named after the 20th Century Fox Hollywood film studio, which News Corporation had also recently acquired. Murdoch became a U.S. citizen in September 1985 in order to comply with U.S. restrictions on foreign ownership of broadcast licences; at the time, foreign ownership of such licences was restricted by the Federal Communications Commission. Contemporary FCC records subsequently described Murdoch as having de facto and de jure control of Fox. Murdoch and News Corporation went on to launch the Fox News network in 1996, with this network becoming influential in the conservative U.S. political landscape. News Corporation has major newspaper holdings in both Australia and the United States, including The Australian, The Daily Telegraph, Herald Sun, The Wall Street Journal and the New York Post; it also owns Papua New Guinea's Post-Courier.

In smaller Pacific island countries such as Fiji, the Solomon Islands, Vanuatu, Samoa, Tonga, Kiribati, Palau, the Marshall Islands, Nauru and Tuvalu, media markets are considerably less developed and radio has often been more important than television or print. National broadcasters and a small number of newspapers serve most domestic audiences, while Australia, New Zealand and other regional broadcasters provide substantial imported programming and news content. Among these states, Fiji has one of the region's most developed media industries, with television broadcasters including FBC TV, Fiji One and Mai TV, and major newspapers including The Fiji Times and Fiji Sun. In the Solomon Islands, the Solomon Islands Broadcasting Corporation (SIBC) is the principal national broadcaster, providing radio and television news online, while Solomon Star and Island Sun are the country's two main newspapers. Vanuatu is served by the state-owned VBTC and its Television Blong Vanuatu (TBV), while Vanuatu Daily Post is the country's main independent newspaper. Samoa has several digital television services, including TV1, TV3 and the government-operated TV9, while Samoa Observer is its principal commercial newspaper. In Tonga, the state-owned Tonga Broadcasting Commission operates Television Tonga and Radio Tonga, while Matangi Tonga is a major online news organisation; Tonga's print newspaper industry has largely disappeared. Kiribati has no national television service, with Radio Kiribati serving as the principal broadcaster and Te Uekera and Kiribati Newstar among its main newspapers. Palau has a small television sector including Oceania Television Network and OTV, alongside the newspapers Island Times and Tia Belau. In the Marshall Islands, television services include MBC-TV, while Marshall Islands Journal is the country's only print newspaper. Nauru has Nauru Television, operated through the Nauru Media Bureau, and the government publishes the Naoero Bulletin; Australian and Fijian television services are also widely available. Tuvalu has Radio Tuvalu and the state-operated Tuvalu.TV service, while Tuvalu Echoes has historically been the country's principal newspaper. In the U.S. state of Hawaii, major television news outlets include Hawaii News Now, operated through KHNL and KGMB, as well as KHON-TV and KITV. Its principal newspapers include Honolulu Star-Advertiser, The Maui News, Hawaii Tribune-Herald, West Hawaii Today and The Garden Island.

In smaller Pacific islands, the high cost of transmitters, imported equipment and national distribution networks, combined with small populations and geographic isolation, heavily delayed the development of television services. Fiji, for example, began experimental television broadcasting in 1991 and regular service in 1994. In the Galápagos Islands, television broadcasting began in 1980 with Tele Galápagos in Puerto Baquerizo Moreno, around two decades after commercial television had begun on mainland Ecuador; it initially had only a low-power transmitter and limited local coverage. On Easter Island, Televisión Nacional de Chile established a television station at Hanga Roa on January 24, 1975. Initially, programmes were prerecorded on the Chilean mainland and transported to the island, while live satellite transmission from Santiago began in 1996; additional terrestrial networks were introduced later.

== Standard of living ==
=== Life expectancy ===
Life expectancy in the Pacific Rim is highest among developed countries such as Australia, New Zealand, Canada, Hong Kong, Japan, South Korea and Singapore, reflecting higher incomes, healthcare access and living standards. In contrast, the lowest life expectancies are concentrated among poorer Pacific island countries and several developing countries in Southeast Asia, with particularly low figures in places such as Nauru, Papua New Guinea, the Federated States of Micronesia and Kiribati. Pacific islands which are overseas territories of countries (like French Polynesia) generally have much higher life expectancies than Pacific islands which are their own independent countries.

Life expectancy by country / territory (2025)
Rank	Country / Territory	Combined life expectancy	Life expectancy, males	Life expectancy, females
1	Hong Kong	85.5 years	82.7 years	88.2 years
2	French Polynesia	84.3 years	81.9 years	86.6 years
3	Japan	84.1 years	81.1 years	87.1 years
4	South Korea	83.7 years	80.8 years	86.6 years
5	Singapore	83.4 years	81.2 years	85.6 years
6	Macau	83.4 years	80.6 years	86.2 years
7	Australia	83.1 years	81.1 years	85.1 years
8	Canada	82.2 years	80.0 years	84.3 years
9	New Zealand	82.1 years	80.4 years	83.7 years
10	Chile	81.4 years	79.5 years	83.2 years
11	Costa Rica	81.0 years	78.4 years	83.6 years
12	Taiwan	80.8 years	77.7 years	84.0 years
13	Panama	79.8 years	76.9 years	82.7 years
14	Northern Mariana Islands	79.1 years	77.3 years	80.9 years
15	United States	79.0 years	76.5 years	81.4 years
16	New Caledonia	79.0 years	76.5 years	81.4 years
17	Wallis and Futuna	78.9 years	77.9 years	79.9 years
18	China	78.1 years	75.2 years	81.0 years
19	Peru	78.0 years	75.6 years	80.3 years
20	Colombia	77.9 years	75.2 years	80.6 years
21	Guam	77.7 years	73.7 years	81.6 years
22	Ecuador	77.6 years	74.9 years	80.3 years
23	Tokelau	77.3 years	75.2 years	79.2 years
24	Malaysia	77.0 years	74.4 years	79.5 years
25	Thailand	76.7 years	72.3 years	81.0 years
26	Cook Islands	75.7 years	72.4 years	79.5 years
27	Brunei	75.6 years	73.5 years	77.7 years
28	Mexico	75.2 years	72.4 years	78.0 years
29	Nicaragua	75.1 years	72.5 years	77.6 years
30	Vietnam	74.8 years	70.1 years	79.4 years
31	North Korea	73.8 years	71.6 years	75.9 years
32	Russia	73.6 years	68.3 years	78.9 years
33	American Samoa	73.2 years	70.3 years	76.0 years
34	Honduras	73.1 years	70.5 years	75.7 years
35	Tonga	73.0 years	69.5 years	76.5 years
36	Guatemala	72.7 years	70.4 years	75.0 years
37	El Salvador	72.2 years	67.8 years	76.5 years
38	Samoa	71.9 years	70.0 years	73.8 years
39	Vanuatu	71.9 years	69.6 years	74.1 years
40	Indonesia	71.3 years	69.2 years	73.4 years
41	Solomon Islands	70.8 years	69.4 years	72.2 years
42	Cambodia	70.8 years	68.1 years	73.4 years
43	Niue	70.2 years	67.6 years	73.0 years
44	Philippines	70.0 years	67.0 years	73.0 years
45	Palau	69.6 years	67.3 years	71.9 years
46	Timor-Leste	68.0 years	66.3 years	69.7 years
47	Fiji	67.5 years	65.5 years	69.5 years
48	Federated States of Micronesia	67.5 years	63.6 years	71.3 years
49	Tuvalu	67.4 years	63.9 years	70.9 years
50	Marshall Islands	67.3 years	65.0 years	69.5 years
51	Kiribati	66.5 years	64.7 years	68.3 years
52	Papua New Guinea	66.5 years	63.8 years	69.2 years
53	Nauru	62.3 years	60.4 years	64.2 years

== Sports ==
Sport is an important part of social and cultural life throughout the Pacific Rim, although no single sport dominates the entire region. Association football (soccer) is particularly prominent across Latin America, much of Southeast Asia and several Pacific island states, while sports such as rugby union, rugby league, Australian rules football, cricket, baseball and basketball have strong regional concentrations.

In Australia, Australian rules football and rugby league are the principal football codes, with their strongest traditional support divided geographically by the Barassi Line; Australian rules is particularly prominent in Victoria, South Australia, Western Australia, Tasmania and the Northern Territory, while rugby league is strongest in New South Wales and Queensland. Cricket, association football and other sports are also widely played. New Zealand is particularly associated with rugby union, although association football has a larger registered-participant base and cricket is the major summer sport.

In the United States, American football is the leading spectator sport by national preference, but baseball, basketball, ice hockey and association football all have major followings, with substantial regional variation. Canada is strongly associated with ice hockey, while lacrosse is the official national summer sport and association football has the country's largest registered-player base. In Mexico, Chile, Colombia, Costa Rica, Ecuador, El Salvador, Guatemala, Honduras, Panama and Peru, association football is generally the leading spectator sport, although baseball is particularly important in Panama and baseball and football compete closely for popularity in Nicaragua.

Japan, South Korea and Taiwan have strong baseball cultures, with association football also prominent; basketball and volleyball are important additional sports. China has major followings for basketball and association football, while table tennis and badminton have particularly large participation bases. In Hong Kong, association football is particularly popular, with rugby union receiving additional international attention through the Hong Kong Sevens. Singapore also has a broad sporting culture centred particularly on football, badminton, swimming and basketball. Across Brunei, Cambodia, Indonesia, Malaysia, the Philippines, Thailand, Timor-Leste and Vietnam, association football is a major sport, although badminton is exceptionally important in Indonesia and Malaysia and basketball has an unusually strong following in the Philippines. Russia has major association football, ice-hockey, basketball and winter-sport traditions. North Korea also has a strong association football tradition, although reliable information on domestic sporting preferences is more limited.

Melanesia, Micronesia and Polynesia display a mixture of rugby and association football cultures. Fiji, Samoa and Tonga are strongly associated with rugby union, while Papua New Guinea is particularly associated with rugby league. Association football is particularly important in Vanuatu, Solomon Islands, Kiribati, Tuvalu, French Polynesia and New Caledonia. Cook Islands has a strong rugby league tradition, while Niue has rugby union and league followings and Tokelau is notable for its local form of cricket, kilikiti. Several Pacific island territories reflect their historical links with larger countries. American Samoa is strongly associated with American football, while Nauru is notable for being the only country outside Australia which has Australian rules football as the national sport. Guam, the Northern Mariana Islands, Palau, the Federated States of Micronesia and the Marshall Islands have significant followings for basketball, baseball, softball, association football and volleyball, reflecting a mixture of American, Japanese and wider Pacific influences.

The Oceania Football Confederation (OFC) is the continental governing body for association football in Oceania. It currently includes countries from Melanesia and Polynesia, but none from Micronesia. It also included Australia until 2006, when they switched to the Asian Football Confederation, partially due to a lack of competition from the smaller Pacific island countries in the OFC. In a 2001 OFC qualifying match for the FIFA World Cup, Australia had a 31–0 win over American Samoa. The American Samoa game became the largest international victory in the history of the sport, breaking the record set in Australia's previous qualifying match, where they defeated Tonga 22–0. In the American Samoa game, Archie Thompson also broke the record for most goals in an international match, scoring 13. Some Pacific islands and territories are not separately represented by either the OFC or the national football leagues of the sovereign state with which they are politically associated. These include places such as the Aleutian Islands, Easter Island, the Galápagos Islands, Hawaii and the Juan Fernández Islands. In Hawaii, association football has a substantial youth and amateur following, but the islands are not represented in the MLS, the major association football league of the United States and Canada. The Galápagos Islands have amateur football competitions held between the different islands, but the archipelago has never had representation within Ecuador's football league system. Association football has occasionally been played on some of the Aleutian Islands which are closer to the Alaskan mainland, like Unalaska, rather than on the more remote central/western islands. There has never been an outdoor league on any of the islands due to the cold weather. Easter Island and the Juan Fernández Islands also have organized local football culture, and have developed their own representative sides, with these two sides having played against each other and other non-FIFA affiliated representative teams.

== Geopolitics ==
=== Island chain strategy ===
The island chain concept is a geopolitical and military-geographical framework used to describe successive arcs of islands and archipelagos across the western and central Pacific. It is not a formal geographic region with universally agreed boundaries, and the precise islands assigned to each chain vary between sources and between historical periods. The concept is particularly associated with the strategic relationship between China, the United States, Japan and other Pacific states, because the island arcs connect East Asian coastal waters with the wider Pacific Ocean and contain many of the region's principal maritime passages, military facilities and population centers.

The terminology has roots in Cold War U.S. strategic planning. In 1951, U.S. officials described a Pacific "island chain" extending through Japan, the Ryukyu Islands, Taiwan, the Philippines, Australia and New Zealand as an element of U.S. security planning. Contemporary U.S. strategic documents likewise described an offshore island chain encompassing Japan, the Ryukyus, Taiwan, the Philippines, Australia and New Zealand. Other contemporary formulations extended the northern part of the defensive arc through the Aleutian Islands and connected it with U.S.-held positions across the Pacific. This historical "island chain" was broader than the narrower first-island-chain definition commonly used today and could encompass parts of Oceania as well as East and Southeast Asia.

In modern usage, the First Island Chain generally refers to the series of island groups closest to the East Asian mainland; the Kuril Islands, Japanese archipelago, Ryukyu Islands, Taiwan, the Philippines and, in some definitions, the islands of Indonesia and the northern edge of the South China Sea. The chain therefore runs broadly from the Russian Far East southward through Japan and Taiwan and into the maritime boundary zone of Southeast Asia. Japan is central to the concept because both its main archipelago and the Ryukyu island arc form a large part of the chain. U.S. military and strategic literature also treats the first chain as a major geographic feature in the defence planning of Japan, the Philippines and adjacent maritime approaches.

The Second Island Chain is generally placed farther east, although its exact extent is less standardized. A commonly used formulation runs from the Bonin/Volcano Islands southward through the Mariana Islands, including Guam and the Northern Mariana Islands, and through Palau and parts of the Federated States of Micronesia toward New Guinea. Some Chinese and Western strategic writings extend the chain farther south through Indonesia, Papua New Guinea and toward Australia. This variation illustrates why the island-chain concept should not be treated as a fixed cartographic classification: researchers have documented significantly different Chinese definitions of the chains, with some descriptions being considerably more expansive than others.

The Third Island Chain is an even more expansive concept generally associated with the central and eastern Pacific. In many modern descriptions it begins in or near the Aleutian Islands, extends southward through the central Pacific and the Hawaiian Islands, and continues through parts of Polynesia and Melanesia toward New Zealand. Some descriptions place American Samoa, Fiji or other Pacific island groups along this outer arc. Hawaii therefore occupies an important place in many formulations of the third chain, while the Aleutians form its northern extension and New Zealand is commonly treated as its southwestern or southern terminus. The precise line is conceptual rather than a single continuous island arc, since much of the distance between these archipelagos consists of open ocean.

Australia occupies an ambiguous but historically important position in the framework. It was explicitly included in early U.S. Cold War formulations of the Pacific offshore island chain alongside Japan, the Philippines and New Zealand. In later three-chain models, however, Australia is more commonly described as lying between the second and third island chains, or as a major continental anchor of the broader Southwest Pacific rather than as an island-chain component itself. Some strategic discussions nevertheless extend the second chain southward toward Australia, demonstrating again that the boundaries depend on the purpose and source of the map. New Zealand, by comparison, appears consistently in historical U.S. descriptions of the wider offshore chain and in many modern descriptions of the third chain.

The geopolitical importance of the concept differs according to perspective. For the United States, the island arcs historically provided a geographical framework for locating alliances, bases, ports, airfields and other forms of forward military presence across the western Pacific. U.S. policy documents from the early 1950s explicitly connected the security of Japan, the Ryukyus, Taiwan, the Philippines, Australia and New Zealand with wider U.S. security objectives. The framework subsequently interacted with the network of U.S. alliances and defence arrangements in the Pacific, including those with Japan, South Korea, the Philippines and Australia, as well as the U.S. strategic role in Guam and other Pacific territories. For China, the island chains have become an important way of conceptualising the maritime geography immediately beyond China's coastal waters. Research into Chinese military and academic sources has found that Chinese writers do not use a single uniform definition of the chains. Instead, they variously describe them as barriers that constrain movement into the wider Pacific, springboards that can be used for military or maritime power projection, and benchmarks against which China's expanding maritime and air capabilities can be measured. Some Chinese strategic writings therefore use the chains primarily as geographical reference points for discussing China's ability to operate beyond its near seas rather than as a literal uninterrupted defensive line.

== In popular culture ==
In 1989, an Australian miniseries titled Man on the Rim: The Peopling of the Pacific debuted, focusing on the human origins of the Pacific Rim, including the islands. The series also had a book counterpart released. They was hosted by doctor Alan Thorne from the National University of Australia. In 1997, a British miniseries titled Full Circle premiered, hosted by Michael Palin. For the series, Palin traveled across many of the countries on the Pacific Rim, visiting Australia, Bolivia (which is landlocked but used to have Pacific access), Canada, Chile, China, Colombia, Indonesia, Japan, Malaysia, Mexico, New Zealand, Peru, the Philippines, Russia, South Korea, the United States and Vietnam. Palin also visited some of the outlying islands of these countries, including Chile's Chiloé Island and Juan Fernández Islands, and Kodiak Island and Little Diomede Island, which are part of Alaska. Little Diomede Island was chosen as a location because it is one of the northernmost points in the Pacific. For the show, Palin was additionally going to visit Attu Island in the Aleutian Islands, but he was unable to. Palin was also unable to enter North Korea as he had originally planned.

Pacific Rim (franchise) is a science fiction media franchise that consists of Kaiju monster and mecha installments. It includes two theatrical films, Pacific Rim (2013) and Pacific Rim Uprising (2018), and an animated television series, Pacific Rim: The Black (2021–2022). The overall plot centers on a future in which giant Kaiju monsters emerge from an inter-dimensional portal at the bottom of the Pacific Ocean and on the military response to their attacks. Based on an original story by Travis Beacham, the franchise expands on his fictional future by exploring humanity's actions for survival. The original film received positive critical and financial reception. The second film received mixed critical reviews, though it still made a profit at the box office. The franchise expanded with the release of an animated television series, which ran for two seasons and was released exclusively on Netflix. The show was well received by critics and viewers. The franchise will continue with a prequel television series in development.

== Records ==
=== Tallest buildings in Pacific Rim countries ===
Rank	Building	Height	Location	Year completed
1	Merdeka 118	678.9 m (2,227 ft)	Malaysia (Kuala Lumpur)	2023
2	Shanghai Tower	632.0 m (2,073 ft)	China (Shanghai)	2015
3	Ping An Finance Centre	599.1 m (1,966 ft)	China (Shenzhen)	2017
4	Lotte World Tower	554.5 m (1,819 ft)	South Korea (Seoul)	2017
5	One World Trade Center	541.3 m (1,776 ft)	United States (New York City)	2014

=== Tallest mountain peaks in Pacific Rim countries ===
Rank	Peak	Elevation	Location	Range
1	Mount Everest	8,848 m (29,031 ft)	China / Nepal	Himalayas
2	K2	8,611 m (28,251 ft)	China / Pakistan	Karakoram
3	Lhotse	8,516 m (27,940 ft)	China / Nepal	Himalayas
4	Makalu	8,485 m (27,838 ft)	China / Nepal	Himalayas
5	Cho Oyu	8,188 m (26,864 ft)	China / Nepal	Himalayas

=== Oldest universities in Pacific Rim countries ===
Rank	University	Established	Location
1	Sungkyunkwan University	1398	South Korea
2	National University of San Marcos	1551	Peru
3	University of Santo Tomas	1611	Philippines
4	Harvard University	1636	United States
5	College of William & Mary	1693	United States

== Chronology of European exploration in the Pacific Rim ==
- c. 1000: Canada — Leif Eiriksson and other Norse voyagers reached the northern Atlantic coast of present-day Canada, with the archaeological site at L'Anse aux Meadows representing the earliest authenticated European presence in North America.
- 1499: Colombia — Alonso de Ojeda explored the Caribbean coast.
- 1501: Panama — Rodrigo de Bastidas explored the isthmus.
- 1502: Costa Rica — Christopher Columbus reached the Caribbean coast.
- 1502: Nicaragua — Christopher Columbus reached the Caribbean coast.
- 1502: Honduras — Christopher Columbus reached the Bay Islands and mainland coast.
- 1509: Singapore — Diogo Lopes de Sequeira reached Malacca in 1509, establishing the earliest documented Portuguese contact with the wider Singapore Strait region; Portuguese sources subsequently recorded Singapore's earlier history after the capture of Malacca in 1511.
- 1511: Malaysia — Portugal captured Malacca.
- 1511: Cambodia — early European residencies in Cambodia followed the Portuguese seizure of Malacca in 1511.
- 1511: Thailand — Portuguese contact with Ayutthaya began.
- 1512: Indonesia — Portuguese expeditions reached the Moluccas.
- 1513: China, Hong Kong and Macau — Jorge Álvares reached the South China coast/Tamão-Lintin region.
- 1513: Pearl Islands — Vasco Núñez de Balboa first sighted the archipelago during his 1513 expedition across the Isthmus of Panama. Indigenous informants had already told Balboa of islands in the Gulf of Panama rich in pearls, and after reaching the Pacific coast in September 1513 he visited the islands and named them the Islas de las Perlas ("Pearl Islands").
- 1513: United States — Juan Ponce de León reached Florida.
- 1515: Timor-Leste — the first Europeans to arrive were the Portuguese in 1515.
- 1516: Coiba Island — Bartolomé Hurtado, a lieutenant of Gaspar de Espinosa, became the first recorded European to visit Coiba during an expedition along the Pacific coast of Panama.
- 1516: Vietnam — Portuguese navigators first arrived at Hội An in 1516, establishing the earliest documented Portuguese contact with present-day Vietnam.
- 1516–1517: Hainan — Portuguese navigators operating in the South China Sea reached or documented the island during the early Portuguese expansion into China.
- 1517: Mexico — Francisco Hernández de Córdoba's expedition reached the Yucatán Peninsula.
- 1520: Chile and Tierra del Fuego — Ferdinand Magellan passed through the Strait of Magellan.
- 1521: Guam and the Northern Mariana Islands — Ferdinand Magellan's expedition reached the Marianas.
- 1521: Philippines — Ferdinand Magellan's expedition reached Samar and Homonhon.
- 1521: Brunei — European contact occurred during the Magellan expedition.
- 1521: French Polynesia — Ferdinand Magellan's expedition sighted Puka-Puka in the Tuamotu Archipelago, generally regarded as the first recorded European encounter with the islands now comprising French Polynesia.
- 1521: Kiribati — Ferdinand Magellan's expedition sighted Flint Island in the Line Islands, making it the earliest European sighting of territory now belonging to Kiribati.
- 1522: (Honduras) Tiger Island — Gil González Dávila and Andrés Niño explored the Gulf of Fonseca. Dávila reached an island in the gulf which he named Petronila; Honduran historians have identified this island variously with either Meanguera Island or Tiger Island.
- 1524: (Colombia) Gorgona Island — Diego de Almagro led the first recorded Spanish visit to Gorgona, naming the island San Felipe.
- 1524: Guatemala — Pedro de Alvarado led the first Spanish expedition into the territory of present-day Guatemala, entering from Chiapas in January 1524 and beginning the Spanish conquest of the K'iche', Kaqchikel and other Indigenous polities. A Spanish settlement, Santiago de Guatemala, was formally established at Iximché in July 1524.
- 1524: El Salvador — Pedro de Alvarado entered present-day El Salvador from Guatemala and fought the first recorded Spanish engagements with the Pipil population.
- 1525: Federated States of Micronesia — Diogo da Rocha is generally credited with the earliest European contact with the Caroline Islands, probably including Ulithi, which is now part of the Federated States of Micronesia.
- 1526: Ecuador — Spanish reconnaissance reached the coast.
- 1526: (Costa Rica) Cocos Island^{[note2]} — Juan Cabezas is credited by Costa Rican sources with being the first human to sight the island.
- 1526: Marshall Islands — Alonso de Salazar reached the islands.
- 1526–1527: (Papua New Guinea) New Guinea — Jorge de Meneses became the first European generally credited with reaching New Guinea when he was blown off course while travelling from Malacca toward the Moluccas. His exact landfall is uncertain and may have been in western New Guinea, now part of Indonesia.
- 1527: Foca Island and Lobos de Tierra — Francisco Pizarro reached these islands in 1527, the year before he first arrived in what is now mainland Peru.
- 1528: Peru — in April 1528, Francisco Pizarro and his small band of men reached the northern Peruvian coast near Tumbes, and encountered the Inca Empire. The local inhabitants welcomed the Spaniards warmly and they reported seeing a sophisticated stone city with an abundance of gold and silver decorations inside the homes of local chiefs.
- 1528: Clipperton Island^{[note2]} — Álvaro de Saavedra Cerón's reported Isla Médanos may have been Clipperton.
- 1530 or earlier: (Colombia) Malpelo Island^{[note2]} — the island appears on early Peruvian maps; the exact first human sighting is uncertain.
- 1532–1550: Ballestas Islands and Chincha Islands — the Ballestas Islands and Chincha Islands were known to Europeans by the mid-16th century: Pedro Cieza de León, whose travels in Peru date from 1532–1550, explicitly describes the Ballista and Chincha islands off the Peruvian coast. The surviving record does not establish an exact date or a particular European expedition for the first sighting, so a precise discovery year is uncertain.
- 1532: (Mexico) Tres Marías Islands^{[note2]} — Diego Hurtado de Mendoza led the expedition that discovered the islands, which were subsequently also claimed and visited by an expedition sent by Nuño Beltrán de Guzmán.
- 1533: (Mexico) Revillagigedo Islands^{[note2]} — Hernando de Grijalva is the first known human to have sighted the archipelago.
- 1535: (Ecuador) Galápagos Islands^{[note2]} — Tomás de Berlanga became the first known human to land on the islands. He was blown off course while sailing from Panama toward Peru and reached the Galápagos on March 10. When Berlanga and his men landed on the first island, they found an extremely dry, rocky and apparently uninhabited landscape. They searched desperately for fresh water but initially found none, instead encountering animals such as giant tortoises. Berlanga considered the land so barren and stony that little could be cultivated.
- 1539: (Mexico) Cedros Island — reached during Spanish exploration associated with Francisco de Ulloa.
- 1539: (Mexico) Isla Ángel de la Guarda — Francisco de Ulloa's 1539 expedition of the Gulf of California is traditionally credited with the first European discovery of Ángel de la Guarda Island. The island was subsequently recorded and explored by later expeditions, including Wenceslaus Linck in the 1760s.
- 1539 (Mexico) Isla Magdalena — Francisco de Ulloa's expedition of the Pacific coast of the Baja California Peninsula reached and explored the coastal region of present-day Magdalena Bay in December 1539; a Mexican study of the islands and archipelagos identifies Ulloa's voyage as the expedition that discovered Magdalena Bay and the islands forming it. The surviving voyage account does not unambiguously identify the present-day Magdalena Island by name.
- 1539: (Mexico) Santa Margarita Island — Francisco de Ulloa is identified as the first European to discover Santa Margarita Island in a study of the island held by the Universidad Autónoma de Baja California Sur. He reached the island on November 25, while exploring the Pacific coast of the Baja California Peninsula, and it was later given the name Santa Margarita by Sebastián Vizcaíno.
- 1539: (Mexico) Tiburón Island — Francisco de Ulloa's expedition reached the region of Tiburón while surveying the Gulf of California, making 1539 the earliest documented Spanish exploration of the island.
- 1540: (Chile) Chiloé Island — Alonso de Camargo became the first Spaniard recorded to sight the coast of Chiloé while travelling toward Peru. Francisco de Ulloa subsequently explored the archipelago in 1553 and is often regarded as its first European explorer in the more substantial sense.
- 1540: (Mexico) Islas San Benito — a study of the legal history of Mexican islands identifies Francisco de Ulloa's 1539–1540 expedition as having discovered the San Benito Islands after reaching Cedros Island. A reconstruction of Ulloa's route, however, notes that severe weather makes it uncertain whether his ships passed to the east or west of the San Benito group.
- 1540: (China) Zhoushan Archipelago — Portuguese private traders were active at Shuangyu, a port in the Zhoushan island group off Ningbo, by the 1540s; a scholarly history of the maritime region records Portuguese traders gathering there in 1540.
- 1542: (United States) Channel Islands — Juan Rodríguez Cabrillo reached the islands.
- 1542–1543: (Japan) Ryukyu Islands — Portuguese mariners reached or were blown into Ryukyuan waters, and European accounts from the period describe contact with the Ryukyu Kingdom.
- 1543: (Japan) Bonin Islands and Volcano Islands^{[note2]} — Ruy López de Villalobos is credited with the first known human sighting.
- 1543: Japan — Portuguese sailors reached Tanegashima.
- 1544: (Chile) Mancera Island — Juan Bautista Pastene encountered the island during his 1544 expedition and recorded it under the name Imperial; it was then known by several other names before becoming Isla Mancera. The island was already known as Guiguacabin to the Indigenous inhabitants.
- 1544: (Chile) Mocha Island — Juan Bautista Pastene sighted and explored Mocha Island on September 10, naming it San Nicolás de Tolentino.
- 1544: Santa María Island — Juan Bautista Pastene encountered and named the island during his 1544 expedition along the Chilean coast; a detailed study held by Chile's Servicio Nacional del Patrimonio Cultural describes the island as having been discovered during Pastene's first voyage. A later 1550 expedition provides the first detailed account of its Indigenous population and direct contact.
- 1544: Taiwan — Portuguese sailors recorded the island.
- 1553: (Chile) Chonos Archipelago — Francisco de Ulloa's 1553 expedition was the first recorded European exploration of the island region south of Chiloé, and the first recorded European voyage through the Chonos Archipelago. The expedition recorded the islands under the name Islas de Nuestra Señora de la O; the surviving account also describes encounters with Indigenous inhabitants farther south.
- 1553: Guafo Island — Francisco de Ulloa sighted Guafo Island during his 1553 expedition and named it San Martín. The expedition's surviving account records the island before continuing into further archipelagos of southern Chile.
- 1553: (Chile) Guaitecas Archipelago — contemporary and later Chilean accounts identify Francisco de Ulloa's 1553 expedition as the first European navigation of the Guaitecas Archipelago.
- 1553: (Chile) Madre de Dios Island — for Francisco de Ulloa's 1553 expedition, Madre de Dios Island has traditionally been identified with the Madre de Dios recorded in the expedition's geographical nomenclature. A later Chilean naval study states that the island was given the name Madre de Dios by Ulloa's expedition in 1553.
- 1563: (Chile) Desventuradas Islands^{[note2]} — Juan Fernández made the first confirmed sighting. Some accounts list the sighting as being in 1574 rather than 1563.
- 1568: Solomon Islands and Tuvalu — Álvaro de Mendaña reached the islands.
- 1568: Wake Island^{[note2]} — Spanish explorers under Álvaro de Mendaña reached the island.
- 1574: (Chile) Juan Fernández Islands^{[note2]} — Juan Fernández sighted the archipelago on November 22.
- 1577: (North Korea) (South Korea) Korea — Domingos Monteiro and the crew of a Portuguese trading vessel were blown to the Korean coast during a voyage to Japan. The vessel was attacked by Korean forces and escaped without establishing a permanent presence; this is regarded as the earliest documented European contact with the Korean Peninsula as a whole, although the surviving evidence is fragmentary.
- 1579: (United States) Farallon Islands — Francis Drake made the first surviving European record and landed on the islands.
- 1579: Palau — Francis Drake became the first European known with confidence to make landfall on one of the islands of Palau during his circumnavigation of the globe. Earlier Spanish sightings are possible but remain uncertain.
- 1595: Cook Islands — Álvaro de Mendaña reached the islands.
- 1602: (Mexico) Guadalupe Island^{[note2]} — Sebastián Vizcaíno's Spanish expedition became the first documented European expedition to record the island, sailing past it during his 1602 survey of the Pacific coast of Baja California.
- 1606: Australia — Willem Janszoon made the first documented European contact.
- 1606: Torres Strait Islands — Luís Vaz de Torres, commanding part of the Pedro Fernandes de Queirós expedition, sailed through the strait between New Guinea and Australia in 1606, making the first recorded European passage through the region.
- 1606: Pitcairn Islands — sighted by Pedro Fernandes de Queirós.
- 1606: Vanuatu — Pedro Fernandes de Queirós reached the islands.
- 1616: Tonga — Willem Schouten and Jacob Le Maire reached Tonga in 1616 and 1643.
- 1616: Wallis and Futuna — Willem Schouten and Jacob Le Maire reached the islands.
- 1619: (Chile) Diego Ramírez Islands — Bartolomé García de Nodal and Gonzalo García de Nodal, with cosmographer and chief pilot Diego Ramírez de Arellano, sighted the islands on February 10 during their expedition to the southern extremity of South America. The archipelago was named after Diego Ramírez de Arellano.
- 1642: (Australia) Bruny Island — Abel Tasman sailed along the coast of Bruny Island during his 1642 voyage, making him the first recorded European to visit the region. The island was later identified as an island more clearly by Tobias Furneaux in 1773.
- 1642: (Australia) Maria Island — Abel Tasman sighted Maria Island from the sea and named it after Maria van Diemen, wife of the governor of Batavia.
- 1642: New Zealand — Abel Tasman made the first firm documented European sighting.
- 1642: (Australia) Schouten Island — Abel Tasman sighted and named Schouten Island during his voyage along the coast of Tasmania.
- 1642: (Australia) Tasmania — Abel Tasman sighted and mapped the island.
- 1643: Fiji — Abel Tasman reached the islands.
- 1643: (Russia) Kuril Islands — Maarten Gerritszoon de Vries explored the southern Kuril Islands, including Iturup and Urup.
- 1643: (Russia) Sakhalin — Maarten Gerritszoon de Vries mapped the eastern and southern coasts of Sakhalin, including Cape Aniva and Cape Patience.
- 1653: (South Korea) Jeju Island — Hendrick Hamel and the crew of the Sperwer reached Jeju Island.
- 1722: (Chile) Easter Island — Jacob Roggeveen reached the island, and noted that it was inhabited and had numerous large stone heads.
- 1722: Samoa and American Samoa — Jacob Roggeveen reached the Samoan islands.
- 1728: (United States) St. Lawrence Island and Diomede Islands — Vitus Bering reached the region.
- 1741: (United States) Aleutian Islands, Kodiak Archipelago and Alexander Archipelago — Russian expeditions led by Vitus Bering and Alexei Chirikov reached the region.
- 1741: (Russia) Commander Islands — Vitus Bering reached the islands during the return voyage of the 1741 expedition, after his ship was separated from Alexei Chirikov's vessel and subsequently wrecked on Bering Island.
- 1765: Tokelau — John Byron reached the islands.
- 1767: (French Polynesia) Tahiti — Samuel Wallis aboard HMS Dolphin made the first European visit to Tahiti, arriving off the island on June 19 and anchoring at Matavai Bay. Wallis named it King George III Island.
- 1770: (Australia) Booby Island — James Cook landed on the island on August 23 while passing through Torres Strait and named it Booby Island because of its seabirds.
- 1770: (Australia) Dunk Island — James Cook passed the island on June 8 while sailing along the Queensland coast, and named it Dunk Island after George Montagu-Dunk, 2nd Earl of Halifax.
- 1770: (Australia) Eagle Island — James Cook and his crew landed on the small island south-east of Lizard Island on August 13 and recorded it as Eagle Island.
- 1770: (Australia) Family Islands — James Cook sailed through the island group on June 8 while travelling north along the Queensland coast.
- 1770: (Australia) Fraser Island — James Cook made the first recorded European sighting of the island in May 1770 while sailing along the Queensland coast, passing its eastern side and naming Indian Head and Sandy Cape. Cook believed the landform was a peninsula rather than an island; Matthew Flinders subsequently landed there in 1802, but also did not establish that it was an island.
- 1770: (Australia) Lizard Island — James Cook reached and landed on Lizard Island in August 1770, naming it for the numerous monitor lizards observed there.
- 1770: (Australia) Magnetic Island — James Cook passed the island on June 5 and recorded it as "Magnetical Island" because his compass behaved abnormally in its vicinity.
- 1770: Moreton Island — James Cook made the first recorded European sighting of Moreton Bay and Moreton Island during his voyage along the east coast of Australia in 1770.
- 1770: (Australia) Possession Island — James Cook landed on the island on August 22 and recorded Indigenous inhabitants.
- 1770: (Australia) Stradbroke Island — James Cook made the first documented European sighting and named the island's northeastern point Point Lookout.
- 1770: (Australia) Whitsunday Islands — James Cook entered the Whitsundays on June 1 and June 3, 1770, naming Whitsunday Passage and recording the surrounding islands during his voyage along the Queensland coast.
- 1773: (Australia) Cape Barren Island — Tobias Furneaux sighted the island on March 18 and named it Cape Barren because of its barren appearance.
- 1773: (Australia) Furneaux Group — Tobias Furneaux recorded a series of islands in Bass Strait in March 1773 after becoming separated from James Cook's expedition. The group was subsequently surveyed in greater detail by Matthew Flinders in 1798.
- 1773: (Australia) Flinders Island — Tobias Furneaux and the crew of HMS Adventure were the first Europeans to sight Flinders Island in March 1773.
- 1774: (Canada) Haida Gwaii — Juan Pérez sighted the archipelago.
- 1774: New Caledonia — James Cook sighted the island.
- 1774: Niue — James Cook made the first documented European landing on Niue during his second Pacific voyage in 1774.
- 1774: Norfolk Island — James Cook sighted and landed on the island.
- 1774: (United States) San Juan Islands — Spanish expeditions encountered the islands; George Vancouver followed in 1792.
- 1775: (United States) Alcatraz Island — Juan Manuel de Ayala charted the island during the mapping of San Francisco Bay.
- 1778: (United States) (Canada) Hawaii and Vancouver Island — James Cook reached Hawaii and Nootka Sound.
- 1786: (United States) Pribilof Islands — Gavriil Pribylov reached the uninhabited islands.
- 1788: (New Zealand) Bounty Islands — William Bligh discovered the Bounty Islands on September 19 while commanding HMS Bounty on the voyage from Britain to Tahiti. He did not land on the islands.
- 1788: Coral Sea Islands — John Shortland discovered Middleton Reef on July 20 while returning from Australia to Batavia. The broader Coral Sea Islands and reefs were subsequently charted by numerous European navigators.
- 1788: (Australia) Lord Howe Island^{[note2]} — Henry Lidgbird Ball made the first recorded sighting of Lord Howe Island on February 17 and landed there on March 13, 1790 aboard HMS Supply.
- 1789: (United States) Kingman Reef^{[note2]} — an early sighting is attributed to Edmund Fanning.
- 1791: (New Zealand) Chatham Islands — William Robert Broughton became the first European to sight the Chatham Islands on November 29, after his ship, HMS Chatham, was blown off course. He landed on Rēkohu and claimed the islands for Britain.
- 1793: (Chile) Salas y Gómez Island — the Chilean government records that the island was discovered by the Spanish pilot José Salas Valdés on August 23. It was rediscovered and explored by José Manuel Gómez in October 1805, after which the island became known as Salas y Gómez.
- 1796: (United States) Johnston Atoll^{[note2]} — the ship Sally recorded the atoll.
- 1798: (United States) Palmyra Atoll^{[note2]} — human sighting recorded in the late eighteenth century.
- 1798: Nauru — John Fearn sighted the island.
- 1803: (Australia) Cato Reef — John Park and Robert Fowler encountered Cato Island and the surrounding reef on August 17 after the Cato and HMS Porpoise were wrecked on the adjacent reef system. The wreck occurred during a voyage from Sydney toward Torres Strait, and Matthew Flinders was one of the passengers.
- 1803: (Australia) Wreck Reef — Matthew Flinders encountered the reef on August 17 when HMS Porpoise and the Cato were wrecked there.
- 1806: (New Zealand) Auckland Islands — Abraham Bristow became the first European to visit the Auckland Islands on August 18, naming them after Lord Auckland.
- 1810: (Australia) Macquarie Island^{[note2]} — Frederick Hasselborough of the sealing brig Perseverance sighted and landed on Macquarie Island on July 11.
- 1818: (United States) Baker Island^{[note2]} — Elisha Folger documented the island.
- 1821: (United States) Jarvis Island^{[note2]} — the crew of the Eliza Francis reported the island.
- 1821: (United States) Nunivak Island — Mikhail Vasiliev of the Russian-American Company became the first known European to visit Nunivak Island, landing from the Otkrytie on July 11.
- 1842: (United States) Howland Island^{[note2]} — first recorded human sighting is generally dated to this year.
- 1859: (United States) Midway Atoll^{[note2]} — Captain N. C. Brooks reached the atoll.

== List of countries on the Pacific Rim ==
This is a list of countries that are generally considered to be a part of the Pacific Rim or Pacific Basin, since they lie along the Pacific Ocean.

- Canada
- United States
  - American Samoa
  - Hawaii
  - Guam
  - Northern Mariana Islands
- Mexico
- Guatemala
- El Salvador
- Honduras
- Nicaragua
- Costa Rica
- Panama
- Colombia
- Ecuador
- Peru
- Chile
  - Easter Island
- United Kingdom
  - Pitcairn Islands
- France
  - French Polynesia
  - New Caledonia
  - Wallis and Futuna
- Russia
- Thailand
- Cambodia
- Vietnam
- North Korea
- South Korea
- Japan
- Taiwan
- Macau
- Hong Kong
- China
- Malaysia
- Singapore
- Brunei
- Indonesia
- Philippines
- Timor-Leste
- Australia
  - Norfolk Island
- Vanuatu
- Fiji
- Papua New Guinea
- Solomon Islands
- Palau
- Federated States of Micronesia
- Marshall Islands
- Nauru
- Kiribati
- Tuvalu
- Samoa
- Tonga
- New Zealand
  - Niue
  - Cook Islands
  - Tokelau

== Shipping ==
The Pacific has much international shipping. The top 10 busiest container ports, except Dubai's Port of Jebel Ali (9th), are in the Rim nations. They are home to 29 of the world's 50 busiest container shipping ports:

- Canada
  - Vancouver (50th)
- United States
  - Los Angeles (17th)
  - Long Beach (18th)
  - Seattle/Tacoma (48th)
- Panama
  - Balboa (43rd)
- Thailand
  - Laem Chabang (22nd)
- Vietnam
  - Saigon (28th)
- South Korea
  - Busan (5th)
- Japan
  - Yokohama (36th)
  - Tokyo (25th)
  - Nagoya (47th)
  - Kobe (49th)
- Taiwan
  - Kaohsiung (12th)
- Hong Kong
  - Hong Kong (3rd)
- China
  - Shanghai (1st)
  - Shenzhen (4th)
  - Ningbo (6th)
  - Guangzhou (7th)
  - Qingdao (8th)
  - Tianjin (10th)
  - Xiamen (19th)
  - Dalian (21st)
  - Lianyungang (30th)
  - Yingkou (34th)
- Malaysia
  - Port Klang (13th)
  - Tanjung Pelepas (16th)
- Singapore
  - Singapore (2nd)
- Philippines
  - Manila (37th)
- Indonesia
  - Jakarta (24th)
  - Surabaya (38th)

== See also ==
- Cascadia
- Pacific Asia, the Asian portion of the Pacific Rim
- Pacific Century
- Pacific coast
- Pacific Division
- Pacific Northwest

== Notes ==
1. Non-Pacific Rim state.
2. No known human activity before European discovery.

== Bibliography ==
- Clausen, A. W. The Pacific Asian Countries: A Force For Growth in the Global Economy. Los Angeles: World Affairs Council, 1984. ED 244 852.
- Cleveland, Harlan. The Future of the Pacific Basin: A Keynote Address. New Zealand: Conference on New Zealand's Prospects in the Pacific Region, 1983.
- Gibney, Frank B., Ed. Whole Pacific Catalog. Los Angeles, CA: 1981.
- "The Pacific Basin Alliances, Trade and Bases." GREAT DECISIONS 1987. New York: Foreign Policy Association, 1987. ED 283 743.
- Palin, Michael (1997). Full Circle. BBC Books. ISBN 0-563-37121-8.. A travelogue of a complete journey around the Pacific Rim accompanying the 1997 TV series Full Circle with Michael Palin.
- Rogers, Theodore S., and Robert L. Snakenber. "Language Studies in the Schools: A Pacific Prospect." EDUCATIONAL PERSPECTIVES 21 (1982): 12–15.
- Wedemeyer, Dan J., and Anthony J. Pennings, Eds. Telecommunications—Asia, Americas, Pacific: PTC 86. "Evolution of the Digital Pacific." Proceedings of the Annual Meeting of the Pacific Telecommunications Council: Honolulu, Hawaii, 1986. ED 272 147.
- West, Philip, and Thomas Jackson. The Pacific Rim and the Bottom Line. Bloomington, Indiana, 1987.
