= Vladivostok Times =

The Vladivostok Times was an online English-language newspaper based in Vladivostok, Russia. It was founded in March 2006 and operated until 2011. The newspaper was primarily focused on an international, English-speaking audience, and on regional news from Russia's Far East.

Its content also included practical information for tourists, such as consulate contacts, tourist routes, and cultural events.

== Coverage ==
The Times' primary focus was on regional issues relevant to both local and international audiences. Its news sections included topics on:

- Economics
- Politics
- Society
- Ecology
- Culture
- Travel Guide

News stories were often compiled from English translations of articles originally published by other Russian media outlets, such as PrimaMedia, RIA Novosti, and similar sources.

== Closure ==
The Vladivostok Times ceased publication in 2011, with no official reason publicly cited for its closure. Following its closure, no successor publication emerged to fill the niche of an English-language newspaper covering the Russian Far East region.

== See also ==
- Official Website
