= Pacific Division =

Pacific Division may refer to:

- Pacific Division (NBA)
- Pacific Division (NHL)
- Pacific Division (hip hop group)
- Pacific Division (U. S. Army)
- Pacific States or Pacific Division, Division 9 of United States Census Bureau's Region 4: West
