= HCH =

HCH may refer to:

- Hampton Court House, an independent school in Surrey, UK
- Hexachlorocyclohexane, a group of chemical compounds
- Holmes Chapel railway station (National Rail station code), in Cheshire, England
- Huế Central Hospital, in Vietnam
- Huichol language, an indigenous language of Mexico
- Hypochondroplasia, a developmental disorder
- Herbert Clark Hoover, President of the United States
