= Television in the Cook Islands =

Television in the Cook Islands was introduced in 1989. For over 20 years, Cook Islands Television, formerly a government-owned company, held a virtual television monopoly. This was broken in 2010 with the launch of Vaka Television. There is no pan-national TV channel, as CITV ruled out satellite equipment for its signal due to prohibitive costs. Pay TV services are also available.

== History ==
The earliest known reception of television signals into the Cook Islands dates back to 1958, when distant reception of television signals from Hawaii was received, though with no clear picture. In late November 1964, Stuart Kingan in Avatiu received KVZK-TV, which was in its early months of operation.

Petitions to introduce television into the islands were first evaluated in the late 1970s, but were constantly rejected, usually under the grounds that television would wipe out the dominant culture. In the early 1980s, with the advent of video rentals (the first video store opened in Rarotonga in March 1981), television sets and video recorders were brought in. TVNZ conducted test transmissions in July 1986, coinciding with a four day broadcasters' conference in Rarotonga, using a satellite receiver it set up, carrying a commercial-free educational test service. The goal of the trial, which took place between 16 and 19 July, was to counter the spread of B-movies and pornographic titles found on video tapes. The line-up consisted of Billy T. James, Country Calendar, Patsy Rigger, and documentaries of Pacific interest. TVNZ's teletext service was also available. The pilot broadcast aired during the Rarotonga conference for it to provide satellite television into the Pacific, if favourable, it was to be suggested at the South Pacific Forum meeting in Suva the following month.

The Nine Network made an early proposal to introduce television to the Cook Islands in 1987, dependent on events in Fiji. However, the Australian network withdrew from the bid following economic downturn caused by the coups there, forcing the government to side with TVNZ and set up Cook Islands Television. The government set up in May 1989 a plan to launch it by the end of the year; CITV launched on 25 December. Instead of delivering the same CITV signal across all islands via satellite, which was seen as costly, CITV assisted in the creation of stations outside of the island of Rarotonga. Expansion began in 1990 with the start of CITV's services to Aitutaki. Mauke and Manihiki followed in 1992. As of 1993, Atiu, Mitiaro, Mangaia, Penrhyn and Pukapuka were on the cards. CITV sent pre-recorded tapes of programming seen in Rarotonga to the remote islands.

Initially, CITV was part of the Cook Islands Broadcasting Corporation, however, due to an operating loss in 1996, it was privatised, being taken over by the Pitt Media Group in April 1997, which still owns the CITV stations.

The economic reforms of 1996 damaged stations in the outer islands: in Pukapuka, the station there suspended in 1996, but were restored on 5 September 2000 when a new generator was installed. An Australian electrician moved to Mangaia in 1998 and, in 2001, set up Mangaia Television from scratch. The station cooperates with CITV, especially by sending news items to Rarotonga; it is also the only media outlet on the island. As of early 2002, no less than six television stations available on the islands were broadcasting pirated content in the form of videotapes of recent movies, even before home video or local theatrical release. The 1962 Copyright Act did not cover subsequent technologies such as video, meaning that television stations could air such titles.

Te Digital Factory wanted to break the monopoly in 2006, it is unknown if the station opened. October 2010 saw the opening of Vaka Television, still in experimental mode, from Chilli's Sports Bar in the Tupapa district of Rarotonga. Full broadcasts began on 16 December 2010.

On 21 July 2021, Hope Channel made its terrestrial launch in Aitutaki, not long after doing so in Rarotonga.

Analogue television broadcasts ended in 2024. In September 2024, CITV and Vaka TV started airing programmes from Australian commercial networks by entering the PacificAus TV framework which coincided with the introduction of its services on TV Niue.

== Pay television ==
Tahiti Nui Satellite from French Polynesia was accessible locally in the early 2000s upon launch, though the entire offer was in French. On 3 July 2002, Telecom Cook Islands signed a commercial agreement with its French Polynesian counterpart OPT, owner of TNS, to provide three English-language channels from Turner, CNN International, TCM and Cartoon Network, with the service available to locals from August. Tests were being conducted in all islands except Pukapuka and Nassau. TCI supplied the English-language channels, the rest of TNS was mostly in French. A TCI executive considered it a valid alternative to video rentals, which also had a high consumption of pirated videos. It was also a viable solution to provide television signals into the outer islands.

In 2012, it was reported that Aitutaki had two pay-TV operators available: SkyTel and TCI-Marama.

After TCI became Bluesky in 2015, it started delivering the MoanaTV IPTV service, which is fed directly from Samoa through an undersea cable that connects Rarotonga and is then extended to Aitutaki.

== Channels ==
| Name | Owner | Launched | Coverage |
|---|---|---|---|
| Cook Islands Television | Pitt Media Group | 25 December 1989 | Nationwide (with stations for each island) |
| Vaka Television | Vaka Television | 16 December 2010 | Rarotonga |
| Vaka TV 2 | Vaka Television | September 2024 | Rarotonga |
| Vaka TV 3 | Vaka Television | 2025 | Rarotonga |
| Araura TV | Araura TV & Radio | Unknown date in the early 2000s | Aitutaki |
| Mangaia Television | Anthony Whyte | 2001 | Mangaia |
| Pukapuka TV | Pukapuka TV & Radio | 2000 | Pukapuka |
| Atiu Television | unknown | Unknown date | Atiu |
| tumuTeVarovaro TV | tumuTeVarovaro | 2021 or earlier | Rarotonga |
| Hope Channel Cook Islands | Hope Channel International | Late 2010s | Rarotonga and Aitutaki |
