= Pasifika TV =

New Zealand provider of television programmes

Pasifika TV is a New Zealand service that delivers programmes from New Zealand television broadcasters as well as providing a mixed 24-hour satellite service (since 2019). It was established in 1984 as TVNZ Pacific Services. TVNZ owned it until 2015, when it was handed over to Pacific Corporation Broadcasting Limited (PCBL). Under PCBL, the Pasifika TV name was adopted effective February 2016 and the network opened up to commercial broadcasters. Since February 2019, it provides a 24-hour channel featuring selected New Zealand programming as well as programmes drawn in from its member broadcasters in Pacific countries and territories.

== History ==
=== TVNZ Pacific Services ===
TVNZ began providing services to Pacific island nations in 1984 with the opening of its Pacific Services division, the only possible way for most of these islands to receive some form of international television. At the time of its creation, TVNZ was facing competition from a rival bid backed by the Australian Nine Network, at the time owned by Kerry Packer's PBL. The Nine Network's plan involved Fiji, Papua New Guinea, the Solomon Islands, Tonga, Tuvalu, Vanuatu, and Western Samoa. Nine would provide fifty hours of programming to interested broadcasters and would pick the programmes they preferred. TVNZ's bid solidified in May 1986, with the creation of the Regional Television Network at the Pacific Islands News Association Meeting in Apia, where TVNZ would assist in setting up television stations in the Pacific. TVNZ held successive meetings that year to assist in the creation of a non-commercial network for the region, whereas each island that had access to the network would receive a package of tapes containing programming coming from New Zealand.

In March 1987, the South Pacific Forum's Spectel meeting was held in Suva, capital of Fiji. Although the idea was unanimously approved by interested partners, they were yet unable to pay NZ$5 million to make it operational. Nine and PBL were already setting up services in Fiji and in Papua New Guinea (EM TV). Both countries had four fifths of the potential audience and this would hamper TVNZ's Pacific plan. Eventually Fiji was hit by coups d'état and the plan there was halted; this also disabled the Cook Islands from having a Packer-based television station. Moreover, advertisers showed a clear lack of interest in the possible service, leading to virtually nonexistent commercial return, and there were concerns that the introduction of television and Western lifestyles as a whole would be tied to health problems, per a UN study.

The failure of Nine's plans forged TVNZ to sign agreements. Niue was served by a small one-channel cable company, Bliss Cablevision. The company that operated it was shut down following the construction of an underground cable in Lakepa; subsequently, its assets were taken over by the government, who formed the Broadcasting Corporation of Niue, while TVNZ provided assistance, forming TV Niue in October 1988. In order to counter US cultural hegemony, TVNZ would increase its presence in the Pacific. In 1989, TVNZ signed an agreement in the Cook Islands, previously the target of Kerry Packer's Pacific plan. For this end, it signed a deal with the now-defunct Cook Islands Broadcasting Corporation (later privatised; its assets are now held by the Pitt Media Group) to establish Cook Islands Television. TVNZ executives thought the agreement was an "expanded version" of the service it provided to Niue. Plans with Fiji were rekindled and the Solomon Islands still had no plans to introduce a national television service, which hindered expansion plans. By then, television expanded across the region thanks largely to video rentals. A live service was seen as an alternative to the video market, which was seen by executives as something they wouldn't control. For these services, TVNZ compiled programme schedules at the client's requests and sent tapes and fed satellite signals to meet their needs.

The setup of CITV triggered a "domino effect" that created new television stations and, consequently, new customers for the TVNZ Pacific Services unit. After Niue and the Cook Islands, both of which being territories in free association with New Zealand, attention turned to fully-independent countries starting in 1991. Arrangements were made with Nauru Television and Fiji TV in 1991, the latter of which shortlisted TVNZ as its foreign partner in 1992, after providing a trial service for the 1991 Rugby World Cup. Papua New Guinea had two stations, however one of them (NTN) shut down, leaving EM TV alone and without TVNZ's services. Tonga was showing concerns regarding TVNZ's openness and instead entrusted the fundamentalist Christian network OBN to launch its service instead, backed by Evangelicals from Hawaii. The Samoa Broadcasting Corporation opened Televise Samoa in 1991, despite major financial problems. The French overseas territories in the Pacific (New Caledonia, Wallis and Futuna and French Polynesia) all had their own services, fed from RFO. The Chatham Islands, a dependency of New Zealand, started its own television station, Chatham Islands Television, on 22 May 1991, which was already being considered in 1989, when NZ On Air was established and made a NZ$200,000 grant for remote broadcasting to the islands. The TVNZ Pacific Services provided a live feed. The service closed in February 2002, owing to Sky being readily available on the islands and having recently added TV One and TV2.

The TVNZ-assisted Fiji One started permanent broadcasting in July 1994. By the late 1990s, TVNZ Pacific Services had permanent agreements with Fiji TV, Cook Islands Television, TV Niue, Televise Samoa and Chatham Islands Television. It also deployed temporary equipment and services to carry sporting events to the Solomon Islands and assisted in the construction of Television Tonga. It also acquired a whole host of sporting events for the Pacific region, which aired on its member channels. Its sports rights were also supplied for Sky Fiji's Sky Sport channel.

The appearance of FBC TV in Fiji in 2011 was made without TVNZ's services. Riyaz Sayed-Khaiyum said that the first time FBC approached TVNZ for its services, TVNZ rejected, later justifying its rationale on being a government-owned broadcaster.

=== Pasifika TV ===
In April 2015, PCBL was established, dependent on the New Zealand Ministry of Foreign Affairs and Trade. The new service, up until then limited to TVNZ, was now open to other New Zealand broadcasters, including Sky, which provided sport. It also started including programmes from other Pacific states, such as Love Patrol, Vanuatu's first TV series. TVNZ's prior Pacific Service was discontinued effective October 2015, when its contract expired, causing TVNZ to lose government funding. In September 2019, a full Pasifika TV channel launched, covering thirteen countries and territories. Tuvalu.TV joined on 14 September 2023.

== Member broadcasters ==
As of December 2025:

List of Pasifika TV members
Member	Country or territory
Caledonia TV	New Caledonia
Araura TV	Cook Islands (Aitutaki)
CITV	Cook Islands (national)
Mangaia TV	Cook Islands (Mangaia)
Vaka TV	Cook Islands (Rarotonga)
FBC	Fiji
Fiji TV	Fiji
Mai TV	Fiji
Kiri One TV (Wave TV)	Kiribati
FSMTC	Federated States of Micronesia (national)
Pohnpei Public Broadcasting Corporation	Federated States of Micronesia (Pohnpei)
Nauru Television	Nauru
BCN	Niue
Palau TV (PNCC)	Palau
EMTV	Papua New Guinea
NBC	Papua New Guinea
TVWan	Papua New Guinea
KVZK-TV	American Samoa
PCSTV	American Samoa
EFKS-TV2	Samoa
TV3 Samoa	Samoa
TV1 Samoa	Samoa
TVWan	Samoa
SIBC	Solomon Islands
Tavuli News	Solomon Islands
TTV	Solomon Islands
TVWan	Tonga
TBC	Tonga
Tuvalu.TV	Tuvalu
VBTC	Vanuatu
