= List of television stations in Samoa =

This is a list of the television stations in Samoa.

== Overview ==
When television was introduced to American Samoa in October 1964, KVZK-TV was easily received, though the local radio station 2AP would lose listeners because of the Pago station's influence. Plans to launch a television station on the western side were discarded. At the time, KVZK-TV broadcast from 7pm to 10pm every evening except on Sundays, with a chiefly educational line-up. A proposal was made by KVZK to gift one of its surplus television transmitters (entirely in black and white) to Samoa (and another one to Tonga) in 1976, which was to be used for the country's first television station.

Television was introduced in 1993, under the auspices of the Samoa Broadcasting Corporation. Until then, the American side of the islands had television stations operational since 1964 (KVZK-TV). The analog network was switched off on August 31, 2020.

Digital terrestrial television broadcasts were first outlined in 2018, announcing a service of sixteen free-to-air channels, eight TV channels and eight radio stations. The network was built by Samoa Digital Communication Limited (SDCL). Regular broadcasts began on 9 October 2019. SDCL employs the DVB-T2 standard to deliver its signals and covers virtually the entire country.

Name	Owner	Launched	Information
TV1 Samoa	Samoa Quality Broadcasting	1992	Government-owned until 2008.
CGTN	Samoa Quality Broadcasting/China Central Television	2005	Relay station of CGTN, installed when it was under SBC.
EFKS TV	TV2 Network (Congregational Christian Church of Samoa)	May 2013	
TV3 Samoa	Apia Broadcasting Limited	May 2006	Its terrestrial broadcasts were briefly suspended in 2024 due to cost issues.
Upumana TV4	Catholic Media Communication	2010	Catholic channel.
TV5 Samoa	BETA Multimedia Investment Company Limited	unknown	
TV 7	Good News Trust	unknown	
NUSTV	National University of Samoa	29 March 2021	University channel.
Kingdom TV	Worship Centre	unknown	Evangelical channel.
TV9	Broadcasting Services Division	2019	Government-owned channel.

== NUS TV Channel 8 ==
A ceremony to launch the NUS TV broadcast and the NUS lifelong learning initiative was held at the School of Maritime Training on 29 March 2021. The new station launched alongside the National University of Samoa's NUS Lifelong scholarship initiative. Before the launch of the television station, NUS TV was limited to Facebook livestreams.

== TV1 ==
Since the privatization of the state-owned Samoa Broadcasting Corporation in 2008, TV1 is the new television station under the Samoa Quality Broadcasting Limited company has leased the previous FM frequency (89.1FM) & the UHF frequency and facilities of the former SBC studios at Mulinu'u. The shareholders of the newly formed company consist of a few old staff members of the former SBC with Galumalemana Faiasea Matafeo as the Chief Executive Officer.

It continues to offer SBC’s former services such as Tala Fou (News), Lali (National Magazine show), Starsearch (Singing competition), Vaa o Manu (Religious discussion panel) & Faleula o Samoa (Samoan cultural discussion panel). TV1 also carries TVNZ News and live sports feeds.

== EFKS TV ==
They commenced broadcasting in May 2013, owned and operated by The Congregational Christian Church of Samoa, on channels 10 & 11 above Apia. New transmitters have been added on Savaii. It operates as a conventional commercial station but no advertising on Sundays. Carries TVNZ News at 1 pm and 9 pm.

The station opened with funds from the Singapore and London branches of Council for World Mission, and within its first year, it had been operating at a loss, with CCCS members raising concerns at the costs, and recommending a cut in its staff. In 2017, the network reported losses of 3.6 million tala in the period ending December 31, 2016, which would possibly lead to a sale.

== TV3 ==
The Keil family privately owned TV station established its presence in the air in May 2006 and is part of the Apia Broadcasting Corporation.’

Its renowned program is TV3 News, which has Samoa’s only outside live broadcasting facilities, which can broadcast news live from any remote location in Samoa as with other international news agencies. TV3 has often been a reliable service provider to overseas media agencies who require a satellite feed for news footage from Samoa.

Other programmes include Manuo (magazine show) and SamoaTel's Showtime (singing competition). The station operates from 6 am to 12 pm and is received by 90% of Samoan households.

In May 2024, RNZ reported that TV3 had moved its station completely online since it was unable to afford to broadcast traditionally, coupled by the high number of channels in such a small market like Samoa. In the next month, however, it had reverted its decision and resumed terrestrial broadcasts. At the time, it had a staff of 18.

== VBTV ==
VBTV Previously (Vaiala Beach Television) is now operated as a Catholic station broadcasting EWTN, the Catholic TV satellite channel.

== CGTN (CCTV-9) ==
China's state-run broadcaster, China Global Television Network (formerly CCTV-9), rebroadcasts its content on Samoa's free-to-air ultra-high frequency. It carries international and Chinese programs in the English language. It debuted in Samoa in 2005. The retransmission is part of a deal struck with (then) SBC-TV in return for the supply of some satellite reception and transmission equipment to SBC-TV by China. TV1 Samoa, through its parent company Samoa Quality Broadcasting, is still responsible for the relay.

== TV9 ==
TV9 was approved in 2019 and is owned by the government of Samoa's Broadcasting Services Division, long after the 2008 privatization of SBC. As of September 2024, TV9 airs local programmes, news from Australia's ABC, music videos and feature films. The channel was responsible for the television production of CHOGM 2024.

== Subscription television ==
Vodafone Samoa owns an IPTV service (Moana TV) while the Digicel Group operates the regional service Sky Pacific.

== Ceased television stations ==
=== Samoa Broadcasting Corporation (SBC) ===
SBC was Samoa's public television and radio broadcaster created by an act of Parliament in 2003, replacing the old Western Samoa Broadcasting Department. This government entity include both the former Televise Samoa (established in 1993) & Radio 2AP (established in 1929).

The Samoan government then privatized it in late 2008 except the AM station, Radio 2AP.

Among the biggest projects carried out in its short life-span as SBC were the international television coverage of the state funeral of Malietoa Tanumafili II, broadcast in cooperation with TVNZ, Whakaata Māori and TV3 Samoa as well as the 2007 South Pacific Games' live broadcast coverage in Apia.

=== TV Graceland ===
TV Graceland was a Christian station, established in 1997, three years after Graceland FM, and broadcast from the Rhema Christian Center in Apia. The key figures of the radio and TV operation were Ricky and Marge Meredith. To operate the television station, the Merediths gained support from the Trinity Broadcasting Network to assist in the building of three transmitters. It was expected that in September 1997, TV Graceland would have all of its transmitters operational and also receivable in American Samoa via overspill. There were concerns among locals that the station would bring American lifestyles, giving viewers the impression that Americans were wealthier. The channel did not carry commercial advertising, unlike Televise Samoa.

=== O Lau TV ===
A new Samoan free to air TV station was established and first aired in early 2006. It ceased operation in October 2007. The channels (10 and 11) are now used by EFKS TV, a commercial channel operated by The Congregational Christian Church of Samoa.

=== Samoa Television and Radio ===
Samoa’s only 24-hour television station began operations from the former Lau TV studios on March 9, 2009. STAR was owned by George Pitt, part of the Pitt Media Group of the Cook Islands. The station closed in 2011.
