= PacificAus TV =

Australian feed of television programs

PacificAus TV is a programming service funded by the Australian Department of Foreign Affairs and Trade providing a feed of programs from Australian commercial television networks, backed by FreeTV Australia. Broadcasters receive a 24-hour feed of the channel, which is encrypted and reserved for use to the members. The signal is delivered through the Intelsat 19 satellite.

As of March 2026, eighteen broadcasters in twelve countries are members of the service.

== History ==
PacificAus TV was created in 2020 as an Australian soft power initiative to counter the rising influence of China in the region. It was first announced in May that year with the first target countries being Papua New Guinea, Fiji and the Solomon Islands. Vanuatu, Kiribati, Tuvalu and Nauru would follow later. This involved an initial three-year period where 1,000 hours worth of programmes would be screened in the region. The service reportedly started on 8 June, when Fiji's Mai TV began carrying its programmes.

In September 2024, Cook Islands Television, Vaka Television and TV Niue started airing its output.

In September 2025, a deal with Football Australia was inked, valid until year-end 2027.

== Criticism ==
The primary goal is to promote the true image of Australia to the Pacific, which differed from the one provided by Neighbours and Home and Away, where the households depicted in the soaps were a pipe dream for most Australians, less so for the Pacific nations, where the population is relatively poorer. The selection of some shows was also criticised by Kate Clayton in a 2022 article, such as Better Homes & Gardens being selected even when climate change hampered the Pacific islands, while Border Security, criticised for its depictions of Pacific Islanders denying entrance into Australia, was removed after airing in the initial line-up.

== Member broadcasters ==
As of March 2026:

List of PacificAus TV members
Member	Country or territory	Year it joined
Mai TV	Fiji	2020
Fiji Television	Fiji	2020
Fiji Broadcasting Corporation	Fiji	2020
Kiri One TV (Wave TV)	Kiribati	2020
Nauru Television	Nauru	2020
National Broadcasting Corporation of Papua New Guinea	Papua New Guinea	2020
EMTV	Papua New Guinea	2020
Telekom Television	Solomon Islands	2020
Tuvalu.TV	Tuvalu	2020
Vanuatu Broadcasting and Television Corporation	Vanuatu	2020
TV1 Samoa	Samoa	2021
EFKS TV2	Samoa	2021
TV3 Samoa	Samoa	2021
Tonga Broadcasting Commission	Tonga	2021
Cook Islands Television	Cook Islands	2024
Vaka Television	Cook Islands	2024
Broadcasting Corporation of Niue	Niue	2024
Rádio e Televisão de Timor-Leste	Timor-Leste	2025
