= Chatham Islands Television =

- Country: New Zealand
- Broadcast area: New Zealand
- Headquarters: Waitangi, Chatham Islands

Ownership
- Owner: Chatham Islands Radio and Television Society, Inc.

History
- Launched: 22 May 1991; 35 years ago
- Closed: 28 February 2002; 24 years ago (regular service)

Chatham Islands Television was a volunteer-run television station broadcasting to the Chatham Islands and owned by the Chatham Islands Radio and Television Society, headed by Terry Tuanui. The station broadcast from a former shearing shed on Tikitiki Hill, in the outskirts of Waitangi.

It began broadcasting in 1991 and received significant funding from New Zealand On Air during its operation. The programmes were obtained from videotapes flown in from the mainland and shown for a period of up to six hours. The only live programme seen was One Network News; the rest was videotapes from the programme packages. Successive budget cuts led to reductions in airtime beginning in 1997. The station shut down in February 2002 when funding ended and the two mainland TVNZ channels were added to Sky.

== Background ==
The idea of bringing television to the Chatham Islands was first suggested by Postmaster-General Scott. At the time, the islands already had a "24-hour radio watch" and he suggested the creation of a closed-circuit television station, at a time when the islands were the only part of New Zealand with no television coverage. In order to give some amount of entertainment, its programming would include a handful of old films, but ruled out news, which would still be heard on radio. The plan for a closed-circuit station came in opposition to NZBC's 1968 study, which envisioned a terrestrial television station, which turned out to become unsatisfactory as there was no reliable television coverage. The plan for a closed-circuit channel airing films would also harm the island's cinema, which would offer the same at a cheaper price.

Minister of Broadcasting Walker said in September 1971 that the system proposed in 1969 would be expensive.

On 21 November 1978, Hugh Templeton announced that advancements in technology meant that the Chatham Islands would be served by a television station. This scheme would involve an airport delivering films and tapes of mainland NZ programming, which would be sent to the islands and supplied to the station.

By the late 1980s, some islanders had access to a VCR to watch hired films. This led to the decrease in the long-established habit of heading to the County Hall to watch feature films, which were mostly American.

== Early years ==
The first live television appearance of the islands happened at the very end of 1989 when a Japanese television crew flew there to record the first sunrise of the world in the 1990s from Manukau Point. This was an initiative from commercial broadcaster Nippon Television, who teamed up with TVNZ's Dunedin office to produce a 12-minute segment. This broadcast would test the limits of TVNZ's outside broadcast skills and was expected to air at midnight on NTV's network in Japan, which was five hours behind the Chatham Islands, for an audience of 10 million.

In June 1990 the newly-formed funding body, NZ On Air, showed keen interest in a local television station there, approving a NZ$200,000 funding scheme for that purpose; the operational costs were included as part of its Remote Transmission Coverage funds. Details of the service were still being worked out, in July, a TVNZ technical team were set to visit the islands to investigate the establishment of a television transmitter and a satellite receiver. The new service would provide some form of television since one group was relaying Australian signals were barred from carrying their services when those signals became encrypted. Other small Pacific regions had similar schemes. The signal was fed from TVNZ's Pacific Services, which had already provided its content to TV Niue and Cook Islands Television, both of which being national channels of the free associated states of New Zealand.

The introduction of television was seen with opposition from historian Michael King, who thought that it would destroy the local culture, as he wanted to have the islands' characteristics intact. With television, this would assimilate the islands into mainland New Zealand culture. Bunty Preece, chairman of the Chatham Islands County Council, claimed that television would give islanders information on what was happening in the rest of the world. A NZ$262,750 grant from the Lottery Grants Board was handed on 17 October 1990; by then, it was expected that the service would be on air by March, while NZ On Air was eyeing the construction of up to five translator stations to cover the entirety of the islands. However, there was some opposition to the launch of the service in late February, or early March as initially planned, if the necessary contract was signed with TVNZ. This would also imply upgrades to existing sets or aerials. The Chatham Islands Television and Radio Society planned the inclusion of a TVNZ programme planner for its first three months to survey the local population and shape its schedule. The funds were questioned by the opposition. The government was reviewing the service's costs, almost facing closure in November 1990, but the project ended up in safety.

Chatham Islands Television started broadcasting on 22 May 1991 as part of one of several lottery grants for the development of the infrastructure of the islands. The introduction of television also coincided with the implementation of direct dial telephones. CITV had a central transmitter and five relays in order to ensure total coverage in the islands. In addition to lottery grants, NZ On Air and TVNZ (through its Pacific Services unit) had a fundamental role in its development, when the funding agency made an unusual subsidy worth NZ$220,000 to cover the delivery of airlifted pre-recorded programmes and satellite equipment. Sporting events requiring the TVNZ Pacific Services package cost one fifth of the cost for live coverage. TVNZ compiled the programming, but its final form was determined by local decisions.

It was opened by Graeme Lee alongside Rob Storey. An opening ceremony was held on the eve of its launch where Lee said that it would become "a true community television service". There were no commercials and the volunteers had a camera used to film local events to carry on the station. By the end of the year, television had become part of local life. Visitors from the mainland commented on the lack of advertisements, the station instead preferred typewritten messages between programmes. One recent example involved a fuel tank which was lost between the airport and Port Hutt. At its 1992 annual meeting, Terry Tuanui told that more operators were needed to keep the station operational by giving up hours of their leisure time. NZ On Air funding totalled NZ$234,000 in 1991 and NZ%228,000 in 1992. In 1993, Christine Fenby and Diana Riley from TVNZ visited the station. At that time, the number of volunteers had fallen down to six, and if the number would fall further in two years' time, the future of the station was in jeopardy. By September of that year, there were some changes to the schedule: when daylight saving time was observed, One Network News was shown on tape delay at 9pm; "programmes of particular and general interest" such as Frontline would not air before 8:30pm; the Saturday night movie was now at 8:30pm while the drama slot that used to air moved to after the movie; emphasis was given to British comedy rather than American during adult viewing times; TVNZ supplied public service advertisements free of charge and the "Goodnight Kids" message before adult viewing time began; and TVNZ began establishing a library of family movies, such as E.T. during school holiday periods.

A 1995 profile from The Independent showed that the station opened at 5pm and ended at 11pm. The bulk of the programmes were videotapes obtained weekly from mainland New Zealand, though this delivery was not possible every week due to potential occasional limitations. The only regular programme seen live via satellite was One Network News at 6:45pm local time. Instead of commercial advertising, it carried a service where viewers could type their own advertisements and messages. The remainder of the programming consisted of imports, including The Bill and Knight Rider. That year, only 58% of the Chatham households paid the NZ$110 fee; NZ On Air thought that the islands had the lowest compliance level for the broadcasting fee. By 1997, as profiled in a Kiwi Winners item, the station was staffed by a team of seven volunteers, while the most popular programmes according to the station's manager were "probably Blue Heelers, Water Rats and the news, definitely". Fenby made a new visit on 13-16 May 1996, shere she advised CITV to include new educational programmes; regarding the selection of programmes, certain titles were likely no longer available. She also told that there were no plans to discontinue the station, but its line-up was the best available, in spite of a lack of choice. A shortfall in its funding that year caused a reduction of its airtime.

== Appearance of Sky, budget cuts and closure ==
By August 1996, the islands were served by Sky's satellite service. One of its subscribers by September 1998 was a fishing traveller from the islands. The installation of satellite dishes caused no short-term fee compliance; as of August 1997, less than half of its viewers were paying for CITV's broadcasting fee. CITVRS issued an advertisement on the June 1998 edition of Chatham Islander urging locals to pay their broadcasting fees to continue supporting the channel, fearing a change to NZ On Air's funding model from 1 July, which could spell a reduced schedule. An improved television service could arrive to the islands if a terrestrial channel (TV One, TV2 or TV3) could launch via satellite; NZ On Air indicated the Society that locals would assist in its relays.

In August 1997 TV One's airtime of Coronation Street changed, meaning that it was not covered by the five-hour programming window CITV had. Islanders even made a petition to restore the soap to its previous airtime, much like what happened in the mainland.

In April 1998 Sky threatened legal action against the unauthorised use of its satellite service, which was seen as an alternative to CITV, and that it only re-broadcast programmes from TV One and TV2. Locals were watching rugby matches from Sky Sport without a subscription, which led to legal action from Sky. The video packages also flown in from the mainland did include rugby matches, but these were shown at a later time, only after TVNZ aired them.

NZ On Air could not afford a 6½-hour service for the islands; in 1999 it had been reduced to approximately 4¼ hours, while the operating sum was cut to just NZ$159,000. With these cuts, coupled by the failure of locals to pay their broadcasting fees, the station was facing an uncertain future, and the funding allocated covered the period ending the end of June. An alternative to the counterfeit Sky broadcasts was suggested in May 1999 where NZ On Air suggested the creation of a composite 24-hour Chathams Channel, at the annual cost of NZ$105,000; its schedule was a mix of key programming and events carried by Sky's 16 channels. (Note: The channels available for relay were Sky's guide and mosaic, Sky 1, TNT, Granada UKTV, Cartoon Network, Juice, National Geographic Channel, Discovery Channel, Discovery Channel, Animal Planet, ESPN International, TAB Trackside, CNN International, CNBC Asia, Sky News (which relayed One News and Holmes and Prime. Sky Sport and HBO were exempt from the proposal.) The funding agency viewed this as an interim solution, which would be replaced by a terrestrial channel if it was made available on the platform. This meant that viewers would finally have access to 24-hour television, but One News would be screened at 9:15pm and some TVNZ programmes would no longer be available. The decision to create the channel was applauded by the funding body and was seen as a cost-effective alternative to the existing service, and that also met its criteria. The new system was put up under negotiation on 12 July, where forty locals presented their views. There were three options: the mixed-genre Sky channel, the status quo, where One News would no longer be sent, and the satellite receiver would not be needed, and a TV news service supplied by TVNZ, reducing the schedule to just over three hours, with One News and other popular TVNZ programmes, without advertisements. The deadline for correspondence was 4 August, but due to lateness from NZ On Air, it was delayed to 12 August. Unlike other stations served by TVNZ's Pacific Service, such as Cook Islands Television, TV Niue and Fiji One, CITV relied on broadcasting fees. A majority of locals suggested option 3, where TVNZ supplied the news and an additional sixteen hours of programming a week. Prime made Prime Living available free of charge on a trial basis, under the grounds that if CITV took it as a regular programme, it would have to pay for it.

In October 1999 the station aired a portion of an erotic film by mistake; one of the volunteers, Lea Clough, thought it was the movie Amistad. The only complaint was an immediate one from a viewer who wanted it to be on again.

The station made international headlines throughout December 1999 when the Australian branch of international advertising agency Euro RCSG created a 90-second spot that CITV would air after midnight on 1 January 2000. The agency saw the islands' time zone (UTC+12:45) as being advantageous, as well as being the first part of the world to see in the new year and the new millennium, to carry such a commercial. It was priced at US$15,000 and featured notable firsts from the 19th and 20th centuries, accompanied by Judy Garland's rendition of Over the Rainbow and ending with the messages “The world belongs to those who dare to be first” and “You have been watching the first commercial of the millennium”. By then, foreign outlets were reporting that the station's airtime fell to just three hours a day. For the station's millennium coverage, manager-volunteer Tom Brown converted a garage into a makeshift television studio.

During 2000, negotiations took place with TVNZ to provide a digital service to the islands, however, due to government policies, this would not be implemented in the near future.

Funding from NZ On Air ended in February 2002, leading to the end of the station. The latest schedule information is from 28 February 2002, date in which the channel lost funding. As a result of funding cuts, broadcasts now started with a half-hour family slot, featuring either a cartoon (Butt-Ugly Martians, Ed, Edd n Eddy etc.) or live-action programming (America's Funniest Home Videos and Making the Band), while after the news, the channel aired a mixture of lifestyle programmes and TV series. Night Visions ended up being the very last programme seen. The funding body justified its rationale on the arrival of TV One and TV2 to the Sky platform. With the termination of the funding agreement, the Chatham Islands Television & Radio Society became responsible for television broadcasts there. Tom Brown, the volunteer who set up the station, was honored the following month. As of the end of 2001, 180 residents received Sky, while 74 were dependent on CITV.

In 2003, CITVRS was still operating a skeleton service relaying the main edition of One News though inserting local advertising during commercial breaks. There was still no termination date for the service.

The volunteer company was ultimately dissolved on 12 May 2005, after three years of inactivity. It was reported, though, that in 2007, the advertising arrangement still existed.
