= Telecommunications in Tuvalu =

Telecommunications in Tuvalu cover Tuvalu's 6 atolls and 3 reef islands. The islands of Tuvalu rely on satellite dishes for communication and internet access.

The Tuvalu Telecommunications Corporation (TTC), a state-owned enterprise, provides fixed line telephone communications to subscribers on each island and mobile phone services on Funafuti, Vaitupu and Nukulaelae. TTC is a distributor of Fiji Television service (Sky Pacific satellite television service).

== Telephones ==
Telephones - main lines in use: 2,000 (2021)

Telephones - mobile cellular: 9000 (2021)

Telephone system:
domestic: fixed-line teledensity is 18 per 100 and mobile-cellular is 80 per 100
international: country code - 688; international calls can be made by satellite

== Radio and television ==
Radio broadcast stations: AM 1, FM 0, shortwave 0 (2011) - The Tuvalu Media Department of the Government of Tuvalu operates Radio Tuvalu, which broadcasts on the AM frequency. In 2011 the Japanese government provided financial support to construct a new AM broadcast studio. The new AM radio transmitter on Funafuti replaced the FM radio service to the outer islands and freed up satellite bandwidth for mobile services.

Radios: 4,000 (1997)

Television broadcast stations: TTC is a distributor of Fiji Television service (Sky Pacific satellite television service).

Televisions: unknown number.

== Internet Service Providers (ISPs) ==
Country code (Top level domain): TV (see .tv)

Tuvalu.tv is the sole provider of Internet access in Tuvalu. The ISP is operated by the ICT (Information and Communications Technology) Department of the Government of Tuvalu.

In 2012 the available bandwidth was only 512 kbit/s uplink, and 1.5 Mbit/s downlink. Throughout Tuvalu are more than 900 subscribers who want to use the satellite service, with demand slowing down the speed of the entire system. TTC currently operates satellite internet services with less than 20 Mbit/s of capacity. In June 2014 TTC signed a five-year agreement with Kacific Broadband Satellites for the supply of provide high speed bandwidth to the islands of Tuvalu.

From 2017 the service was provided by the Kacific-1 satellite - Ka band High-throughput satellite (HTS) provided by Kacific Broadband Satellites which provided TTC with increased levels of capacity over the period.

In July 2020, the Government of Tuvalu signed a five-year agreement with Kacific for 400 Mbps to 600 Mbps of satellite capacity. the agreement provides a comprehensive turnkey service including sixty 1.2 metre VSAT terminals (satellite dishes) for schools, medical clinics, government agencies and small businesses, forty outdoor WiFi access points to support community connectivity with WiFi hotspots, three maritime antennae to connect ferry services, and one Ka-band antennae to provide trunking and backhaul services for the mobile phone network.

As of February 2022, the delivered satellite capacity into Tuvalu was a combined capacity of 510 mbps split between Agility Beyond Space (ABS) (Ku Band) and Kacific (Ka band). The average download of data per device is about 9 GB/user/month, with 95% of devices in use being 4G/ LTE capable. Also, Tuvalu has 5,915 active broadband users (the largest base of users is on Funafuti), with dedicated satellite and hotspot users on the outer islands, each of which has 3 to 5 hotspots.

== Tuvalu Telecommunications and ICT Development Project ==
In January 2019 the World Bank approved a US$29 million grant for the Tuvalu Telecommunications and ICT Development Project which is intended to boost internet connectivity in Tuvalu, including to the country's outer islands. The project will also support investments in an international optical fiber submarine cable to provide faster, lower-cost internet bandwidth.

The project will include reforms of the Tuvalu Telecommunications Corporation (TCC) to redevelop the government-run entity as a public-private partnership (PPP) in cooperation with an experienced international telecommunications operator, which will be selected using a competitive process.

The project will involve the government of Tuvalu using a submarine cable system to connect Funafuti atoll to the international optical fibre network. The private sector partner in the PPP will be responsible for the design, installation and operation of the cable and network. The Tuvalu Vaka subsea cable was connected in 2025, together with the introduction of Starlink community gateways, they transform digital connectivity and expand access to essential services by providing continuous access to telecommunication services. The roll out of Fibre to the Premises (FTTP) in Funafuti, also expanded access to high-speed internet. The Starlink Community Gateway was funded under a World Bank ICT project, and provides redundancy with the VAKA cable.
