= Fiji Two =

- Country: Fiji
- Broadcast area: National
- Headquarters: 78 Brown Street, Suva

Programming
- Languages: English, Hindi, iTaukei
- Picture format: PAL-576i (SDTV 16:9)

Ownership
- Owner: Fiji Television
- Sister channels: Fiji One; FijiTV Stream (online)

History
- Launched: 5 August 2016; 9 years ago

Links
- Website: fijionenews.com.fj

Availability

Terrestrial
- Digital: Channel 5

Fiji Two (also known as Channel 2) is a free-to-air television channel run by Fiji Television. Created in 2016 to take advantage of the arrival of digital terrestrial television (the Walesi platform), the channel provides an alternative offering to Fiji One.

== History ==
In July 2015, shortly after Fiji Television got a new 12-year license, the company announced that, in line with the introduction of the Walesi DTT service, it would launch a second terrestrial channel, Fiji Two, exclusively on the platform. It was announced that the channel would lean towards entertainment. The announcement came when Fiji TV was selling Sky Pacific to Digicel.

In July 2016, during the channel draw for Walesi TV, Fiji Two was announced for channel 5. On 5 August, Fiji Two started broadcasting. Its coverage area increased when Walesi was rolling out its national network of transmitters. By September 2018, it was already carrying Shortland Street relayed from Pasifika TV.
