= Telecommunications in the Cook Islands =

Logo of Telecom Cook Islands

Telecommunications in the Cook Islands is limited by the country's low population and isolation, like most countries and territories in Oceania. There is only one major television broadcasting station and six radio stations. However, most Cook Islands residents have a main line or mobile phone. Its telecommunications are mainly provided by Telecom Cook Islands, who is currently working with O3b Networks, Ltd. for faster Internet connection. Telecom Cook Islands was majority owned by Spark New Zealand until 2015, when it sold its interest to Teleraro Limited.

== Telephone ==
Telecom Cook Islands is the islands' main telephone system and offers international direct dialling, Internet, email, fax, and Telex. Telecom Cook Islands was majority owned by Spark New Zealand until February 2015, when Spark sold its 60% interest for approximately NZ$23 million (US$17.3 million) to Teleraro Limited, which was 75% owned by Bluesky Samoa. In 2019 Amalgamated Telecom Holdings (ATH) of Fiji bought a controlling stake in the Bluesky group, which gives ATH control of Telecom Cook Islands. Since 2020 Telecom Cook Islands has had the trading name of Vodafone Cook Islands.

In July 2012, there were about 7,500 main line telephones, which covers about 98% of the country's population. There were approximately 7,800 mobile phones in 2009. The individual islands are connected by a combination of satellite earth stations, microwave systems, and very high frequency and high frequency radiotelephone; within the islands, service is provided by small exchanges connected to subscribers by open wire, cable, and fibre-optic cable. For international communication, they rely on the satellite earth station Intelsat.

In 2003, the largest island of Rarotonga started using a GSM/GPRS mobile data service system with GSM 900 by 2013 3G UMTS 900 was introduce covering 98% of Rarotonga with HSPA+. In March 2017 4G+ launch in Rarotonga with LTE700 (B28A) and LTE1800 (B3).

Mobile service covers Aitutaki GSM/GPRS mobile data service system in GSM 900 from 2006 to 2013 while in 2014 3G UMTS 900 was introduce with HSPA+ stand system. In March 2017 4G+ also launch in Aitutaki with LTE700 (B28A). The rest of the Outer Islands (Pa Enua) mobile was well establish in 2007 with mobile coverage at GSM 900 from Mangaia 3 villages (Oneroa, Ivirua, Tamarua), Atiu, Mauke, Mitiaro, Palmerston in the Southern Group (Pa Enua Tonga) and the Northern Group (Pa Enua Tokerau) Nassau, Pukapuka, Rakahanga, Manihiki 2 Village (Tukao, Tauhunu) and Penrhyn 2 villages (Omoka Tetautua).

The Cook Islands uses the country calling code +682.

== Broadcasting ==
There are six radio stations in the Cook Islands, with one reaching all islands. As of 1997 there were 14,000 radios.

Cook Islands Television broadcasts from Rarotonga, providing a mix of local news and overseas-sourced programs. As of 1997 there were 4,000 television sets.

== Internet infrastructure and connectivity ==
=== History ===
The internet was first set up in the Cook Islands in 1995 by Casinos of the South Pacific (also the first iGaming license in the country). Donald Wright and his nephew Darren Wright set up a 256K connection in Telecom Cook Islands facilities, connected to Telecom New Zealand. The Cook Islands is one of the birthplaces of the iGaming industry.

There were 6,000 Internet users in 2009 and 3,562 Internet hosts as of 2012. The country code top-level domain for the Cook Islands is .ck.

In June 2010, Telecom Cook Islands partnered with O3b Networks, Ltd. to provide faster Internet connection to the Cook Islands. On 25 June 2013 the O3b satellite constellation was launched from an Arianespace Soyuz ST-B rocket in French Guiana. The medium Earth orbit satellite orbits at 8,062 kilometres (5,009 mi) and uses the K_{a} band. It has a latency of about 100 milliseconds because it is much closer to Earth than standard geostationary satellites, whose latencies can be over 600 milliseconds. Although the initial launch consisted of 4 satellites, as many as 20 may be launched eventually to serve various areas with little or no optical fibre service, the first of which is the Cook Islands.

In December 2015, Alcatel-Lucent and Bluesky Pacific Group announced that they would build the Moana Cable system connecting New Zealand to Hawaii with a single fibre pair branching off to the Cook Islands. The Moana Cable is expected to be completed in 2018.

== Digital transformation ==
As a small island digital state the Cook Islands faces a unique set of challenges in digital transformation, one being that it is heavily reliant on international support and cooperation to develop and fund its ICT improvement projects.

Until 2019, Telecom Cook Islands was the sole provider for internet, mobile and fixed telephone communications for the country. Internet was provided via satellite which was costly to the government with an unreliable connection especially to the outer islands. The passing of the Competition and Regulatory Authority Act 2019 (CRA) and the Telecommunications Act 2019 provided the opportunity for new competitors to join the market. It also provides for subsidising the provision of telecommunications to areas or customer groups which cannot reasonably be served on a commercial basis.

The passing of the CRA and Telecommunications acts paved the way for the Cook Islands Government to establish the state owned enterprise, Avaroa Cable Limited. This was made possible through the funding from New Zealand Aid Programme and the Asian Development Bank.

=== Digital transformation initiatives ===
In July 2020 the Cook Islands were connected to the Manatua One Polynesia Fibre Cable, which links the Cook Islands, Niue, Samoa and Tahiti. The cable has landing points at Rarotonga and Aitutaki. Then in September 2020 Avaroa Cable Limited and Vodafone Cook Islands signed a partnership for use of the Manatua One Polynesia Fibre Cable, making Avaroa Cable Limited the first company to be awarded a telecommunications licence under the new Cook Islands Competition and Regulatory Authority Act 2019.

In December 2021, the contract was awarded to Wellington-based IT company Aiscorp for the upgrade of the Cook Islands government network infrastructure. This project is ongoing and has lasting impact, benefits for the government, and the people of the Cook Island as they work towards the centralised system being available to all of government. Individual Government agencies and state-owned enterprises are continuing with development and implementation of digital plans.

With facilitation support from the Asian Development Bank the latest version of the Cook Islands National ICT policy was launched.

From 24 June 2024, in a partnership with LexisNexis a global leader in legal publishing, the Cook Islands government have launched a new website, Laws Of The Cook Islands - Te Au Ture O Te Kuki Airani, with features including a comprehensive legal database, user-friendly interface and regular updates, with the aim of increasing transparency. More information is available in the Cook Islands Legislation.

After years of research, analysis, development and financial support from international bodies such as the United Nations, New Zealand Agency for International Development (NZAID) and Asian Development Bank as contributors, the Cook Islands celebrated a key milestone in its digital transformation journey in February 2024 with the launch of its first ever National Digital Strategy 2024 to 2030. The vision for the Cook Islands is "A digitally empowered and inclusive Cook Islands, where technology enhances all lives, fosters innovation, drives economic growth and prosperity, improves social services, and protects our unique culture and environment – while building a shared identity for our island home."

With the successive rollout of the above initiatives the Cook Islands needed to ensure that set clear foundations for tackling online harm and cybercrime, securing the information and data held by its government and respective agencies, ensuring the safety of its people and protection of its critical national infrastructure. This consideration has resulted in the development of its first cyber security policy.

On 6 January 2025, the Ministry of Foreign Affairs and Immigration announced that the new online visa and permit application was now live. Developed in conjunction with the United Nations Conference on Trade and Development (UNCTAD) this platform allows the thousands that visit each year a more efficient and effective service.
