= Kiri One TV =

Kiribati television channel

Kiri One TV is a television channel in Kiribati, owned by Taotin Media and part of the wider Wave TV service, in turn part of the Click Pacific subscription television network led by Fijian journalist Richard Broadbridge. Wave TV has twenty channels, most of them encrypted, Kiri One TV being one of the free-to-view channels.

== History ==
Kiri One TV and, by extension, Wave TV, represent the first local television service of any kind in Kiribati since the shutdown of Television Kiribati in 2013. After its closure, most locals, apart from radio, had little to no contact with the outside world. In 2018, Richard Broadbridge worked for the creation of Wave TV, which worked in association with the Papua New Guinea-based pay-TV network Click Pacific. In May 2018, its launch was expected for July, with service starting in Tarawa, and later expanding to other atolls. The plans stipulated a 20-channel service with free and paid offerings.

Launching Wave TV was also seen as problematic given the country's geography. In Tarawa alone, the biggest challenge would be setting up antennas given the fact that the coconut trees had a large height and not all households were made out of brick. For the rest of the country, since Click TV operated via satellite in Papua New Guinea, the logical option was to send the satellite service into Kiribati.

Not long after launching, in March 2019, Wave TV's news unit told Radio New Zealand that it would provide "culturally sensitive" news. At the time, most of Wave TV's in-house production consisted of news and current affairs. Current affairs programming was also a contentious point for the PNG-trained staff, largely because of cultural traditions, which the staff was unaware of. If the presenters spoke incorrect terms, the news would end.

On 1 August 2020, it joined the recently-launched PacificAus TV, airing a selection of its programming; two days later, its contents joined the schedule, causing a 10% increase in its ratings.

In 2022, it received a mobile journalism kit from Pasifika TV. On 23 March 2023, Kiri One and Hope Channel signed a memorandum of understanding to launch Kiribati Hope Channel on its platform.

== See also ==
- Media in Kiribati
