= TV9 (Samoa) =

- Country: Samoa
- Broadcast area: Samoa
- Headquarters: Apia, Samoa

Programming
- Picture format: 1080i (HDTV)

Ownership
- Owner: Broadcasting Services Division (Ministry of Communications and Information Technology)

History
- Launched: 2019; 7 years ago

Links
- Website: https://www.tv1samoa.com

TV9 (rendered in digital terrestrial television metadata as Government Channel TV9) is Samoa's government-owned television station. Established in 2019, the station falls under the Broadcasting Services Division of the Ministry of Communications and Information Technology. Being a public broadcaster by nature, it has to provide essential emergency information in cases of extreme weather. The station is a sister of 2AP, Samoa's oldest radio station.

== History ==
What is now the Broadcasting Services Division of the MCIT was formerly the Samoa Broadcasting Corporation, which operated Televise Samoa/SBC TV One, Samoa's first television station. The television channel was put for privatization in 2007, while the sale was completed on 21 July 2008.

The BSD of the MCIT submitted a plan to launch its own television channel on 21 July 2018 as part of the country's plan to introduce digital television. It was approved in 2019.

In September 2022, the channel suspended its operations from the digital terrestrial platform and was merely showing a test card. It was, however, ordered to have it restored.

2AP-TV9 received a mobile journalism unit donated from Australia's ABC in October 2023. TV9 served as the host broadcaster for CHOGM 2024.

In June 2025, it improved its technical capacities with the installation of an AEQ XPEAK system.

== Programming ==
As of September 2024, TV9 airs local programmes, news from Australia's ABC, music videos and feature films.
