= CITV (disambiguation) =

CITV was a British free-to-air children's television programming block and former children's channel owned by ITV plc.

CITV may also refer to one of the following:

- CITV-DT, Global Television Network owned-and-operated station in Edmonton, Alberta
- CITV (Bermuda), local government-run channel in Bermuda
- CiTV (Estonia), former television channel in Estonia
- Cook Islands Television, oldest television station in the Cook Islands
- Commander's Independent Thermal Viewer, as on M1A2 and later variants of the M1 Abrams tank and many other modern tanks.
