= Tuvalu Telecommunications Corporation =

State-owned Tuvaluan telecommunications company

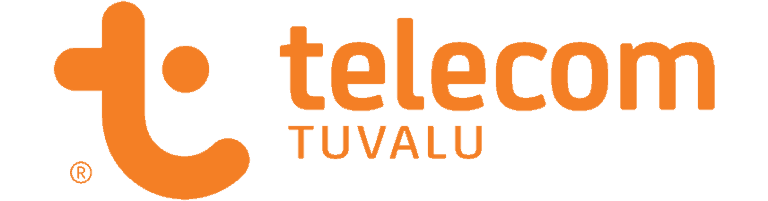

Agency overview
- Jurisdiction: Tuvalu
- Headquarters: Funafuti
- Employees: 47 (2009)
- Agency executive: Simeti Lopati, General Manager
- Parent agency: Minister for Communications and Transport
- Website: TuvaluTelecom.tv

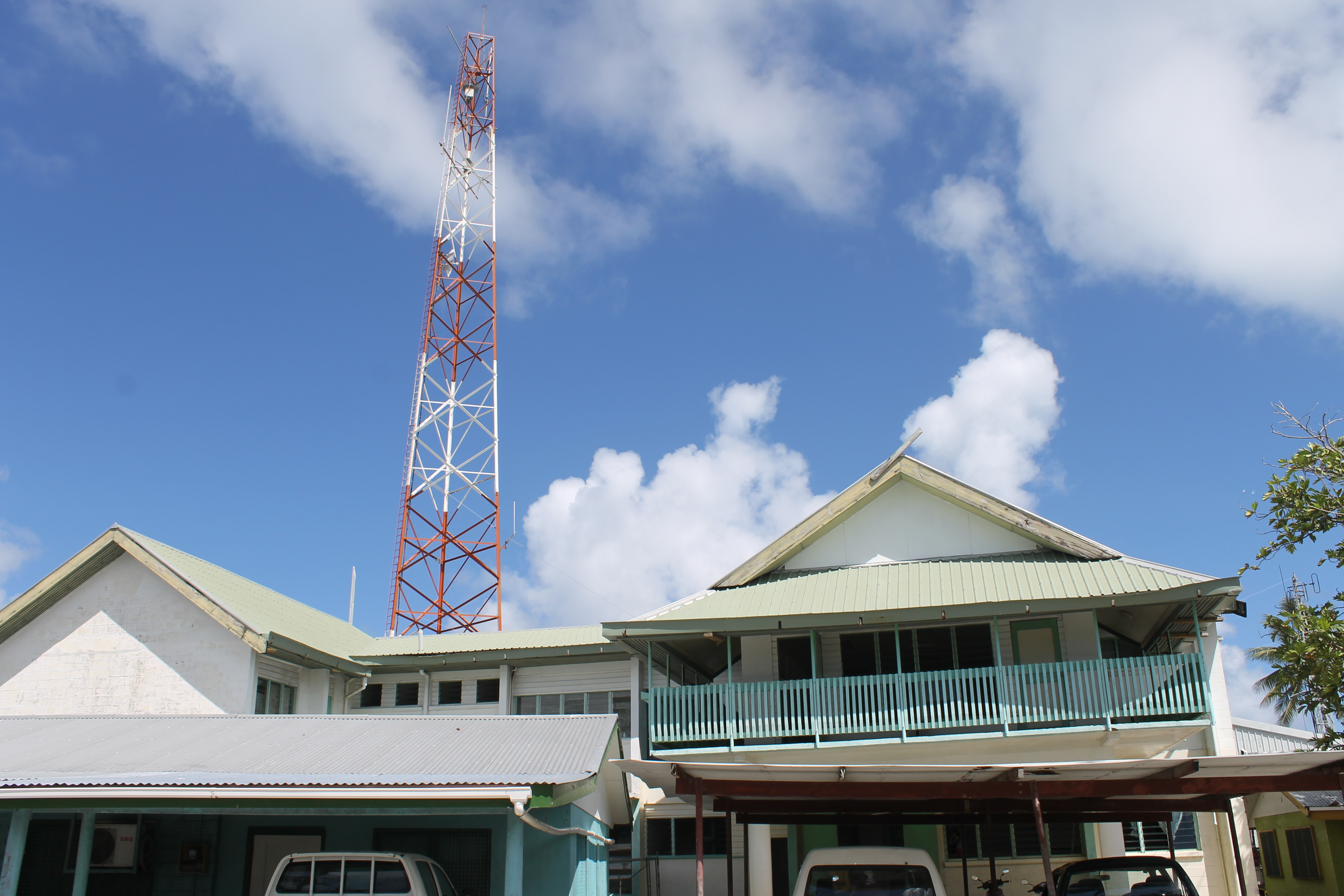
Offices of the Tuvalu Telecommunications Corporation

Tuvalu Telecommunications Corporation (TTC) is a state-owned enterprise of Tuvalu, which provides fixed-line telephone communications to subscribers on each of the islands of Tuvalu. Each island in Tuvalu relies on TTC for the use of a satellite dish for inter-island telephone communication and internet access. TTC also provides mobile phone services on Funafuti and Vaitupu. TTC is the sole provider of Telecommunications in Tuvalu. TTC is established by the Tuvalu Telecommunications Corporation Act 1993.

== Satellite broadband services ==
TTC currently operates satellite internet services with less than 20 Mbit/s of capacity. In June 2014, TTC signed a five-year agreement with Kacific Broadband Satellites for the supply of high speed bandwidth to the islands of Tuvalu. The service will be provided by the Kacific-1 satellite - Ka-band High Throughput Satellite (HTS) - that was due to be launched in late 2016 or early 2017. Kacific would provide TTC with increasing levels of capacity over the 5-year period, starting with 80 Mbit/s and up to 150 Mbit/s after four years. TTC can take extra capacity - up to 225 Mbit/s.

== Satellite pay television services ==
TTC is a distributor of Fiji Television service (Sky Pacific satellite television service).

== Tuvalu Telecommunications and ICT Development Project ==
In January 2019 the World Bank approved a US$29 million grant for the Tuvalu Telecommunications and ICT Development Project which is intended to boost internet connectivity in Tuvalu, including to the country’s outer islands. The project will also support investments in an international optical fiber submarine cable to provide faster, lower-cost internet bandwidth. The project will include reforms of the TTC to redevelop the government-run entity as a public-private partnership (PPP) in cooperation with an experienced international telecommunications operator, which will be selected using a competitive process.
