= Television Kiribati =

State-owned television service in Kiribati

Television Kiribati Ltd (TKL), or TV Kiribati, was the sole, state-owned service in Kiribati.

== Programming ==
Established in 2002, it broadcast "local and foreign programmes", and was accessible only in South Tarawa (the country's capital) and in the neighbouring island-town of Betio. It provided "about one hour of local programming" on weekdays, and did not broadcast over week-ends. As of 2006, its manager was Tom Kaitara.

In January 2006, TKL received a bid to operate internet services and was waiting for a license. In only carried part of the 2006 Commonwealth Games because a TVNZ decoder arrived late from Fiji due to transmission problems.

== Undetermined suspension ==
Television Kiribati was suspended by the government in March 2013, due to "serious financial problems", and its personnel's "lack [of] expertise and knowledge in programming and production". The government announced a review to determine whether the closure should be permanent. As it was the only television service, viewers in Tarawa South were left with access to radio and newspapers as their media for information.

There was no local television at all until 2018, when a separate channel, Kiri 1 TV, owned by Taotin Media through Click Pacific, started operations.

== See also ==
- Media in Kiribati
