= Atiu Television =

- Country: Cook Islands
- Broadcast area: New Zealand
- Headquarters: Atiu, Cook Islands

Programming
- Picture format: 1080i (HDTV)

Atiu Television is a television station in the island of Atiu in the Cook Islands. The station operates from the local telecom mast which is also responsible for relaying television signals.

== History ==
When Cook Islands Television was set up in 1989, it covered the island of Rarotonga, signal expansion began in 1990 into Aitutaki. The introduction of television in Atiu was still on the cards in 1993.

Some sort of television station was operational in the 1990s; as of 1998, it was reportedly off air, and remained that way in 2000. Service resumed before early 2002: The New Zealand Herald reported that the station was set to receive a pirated copy of The Lord of the Rings: The Fellowship of the Ring from Piho Rua, a former policeman who owned four video shops in Rarotonga. The movie had not been released on legal home video supports yet at the time; moreover, the station and five other available in the Cook Islands were frequently airing pirated movies. In 2006, the station was accessible via a $5 subscription and broadcast its programming for four and a half hours a day, four nights a week.

As of 2015, Atiu Television received "several signals", but only transmitted one channel at a time.
