= Radio Sunshine =

Radio station in Niue

Radio Sunshine is the national radio station of Niue, owned by the Broadcasting Corporation of Niue. The station broadcasts in English and Niuean, over 594 kHz AM and 88.6 MHz FM, from 06:00 to 21:30.

== History ==
The station started operating in the early 1960s (year unknown) under the callsign ZK2ZN. The New Zealand Broadcasting Corporation supplied equipment and made a programme schedule to cater to local tastes. The sole studio had a half Gates mixer, two AKG microphones, a receiver from a Japanese boat and one reel-to-reel tape recorder. Very few households received radio signals at the time, prompting Radio Sunshine to sign a contract with Japanese company National to supply several hundred receivers at wholesale prices in 1967. After 1972, the government built its own transmitter.

On 6 February 1984, the station moved from 837 to 594 kHz, improving reception in the outer villages. The station relayed WVUV, inherited from a "lazy habit" of some of its employees, as the station was heard clearly after 9:10pm, its closing time.

The station moved to 88.0 MHz FM in November 2015 in order to be received on cars imported from Japan.
