= Telephone numbers in the Cook Islands =

Telephone numbers in the Cook Islands use the country calling code +682 and have five-digit national significant numbers; the international call prefix is 00. Geographic number ranges are allocated to Rarotonga and the other inhabited islands, with Rarotonga numbers beginning with 2 and separate prefixes assigned to islands including Aitutaki, Atiu, Mangaia, Pukapuka, and Penrhyn. Mobile numbers use ranges beginning with 50–58, 7, and 8, while numbers beginning with 59 are allocated to voicemail and service numbers.

== NumberING in the Cook Islands ==
Country Code: +682
International Call Prefix: 00

National Significant Numbers (NSN): five digits

Format: +682 XX XXX

LIST OF ALLOCATIONS
Locality	Routing code to reach subscriber		Routing code to reach operator		
Locality	Country code	Telephone number	Area code	Operator code	Operator assistance
Rarotonga	682	2 XXXX		Code 11	Rarotonga Operator
Aitutaki	682	31 XXX			
Reserved for Aitutaki growth	682	32 XXX			
Atiu	682	33 XXX			
Mangaia	682	34 XXX			
Mauke	682	35 XXX			
Mitiaro	682	36 XXX			
Palmerston	682	37 XXX			
Pukapuka	682	41 XXX			
Penrhyn	682	42 XXX			
Manihiki	682	43 XXX			
Rakahanga	682	44 XXX			
Nassau	682	45 XXX			
mobile	682	50 XXX			
mobile	682	51 XXX			
mobile	682	52 XXX			
mobile	682	53 XXX			
mobile	682	54 XXX			
mobile	682	55 XXX			
mobile	682	56 XXX			
mobile	682	57 XXX			
mobile	682	58 XXX			
Voicemail and service number only	682	59 XXX			
mobile	682	7X XXX			
mobile	682	8X XXX			

== See also ==
- Telecommunications in the Cook Islands
