= FreeTV Australia =

Association of free-to-air Australian TV networks

FreeTV is the industry body that represents the Free-to-air Australian TV networks. It is unique in that it is an industry body that has all the companies in the industry as members.

== Overview ==
Formerly known as the Federation of Australian Commercial Television Stations (FACTS), and Commercial Television Australia (CTVA), the body promotes advertising on television, looks after certain engineering standards, handles the classification of advertising (ClearAds), and generally promotes the interest of its members (the free to air commercial networks). The FreeTV also represents the industry's interests with the Australian Communications and Media Authority, which is the governmental body responsible for ensuring that media and communications works for all Australians.

The current chief executive officer is Bridget Fair.

== Criticism ==
In 2009, FreeTV Australia came under criticism regarding the review of the Code of Practice for commercial television and its proposed changes to the program content/advertising distinctions.

== See also ==
- PacificAus TV
