= .ck =

Top-level Internet domain for the Cook Islands

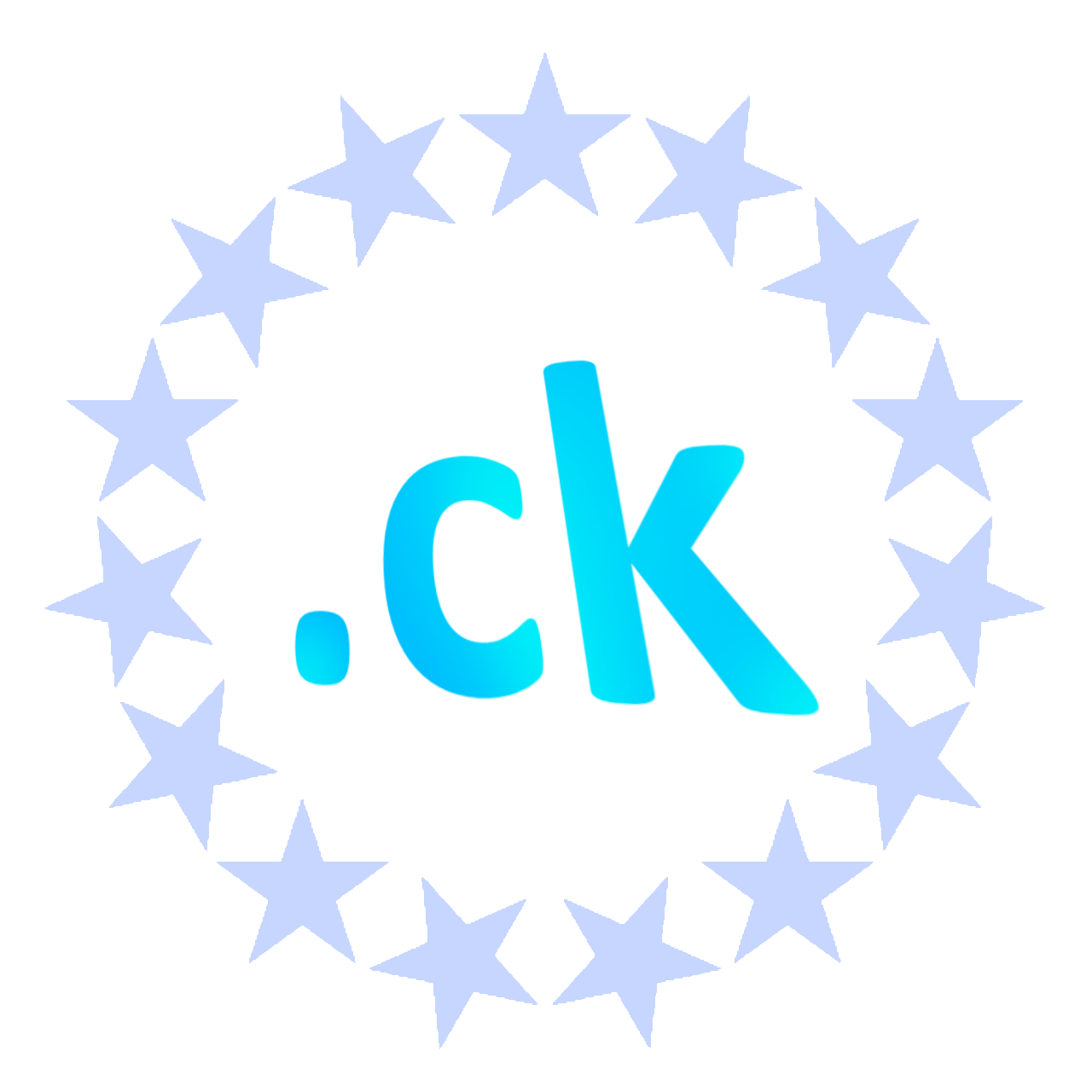
- Introduced: 8 August 1995
- TLD type: Country code top-level domain
- Status: Active
- Registry: Oyster Internet Services
- Sponsor: Telecom Cook Islands
- Intended use: Entities connected with the Cook Islands
- Actual use: Gets some use on Cook Islands
- Registration restrictions: Companies must use name based on their legal name
- Structure: Registrations are made at the third level beneath second-level categories
- Documents: Domain Admin Policy
- Dispute policies: UDRP
- DNSSEC: No

.ck is the Internet country code top-level domain (ccTLD) for the Cook Islands.

== Registration ==
Registrations are within these second-level categories:

Domain	Intended purpose
.co.ck	Business organizations
.org.ck	Not-for-profit organizations
.edu.ck	Educational institutes
.gov.ck	Government-related websites only
.net.ck	Internet Service Providers
.gen.ck	Individuals and organisations not covered elsewhere
.biz.ck	Business related pages for the Cook Islands

=== Requirements ===
Pre-requisites for applying for a domain is as follows:

1. Non-resident domain applications cost €222.00 (EUR) for a minimum of 2 years, and must be renewed every 2 years thereafter.
2. Applications for a domain if it is already taken or is not affiliated with brand or name identity to you or your company e.g. 'nike.co.ck', 'mobil.co.ck', etc.
3. Domains considered profane will not be considered on any level, and the application will be dissolved with the applicant being notified, and future requests for the same domain name will be ignored. '.ck' domains are monitored on the web, on a regular basis for profanity on the Internet if it is found to be doing so, or if the site is deemed inappropriate, the domain will be terminated without notification or refund.

== Usage of .co.ck ==
.co.ck has been used as a humorous domain suffix because of its similarity with the English vulgarity "cock":

- In the British sitcom Nathan Barley, the principal character registers his website, "trashbat", in the Cook Islands simply so that it has the suffix, which he always pronounces "dot cock."
- One of the payloads of the MEMZ trojan causes a user's computer to open satirical Google searches under "Google.co.ck"

== See also ==
- .nz
- .tk
- .nu
