= List of newspapers in Kiribati =

This is a list of newspapers in Kiribati.

- Kiribati Independent: private, fortnightly; circulation 500
- Kiribati Times: weekly
- Kiribati Voice: weekly, close to Teburoro Tito
- The Kiribati Newstar: private, weekly, owned by Ieremia Tabai
- Tarakai: weekly, owned by the Fishermen's Association
- Te Mauri: weekly, religious (Protestant, KUC)
- Te Uekera: state-owned, published twice-weekly; circulation c. 1,500 per week

== See also ==
- Media in Kiribati
- List of newspapers
