= Danooct1 =

American Internet personality

- Born: Daniel White; October 1, 1990 (age 35)

X information
- Handles: @danooct1; @danooct1_txt

YouTube information
- Channel: danooct1
- Years active: 2008–present
- Genre: Documentary
- Subscribers: 318 thousand
- Views: 74.0 million
- Last updated: April 23, 2026

Daniel White (born 1990) is an American YouTuber who specializes in demonstrating and documenting computer viruses and other forms of malware on his YouTube channel danooct1. Since 2008, he has demonstrated hundreds of pieces of malware—mostly DOS viruses from the 1980s and 1990s—on his YouTube channel, which has amassed a loyal following and tens of millions of total video views.

== Channel ==
In his videos, White demonstrates malware on both virtual machines and actual period-correct hardware. White first became interested in computer viruses in 2004, after his desktop computer was infected with Sasser, a worm which reportedly affected up to one million computer systems running Windows XP and Windows 2000 in the early 2000s. While trying to diagnose his computer, White came across F-Secure's comprehensive online database of computer viruses spanning back to the 1980s. He quickly became engrossed in the database, which spurred him to read other resources about the history of computer viruses. In 2008, he started uploading videos demonstrating old computer viruses to his danooct1 YouTube channel. Within five years, he had uploaded over 450 virus demonstrations and had accrued over 22,000 subscribers and over 7.4 million video views. By 2021, he had over 300,000 subscribers.

White often obtains samples of malware from tipsters who send him infected files to demonstrate on the channel. In order to prevent the spread of malware to his primary workstation, White disables network virtualization in his virtual machines and keeps the system under test unplugged from his home network when using real hardware. He explained in 2013: "For the most part, the stuff I handle won't do much of anything, if anything at all, on modern PCs and operating systems. [But] I live by the philosophy, 'if you're not willing to lose all the data on every PC on the network, don't start toying with malware.'" As sending malware to other users through his YouTube channel would violate YouTube's terms of service, White refuses all requests by viewers to obtain these infected files.

White often prefers demonstrating viruses for DOS and early versions of Microsoft Windows, as their payloads tend to be the most technically and audio-visually creative, in his view. By contrast, viruses since the mid-2000s have largely been "financially motivated", according to White, with most being in the ransomware genre, in which the malware attempts to extort victims for money by encrypting the contents of their hard drive until a ransom is paid. White's viewers also tend to prefer more vintage viruses, with his most popular video being a demonstration of YouAreAnIdiot, a Trojan horse for Windows 9x; as of 2026, it has amassed 7.9 million views. While preferring such "vintage" malware, White has occasionally demonstrated more modern examples with interesting payloads, including NotPetya and WannaCry, both examples of ransomware from 2017.

Beginning in 2016, White began a series on his channel entitled Viewer-Made Malware, in which he demonstrates malware developed by his subscribers for the express purpose of demonstrating on his channel. One video in the series, demonstrating a Trojan horse by the name MEMZ developed by subscriber Leurak, became a viral video and was praised by Vice magazine for its intensely chaotic payload.

== Personal life ==
White was born in 1990 and is from Dallas, Texas. He is a cartographer by trade, having studied satellite imaging systems in graduate school. He is also an amateur musician on the side, making 8-bit chiptune music.
