= MEMZ =

Computer trojan horse

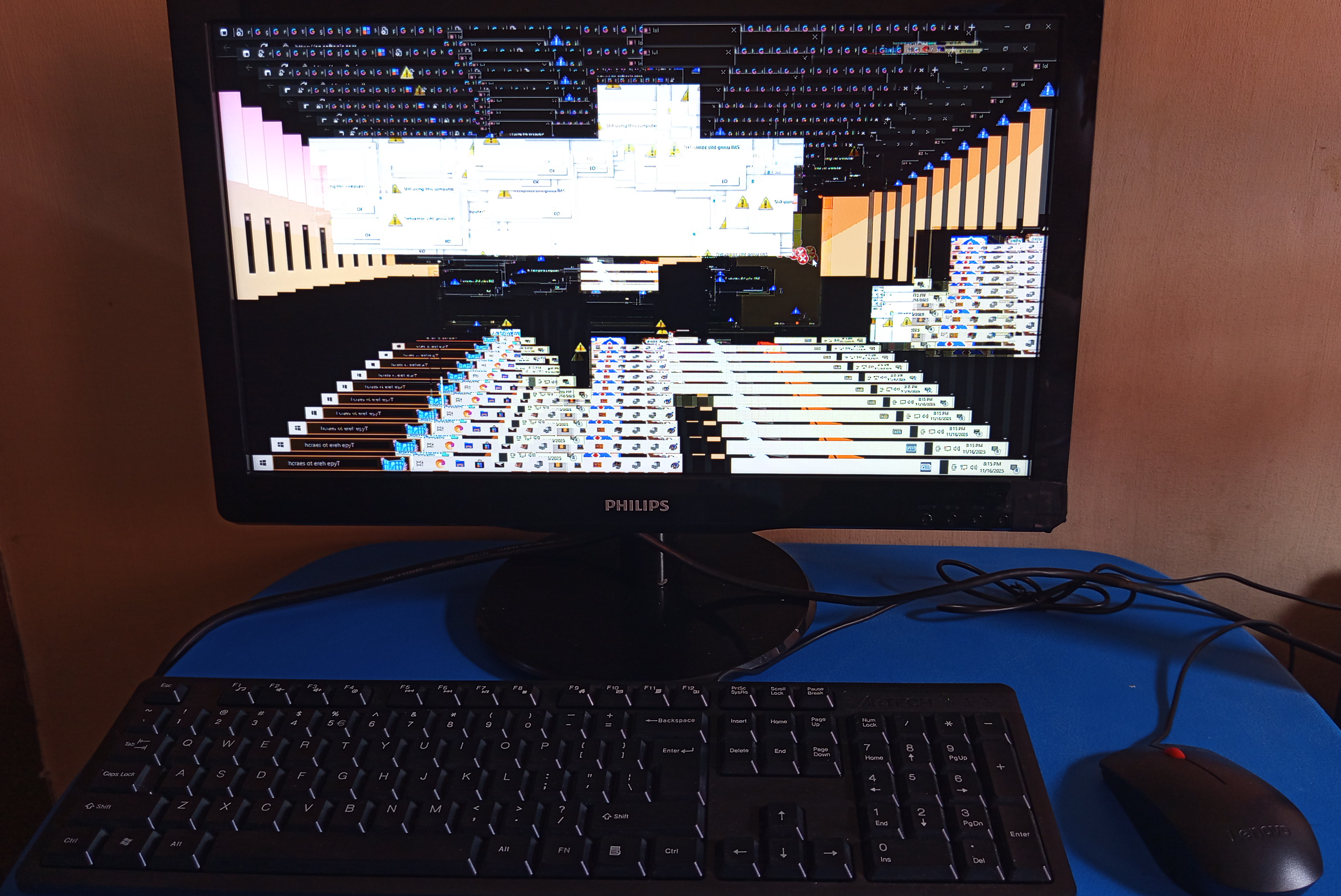
- A computer infected with the MEMZ Trojan. Depicted is one of the malware's key payloads, a "screen tunneling" effect.

Malware details
- Type: Trojan horse
- Author: Leurak

Technical details
- Platforms: Windows XP and later

MEMZ /miːmz, mɛmz/ is a trojan horse created for Microsoft Windows. The name of the malware refers to its purpose as a humorous Trojan intended to replicate the effects of early computer viruses.

== Origin ==
MEMZ was originally created by Leurak for YouTuber danooct1's Viewer-Made Malware series in 2016.

== Payloads ==
The trojan gained notoriety for its unique and satirical payloads which automatically activate after each other, some with delay. Examples of payloads include displaying a Windows Notepad file that reads:

YOUR COMPUTER HAS BEEN FUCKED BY THE MEMZ TROJAN.

Your computer won't boot up again, so use it as long as you can! :D

Trying to kill MEMZ will cause your system to be destroyed instantly, so don't try it :D

MEMZ-Clean menu

Others include randomly moving the cursor slightly; opening up comedic Google searches under Google.co.ck, such as "how to remove a virus" and "how to get money" on the user's web browser; reversing text; and opening various random Microsoft Windows programs, such as the calculator or command prompt. True to the program's name, many parts of the trojan are based on Internet memes; for example, the trojan overwrites the master boot record with an animation of Nyan Cat. Leurak also created a safer version of MEMZ called MEMZ-Clean. The clean version allows the non-destructive payloads to be safely tested and gives the user full control about which payloads are active.
