= EFKS TV =

Samoan television channel

- Country: Samoa
- Broadcast area: Samoa
- Headquarters: Apia, Samoa

Programming
- Picture format: 1080i (HDTV)

Ownership
- Owner: Congregational Christian Church of Samoa

History
- Launched: 16 May 2013; 12 years ago

EFKS TV, also known as TV2 EFKS, TV2 or TV2 Network, is Samoan television station owned by the Congregational Christian Church of Samoa. It began operations on 16 May 2013 on VHF channels 10 and 11, later adopting the TV2 branding upon obtaining a digital LCN.

== History ==
The Congregational Christian Church of Samoa opened its TV station (alongside its radio sister) on May 16, 2013, led by Tuiasau Uelese Petaia, former CEO of TV1 Samoa, and covering 80% of the country, hoping to reach 100% coverage within three months of operation. Both stations were launched using funding from the Council for World Mission in Singapore and England, but planned to become self-sufficient over time. The choice of Petaia was controversial due to his 18-month jail sentence after 67 counts of conviction, which was completed the previous year. The station broadcast on VHF channels 10 and 11 and with a further relay on UHF channel 30.

Initially operating at a budget between 500,000 and 1.1 million tala; within its first year, it had been operating at a loss, with CCCS members raising concerns at the costs, and recommending a cut in its staff. In 2017, the network reported losses of 3.6 million tala in the period ending December 31, 2016, which would possibly lead to a sale. It was subsequently decided at the CCCS/EFKS annual conference for that year that the station should remain a church operation at 100%.

In May 2023, a member of the CCCS decided to monitor the station's contents and suspend a program that was airing political messages. By 2024, the Samoa Tribune reported that the station had become a commercial operation.
