= Cook Islands Television =

Television station in the Cook Islands

- Country: Cook Islands
- Broadcast area: Cook Islands
- Headquarters: Rarotonga, Cook Islands

Programming
- Picture format: 1080i (HDTV)

Ownership
- Owner: Pitt Media Group

History
- Launched: 25 December 1989; 36 years ago

Links
- Website: https://www.citv.co.ck

Cook Islands Television (abbreviated CITV) is the oldest television station in the Cook Islands. Founded in 1989, it broadcasts from Rarotonga, where Avarua, the national capital, is located. Broadcasts began on 25 December of that year as a "Christmas gift" to Cook Islanders from the Prime Minister. Until 1996, it was owned by the government; it saw it as a loss-making operation and opted to sell it to private owners.

CITV is owned by the Pitt Media Group, headed by Ms. Shona Pitt, who also owned TV Niue. As of May 2026, Jeanne Matenga is the channel's head.

== History ==
In 1986, reports emerged in the press that Australian companies, which were due to introduce television in Papua New Guinea and Fiji, were pressing to introduce television to smaller Pacific nations, among them the Cook Islands. The first proposal to set up a television service to Rarotonga was submitted by the Nine Network in 1987, the project would work depending on the situation in Fiji. The plan failed due to the economic downturn caused by the Fijian coups and Nine withdrew from the project.

In 1988, a change in power occurred following elections in the islands and the introduction of television was seen as a priority by the new government. A new proposal was submitted by Television New Zealand, which unlike the Nine Network, didn't recommend a free-to-air system for broadcast. Its involvement was purely commercial, with the Cook Islands Government providing funds and TVNZ purchasing and setting up production equipment and initial basic training for staff under a government contract. Programming was provided under an exclusive confidential contract from TVNZ.

CITV launched on 25 December 1989 (Christmas Day). The government in May 1989 had outlined that the channel would open ahead of the end of 1989. The Christmas Day launch was seen with opposition from the Religious Advisory Council, who thought the introduction of the service would detract from the essence of Christmas, especially being a family day. Plans to introduce it in the new year were suggested, but ultimately CIBC launched it on Christmas Day as planned. The opening speech featured CITV's intention to make it a tool of nation building, under the "one people - one nation" philosophy. To fund the service a 2% increase on personal income tax was put to place. This was later revised to 1% in order to prepare for the 1992 Pacific Festival of the Arts. This caused the Cook Islands Broadcasting Corporation to use only half of what it had planned for development.

Since the government assured that all Cook Islander citizens were levied with the increase, the plan was to make the television service available in the whole archipelago. The first phase involved Rarotonga, the capital island. In 1990, the service expanded to Aitutaki, the second most-populated island. In the third phase in 1992 the service was made available to Mauke and Manihiki. As of 1993 the final phase of the project was still on the cards, by bringing the service to the remaining islands: Atiu, Mitiaro, Mangaia, Penrhyn and Pukapuka. This fourth and final phase was set to be completed by year-end 1993. Since launch, CITV was a commercial service; its introduction caused an increase in Coca-Cola sales in Rarotonga and brought forth a consumerist mindset to the islands.

Formerly a government-owned entity alongside radio counterpart CIBC, it was privatised in 1996. Both companies were acquired by Elijah Communications in April 1997, as CITV had been operating at a loss in the previous year, as its privatisation hampered efforts to reach out to the outer islands. George Pitt had taken over control in 2001 through Pitt Media Group; with the acquisition, he put it in line with his other interests, Radio Cook Islands and Rarotonga's only magazine.

By 2003, CITV started at 3pm and was still the only television network in the country. There was a threat to shut down power to one of its transmitters in November 2005, but this was lifted.

In August 2010, Isaiah Narayan of Fijian commercial station Mai TV visited CITV to install a new fully-automated programming system. Negotiations went underway in September 2011 with China Central Television to relay one of its international channels. CITV staff, along with one member from two outer island stations (Luke Mataera from Aitutaki TV and Januet Ruatoa from Mangaia TV) took part in a PACMAS TV production workshop in March 2012.

As of 2019, NZ$49,500 out of its NZ$50,000 bill was used by advertising from local businesses.

In 2024, journalists from the station were trained at The Digital News Academy, alongside the Cook Islands Herald.

== Transmission ==
Cook Islands Television transmitters in Rarotonga in 1993
Location	Channel	Power
CITV studio (main transmitter)	2	1W
Rarotonga International Airport	4	50W
Tupapa–Maraerenga	10	50W
Matavera	6	50W
Ngatangiia	11	50W
Titikaveka	7	50W
Rarotonga	9	50W
Works Depot	5	50W
Hospital	11	1W

Islands outside of Rarotonga had set up their own CITV stations, in line with the plan to make television available in all of the Cook Islands. The Aitutaki service started in 1990 broadcasting on channel 9 with a transposer relaying it on channel 5 with the power of 5 watts. The transmitter in Mauke was carrying the signal on channel 5 with the power of 10 watts and the one in Manihiki on channel 9 with the power of 10 watts. The transmitters in the remaining islands were under construction by the then-Telecom Cook Islands. Satellite broadcasting was out of question due to high costs. Because some islands didn't have daily flights, some tapes arrived at the outer island stations with a delay of up to a week.

Broadcasts to Pukapuka Atoll were suspended with the economic reforms on 1996; however on 5 September 2000, they were restored, following the installation of a 5-kVa generator. On reopening night, local viewers saw videotaped performances of Mana Productions' Te Maire Maeva Nui. Negotiations were open for the carriage of Rarotongan and overseas material, especially wrestling, sports and news.

Its satellite dish is located in a farm area; sometimes animals roam around it.

== Programming ==
Since the beginning, TVNZ has been a crucial part in its development, providing programming as part of its Pacific Service (now Pasifika TV). In 1990, CITV broadcast daily from 5 to 11 pm.

A typical weekday in 1990 consisted of the following programmes:

- 5:00pm − pre-school programmes such as Sesame Street and Play School
- 6:00pm − Karioi (Raro Mix), featuring local and international music videos
- 7:00pm − Sale of the Century New Zealand
- 7:30pm − Te Ronge Veka (first half in English, second half in Cook Islands Māori)
- 8:00pm − One Network News (via satellite)
- 8:30pm - sitcoms such as The Cosby Show, Who's The Boss? and Yes Minister
- 9:00pm − varied imported output: Matlock, Jake and the Fatman, China Beach, Beyond 2000, etc.
- 10:00pm − repeat of the 7:30pm−8:30pm news hour
- 11:00pm − closedown

On Fridays, the station ended later as it aired feature films at 10pm. Weekends had a similar schedule, but without Te Ronga Veka or Karioi, though with a two-hour local sports block, as well as international documentaries. Sundays featured religious programs pertaining to both the Apostolic Church (using its own studio) and the Bahá'i Faith (using leased equipment). These two were independent productions. There was also talk of adding Tagata Pasifika into the schedule.

In 1992, the station was carrying a cultural interest programme, Karioi.

Early attempts to add further sources of programming were often blocked at TVNZ's insistence. As early as 1993, CITV planned to add programmes from TV3 at a lower rate. Following this episode and TV3's rejection, 95% of all acquired programming seen on CITV had to be acquired through TVNZ.

In 1993, CITV produced 14% of its output, one of the highest proportions out of a television station in the Pacific islands. The CIBC goal in 1994 was to aim for 20%. At the time, the channel broadcast a half-hour bilingual news programme, Te Ronge Vega, which was presented in both Cook Islands Māori and English languages, and was broadcast at 7:30pm on weeknights. In Aitutaki, programming was recorded off-air from Rarotonga and flown to the island for broadcast in the following day. In the other outer islands, CITV produced a compilation tape of local and international news reports. By early 1994, CITV broadcast from 5pm to 10pm, programmes reportedly included Sesame Street, the New Zealand version of Wheel of Fortune and Kwicky Koala.

CITV wanted to air CNN International at least once or twice a day in the mid-90s, but the price to pay for the relays turned out to be larger than the total service cost for the station's staff, equipment and programme renting.

CITV also had a policy regarding pirated content, especially movies. However, George Pitt, its manager in 2002, would only air such movies until they were released in video stores. He also said that there was no "political will" against these airings, as voters preferred to watch movies on television.

In late 2003, the station opened at 3pm with content for children; after which it aired news from Australia's ABC at 6:15pm, CITV's news in English and Cook Islands Māori at 7pm and then a live feed of One News at Six at 7:30pm. Primetime programming included satellite-fed New Zealand relays of popular American series, such as Friends, CSI and 24, often one season behind the original airing, as well as reruns of Seinfeld. At the time, popular New Zealand soap Shortland Street was in rights limbo to the Cook Islands, apparently due to rights disputes between TVNZ and Fiji TV, who were also disputing regional rights for rugby broadcasts. Before the Australian news, it aired the CBS Evening News without commercials, using the satellite beam for New Zealand. Negotiations were underway to broadcast Survivor: Cook Islands locally in September 2006; CITV would also send copies of the programme to stations in remote islands. Just ahead of the 2011 Rugby World Cup, it sealed an agreement with Fiji Television's subsidiary Sky Pacific to air all 48 matches; ten of these had to be rescheduled due to conflicts with live programming.

CITV is a longtime member of Pasifika TV; it became a charter member of the New Zealand programme supply service in September 2015. In September 2024, its output was complemented by that of PacificAus TV. One Stuff article in October 2019 lauded the fact that the channel broadcast the 2019 Rugby World Cup free-to-air, accompanied by local sponsors.
