= Mangaia Television =

Television station in the Cook Islands

- Country: Cook Islands
- Broadcast area: New Zealand
- Headquarters: Mangaia, Cook Islands

Programming
- Picture format: 1080i (HDTV)

Ownership
- Owner: Anthony Whyte

History
- Launched: 2001; 25 years ago

Mangaia Television is the only television station in the island of Mangaia, the southernmost of the Cook Islands. Founded in 2001 by Australian-born Anthony Whyte, who is also its manager, the station produces some of its own programmes, as well as relaying content from Pasifika TV and Cook Islands Television (CITV) productions. It is the island's only media outlet and is run by volunteers.

== History ==
Anthony Whyte, an Australian electrician, arrived in Mangaia in 1998, at a time when there was virtually no money circulating there, infrastructure was getting outdated and electricity supply ended at midnight. Following the September 11 attacks, he felt the urgency of creating a television station for the island, which, up until then, lacked any proper television signals. Using equipment obtained from across the Cook Islands, he built his own television station from scratch.

In 2008, the station carried live coverage of the 2008 Summer Olympics relayed from TVNZ's Pacific Service (now Pasifika TV), which was shared with CITV from Rarotonga. A new round of equipment was delivered in 2022 when Pasifika TV sent mobile journalism kits to several Pacific stations.

As of 2025, Whyte is still in charge of the station, editing reports for the local news, which are also sent to the main CITV station in Rarotonga. Pasifika TV also installed a satellite dish in order to receive its programmes on the local station, which are complemented by local productions and CITV's productions.
