= Water rat =

Water rat(s) may refer to:

== Animals ==
Water rat is a common name for a number of not closely related types of semiaquatic rodents of superfamily Muroidea, including:

- Ucayali water rat or amphibious rat (Amphinectomys savamis), a cricetid found in Peru
- European water vole (Arvicola amphibius, formerly A. terrestris), a cricetid in north and central Europe and Russia
- Baiyankamys, a murid genus of two species from New Guinea
- African wading rat (Colomys goslingi), also called African water rat
- Earless water rat (Crossomys moncktoni), a murid of eastern New Guinea
- Hydromys, a murid genus of four species of Australia and New Guinea
- Nectomys, a cricetid genus of five species of South America
- Florida water rat or round-tailed muskrat (Neofiber alleni), a cricetid in the United States
- Sulawesi water rat (Waiomys mamasae), a murid of Sulawesi
- False water rat (Xeromys myoides), a murid of northern Australia and southern New Guinea

== Other ==
- Water Rats (TV series), an Australian police procedural drama originally airing from 1996 to 2001 and focusing on the Sydney Water Police
- The Grand Order of Water Rats, an entertainment industry charity based in London, England
- Water Rat (Chinese Zodiac), the 49th combination of the sexagenary cycle
- The nickname of the 3rd Canadian Infantry Division
- Ratty (water vole), a character in the novel The Wind in the Willows
- De Walrot, Zaanstreek, a windmill moved to IJlst, Friesland in 1828
- Monto Water Rats, a music venue in London
