= TVWan =

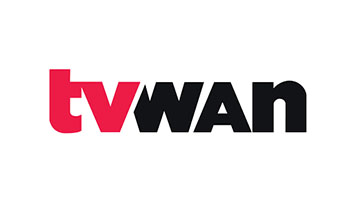
Television Wan (TVWAN) is Papua New Guinea’s newest digital free-to-view TV network with nationwide coverage

Television Wan is Papua New Guinea's newest digital free-to-view TV network with nationwide coverage. It is fully funded and owned by Digicel PNG on their new platform Digicel Play.

It was launched on 14 November 2014.

In April 2016, when Digicel acquired Sky Pacific, TVWan was added as one of the 2 new stations alongside TVWan Sports.

Apart from TVWan, it also runs 4 other channels on Digicel Play, TVWan Sports, TVWan Action, TVWan Life and TVWan Rugby recently renamed in TVWan Sports 1 to 4.

On September 11, 2023, Digicel Group filed for Chapter 15 bankruptcy in the United States Bankruptcy Court for the Southern District of New York.
