= TV3 Samoa =

Samoan television channel

- Country: Samoa
- Broadcast area: Samoa; Worldwide (via subscription)
- Headquarters: Apia, Samoa

Programming
- Picture format: 1080i (HDTV)

Ownership
- Owner: Apia Broadcasting Corporation

History
- Launched: 25 May 2006; 20 years ago

Links
- Website: https://www.tv3samoa.net

TV3 Samoa is a Samoan television station founded in 2006. The station is owned by the Apia Broadcasting Corporation. The channel is available online and on subscription television in Samoa and is also in the Cook Islands via Vodafone Cook Islands' MoanaTV platform.

== History ==
The channel started broadcasting in May 2006 covering 60% of Samoa, but planned to increase the reach to 95% and a second channel relaying the Mormon channel BYUtv.

Hans Joachim Keil, who underwent surgery overseas since August 2017, sold Apia Broadcasting to Maposua Corey Keil and Nicholas Caffarelli on April 6, 2018. The move made TV3 a sister station to Maposua's existing Radio Polynesia.

In 2023, the channel received funding from Pasifika TV's Pasifika On Air for two series, the two-part Pese Samoa half-hour documentaries on Samoan music and Project Climate on the effects of climate change on Samoa. These two aired on Pasifika's member channels on July 20. Its facilities were partly destroyed on September 13, 2023, owing to a lit end of cigarette butt. As consequence, the channel moved to back-up offices in Vaitele.

In May 2024, RNZ reported that TV3 had moved its station completely online since it was unable to afford to broadcast traditionally, coupled by the high number of channels in such a small market like Samoa. In the next month, however, it had reverted its decision and resumed terrestrial broadcasts. At the time, it had a staff of 18. As of midnight on 15 January 2026, per a post on TV3's Facebook account, it announced that it would shut down its terrestrial signal again, being limited to its Twitch stream, as well as on pay television operators Moana TV (Vodafone Samoa) and DTV (Digicel).
