= Mass media in Kiribati =

Kiribati is a developing island nation consisting in 32 atolls and one raised coral island (Banaba) scattered over some 3.5 million square kilometres in the central Pacific. There is access to national media throughout the country.

There are both state-owned and private newspapers and radio stations. Former President Ieremia Tabai privately owns both a newspaper and a short-range radio station. Locally produced television is in its infancy, and inoperative as of March 2013.

The mass media in Kiribati have consistently been ranked as "free" by Freedom House.

== Radio ==
Radio Kiribati, the state radio operating under the Broadcasting and Publications Authority, "is the only station that broadcasts across the country" and is accessible on all islands. It operates on a frequency of 1440 kHz. Despite being state-owned, it broadcasts news items critical of the government, and has sometimes been accused of irresponsible reporting by government members. In March 2011, a Taiwanese grant enabled Radio Kiribati to have national coverage.

Newair FM 101 is a private radio station. It is owned by former President Ieremia Tabai, and "covers only Tarawa", the capital.

In addition to these two local stations, "BBC World Service is available around the clock", and Radio Australia broadcasts are also received in the country.

== Press ==
see also: List of newspapers in Kiribati

Published every Tuesday and Friday, Uekera is the state-owned newspaper, and -as of 2006- had a circulation of about 1,500 per week, around the country. The Kiribati New Star is a private weekly owned by Ieremia Tabai; another private weekly is the Kiribati Times. The Fishermen’s Association operates a weekly newspaper, Tarakai.

The privately owned Kiribati Independent "is printed fortnightly with a circulation of 500", primarily in the capital (South Tarawa). It also operates a website, accessible to the roughly 8,000 internet users in the country.

In addition, "newsletters from the Catholic and Protestant churches provide alternative sources of information".

Altogether, these papers "offer diverse viewpoints", and I-Kiribati people tend to be "avid consumers of news stories" about national politics. However, not all newspapers reach the outer islands, and those that do are generally "a week to ten days late", due to infrequent transport between the vastly scattered atolls. In addition, Jon Fraenkel noted in 2006 for the United Nations Development Programme that journalists "are often young, poorly paid and inexperienced, and the same stories often circulate in the various different publications".

== Television ==
Television Kiribati was the sole, state-owned television service. Established in 2002, it broadcast "local and foreign programmes", and was accessible only in South Tarawa and in the neighbouring island-town of Betio. It provided "about one hour of local programming" on weekdays, and did not broadcast over week-ends. It was suspended by the government in March 2013, due to "serious financial problems", and its personnel's "lack [of] expertise and knowledge in programming and production". The government announced a review to determine whether the closure should be permanent.

However, as of 2017 despite the lack of locally produced content, "multi-channel TV packages provide access to Australian and US stations".
