= Mobile reporting =

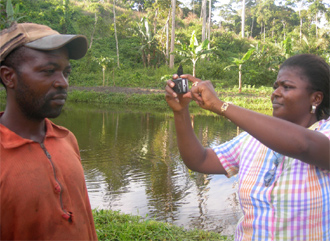
Mobile reporting

Mobile reporting is a trend emerging in the field of news and content generation. The term describes the use of a mobile phone as a reporting tool. The user creates text, photo and video that combined produces a multimedia based report. The content is edited on the phone before being uploaded to the internet via mobile network or Internet connection. Usually mobile reporting is used for publishing to the web. This is particularly the case with video as the technology does not yet allow for the production of high end video. However, the low quality is suitable for Internet.

Mobile reporting is particularly relevant in areas that lack modern Internet infrastructure (Sub Sahara Africa, Central Asia, South America, Latin America). The mobile phone is low in cost when compared to more traditional reporting equipment.

== Commercial uses ==
Specifically, mobile field reporting may also refer to enabling employees and staff, and first responders (police, fire, EMS) to access their networks and resources in a secure and timely manner using various public or proprietary mobile devices and applications.

== Advantages of using the mobile phone ==
- Ability to capture text, photo and video
- Ability to capture audio
- Ability to livestream audio and video content
- First level editing functions
- Connection to mobile network and Internet
- Small and easy to use

== Technology ==
Mobile Reporting makes use of a content repurposing platform. This is a platform that supports services that let content owners and users create, share and publish multimedia content whenever and wherever, regardless of format or device. A mobile reporting platform takes care of the compatibility between the originating and target device.
