= Kacific Broadband Satellites =

Pacific Island satellite operator

Kacific Broadband Satellites Group
- Type: Private
- Industry: Telecommunications
- Founded: 2013
- Founder: Christian Patouraux
- Headquarters: Singapore, Singapore
- Number of employees: 92 (2022)
- Website: kacific.com

Kacific Broadband Satellites Group (Kacific) is a satellite operator providing a high-speed broadband internet service for the South East Asia and Pacific Islands regions. Its first Ka-band HTS satellite, Kacific1, was designed and built by Boeing and launched into geostationary orbit atop a SpaceX Falcon 9 launch vehicle on 16 December 2019.

== History ==
Kacific is the brainchild of Christian Patouraux, also CEO, who founded the company in 2013. In its first months, to raise capital and develop the business plan, the company attracted Mark Rigolle and Cyril Annarella, who became co-founders. The company is registered in Vanuatu.

In December 2013, Kacific announced its intention to launch Kacific1. This Ka-band high throughput satellite (HTS) placed in geostationary orbit will provide high speed internet to the Pacific region and South East Asia.

Designed and manufactured by Boeing, the Kacific1 HTS satellite is based on the 702 satellite platform. Kacific offers direct internet access, via wholesale channels, to government agencies, institutions, businesses, community groups and households within the satellite's total footprint area following the launch of the satellite in December 2019.

In June 2014, Kacific signed a five-year agreement with Tuvalu Telecommunications Corporation (TTC) to provide high speed internet bandwidth to TTC and the people of Tuvalu. In August of the same year, Solomon Telekom Company Limited (Our Telekom) signed a ten-year agreement with Kacific to deliver high-speed broadband to the people of the Solomon Islands.

In September 2014, Kacific signed a cooperation agreement with the International Telecommunication Union (ITU) for the development of satellite communications capacity and emergency communications solutions for the Pacific region.

In October 2014, Kacific signed a five-year agreement with Telecom Services Kiribati Limited (TSKL) to provide high-speed broadband to the 33 islands and atolls of Kiribati.

In May 2015 Indonesian satellite service provider, BigNet, signed a US$78 million, long-term agreement with Kacific for the provision of high-speed broadband service from 2017.

In June 2016, Kacific began an interim service, providing a high-speed broadband internet connection to the rural Lambubu area on Malekula Island, Vanuatu from a Ku-band satellite.

In February 2017, Kacific announced that The Boeing Company will design and manufacture Kacific1, its first satellite based on the 702 satellite platform. Later that year, Kacific announced SpaceX as the launch provider for Kacific1, using a Falcon 9 two-stage orbit-class rocket.

In September 2018, Kacific selected Kratos Defense & Security Solutions, Inc. to manufacture and install its teleport radio-frequency equipment.

In November 2019, Kacific confirmed its agreement with global digital infrastructure provider, Tata Communications, to provide global internet and cyber security services for Kacific's Ka-band satellite network.

In December 2019, Kacific confirmed that it had secured credit facilities totaling US$160 million with a group of financial institutions including the Asian Development Bank (ADB) and GuarantCo.

On 16 December 2019, the company's first Ka-band HTS satellite, Kacific1, launched into geostationary orbit atop a SpaceX Falcon 9 launch vehicle from Cape Canaveral, Florida.

== Affiliations and memberships ==
Kacific is member of the Pacific Telecommunications Council (PTC), Member of the Pacific Islands Telecommunication Association (PITA), a member of the Global VSAT Forum (GVF), and an affiliate member of the Asia-Pacific Tele-community (APT).

== Awards ==
Cooperation of the Year Award 2022 – SIG Awards.

Outstanding Satellite Operator of the Year 2022 – PTC Awards.

Outstanding Support for PTC's Vision & Mission 2022 – PTC Awards.

CEO of the Year for Wholesale & Capacity (Operator) 2021 – Telecom Review.

Project of the Year – Satellite 2021 – Global Carrier Awards.

Business as a Force for Good Award 2021 - INSEAD Alumni Association.

Newcomer Satcom Operator Award 2020 - Euroconsult.

Satellite Executive of the Year 2019: Christian Patouraux – Asia-Pacific Satellite Communications Council (APSCC).

Best Digital Inclusion 2019 – Pacific ICT Awards.

Better Satellite World Award 2018 – Space & Satellite Professionals International (SSPI).

Best Potential in Asia 2015 – France Singapore ICT Awards.

== Coverage ==
The Kacific1 satellite uses spot beams to place capacity over regions within Asia Pacific. Countries with areas under spot beam coverage include: American Samoa, Bhutan, Brunei, Cook Islands, East Timor, Fiji, French Polynesia, Guam, Indonesia, Kiribati, Malaysia, Micronesia, Myanmar, Nepal, New Zealand, Niue, Northern Mariana, Papua New Guinea, Philippines, Samoa, Solomon Islands, Tonga, Tuvalu, Vanuatu.
