= Vini TV =

Satellite and IPTV subscription television operator in French Polynesia

Vini TV is the name of a satellite and IPTV subscription television operator in French Polynesia, created in 2000 under the auspices of TPS and currently owned by the OPT Group. Since its beginning, it operated services by satellite using Intelsat 701, but starting in 2018, it began offering the same service on fiber, using the Vinibox decoders.

== History ==
The French Polynesian pay-TV market began on 22 December 1994 with the local launch of Canal+ followed by Téléfénua (put into liquidation and closed in 2003), an MMDS operator, on 6 May 1995.

The satellite operator Tahiti Nui Satellite began its operations under OPT jurisdiction on 29 June 2000. In September, it made its commercial launch using the Intelsat 701 satellite, with uplinking from Globecast. The launch offer featured several mainland French channels, mostly owned by TPS (Teletoon, Infosport, Odyssée, LCI, M6 Music, M6, Cinéstar 1, Cinéfaz, Sérieclub, Cinétoile) as well as two local channels (Matavision and Tahiti Nui TV and radio stations Radio Nostalgie, Rire et Chansons and Europe 2. Channels were uplinked from the Sylmar earth station to Intelsat 701. The two RFO channels (Télé Polynésie and Tempo) were being tested in January 2002. In July that year, a contract was signed with Telecom Cook Islands to provide its satellite service to remote islands of the Cook Islands. TNS would have to carry three channels in English: Cartoon Network, TCM and CNN.

The provider began preparing its HD service in the third quarter of 2009 with a supply agreement from Thomson.

In June 2012, TNS added the OCS package during its overseas launch. TNS moved from MPEG-2 to MPEG-4 on the early hours of 4 June that year. Plans to include an educational channel in English were in an initial stage, with a launch planned for the second half of 2013; the operator also planned to add channels from the wider Pacific region. In line with these changes, it added a total of eighteen new channels and lured subscribers dissatisfied with Canal+ Polynésie's unsatisfactory cost-quality relations.

On 1 February 2024, TF1 and M6 were moved to the Canal+ Polynésie offer, which operates by arrangement with Vini.
