= Caledonia (TV channel) =

- Country: New Caledonia, France
- Headquarters: Koné, New Caledonia

Programming
- Language: French
- Picture format: 576i SDTV

Ownership
- Owner: Caledonia

History
- Launched: 9 December 2013; 12 years ago
- Former names: NCtv (2013–2017)

Links
- Website: caledonia.nc

Availability

Terrestrial
- TNT: Channel 10

Caledonia is a private television channel in the French overseas collectivity of New Caledonia. Most of its programming consists of news and public affairs programs it makes.

== History ==
CSA approved the creation of NCtv and NC9 on 22 January 2023. NCtv started broadcasting on 9 December 2013, becoming the first private television station in the collectivity. The project was based in the North province, meaning that the station is headquartered in Koné. It requested two licenses for the two slots granted by the French regulator CSA for private licenses, the other being another channel called NC9, but as of the time of NCtv's launch, the NC9 project was delayed. Most of its staff was young and had little experience in television before, but was engaged in making efforts at meeting 50% local programming, per CSA's demands. A two-hour block of its launch programming was live, including news and discussion programs. Four 26-minute magazines concerning environment, history, science and the sea were also made, while the rest of the line-up was from abroad. During 2016, new programs were introduced.

On 4 May 2017 at 6pm, the channel was renamed Caledonia, and simultaneously unveiled its new studio and programs, beginning with its relaunched news service. A total of eleven new programs were unveiled. The rename was urged because there were concerns that NCtv would lead to confusions with Nouvelle-Calédonie La Première, as well as its new schedule being 100% Caledonian, with the aim of becoming a national media outlet. Its logo was designed to be recognizable on the quick fast: the uppercase letter C, with stripes representing local cultural elements, with the new channel name in the middle. A pilot newscast in Kanak languages aired at 6pm on 26 April 2018 and was repeated hourly until 9pm. In 2019, the channel signed agreements with TF1 and M6 to provide their programming and reduce the amount of repeats of its original productions to improve viewer satisfaction. In 2022, the channel's ratings increased. Its newscast, though covering the same items as La Première through its viewpoint, did not compete with its equivalent at the public channel, which according to Jaimie Waimo would only happen if it had seven newscasts a week. That year started with an expansion from five bulletins to six. Most of its viewership was now found in the South province.
