= Mobile journalism =

Emerging form of new media storytelling

Mobile journalism is a form of multimedia newsgathering and storytelling that enables journalists to document, edit and share news using small, network connected devices like smartphones. Mobile journalists report in video, audio, photography, and graphics using apps on their portable devices. Such reporters, sometimes known as mojos (for mobile journalist), are staff or freelance journalists who may use digital cameras and camcorders, laptop PCs, smartphones or tablet devices. A broadband wireless connection, satellite phone, or cellular network is then used to transmit the story and imagery for publication. The term mojo has been in use since 2005, originating at the Fort Myers News-Press and then gaining popularity throughout the Gannett newspaper chain in the United States.

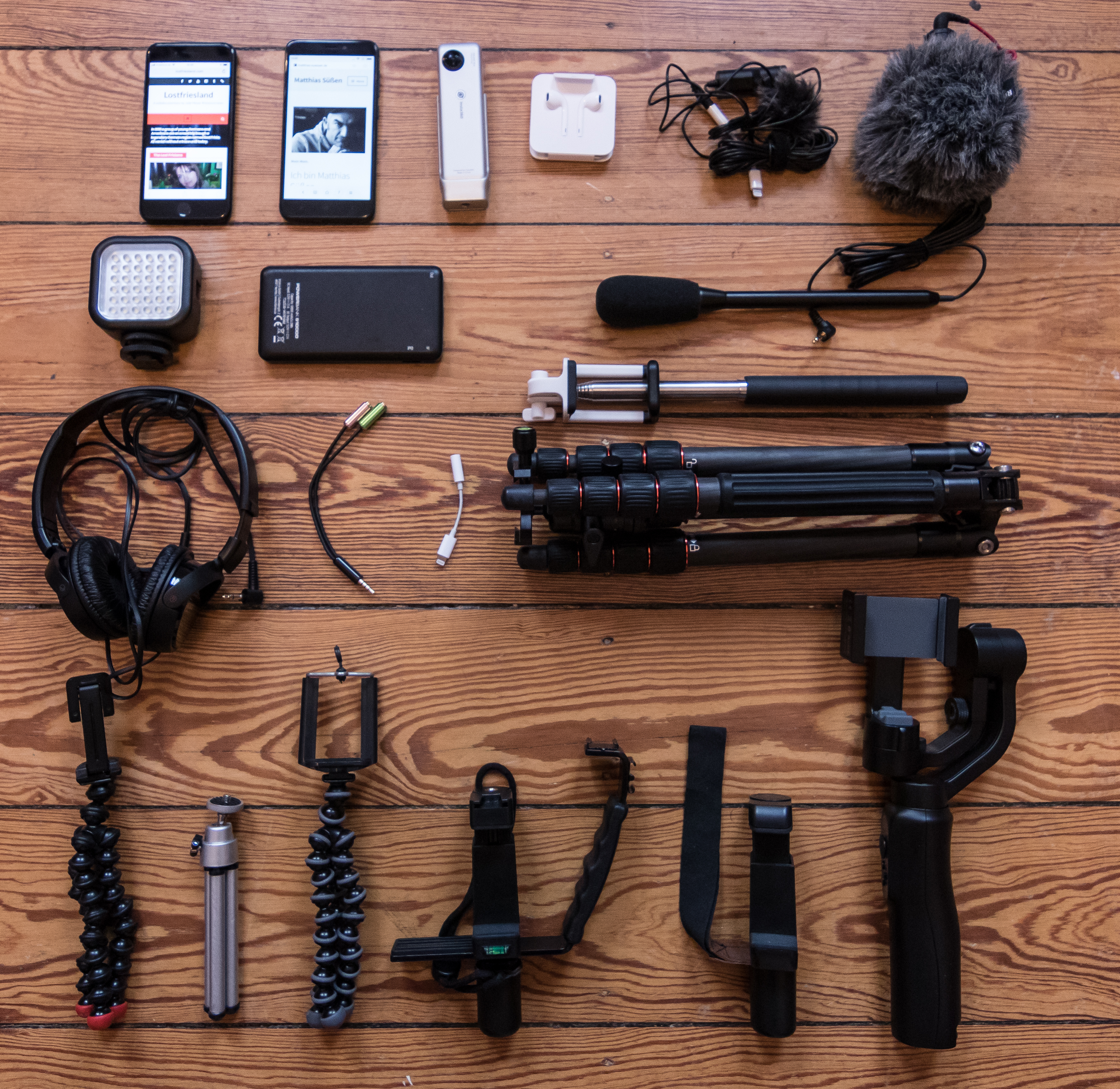
Equipment of a mobile journalist

Some key benefits of mobile journalism in comparison to conventional methods include affordability, portability, discretion, approachability, and the ease of access for beginners.

== Forms of presentation ==
Publishers and newsrooms typically offer at least responsive web design or a dedicated mobile app for mobile devices, allowing readers to access editions of their publication (such as a newspaper) usually at a lower price than print editions. For example, the magazine Der Spiegel has a digital edition focused on multimedia and interactivity. Another example is the app for the ARD news program Tagesschau, which includes streaming functionality for many broadcasts. An Austrian example is the app for the high-circulation free newspaper Heute, which features a citizen reporter function allowing users to upload photos of events they witness directly through the software. These are occasionally used in the print edition, but otherwise published online and made available to other users through the app.

With responsive web design, web pages are adapted to the smaller screen format of mobile devices without offering a dedicated app. The content typically does not differ from what is offered on the standard website.

Some publishers only offer a pure PDF version of their publication. In this case, the interactive possibilities offered by the online world can only be used in a limited way or not at all. For example, there are no usable links or comment functions.

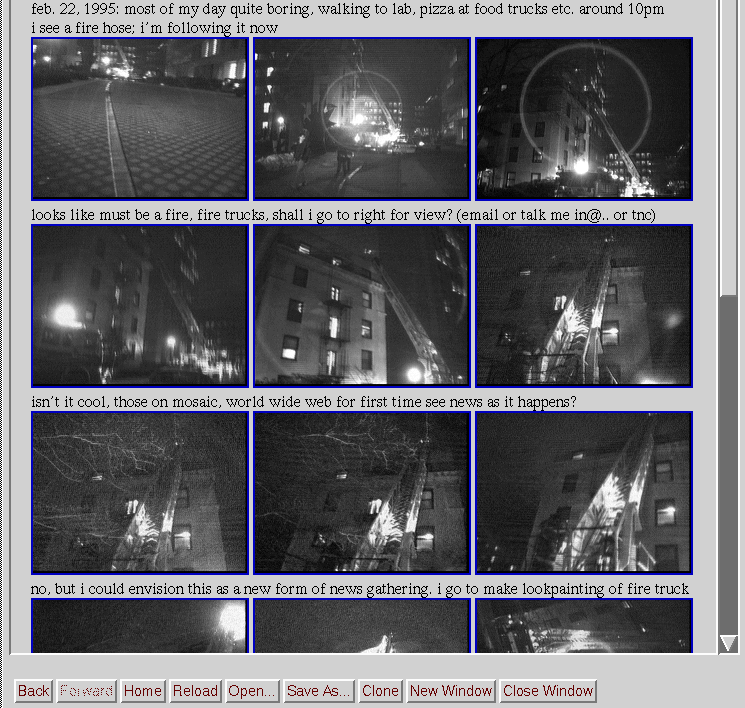
The first documented example of mobile journalism is attributed to technology pioneer Steve Mann. On February 2, 1995, he captured this using a wearable camera of his own design.

== Advantages ==
For creating particularly cross-media journalistic content, smartphone journalism represents a significant reduction in effort and faster response time for journalists. With a smartphone, one can not only easily write and edit texts, but also take photos and videos and publish them immediately.

The number of internet users who own a mobile device and access journalistic content through it represents a growing target audience. The online editions of respective journalistic media are, unlike most online presences generated for PCs, often paid services, though completely free offerings or mixed solutions also exist, where articles are not available in full length, for example.

== Mobile reporting ==
For journalistic work, the term "mobile reporting" has become established in English-speaking countries. In addition to tablet journalism, this also refers to mobile phone journalism, meaning creating a contribution for or with a mobile phone. Occasionally, this type of journalism is also called Journalism 2.0, although this more commonly refers to the mobile use of social media.

== Training ==
The use of mobile devices is becoming increasingly important for journalists. Various universities, journalism schools, and other institutions have incorporated this topic into their curricula. The Academy for Journalism in Hamburg, Nuremberg Institute of Technology, University of Bremen, and the Journalism Academy in Munich offer seminars or modules in this field.

== Literature ==
- Staschen, Björn: Mobiler Journalismus. Wiesbaden, Springer VS, series Journalistic Practice 2016, ISBN 9783658117825
- Wolf, Cornelia: Mobiler Journalismus – Angebote, Produktionsroutinen und redaktionelle Strategien deutscher Print- und Rundfunkredaktionen. Baden-Baden, Nomos, 2014, ISBN 9783848714148

== Use Cases ==
Editors at AJ+, a digital outlet form Al Jazeera, use mobile journalists in their video news coverage.

== See also ==
- Backpack journalism
- Mobile reporting
