= Broadcasting Corporation of Niue =

Niue public broadcaster

- Type: Public
- Industry: Broadcasting
- Founded: 2001; 25 years ago
- Headquarters: Alofi, Niue
- Website: tvniue.com

The Broadcasting Corporation of Niue (BCN), also known as the Niue Broadcasting Corporation, is a government-owned broadcasting corporation in Niue, which operates Television Niue and Radio Sunshine, the country's only television and radio channels. It is based in Alofi. Its general manager and chief editor is Trevor Tiakia.

Following the 2011 general election, a specific cabinet ministry for the corporation was set up. The minister responsible for the BCN was Joan Viliamu.

In 2020, a fire caused extensive damage to a significant portion of the TV and radio station's facilities. For a time afterwards, the organisation operated from the partially burnt headquarters. After five years of functioning in temporary premises and under substandard studio conditions, the Australian Federal Government, with assistance from the ABC International Development team, commissioned the reconstruction of the BCN studios.

In September 2025, a team from New Zealand and Australia, led by Manaia Go, visited BCN in Niue to upgrade the facility. They installed new television and radio broadcast systems, incorporating the latest technology to enable BCN to transmit content through traditional methods as well as various online platforms.

The $2 million project funded by the government of Australia to rebuild the BCN studios destroyed in a fire in 2020 was officially opened on 22 September 2025 by Prime Minister Dalton Tagelagi. The host for the opening ceremony was Australia's High Commissioner to Niue Olivia Phongkam.

== Broadcasting schedule ==
Television Niue is broadcast in Niuean and in English.

Radio Sunshine broadcasts in English and Niuean, over 594 kHz AM and 88.6 MHz FM, from 06:00 to 21:30.
