= Vaka Television =

- Country: Cook Islands
- Headquarters: Avarua, Cook Islands

Programming
- Picture format: 1080i (HDTV)

Ownership
- Owner: Vaka Television

History
- Launched: October 2010; 15 years ago

Links
- Website: https://www.vakatv.com

Vaka Television, better known as Vaka TV, is a private television network in the Cook Islands. As of 2025, it operates a multi-channel network of four channels, which includes channels available for rental to individual groups. The main channel, Vaka TV, is the former analogue service; Vaka TV 2 broadcasts PacificAus TV's output (though it was also reported to air "mystery and history") and Vaka TV 3 is a sports channel.

== History ==
Talk of the second television station in the Cook Islands began in early 2006, costing NZ$500,000 and set to relay programmes from ABC Asia-Pacific and BBC World in an initial phase before starting to produce programmes of its own. The proposed station was owned by Te Digital Factory (owned by Paolo Cattania) and depended on Australian engineers. It is unknown what happened to this station.

A licence was granted to Vaka Television on 17 March 2010, valid for a five-year period. In October, the station started broadcasting, from transmission poles installed at Black Rock, Nikao, Tupapa and Matavera. The station was owned by Dave Reuther and broadcast from Chillis Sports Bar in Tupapa, which he also owned. During an in initial phase, the channel would only carry international programming, with local programming being added only at a later stage. The station suspended its services for a two-week period beginning 2 December 2010, in anticipation for its full launch.

On 16 December 2010, Vaka TV aired a full schedule for the first time, starting regular broadcasts.

In September 2024, Vaka Television started broadcasting programmes from Australian commercial channels upon entering PacificAus TV.

== Transmission ==
Before 2024, Vaka Television broadcast on analogue television in the following frequencies:

Vaka Television analogue transmitters before the analog shutdown
Location	Channel
Chilli's, Tupapa (main transmitter)	8
Avana District	9
Rutaki District	6
Akoa District	4
Nikao Met Office	5
Ooa District	5

As of January 2026, Vaka TV uses three of its four digital channels, however viewers have to donate NZ$25 per month in order to sustain operating costs. The rest of the available spectrum in its multiplex can be rented to individual associations, religious groups and sports teams.

== Programming ==
Just before the analogue signal was shut down in 2024, what was at the time the sole Vaka TV channel opened at 3pm on weekdays and 8:30am on weekends. Weekdays started with an hour of cartoons, then a vast array of US television series (from classics such as Gunsmoke and The Beverly Hillbillies to more recent productions such as Everybody Loves Raymond and Modern Family), as well as the live simulcast of 1News' now-defunct midday edition and a tape-delayed edition of Seven Sharp. Early evening hours were filled with contemporary US fare, followed by a live simulcast of 1News at Six. Vaka TV does not produce a news bulletin of its own, instead airing the local weather report at 8:25pm. After 1News, the prime time schedule is dominated by an American series, followed by a feature film. The schedule ends near midnight with the airing of a television series from a streaming platform (such as Succession or Sex Education, both commissioned for Netflix), though Friday nights end with a horror movie. Weekends started with an extended block of cartoons, while most of the day was occupied by feature films: two classic features after Gunsmoke followed by a family movie on Saturday afternoons, while on Sundays, the 4pm slot was reserved for Tagata Pasifika followed by the Canadian series Heartland before airing the family movie at 5:30pm. After 1News Weekend, the Saturday schedule ended with a horror movie, and the Sunday schedule with a general movie.

It obtained the rights to the 2026 FIFA World Cup ahead of its beginning; the broadcasts are sponsored by the Cook Islands Football Association.
