= Araura TV =

Araura Television
- Country: Cook Islands
- Broadcast area: New Zealand
- Headquarters: Aitutaki, Cook Islands

Programming
- Picture format: 1080i (HDTV)

Ownership
- Owner: Araura TV & Radio

History
- Launched: early 1990s

Araura TV is a television station in Aitutaki (also known as Araura) in the Cook Islands, owned by Araura TV & Radio. Originally it was a government-owned station, but was later suspended before being handed over to private hands. As of 2026, Araura TV provides a fully-digital terrestrial multiplex containing six channels.

== History ==
Araura TV started broadcasting in the early 1990s as a government-funded television station, however, a shortage of funds caused its broadcasts to be suspended in the mid-1990s. This caused the station to be privatised.

Araura TV started delivering its services in the early 2000s; its founder was Michael Henry. In 2002, its programming consisted of a relay of ABC Asia Pacific most of the time, with pirated movies airing during prime time. Movies usually ran incomplete, with the station manager switching to another move if he didn't like it, or returning to the ABC signal. The service featured a single 24/7 channel carrying TCM and relays of TV One programmes, with news sourced off Foxtel channels coming in at a later stage, as well as sporting events from both Aitutaki and abroad, the latter of which were relayed from ESPN. The station sustained itself from money coming in from annual telethons, advertising for equipment power, pay-per-view programmes and other strategies. However, by 2010, the station went off air as a result of Cyclone Pat and viewers were offered two cable systems (SkyTel or TCI-Marama) to continue watching television. A letter from an Aitutaki local to the Cook Islands News urged the reinstatement of the station by that year's Christmas.

The effects of the pandemic in 2020 caused the station to rethink its strategies. In 2021, the Cook Islands ICT SMART Economy Grant announced that Araura TV would convert from an analogue operation to a digital one. The new digital service was set to operate on a four-channel multiplex covering 500 homes and businesses. The SMART funding initially envisioned four channels, but over time would expand to a ten-channel offer. A set of mobile journalism equipment was received in 2022, using funds from Pasifika TV, of which it is a member.

As of January 2026, Araura TV has a six-channel multiplex. It faces lack of technical expertise and funding sources, much like other Pacific broadcasters, and its source of revenue is falling largely due to the move to social media platforms.
