= Samoa Broadcasting Corporation =

Samoan public broadcaster

- Type: Broadcast radio network Television network
- Country: Samoa
- Availability: National
- Owner: Independent State of Samoa
- Key people: Faiesea Lei Sam Matafeo, SBC Chief Executive Officer
- Launch date: 1929; 97 years ago (radio); 1993; 33 years ago (television)
- Former names: Western Samoa Broadcasting Department
- Official website: tv1samoa.tv

The Samoa Broadcasting Corporation (SBC) was a public broadcaster in the South Pacific island country of Samoa. Its operations were based in Mulinuʻu, Apia. SBC was created by an act of Parliament in 2003, replacing the old Western Samoa Broadcasting Department. This government entity include both the former Televise Samoa & Radio 2AP. The SBC broke up in 2008. TV1 Samoa is now the main television station of Samoa. SBC's radio stations still broadcast but are now privately owned. The radio stations were given to Radio Polynesia and the TV station to Samoa Quality Broadcasting, who renamed SBC TV 1 as TV1 Samoa.

== SBC Radio 1 and SBC FM ==
SBC Radio 1 (formerly Radio 2AP), 540AM, broadcasts news, current affairs, talk, information, entertainment, music and audio content in the Samoan language. It can be heard clearly in Niue, Tokelau and emails from Samoans in Alaska say they too get snatches of it. It is the radio station of choice in many American Samoa households as well as Samoa. By the time of its privatization in 2008, the audience consisted mainly of elderly listeners.

After World War II ended, the New Zealand government re-established the station in 1948, by the early 1970s, it was one of the few radio stations in the South Pacific now to have a Western manager.

The SBC Radio 1 complex in Mulinuʻu houses SBC Radio 1's operations, just next door to SBC TV. There is also SBC-FM, 88.1FM, which is an English-language station delivering news, entertainment and music in the English Language. This station is housed inside the SBC TV compound, Mulinuʻu.

== SBC Television 1 ==
SBC television, formerly Televise Samoa, reaches 95% of independent Samoa, getting blocked only by mountains at Uafato, Fagaloa. SBC TV 1 is Samoa's national television station, currently broadcasting from 6 am to midnight. SBC TV 1 usually broadcasts local news and entertainment, plus news from New Zealand's TVNZ 1News and the usual broadcasts from BBC & ABC Australia during the morning and afternoons weekdays. In addition to funding from the Samoan Government, SBC's television programs are also funded by commercials.

=== Programming ===
Programming on SBC doesn't start at the exact times. A list of SBC television & radio schedules can be found in the Samoa Observer or the SBC Print Media, Lali. The content of SBC's programmes are at 45% for local programming while the remaining percentage content from overseas. The television channel broadcasts in both languages, Samoan & English.

- SBC TV 1 Tala Fou - Tala Fou is SBC's half-hour flagship news program which mainly reports on local news, broadcasting in English and Samoan, nightly at about 6:35PM, with Sunday's edition "the week in review" or "Otootooga O Tala Fou".
- O Le Lali - Daily half-hour discussion program in English and Samoan, weekdays at 5:35 pm. Its format is usually deliberated on government notices and vacancies, death announcements and the 'infamous' singing of Happy Birthday wishes by the presenters.
- E Te Silafia? (Did you know?) - Half-hour informational program in Samoan about the different agencies and departments throughout Samoa. Seen weekly on a random night (usually Thursday) at 8 pm.
- Tapuaiga Afiafi - A nightly, 5-10 minute curfew vigil prayer period in Samoa, presented in Samoan. Accented with pictures of Samoa, SBC broadcasts different church denominations each day of the week in observance of this quiet period in Samoa at the normal time of 6 pm. The prayer is broadcast nightly at 6:10 pm, sometimes replaced with a schedule of SBC programmes for the evening.
- Aitinae Samoa - Program on Samoa's agriculture.
- Va'a O Manu - Hour long religious discussion program, seen Sundays at 8 pm.
- Starsearch - Along the same lines as American Idol and sponsored by Coca-Cola, it is SBC's annual contest to see who will be the next big star. A half-hour live program broadcast in English and Samoan, Sundays at 9 pm.
- Golden Star - Similar to Starsearch, but featuring hits from the 1930s to 1960s. Presented when Starsearch is not seen, live Sundays at 9 pm, in English and Samoan.
- SBC Hits - Music video program, presented in association with SBC-FM. Seen at random times.
- Tala O Le Ta'aloga - Samoan sports news magazine; seen Sundays at 5 pm in Samoan and English. Presented live if New Zealand rugby games are scheduled.
- Ata Pu'upu'u - SBC's local archival footage and entertainment program; replays local comedy, old documentaries and other propgrams and material from the SBC archives.
- Faleula - A discussion panel programme discussed by high-ranking chiefs in the different aspects and facts of the Samoan culture or way of life or the Fa'aSamoa.
- Neighbours is an Australian soap opera is on SBC Weekdays at 8:30 pm.
- Islanigo: The Need is a South African soap opera is on SBC at 6:30 pm.
- SBC Kids aired on SBC Mondays to Friday from 8 to 11 pm and Saturday at 9 am to midday and omnibus on Sundays.

== See also ==
- List of television stations in Samoa
