= Sky Pacific =

Fiji based pay TV service

SKY Pacific is a Fiji based pay TV service owned by Digicel (formerly owned by Fiji Television Limited) delivering encrypted signals of 27 channels via direct-to-home (DTH) satellite on C-band to subscribers in Fiji and across the South Pacific. It is headquartered in the capital city of Fiji, Suva City with branch offices in Suva, Lautoka, Nadi and Labasa. On April 1, 2016, Digicel Fiji officially acquired the company.

SKY Pacific currently operates on MPEG-4 platform with its encrypted signals uplinked to Intelsat 19 from its base station in Suva and delivered to households across 13 island countries in the South Pacific including American Samoa, Cook Islands, Fiji, Kiribati (East), Nauru, New Caledonia, Niue, Papua New Guinea, Samoa, Solomon Islands, Tonga and Vanuatu. However, the territories of French Polynesia (Tahiti), the Solomon Islands, Tokelau, Tuvalu and Kiribati (West) were missed out from reaching after SKY Pacific migrated from Intelsat 18 to Intelsat 19 in June 2013.

== History ==
=== Early years as Sky Fiji ===
In 1994, when Fiji One started permanent broadcasts, plans for a pay-TV service were underway. There were going to be two channels, with the first channel carrying a mix of English and Hindi films, while a second channel was allotted for sports. From the beginning, it was separate from the free-to-air channel. The service got the go-ahead on 30 June 1996, as Sky Fiji. Initially, Sky Fiji carried two channels, with a third one being added on 1 August 1999. The three channels were SKY Plus, SKY Entertainment and a relay of Star Sports. SKY Plus aired Cartoon Network in the mornings, feature films (as well as classics sourced from TCM), National Geographic Channel documentaries and sporting events. SKY Entertainment broadcast predominantly Hindi programming sourced from SET Asia and Zee TV and relays of BBC World. Most sports rights were acquired from TVNZ's Pacific Service division, which also served Fiji One.

=== Sky Pacific goes regional ===
In April 2004, Fiji TV announced the launch of Sky Pacific, as a 12-channel Direct-To-Home (DTH) satellite service for Fiji and the Pacific, starting 1 July. The move came days after a company from Fushun signed an agreement with the Labasa Town Council to provide a cable television service for Vanua Levu. Sky Fiji's satellite service was initially intended to target remote areas of Fiji, but was later made regional. Managing director of Samoan private radio company Radio Polynesia Maposua Rudolf Keil and former head of Samoan state TV Leota Uelese Petaia have shown their interests in holding the license for a subscription television company to distribute Sky Pacific in Samoa.

On 21 November 2005, Sky Pacific launched in Tonga, represented by the Tonga Broadcasting Commission. In July 2006, the service launched in Samoa under the license of Lau TV subsidiary Sky Samoana Limited.

The relocation of Sky Pacific to Intelsat-19 would have meant the loss of television in Tuvalu, which was not in the beam of the new satellite. The change was done in July 2013, in MPEG-4 format. All MPEG-2 decoders were discontinued from 30 September 2013.

On 30 July 2014, Sky Pacific announced the removal of nine channels (BBC World, Cartoon Network, Discovery, Nat Geo Wild, Fox Crime, Fox Premium, Star Plus and Star World) with new ones (such as France 24, Zee Premier, SET India, WarnerTV, History and Boomerang), which angered subscribers. The rationale for the removal of some of the channels was later given to be due to distribution issues:

- BBC World News was dropped due to complaints of piracy;
- Discovery Communications did not have the rights to distribute Discovery Home & Health to Papua New Guinea;
- Turner's Toonami catered a different demographic than Cartoon Network;
- Fox Crime and National Geographic were only cleared for Papua New Guinea;
- Fox Movies, Star Plus and Star World had an agreement with another pay-TV company in Papua New Guinea and could not be relayed on Sky Pacific.

In mid-August, the company announced that it would reinstate BBC World News, Star Plus and Nat Geo Wild within weeks, due to customer demand, increasing the number of channels to 27. The line-up change was the primary cause of complaint for the service in the first nine months of 2014 alone, 351 out of 1618, per the Consumer Council of Fiji's statistics.

=== Digicel buy-out ===
In September 2015, Digicel Fiji decided to buy out Sky Pacific for a mere FJD$5.75m but the Fiji Government refused the buy-out due to Digicel not being owned by a local company. In March 2016, Digicel were finally given a 12-year licence to buy and operate Sky Pacific in Fiji provided that Digicel Fiji is barred from placing local advertisements and local content on Sky Pacific. Local content will only be allowed during natural disasters and to remove all the local content from their channels which meant Sky Pacific had to drop 2 channels, The Pacific Channel and Fiji One which Digicel complied with but they were allowed to add one of their own channels in TVWan to the lineup.

Digicel Fiji finally took control of Sky Pacific on April 1, 2016. As a result of the acquisition, Digicel's TVWan and TVWan Sports were added to the service. These two channels replaced Fiji One and Pacific Channel, receiving criticism from Fijian subscribers and from areas without terrestrial TV coverage until the Walesi DTT platform was implemented. The removal of Fiji One was criticized in a 2018 speech by a National Federation Party member in parliament.

Four new channels were introduced in June 2016, those channels being MTV Live, TVWan Life, Boomerang and Fight Sports, replacing MTV Asia, Boomerang, Fox Family Movies and FX. Discovery Channel was reintroduced in July after a two-year absence. The in-house Super Channel, which was produced when it was under Fiji TV's control, was shut down and its content moved to TVWan and TVWan Action.

On September 11, 2023, Digicel Group filed for Chapter 15 bankruptcy in the United States Bankruptcy Court for the Southern District of New York.

== Channels available ==
=== Prepay service ===
- TVWAN

=== Kids ===
- Nickelodeon
- Cartoon Network

=== Documentary ===
- Discovery Channel
- Love Nature
- History (discontinued in 2024)
- Crime & Investigation

=== Entertainment ===
- AXN (Asia)
- WarnerTV
- Lifetime
- Rock entertainment
- Rock Action (added in 2024)
- Rialto
- Paramount
- Food network

=== Sports ===
- TVWAN sports
- TVWAN sports 2 (added in 2023)
- ESPN & ESPN2
- Fight Sports (discontinued in 2023)
- Premier League TV

=== Indian ===
- Colors
- Sony Entertainment Television
- Star Plus
- Colors Cineplex
- Zee TV

=== News ===
- CNN International
- CGTN
- BBC News

=== Religious ===
- DayStar

=== Former channels ===
- Fiji One (discontinued 2016)
- Super Channel (shut down 2016; content moved to TVWan channels)

== Overseas affiliates ==
SKY Pacific has distribution deals with agents in several Pacific island countries:

- American Samoa (Samoa Systems Incorporated)
- Cook Islands (SKY Cook Islands Ltd.)
- Nauru (Central Meridian Ltd)
- Niue (Broadcasting Corporation of Niue)
- Samoa (Polylink Telecommunications Ltd)
- Tonga (Tonga Broadcasting Commission)
- Tuvalu (Telecom Tuvalu)
