= TV1 Samoa =

Samoan television channel

- Country: Samoa
- Broadcast area: Samoa; Worldwide (via subscription)
- Headquarters: Apia, Samoa

Programming
- Picture format: 1080i (HDTV)

Ownership
- Owner: Samoa Quality Broadcasting

History
- Launched: 25 December 1992; 33 years ago
- Former names: Televise Samoa (1992-2003); SBC TV One (2003-2008)

Links
- Website: https://www.tv1samoa.com

TV1 Samoa is a privately owned television station in Samoa, founded in 1992 as Televise Samoa, a state broadcaster. The station later merged with Radio 2AP to form the later Samoa Broadcasting Corporation and was privatized in 2008. Its CEO is Galumalemana Faiesea Matafeo.

The channel is also available abroad as a subscription service.

== History ==
=== Televise Samoa ===
Television broadcasts from American Samoa were first received in 1964 from KVZK-TV. Initially, it had six channels, but by 1976 it had reduced to three and planned to donate its surplus black and white transmitters to neighboring Samoa for its first television station. One transmitter was also ordered for Tonga, which only received television in 1983.

In 1991, the Samoa Broadcasting Corporation received support from TVNZ's Pacific Service to provide television test transmissions, even though SBC was facing financial problems at the time. Full television broadcasts only began in May 1993. At the beginning of its operations, it emphasized part of its programming for the environment.

Dependence on TVNZ ended in 1999, when it signed a four-year contract with Australia Television International. The deal involved a satellite dish to relay ATI free of charge on Televise Samoa's frequencies. The New Zealand contract was seen by the prime minister as "a bit expensive". This move also implied the end of its relays of One News, which was popular in Samoa at the time, but would still continue to have a close association with TVNZ. The New Zealand broadcaster was disappointed at the decision.

In late August 2001, Televise Samoa received a donation from JICA to provide new, up-to-date equipment, as the cost of 123,215 Samoan tala. New digital equipment included an Apple Powermac editing suite and Panasonic DV recorders. The upgrades enabled the deadline for compiling the 8pm bulletin to end earlier; it used to end at 4pm, but now the staff worked until 6:30pm.

=== SBC TV One ===
In June 2003, it was reported that Radio 2AP and Televise Samoa were merging to form the Samoa Broadcasting Corporation, in an attempt to make the stations profitable. The channel was renamed SBC TV One on September 8. Over time, local programs such as Lali and the news service Tala Fou would be rebranded. Also on the talks were long-term goals to produce the first local soap operas and improving the quality of local programming. Atanoa Herbert Crichton announced his resignation from SBC in November 2005 and moved to TV3 Samoa, which was still preparing for its launch.

=== TV1 Samoa ===
In 2007, SBC was on the verge of being privatized, and a number of bidders emerged, such as Radio Polynesia and Samoa Quality Broadcasting, the latter of which backed by senior SBC staff and local investors. Eventually Radio Polynesia left the bid leaving Samoa Quality Broadcasting alone by December. SQB would improve the channel's news and current affairs output and would enable viewer opinion to make its services more engaging and interactive. The sale was completed on July 21, 2008, consequently, the channel adopted its current name, TV1 Samoa. Since becoming independent from the state, the station suffered reception problems in villages.

In 2017, the head of news and current affairs at the channel was Renee Kahukura-Iosefa, a former Samoan immigrant from the New Zealand city of Hastings who had previously worked with Māori Television for ten years, where she worked at its newscast Te Kāea and on current affairs program Native Affairs. She moved to Samoa that year for her children to grow up in a predominantly Samoan-speaking environment. The channel observed the tenth anniversary of its privatization in July 2018 with a ball at the Tanoa Tusitala Hotel; at the time, the channel's staff grew from nineteen at the time of the privatization decision to over 40.

On July 25, 2025, Chinese ambassador to Samoa Fei Mingxing visited the station's premises, hoping that the visit would enable the station to improve a positive view of bilateral ties between the countries.

== CGTN relay ==
In 2005, China Central Television installed a relay of what was then known as CCTV-9 International (now CGTN) as part of a Samoa-China trade deal with the then SBC. Samoa Quality Broadcasting is still responsible for the relay. In January 2011, it was reported that a relay of CCTV-9 Documentary was added.
