= TV Niue =

Niuean television channel

- Country: Niue
- Broadcast area: New Zealand
- Headquarters: Alofi, Niue

Programming
- Picture format: 1080i (HDTV)

Ownership
- Owner: Broadcasting Corporation of Niue

History
- Launched: October 1988; 37 years ago

Links
- Website: https://www.tvniue.com

TV Niue is a Niuean television channel owned by the Broadcasting Corporation of Niue. The station was created in 1988 following BCN's takeover of the one-channel Bliss Cablevision cable network that existed for two years and was, in its early years, one of the world's smallest television stations in terms of number of staff. TV Niue is available free-to-air on an otherwise mostly-encrypted terrestrial television service.

== History ==
In 1971, as profiled in Pacific Islands Monthly, Niue had only one television set, and the owner could receive signals coming from Hawaii and American Samoa.

The first attempt at bringing a television service to Niue emerged in 1986, when John Bliss from the U.S. state of Nevada obtained permission from the government to install a cable network fed to each village from a terrestrial antenna located in the capital, Alofi. The subscription service charged an installation fee of NZ$50 for the decoder and NZ$5 for a monthly subscription. Content was relayed from satellite, with relays from the Armed Forces Radio and Television Service relayed off Intelsat as well as pre-taped black-and-white U.S. movies from The Nostalgia Channel. The system used NTSC for recording and PAL for transmission. The service was provided by Bliss Cablevision, which over the course of three years had extended its coverage across the island. The new service broadcast on channel 6.

When the underground cable near Lakepa was near completion, the company was discontinued and its assets were taken over by the government, who with assistance from TVNZ (Television New Zealand), replaced it with a terrestrial service. The service was owned by the newly created BCN. Broadcasts started in October 1988. By October 1989, TV Niue only had four programming staff and one employee. TVNZ's technicians had left the channel in its early weeks, while others were sent to New Zealand or Fiji for technical training. The station had two news bulletins in English, but had plans to introduce programs in Niuean later. The service in Niue was viewed by TVNZ as a prototype for other services in the region, at a time when its service to the Pacific was in its initial stages.

In the early 2000s, Shona Pitt, current owner of Cook Islands Television, was the owner of the station.

Presently BCN is responsible for a digital multiplex network of several relayed channels alongside the local service. Three new channels from Discovery Communications (the present Warner Bros. Discovery) were added in October 2019.

== Programming ==
In its early years, TV Niue received its programming from TVNZ's Pacific Service, who supplied the station with videotapes on a weekly basis. One Network News and sporting events were rebroadcast by satellite.

The channel produces news bulletins in both English and Niuean languages.
