= Fiji One =

- Current TV One logo
- Country: Fiji
- Broadcast area: National
- Headquarters: 78 Brown Street, Suva

Programming
- Languages: English, Hindi, iTaukei
- Picture format: PAL-576i (SDTV 16:9)

Ownership
- Owner: Fiji Television
- Sister channels: Fiji Two; FijiTV Stream (online)

History
- Launched: 15 June 1994; 32 years ago (as Fiji One, regular)

Links
- Website: fijionenews.com.fj

Availability

Terrestrial
- Analogue: VHF Band (Deuba, Navua, Suva, Nausori, Korovou, Coral Coast, Labasa, Savusavu, Taveuni, Nadi, Lautoka, Yasawa, Mamanuca)
- Digital: UHF Band (Walesi DVB-T2 - Nationally)

Fiji One is a free-to-air television channel run by Fiji Television. It provides coverage throughout Fiji. It is fully funded from revenue generated through commercial advertisements, meaning that programs have commercial breaks.

== History ==
Long before its introduction, Fiji Trading Co. Ltd. of Suva became the first company in Fiji to import and exhibit a television set for demonstrative purposes. Manager Tom French said that, if proper distant reception of television stations from Sydney and Melbourne was received successfully, sales of television sets would become lucrative.

The Fijian government had shown varying levels of deliberation before introducing a television service. It wasn't until the late 1960s when a feasibility study about the future of Fijian radio led to the creation of a possible television station, which would fall under the auspices of the Fiji Broadcasting Commission, with an estimated coverage of 75% of the national population. In 1984, the government set up the Fiji National Video Centre (FNVC) in association with the German Hanns Seidel Foundation. That same year, the government accepted an offer from Kerry Packer's PBL to conduct a feasibility study for a television service in the country, by 1987 at earliest. An agreement was settled between PBL and the Fijian government in August 1986. There already was an October 1987 launch target, with plans to reduce the Nine Network-backed monopoly within five to seven years. Equipment built in Australia, such as an OB van, was scheduled to be delivered by July. 20% of its programming was going to be local.

Following the coups of 1987, PBL suspended its financing to the Fiji Television Corporation, due to the downturn caused to the economy by the effects of the coups. With Fiji experiencing rapid economic recovery in the aftermath, in 1988, new proposals were being set up, and with the government owning a controlling stake in the new company.

In October 1991, the government granted Television New Zealand a temporary license to operate a television service, Fiji One Television, to carry the 1991 Rugby World Cup initially with coverage in Suva with coverage extending to Nausori and Navua its transmitter located in Tamavua in the outskirts of Suva. In December 1991, following positive interest in the Suva area, the coverage area was extended to the whole of the Western Division, with transmitters installed in Tualesia (southeast of Lautoka) and the Sabeto Range providing signals to Lautoka, Nadi and their surrounding areas.

Eyeing for the creation of a permanent service, the government and TVNZ signed a Memorandum of Understanding. When the company was scheduled to go permanent, TVNZ would manage the service and use the resources of the FNVC using the existing Fiji One service. TVNZ was only involved in the service on a "contractual basis", providing operational and managerial expertise until Fiji TV was set to become self-sustaining, which according to TVNZ, would take five years.

Fiji One started permanent broadcasts in July 1994, with an exclusive 12-year contract to operate, however the monopoly would likely break around its eighth year of operation. On 20 March 1995, it began broadcasting Fiji One News, replacing the FNVC's News Focus. Its coverage reached the Coral Coast, Taveuni and Northern Lau by 1999, reaching out to 85% of the population.

With the launch of Walesi in 2016, the channel was granted the right to operate on channel 2.

== See also ==
- List of newspapers in Fiji
- List of newspapers in Australia
