= Vodafone Cook Islands =

Cook Islands telecommunications company

- Formerly: Telecom Cook Islands (1991-2015); Bluesky Cook Islands (2015-2019)
- Type: Subsidiary
- Industry: Telecommunications
- Founded: July 1991; 35 years ago as Telecom Cook Islands
- Founder: Telecom New Zealand; Government of the Cook Islands
- Headquarters: Avarua, Cook Islands
- Area served: Cook Islands
- Products: Mobile and fixed telephony, XDSL, FTTX and FWA communications, Internet, IPTV
- Brands: MoanaTV (pay-TV)
- Owner: Amalgamated Telecom Holdings
- Website: www.vodafone.co.ck

Vodafone Cook Islands is the sole provider of telecommunications in the Cook Islands. Established in 1991 as a joint between Telecom New Zealand and the Government of the Cook Islands known as Telecom Cook Islands, it was sold in 2015 to Teleraro Limited, and later, in 2019, to Amalgamated Telecom Holdings, which uses the Vodafone branding by special arrangement with British company Vodafone plc. Vodafone provides landline and mobile telephone, internet, and pay television services to its subscribers.

== History ==
Telecom Cook Islands was created in July 1991. At launching time, it was a joint-venture between Telecom New Zealand, which owned 40%, and the government, which owned 60%. TCI announced the installation of a mobile telephony network, with equipment provided from American company Comnet RSI, worth approximately NZ$1 million. The company had revenues of around NZ$10 million. In July 1997, Telecom New Zealand paid NZ$3 million to raise its stake from 40% to 60%. This gave the New Zealand company effective management of the Cook Islands operator, at a time the country was facing economic uncertainties.

On 21 August 2000, TCI informed the prime minister that a satellite station was planned for the island of Nassau, enabling locals to make phone calls to outside the island for the first time. In June 2001, it became the first operator to join Intelsat's Demand Assignment Multiple Access (DAMA) service providing 64 kbit/s internet access between Aitutaki and Avarua. The Nassau satellite earth station was announced in May 2002, service was expected to start by the end of the year; on 3 July that year, it signed a commercial agreement with Tahiti Nui Satellite (of French Polynesian telecom operator OPT) to carry three English-language channels from Turner, CNN International, TCM and Cartoon Network, with the service available to locals from August. Tests were being conducted in all islands except Pukapuka and Nassau. The company suggested it to be a cheaper alternative to video rental, especially pirated videotapes, as well as providing a basic television service to the outer islands, which had few - if any - television services. TCI supplied the English-language channels, the rest of TNS was mostly in French.

A wave of spam e-mails led to a massive system crash in May 2003. E-mails were lost for the first time and some businesses were disrupted. In December that year, interWAVE deployed a GSM network, justifying the need because of tourism, giving the company the ability of delivering international roaming. The company had previously installed such network in other parts of the Pacific and in the Cocos (Keeling) Islands, an Australian dependency in the Indian Ocean.

In February 2015, Spark sold its 60% interest for approximately NZ$23 million (US$17.3 million) to Teleraro Limited, which was 75% owned by Bluesky Samoa, the former Samoatel. In 2019 Amalgamated Telecom Holdings (ATH) of Fiji bought a controlling stake in the Bluesky group, which gives ATH control of Telecom Cook Islands. Since 15 January 2020, it uses the Vodafone brand.

== MoanaTV ==
MoanaTV's services for the Cook Islands are managed by sister ATH operation Vodafone Samoa. The main IPTV head-end is located there and is delivered to the Cook Islands at no entry cost. It arrives into Rarotonga through the Manatua Cable, which is then extended to the local broadband network. The service is also available in Aitutaki, through the internet cable coming in from Rarotonga. As of 2021, 40% of Aitutaki was subscribed to it.
