= Fiji Television =

Television network

Fiji Television Limited
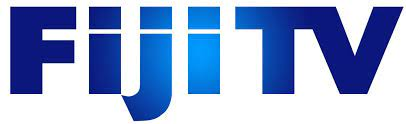
- Country: Fiji
- Broadcast area: Fiji
- Headquarters: 78 Brown Street, Suva

Programming
- Languages: English; Fijian; Fiji Hindi
- Picture format: 576i 16:9

Ownership
- Owner: Public company

History
- Launched: 15 June 1994; 31 years ago

Fiji Television Limited is one of Fiji's main television networks. It was founded on 15 June 1994 as the first permanent commercial television broadcasting network in the country, although television had previously been introduced temporarily in October 1991 to broadcast the Rugby World Cup as well as the Cricket World Cup. This was reviewed and reissued in 2000 for a term of 12 years. Fiji TV was listed as a public company in 1996 on the Suva Stock Exchange, now known as the South Pacific Stock Exchange.

Fiji TV owns Fiji's premier free-to-view channel (FTA) Fiji One, and formerly the pay TV service, Sky Pacific, which was acquired by Digicel in 2016. Fiji TV also owned subsidiary company Media Niugini Limited, which operates Papua New Guinea's only commercial free-to-view channel, EM TV, but later sold it off to the Papua New Guinea Government-owned Telikom PNG Limited in 2016.

TVNZ sold its 5% share in December 1999.

Fiji TV's main shareholders are Fijian Holding Limited (FHL) Media Limited, Hari Punja and Sons Limited, FHL Trustees Limited, FHL Holdings Unit Trust, ITaukei Affairs Board, Capital Insurance Limited, and Fiji National Provident Fund.

Following the passage of the Media Industry Development Decree 2010 by the military regime, Hari Punja resigned from the board of Fiji Television. After the sale of Sky Pacific to Digicel, the company limited its operations to Fiji One, Sky Pacific and the then-upcoming Fiji Two, created for the Walesi platform.
