= Timeline of the introduction of television in countries =

A map showing when television was introduced in each country: 1920s to 1930s 1940s 1950s 1960s 1970s 1980s 1990s 2000s to 2010s 2020s and after No television No data

This is a list of when the first publicly announced television broadcasts occurred in the mentioned countries. Non-public field tests and closed circuit demonstrations are not included.

This list should not be interpreted to mean the whole of a country had television service by the specified date. For example, the United States, the United Kingdom, Germany, and the former Soviet Union all had operational television stations and a limited number of viewers by 1939. Very few cities in each country had television service. Television broadcasts were not yet available in most places.

== History ==
=== 1920s and 1930s ===
Year	Countries and territories	
Year	Regular	Pre-regular
1924		United States (pre-experimental on television)
1928		United States (mechanical television, – W2XCW)
1929		United Kingdom (mechanical); Germany (mechanical); Australia (mechanical, after hours on two existing Melbourne radio stations - 3UZ and 3DB); Netherlands (mechanical, in Scheveningen)
1930		Soviet Union (pre-experimental in Moscow wired in 1929)
1931		France (mechanical); Canada (mechanical, – VE9EC); Soviet Union (mechanical, – МТЦ); Siam (mechanical, cancelled because of the revolution)
1932		Argentina (mechanical); Canada
1934		Australia (electronic television, Brisbane)
1935	France (electronic – PTT Radio Vision)	Germany (intermediate film; semi-electronic); Netherlands (electronic, in Eindhoven by Philips)
1936	United Kingdom (electronic – BBC Television Service); Germany (electronic television - Deutscher Fernseh Rundfunk)	
1937		Free City of Danzig (electronic) (Note: Although 180-line cathode ray tube receivers were manufactured in France in 1936, a mechanical scanning camera was still used at the transmitter in Paris until 1937.); Poland (mechanical; Doświadczalna Stacja Telewizyjna)
1938		Soviet Union (electronic, CT USSR); Turkey (electronic)
1939	United States (electronic; non-commercial until 1941 - NBC)	Japan (electronic, J2PQ) (Note: Off from 1940 to 1950 due to Japan's entry in the World War II and subsequent US occupation.); (Kingdom of Italy) Italy (electronic, EIAR Trasmissioni Sperimentali Radiovisione); Poland (electronic)

=== 1940s ===
Year	Countries and territories	
Year	Regular	Pre-regular
1943	Germany; Occupied France (Fernsehsender Paris)	Uruguay (electronic)
1944	France (RDF Télévision française)	
1946		Czechoslovakia (pre-experimental); Mexico (XE1GC); United States; Philippines (BEC)
1948		Brazil (Rede Tupi); Czechoslovakia (Note: Czechoslovakia became two separate states, namely the Czech Republic and Slovakia in 1993.); Netherlands (Philips Experimentele Televisie, experimental/terrestrial)
1949		Denmark; Italy (Note: Experimental transmissions conducted in Turin; the transmitter was later linked up to the newly-launched RAI television network in 1954.)

=== 1950s ===
Year	Countries and territories	
Year	Regular	Pre-regular
1950	Mexico (official, XHTV-TV); Brazil (Rede Tupi, now defunct) (Note: License auctioned to Silvio Santos and became SBT São Paulo in 1981.); Cuba (CMQ-TV)	West Germany; Hamburg, Lower Saxony, Schleswig-Holstein, North Rhine-Westphalia, West Berlin (NWDR); Japan (returned, electronic, NHK); Switzerland
1951	Argentina (LR3 TV); Denmark (DR); Netherlands (NTS); Soviet Union; Russian SFSR (regular); Ukrainian SSR	
1952	Canada (CBFT and CBLT); Dominican Republic (La Voz Dominicana); East Germany (DFF); West Germany; Hamburg, Lower Saxony, Schleswig-Holstein, North Rhine-Westphalia, West Berlin (NWDR-Fernsehen); Poland (TV Polska); Turkey (İTÜ TV, now defunct) (Note: Limited to Istanbul. Ankara got television in 1968 when TRT started its television service. In 1971, ITU TV shut down and TRT started a station in Istanbul. From then on, a slow process to start a national service began.); United Kingdom; Scotland (BBC TV Service Scotland); United States; Hawaii (KONA); Venezuela (YVKA-TV, now defunct)	Thailand (trials)
1953	Belgium (INR Télé Expérimentale Belge and NIR Belgische Televisie) (Note: Dutch-language BRT used the Belgian 625-line standard and French-language RTB used the Belgian 819-line standard (abandoned in 1963). Early Belgian sets were very expensive because they could receive four different standards: Belgian 625, European 625, Belgian 819, French 819. Later a fifth standard was added with the French 625-line standard.); Japan (returned, NHK) (Note: Rollout for NHK started in 1953 in Kanto, 1954 in Tokai and Kansai and between 1956 and 1958 for the rest of Japan. For commercial TV, limited to Kanto from 1953 to 1955 (NTV and KRT) and spread between 1956 and 1963 to the rest of the country. Saga Prefecture only gained television (NHK and commercial) in 1969 due to overspill from neighboring prefectures and usage of UHF as the preferred band.); Mongolia; Philippines (DZAQ-TV) (Note: Coverage was limited to Manila until 1959, and by 1972 had also reached Baguio, Batangas, Bacolod, Cebu and Davao. During the Martial Law that led into first ABS-CBN shutdown, there were still many regions in the Philippines that hadn't been electrified, making a total nationwide expansion unviable for years.); France; Saar (Telesaar) (Note: Telesaar went defunct in 1958 per an order from the German authorities.); Switzerland (SRG); United States; Alaska (KATV); United Kingdom; Guernsey; Jersey	Chile (sporadically until 1959); Czechoslovakia; Hungary; United Kingdom; Jersey (relays); Vatican City (HVJ)
1954	Colombia (HJRN-TV); Czechoslovakia (ČST); Italy (Programma Nazionale); Monaco (TMC); Soviet Union; Latvian SSR (LTV); United States; Puerto Rico (WKAQ-TV); France; French Morocco (TELMA, went defunct shortly after)	Bulgaria (MEI); Hungary; Norway (NRK); Portugal; (United States) Lajes Field (CSL-TV) (Note: Not considered to be the official beginning of Portuguese television.)
1955	Austria (ORF Fernsehen); Guatemala (TGW-TV, now defunct); Luxembourg (Télé-Luxembourg); Thailand (official, HSI-TV); Soviet Union; Estonian SSR (TTV); United Kingdom; Guernsey; Jersey (BBC); Northern Ireland (BBC TV Service NI)	Bermuda; (United States) Kindley Air Force Base (ZBK-TV) (Note: Closed after a few years, following the launch of BM-TV, and copyright issues with the content shown.); Finland (test programming, TV-kerho) (Note: The channel launched in 1956 as a continuation of a project that had aired a public broadcast in May 1955 as the first television broadcast in Finland.); Iceland (AFRTS Keflavik); Saudi Arabia; (United States) Dhahran Airfield (experimental and regular programming, AJL-TV, now defunct); Romania (experimental)
1956	El Salvador (YSEB-TV); Finland (TES-TV, now defunct); France; (France) Algerian Departments (RTF Television Algiers); Iraq (BTV, now defunct and replaced by Al-Iraqiya TV); Australia (TCN-9); Nicaragua (YNSA-TV); Romania (TVR); South Korea (HLKZ-TV); Soviet Union; Armenian SSR (Armenia 1); Azerbaijan SSR (AzTV); Byelorussian SSR (Belarus 1); Georgian SSR (1TV); Uzbek SSR (MTRK); Spain (TVE); Sweden (Radiotjänst TV); United States; Guam (KUAM-TV); Panama Canal Zone (CFN); Uruguay (SAETA); Yugoslavia (RTV Zagreb) (Note: The date refers to the launch of the television channel in republics and autonomous provinces of Yugoslavia, there were: RTV Zagreb in SR Croatia (1956), RTV Ljubljana in SR Slovenia (1958), RTV Sarajevo in SR Bosnia and Herzegovina (1961), RTV Belgrade in SR Serbia (1958), RTV Skopje in SR Macedonia (1964), RTV Titograd (Podgorica) in SR Montenegro (1964), and in SAP Kosovo (RTV Priština) and SAP Vojvodina (RTV Novi Sad) was introduced in 1975.)	Portugal (RTP)
1957	Chile (UCV Televisión) (Note: Limited to Valparaíso until 1959, when Canal 2 started delivering a test broadcast in 1959 (resumed in 1961 as Canal 13); no TV outside central Chile when the basis for the Telenorte network began in Antofagasta in 1966; from 1968 to 1975, TVN built its own national network.); Hungary (MTV, now defunct); Portugal (RTP); United Kingdom; Cyprus (RIK); (British Hong Kong) Hong Kong (Rediffusion Television) (Note: Television was introduced in Hong Kong when it was a British crown colony until 1997. The Rediffusion service was a cable network until 1973, when it converted to terrestrial television.); Malta (Note: Date where relays from Italy became available.); Lithuanian SSR (LRT televizija)	
1958	China (Peking Television) (Note: This station was the first in the Chinese world to be strictly terrestrial from the outset.); Finland (Suomen Televisio); Iran (TVI) (Note: Originally limited to Tehran area, later to Abadan, and from 1969, expanded to the whole nation. Television of Iran was absorbed into National Iranian Television in 1969; since the main network of the NIRT used a different frequency from TVI (which used channel 3) in Tehran, it's likely that the former TVI frequency was turned off.); Peru (OAD-TV); Kazakh SSR (Qazaqstan); Moldavian SSR (Moldova 1); United Kingdom; Bermuda (ZBM-TV)	
1959	Bulgaria (Bulgarian Television); Chile (Canal 2 UC) (Note: Until the launch of the first version of Telenorte in Antofagasta in 1966, television was limited to central Chile (Santiago and Valparaíso). The definitive roll-out of television outside of this region didn't start until late 1968, when TVN set up its first station in Arica months before it started definitive broadcasts, though in 1969, most of its network was concentrated in central Chile.); Ecuador (HCJB-TV, now defunct) (Note: Station shut down in 1972. The frequency was later occupied by Teleamazonas starting in 1974. RTS is often erroneously believed to be the first.); Haiti (4VMR-TV); Honduras (HRTG-TV); India (AIR-TV); Lebanon (CLT); Nigeria (WNTV); Kirghiz SSR (UTRK); Tajik SSR (TVT); Turkmen SSR (Altyn Asyr); United States; Ryukyu Islands (KSDW-TV) (Note: Television was introduced in the Ryukyu Islands (now part of Japan), when they were under U.S. administration.)	Kuwait (pre-experimental)

=== 1960s ===
Year	Countries and territories	
Year	Regular	Pre-regular
1960	Albania (RTSH); Costa Rica (Teletica); The Netherlands; Netherlands Antilles (PJC-TV); New Zealand (NZBC TV); Norway (NRK); Panama (RPC); United Kingdom; Southern Rhodesia (RTV); United Arab Republic (Egyptian Television Network and Channel 1 (Syria)) (Note: The United Arab Republic was a short-lived political union between Egypt and Syria. The union began in 1958 and existed until 1961, when Syria seceded from the union.)	Greece (PPC)
1961	Cambodia (NEC and TVRK); Ireland (Telefís Éireann) (Note: Ireland had received broadcasts from the United Kingdom since 1949.); Kuwait (Kuwait Television); United Kingdom; Northern Rhodesia (RTV) (Note: Station established in Kitwe by Lonrho, one of RTV's shareholders. With the independence of Zambia in 1965, a station was set up by ZNBC in Lusaka and the existing station joined the new corporation.); United States; United States Virgin Islands (WBNB-TV, now defunct)	
1962	(Republic of the Congo) Congo-Brazzaville (RTC); Ethiopia (ETV); Indonesia (Jajasan TVRI) (Note: Originally limited to Jakarta area, and from 1965, the island of Java as a whole. The first television station outside of the island, TVRI North Sumatera, opened in 1970, after receiving just overspill coming from West Malaysia. The introduction of the Palapa satellite greatly expanded TVRI's coverage in the 1970s and 1980s.); Sudan (Sudan Television Service); Taiwan (TTV) (Note: This is the year when television was introduced in territories under its administration. After the Chinese Civil War in 1949, the government of the Republic of China retreated to Taiwan and other islands, and Mainland China was controlled by the People's Republic of China.); Trinidad and Tobago (TTT); United Kingdom; Gibraltar (First channel of its own, GBC) (Note: Gibraltar had previously received television broadcasts from Spain.); Kenya (Television Kenya); Malta (First channel of its own, MTV) (Note: Previously received television broadcasts from Italy.)	
1963	Upper Volta (VoltaVision); Gabon (RTG); Ivory Coast (RTI); Jamaica (JBC, now defunct); Malaysia (Televisyen Malaysia) (Note: Originally limited to most areas of Peninsular Malaysia; then in 1971 to Sabah and 1975 to Sarawak.); North Korea (CTBS-DPRK); Sierra Leone (SLTV); Singapore (TV Singapura Channel 5); Uganda (UTV)	Tunisia
1964	Ethiopia (ETV); Federation of South Arabia (Aden TV); Overseas France; (France) Guadeloupe (ORTF Guadeloupe); (France) Martinique (ORTF Martinique); (France) Réunion (ORTF La Réunion); Liberia (LBC); Niger (Télévision Scolaire du Niger); Pakistan (PTV and Pilot Television Dhaka); Turkey (Turkish Radio and Television Corporation); United Kingdom; Barbados (CBC-TV); Mauritius (MBC 1); Wales (BBC Cymru Wales); United States; American Samoa (KVZK-TV)	
1965	Overseas France: (France) French Polynesia (ORTF Télé Tahiti); (France) New Caledonia (ORTF Télé Nouméa); Ghana (GTV); India (AIR-TV); The Netherlands; (Suriname (Kingdom of the Netherlands)) Suriname (STVS); Paraguay (TV Cerro Cora); Saudi Arabia (Al Saudiya); Senegal (RTS); United Kingdom; Antigua and Barbuda (ZAL-TV); (Isle of Man (On-island signal tower, Border Television) (Note: Although the Isle of Man has received television signals since 1951, 1965 marked the first direct broadcast from a relay station built on the island. To date, no local television service has been set up and the island is served by BBC North West and ITV Granada (until 2009, ITV Border) with no local opt-outs.)	Tunisia (RTT)
1966	(Democratic Republic of the Congo) Congo-Kinshasa (RTNC); Greece (EIR); Iceland (Sjónvarpið); Israel (IETV, went defunct and replaced by Kan Educational) (Note: The Israeli Ministry of Education in co-operation with the Rothschild Fund started limited broadcasts to schools in March 1966. A public state-owned TV channel started broadcasting in May 1968. Broadcasts were black and white (with a few exceptions) until the early 1980s.); Tunisia (RTT); South Vietnam (THVN) (Note: now defunct and replaced by HTV.); North Yemen (SABS-TV); South Yemen (SYBS-TV); Zambia (ZNBC) (Note: Successor of the prior RTV service in Lusaka, which started in 1961.)	
1967	(France): (France) French Somaliland (RTD); (France) French Guiana (ORTF Guyane); (France) Saint Pierre and Miquelon (ORTF Saint-Pierre-et-Miquelon); Madagascar (RTM); United Kingdom; Saint Lucia (SLTV) (Note: SLTV relayed television broadcasts from Barbados. A local television station, HTS, wouldn't start until 1982.)	
1968	Equatorial Guinea (TVE Guinea Ecuatorial) (Note: Station operated autonomously by the territorial production center of Televisión Española (TVE) in the region.); Jordan (JTV); Libya (Libyan Television Service); Turkey (TRT 1)	
1969	Bolivia (Televisión Boliviana); United Kingdom; Trucial States (Abu Dhabi TV); United States; Trust Territory of the Pacific Islands (Saipan, (Note: Corresponds to the current Northern Mariana Islands.) WSZE-TV, now defunct)	

=== 1970s ===
Year	Countries and territories	
Year	Regular	Pre-regular
1970	United Kingdom; Qatar (QTV); North Vietnam (Independent Television System)	
1972	United Kingdom; Saint Christopher-Nevis-Anguilla (ZIZ)	
1973	Antarctica ( (United States) McMurdo Station (AFAN-TV)) (Note: Was replaced by a cable network with the normal AFN Television channels in the mid 90s.); Bahrain (Bahrain TV); United Kingdom territories: British Virgin Islands (ZBTV) (Note: Converted from the former cable service.); (British Hong Kong) Hong Kong (free-to-air broadcasting service, RTV); Togo (RTNM)	
1974	Central African Republic (RTC); Grenada (Grenada Television); Oman (Oman TV); Tanzania (Zanzibar (TVZ)); Yugoslavia (SAP Kosovo (Televizioni i Prishtinës))	
1975	United Kingdom; Brunei (RTB); Burundi (RTNB); United Kingdom; Dominica (Cable & Wireless Dominica) (Note: Cable service. Dominica never had a terrestrial television service. Its monopoly in the market was broken in the early 80s by Marpin Telecoms, which is currently Digicel Dominica.); Gilbert and Ellice Islands (foreign-owned launching)	South Africa (SABC TV, test transmissions) (Note: These transmissions began in May 1975 and lasted up until 4 January 1976.); Angola (experimental and regular programming, RPA)
1976	(Turkey) Turkish Federated State of Cyprus (BRT 1) (Note: Current Turkish Republic of Northern Cyprus.); United States; (Trust Territory of the Pacific Islands) Palau (WALU-TV, now defunct); South Africa (SABC TV)	Bahamas (experimental)
1977	Bahamas (ZNS-TV) (Note: The Bahamas had previously received broadcasts from the United States.); Guinea (RTG)	
1978	Afghanistan (Afghanistan National Television); Benin (ORTB); (East Timor (Indonesian province)) East Timor (TVRI Dili) (Note: Now believed to be under the jurisdiction of Radio-Televisão Timor Leste following the formal independence of the country in 2002.); Swaziland (Swazi TV); Maldives (TV Maldives)	
1979	Equatorial Guinea (returned, TVGE) (Note: Off from 1973 to 1979.); United States; Federated States of Micronesia (Yap (WAAB-TV)); Marshall Islands (MBC) (Note: Replaced a cable company set up in 1975 when it was still under the control of the Trust Territory of the Pacific Islands and was shut down due to storm surges from a hurricane in 1979.); Sri Lanka (ITN Sri Lanka) (Note: Available only in Colombo in the network's early years.)	(Myanmar) Burma (test programming) (Note: Test service available only in Yangon in 1979, and formally launched in 1981.); Mozambique (Note: Test held at FACIM 1979 in Maputo, with assistance from an Italian company.)

=== 1980s ===
Year	Countries and territories	
Year	Regular	Pre-regular
1980	(Myanmar) Burma (BBS, regular programming); Saint Vincent and the Grenadines (SVG-TV); Guyana (Vieira Communications Television)	Mauritania (experimental)
1981	Belize (Channel 7); Mozambique (TEM); United Kingdom; (South Africa) South West Africa (SWABC) (Note: Corresponds to the current country of Namibia.)	
1982	Denmark territories: Greenland (KNR); Mauritania (TV de Mauritanie); Sri Lanka (Rupavahini, national); São Tomé and Príncipe (Televisão Experimental RDSTP, experimental)	
1983	Bophuthatswana (Bop TV) (Note: After the dissolution of Bophuthatswana, the station was integrated into the SABC and later shut down.); (Cambodia) Kampuchea (re-established, TVK); Laos (LNTV) (Note: Television is available from Nong Khai city in Thailand since the mid-1970s.); Mali (ORTM); Seychelles (RTS); Somalia (Telefishanka J. D. Soomaaliya) (Note: Off from 1991 to 2011 as the channel was suspended due to the civil war. During the interim, numerous private television stations appeared.); Vatican City (First channel of its own, Centro Televisivo Vaticano) (Note: Although the Vatican did not have a television service of its own until 1983, broadcasts from Italy had been received since 1954.); Saint Lucia (HTS, local)	Tonga (VAP-TV18, now defunct) (Note: Subscription service, shut down in 1987, during its existence it also faced competition from ASTL-TV3, itself a subscription service until the 1991 launch of the Oceania Broadcasting Network, ASTL-TV3 later shut down in 1996.); Cape Verde (pre-experimental)
1984	Cape Verde (TEVEC); Denmark; Faroe Islands (SvF); Finland; Åland (First channel of its own, TV Åland); Norway; Svalbard (NRK); Portugal; (Portugal) Macau (TDM); United Kingdom; Tristan da Cunha (taped service)	
1985	Cameroon (CTV); Nepal (NTV)	Australia; Norfolk Island (relays from mainland Australia)
1986	France; Mayotte (RFO Mayotte); Wallis and Futuna (RFO Wallis-et-Futuna); New Zealand; Niue (Bliss Cablevision) (Note: Assets sold to the government of Niue in 1989 and converted to a free-to-air terrestrial operation, TV Niue.); Ciskei (TBN Ciskei) (Note: Established as a private operation from the US Trinity Broadcasting Network by arrangement with the Venda government. After apartheid ended, the station likely shut down and resumed in 1997 as a community station under IBA/ICASA rules (TBN Eastern Cape). That station later went national on DStv in 2002 but ended its ties with TBN in 2014, becoming Faith Broadcasting Network.)	
1987	Chad (Télé Tchad); Papua New Guinea (EM TV, Niugini Television Network)	
1988	Lesotho (Lesotho Television),	Botswana (GBC TV, in Gaborone),
1989	New Zealand; Cook Islands (Cook Islands Television); Guinea-Bissau (TEGB)	

=== 1990s ===
Year	Countries and territories	
Year	Regular	Pre-regular
1991	Nauru (NTV); United Kingdom; Akrotiri and Dhekelia (First channel of its own, SSVC TV Cyprus); Cayman Islands (Cayman 27, now defunct); Falkland Islands (FITV) (Note: Television broadcasts had also been received from Argentina.)	Fiji (FijiTV) (Note: Television came to Fiji in part-time for the 1991 Rugby World Cup, and it arrived in full-time in 1994.)
1992	Republika Srpska (1992–1995) (RTV Krajina Banja Luka); São Tomé and Príncipe (TVS); Solomon Islands (TTV); South Ossetia (Ir); Transnistria (PMR TV); Rwanda (TVR); Western Samoa (SBC Television 1)	Vanuatu (TBV)
1993	Eritrea (Eri-TV); Palestine (Al-Salam TV and PBC) (Note: Excludes occupied settlements and overspill coming from Jordan and Israel. Both Gaza and the West Bank are included.); San Marino (First channel of its own, San Marino RTV); Slovakia (Post-independence, STVR); Vanuatu (TBV)	
1994	Tanzania (mainland, Coastal Television Network)	
1995	Andorra (First channel of its own, ATV) (Note: ATV's origins trace back to the early 90s as an opt-out in the local relay of TVC's second channel, Canal 33.); Fiji (FijiTV); Gambia (Gambia Radio & Television Service); United Kingdom; Saint Helena (Sure South Atlantic Ltd); Turks and Caicos Islands (WIV Channel 4)	
1997	Somaliland (Somaliland Space Channel); United Kingdom; Montserrat (Peoples Television) (Note: Previously relayed broadcasts from Antigua and Barbuda.)	
1999	Bhutan (BBS); Malawi (TVM)	Tuvalu (limited service)

=== 2000s and 2010s ===
Year	Countries and territories
2000	Botswana (BTV, national); Tonga (TV Tonga, national)
2001	Tokelau (foreign channels, no local service); United Kingdom; Tristan da Cunha (BFBS, live service) (Note: Previous served by a videotape service.)
2002	Kiribati (TV Kiribati, native, but suspended from 2013 to 2018)
2006	Comoros (ORTC); (Hamas) Gaza Strip (Al-Aqsa TV); Palau (OTV, returned) (Note: Excluding the cable network installed by the PNCC in 1990.); United Kingdom; Pitcairn Islands
2008	Liechtenstein (First channel of its own, 1FLTV) (Note: Liechtenstein previously received television broadcasts from Switzerland.)
2009	Sahrawi Arab Democratic Republic (RASD TV) (Note: RASD TV was established in February 2004, but didn't broadcast its regular transmissions until 2009.)
2010	The Netherlands; Sint Maarten (TV-CARIB); South Sudan (South Sudan Television) (Note: Became the national broadcaster upon independence in 2011.)
2011	Australia; Norfolk Island (First channel of its own, TVNI)
2014	Donetsk People's Republic (Novorossiya TV) (Note: Excludes local stations that existed before and were confiscated by the new regimes. Suspilne still has channels for the occupied areas, which as of 2024 are "temporarily occupied" according to the official stance of the Ukrainian government.); Luhansk People's Republic (Luhansk 24)
2018	Kiribati (Kiri 1 TV, returned)
2019	Tuvalu (returned, Tuvalu.TV)

== See also ==
- History of television
- List of years in television
- Geographical usage of television
- Prewar television stations
- Timeline of the introduction of color television in countries and territories
- Timeline of the introduction of radio in countries
