= Logi Bergmann Eiðsson =

Icelandic television host (born 1966)

- Born: 2 December 1966
- Occupations: News anchor, television host
- Television: Fréttir; Gettu betur Fréttir (Stöð 2); Logi í beinni Meistarinn
- Spouse(s): Ólöf Dagný Óskarsdóttir (divorced); Svanhildur Hólm Valsdóttir (2005 - present)

Logi Bergmann Eiðsson (born 2 December 1966) is an Icelandic television host, news anchor and reporter. He worked for the public broadcaster Sjónvarpið before his move to private channel Stöð 2 in 2005. He later started work at Sjónvarp Símans in 2017.

Eiðsson started his career in media as a reporter for the newspaper Þjóðviljinn, and later for Morgunblaðið.

Eiðsson was a sports correspondent, and later news reporter, anchor, producer and deputy head of news for Sjónvarpið, in addition to hosting the quiz show Gettu betur for six years. He started a quiz show called spurningabomban on stöð tvö. After his move to Sjónvarp Símans he started a show called með Loga.

In 2002, Eiðsson applied for the position of head of news at Sjónvarpið, but lost to his fellow deputy Elín Hirst. Eiðsson said at the time that the hiring process was highly political. Eiðsson claims to have been an outspoken communist as a teenager, as his father, Eiður Bergmann, was the managing director of left-wing newspaper Þjóðviljinn.

On Stöð 2 Eiðsson served as news anchor, and hosted the weekly talk show Logi í beinni. He also hosted the short-lived quiz show Meistarinn.

Eiðsson married television host Svanhildur Hólm Valsdóttir on 16 June 2005.
