= Elín Hirst =

Icelandic politician (born 1960)

- Born: 4 September 1960 (age 66); Reykjavík, Iceland
- Education: University of Florida
- Occupations: Member of Parliament, Journalist, documentary filmmaker, published author, TV news anchor
- Television: Fréttir

Elín Stefánsdóttir Hirst (born 4 September 1960) is an Icelandic politician, and a former member of the Althing from 2013 to 2016.

Elín is a former journalist, television personality, published author, documentary filmmaker and anchor. She was Head of News of Icelandic public television channel Sjónvarpið from 2002 to 2008.

Elín graduated from the University of Oslo with a diploma in economics in 1981, a Bachelor in journalism from University of Florida in 1984, and went for a major in history in the university of Iceland in 2005.

Elín was a member of the board of directors of the Icelandic division of UNESCO from 2002 to 2004.
