= American Forces Antarctic Network =

American Forces Antarctic Network is the name given to the American Forces Network operations for its bases in Antarctica, based out of McMurdo Station.

== Radio ==
AFAN McMurdo or McMurdo Sound is an FM radio station broadcasting on 93.9 MHz with 30 W and 104.5 MHz with 50 W. Unusually for an AFN station, AFAN is civil and is supported by the United States Antarctic Program (USAP). McMurdo houses one of the largest, and possibly, one of the last, vinyl record collections of any media supervised by the US government's Defense Media Activity (DMA) . Depending on the tally, the collection has 12,000 to 20,000 records. Part of the collection came from AFRTS's former station in Saigon, Vietnam, and includes diverse genres such as rock, pop, rap, etc.

The station was created to boost morale of men and women serving at the US Antarctic bases. It only broadcasts on FM for McMurdo Station, the nearby New Zealand Scott Base and the South Pole base. AFAN also formerly broadcast on AM and shortwave, changing its kHz frequency seasonally.

=== History ===
The original radio station was on air in 1963, under the callsign KMSA. Originally it broadcast on 600 kHz AM and operating with a 50-watt power. By 1971, the callsign had changed to WASA, for W Antarctic Support Activities, and in 1975, it was renamed AFAN. Originally, the station was located at a building shared by stores, a barbershop and a bar. The station aired tapes which were changed a few times a year.

In 1974, the station became a part of DXing, being heard from New Zealand to the United States, despite its weak signal and interferences. This happened until 1991 when its shortwave transmitter ceased operation. In 1995, its equipment was relocated to the United States. The station started broadcasting exclusively locally on a low-powered FM transmitter due to problems suffered from the activity of solar sports and the complete loss of signal, occasionally for days on end.

Finally, the station was relocated to its current location at the 155 Building, with the vinyl records collection located at a nearby building. Such building also houses McMurdo's kitchen and canteen, a store, offices and residential dormitories.

Since at least the 2000s, there are three radio stations and several TV channels. The original radio station is now known as Ice 104.5 FM, detached from AFN as an independent station, with a 50-watt transmitter, enough to send its signal for 10 kilometers or 6.21 miles. During the summer period of the southern hemisphere in 2011–2012, new digital and analog equipment was installed. Two DMA staff normally reach McMurdo for routine maintenance of audio and visual systems, as well as special projects to update the radio equipment. The new station configuration has a digital catalog of 38,000 tracks. 30 volunteers of the station work there.

The other FM station, 93.9, relays AFN radio programming received via satellite. The third station is available on 88.7, is a low-power station, and only reaches McMurdo. Although it is classified as a pirate radio station by some, it operates as a sort of "no man's land" for US communication regulations.

== Television ==
McMurdo Station set up the first television station in Antarctica, AFAN-TV, which started broadcasting on November 9, 1973. Its programming, under the control of the US armed forces, consisted largely of US programs and interviews with visitors and scientists on the base, as well as a daily news and weather service. The station's equipment was susceptible to "electronic burping" from the diesel generators in the outpost. The station was profiled in a May 1975 TV Guide article. At the time, the station broadcast in the summer months, known by staff as "the season" (November to February), the only season where Antarctica was (at the time) open to aircraft. It was initially a black and white operation, using a 100-watt transmitter, which enabled relays to Scott Base and Williams Field. The average audience at the time was of 30 to 40 viewers, however some programming drew in viewers by the hundreds, such as taped NFL broadcasts, Sesame Street (despite the lack of children on the base) and, one Sunday in the 1974-75 AFAN-TV season, a five-and-a-half hour Star Trek marathon. The low ratings were attributed to its black and white output, which competed against theatrical movies which were already projected in color.

In 1990, AFAN installed a cable television station on the base. By 1998, shortly after the launch of new AFN television services the year before, the traditional AFN network (later AFN Prime) was broadcast over cable channel 2, while NewSports ran on channel 11 and Spectrum on channel 13.
