= AJL =

AJL may refer to:

- AJL-TV, a defunct television station operated by the Armed Forces Radio and Television Service
- Ahmedabad Janmarg Limited, a public transport company in Ahmedabad, India
- Algorithmic Justice League, an organization that looks at the social implications of artificial intelligence
- Anugerah Juara Lagu, Malaysian song contest
- Association of Jewish Libraries
- Associated Journals Limited, an Indian newspaper publisher
