= AFN Prime =

Main channel of the American Forces Network

- Country: United States
- Broadcast area: United States military bases
- Headquarters: Riverside, California, U.S.

Programming
- Language: English
- Picture format: 1080i (HDTV)

Ownership
- Owner: American Forces Network
- Sister channels: List: AFN News; AFN Sports; AFN Sports 2; AFN Spectrum; AFN Movie; AFN Family

History
- Launched: October 19, 1954; 71 years ago

Links
- Website: MyAFN

Availability limited to U.S. military personnel in military bases

Streaming media
- Affiliated Streaming Service: AFN Now

AFN Prime is the main channel of the American Forces Network. The channel feed airs current sitcoms, dramas, syndicated court shows, talk shows, game shows and reality shows popular in the United States, from U.S. over-the-air and cable networks, with a time delay from 24 hours to six months or more behind the United States airdates. In addition, popular U.S. soap operas such as General Hospital are aired by AFN on a one-week tape delay.

This stream is divided into two feeds (AFN Prime Atlantic and AFN Prime Pacific); the difference between the three is that they are time-shifted so that programs air at the same local time in each of the major regions served: Japan/Korea, Central Europe and Iraq. Many regional feeds (such as AFN-Europe and AFN-Korea) are based on AFN Prime and add local programming to it; thus, in a way, AFN Prime mimics the regular network TV concept.

== History ==
The current AFN Prime channel has its origins in 1954, when the Armed Forces Radio and Television Service was setting up a network of television stations for overseas bases. Gen. Curtis E. LeMay brought the idea forth of setting up television stations to boost morale of servicemen stationed in US Air Force bases. To this end, AFRS was renamed AFRTS on April 21, 1954.

The first overseas station to sign on was CSL-TV on October 17, 1954 in the Lajes Field in Azores, becoming the first television station in Portuguese territory. Other stations followed over time, such as ZBK-TV in Bermuda (which shut down in 1959) and the Keflavik station in 1955. A station was installed at Midway Atoll in early 1959, before most Pacific islands and territories had a service. Its station at McMurdo, AFAN-TV, started on November 9, 1973 as the first television channel available in Antarctica, which at the time was a seasonal operation dependent on the time of the year (November to February) open to air traffic.

Until 1997, the Armed Forces Network operated only one television channel. Until the shut down of over-the-air analog television signals, the main channel was carried. The remainder of the channels was limited to on-base facilities. On September 26, 1997, around the time of the launch of two new channels, the extant channel was renamed AFN, with three versions, AFN Atlantic, AFN Pacific and AFN Americas.

With the creation of two new channels on September 3, 2004, AFN Europe, AFN Pacific and AFN Korea were renamed AFN Prime. In December 2004, AFN Prime Pacific replaced tape-delayed news programs with live simulcasts. The independent AFN Korea feed was removed from DTS systems in 2006. A fourth feed of the channel, AFN Prime Freedom, started broadcasting on December 22, 2006. It targeted US troops in the Middle East, specifically Iraq and Afghanistan, showing its programming two hours earlier to accommodate the local timezones. It shut down in June 2013 after the drawdown of troops from the Middle East.

The channel was widely available on cable in South Korea until December 2007, when it was removed on order of USFK to the Korean Broadcasting Commission due to issues regarding U.S. program sales to Korean over-the-air and cable networks. The previous year, AFN Prime Korea refused to air live NFL games in order to prevent copyright infringement. The addition of more sports would jeopardize its coverage. Over-the-air broadcasts in Korea ended on May 1, 2012.

Over-the-air broadcast to military bases in Germany and Belgium ended in 2010 as part of AFN's drive its technological improvement. In bases in Japan, AFN Prime Pacific's analog signals were to be replaced by cable signals. Over-the-air broadcasts in Lajes ended in 2011.
