= ABC 7 =

ABC 7 may refer to one of the following television stations in the United States:

== Owned and operated stations ==
- KABC-TV in Los Angeles, California, which operates the abc7.com website
- KGO-TV in San Francisco, California
- WABC-TV in New York, New York
- WLS-TV in Chicago, Illinois

== Affiliate stations ==
- KATV in Little Rock, Arkansas
- KETV in Omaha, Nebraska
- KHQA-DT2 in Hannibal, Missouri–Quincy, Illinois
- KLTV in Tyler, Texas
- KMGH-TV in Denver, Colorado
- KOAT-TV in Albuquerque, New Mexico
- KRCR-TV in Chico–Redding, California
- KSWO-TV in Lawton, Oklahoma–Wichita Falls, Texas
- KTGM in Guam (cable channel; broadcasts on channel 14)
- KVIA-TV in El Paso, Texas
- KVII-TV in Amarillo, Texas
- WBBJ-TV in Jackson, Tennessee
- WDAM-DT2 in Hattiesburg, Mississippi
- WJLA-TV in Washington, D.C.
- WKBW-TV in Buffalo, New York
- WPBN-DT2, a simulcast of WGTU in Traverse City–Cadillac, Michigan
- WSVN-DT2 in Miami, Florida
- WTRF-DT3 in Wheeling, West Virginia
- WVII-TV in Bangor, Maine
- WWSB in Sarasota, Florida (cable channel; broadcasts on channel 40)
- WXYZ-TV in Detroit, Michigan
- ZFB-TV in Bermuda (broadcasts on channel 19.7; branding is by former analog channel number)

== Formerly affiliated ==
- KBZK in Bozeman, Montana (1987–1993)
- WCPO-TV in Cincinnati , Ohio (was on channel 7 from 1949 to 1953)
- WJHG-TV in Panama City, Florida (1953–1982)
- WNAC-TV (Boston) in Boston, Massachusetts (1961–1972)
- WTVW in Evansville, Indiana (1956–1995)
- WZVN-TV in Naples, Florida (broadcasts on channel 26; was branded as ABC 7 from 1994–2025)

== See also ==
- Circle 7 logo, one of the main logos or symbols used by all of the ABC O&Os using the number 7 and many ABC affiliates using the channel 7.
