= CBS 9 =

CBS 9 may refer to one of the following television stations in the United States:

== Current ==
- KWTV in Oklahoma City, Oklahoma
- KXLH-LD in Helena, Montana
  - Re-broadcast of KRTV in Great Falls, Montana
- WAFB in Baton Rouge, Louisiana
- WNCT-TV in Greenville–New Bern–Washington, North Carolina
- WUSA in Washington, D.C.
- WWTV in Cadillac–Traverse City, Michigan
- ZBM-TV in Hamilton, Bermuda (branding channel; broadcasts on channel 20.9)

== Former ==
- KBTV (now KUSA) in Denver, Colorado (1952–1953)
- KECY-TV in El Centro, California–Yuma, Arizona (1970 to 1982 and 1985 to 1994)
- KGMB in Honolulu, Hawaii (1952–2009)
- KVTV (now KCAU-TV) in Sioux City, Iowa (1953–1967)
- WSTV-TV (now WTOV-TV) in Steubenville, Ohio–Wheeling, West Virginia (1953–1980)
- WGN-TV in Chicago, Illinois (primary from 1948–1949, then secondary from 1949–1953)
- KMBC-TV in Kansas City, Missouri (1953–1955)
