= Richard Broadbridge =

Fijian businessman

Richard Broadbridge is a Fijian journalist and media executive. In 2006 he founded private TV channel Mai TV.

Broadbridge was educated at Sacred Heart College, Auckland and the Marist Brothers High School, Fiji. He started his career in 1993 as a journalist with the Fiji Broadcasting Corporation Limited (formerly Radio Fiji). He is also a former Fiji TV employee and TV Journalist. He was the first local reporter when Fiji TV started Fiji One News in April 1994. He resigned from Fiji TV in 2001.

In 2006 he became founder and CEO of Mai TV. He left the company in 2014 to build a media venture in Papua New Guinea, Click Pacific. In 2018 he helped launch a TV station in Kiribati. The following year he assisted staff from the Tuvalu Broadcasting Corporation to conduct a test broadcast of the Parliament of Tuvalu for the then-upcoming Tuvalu.TV, which opened in December 2019.
