= Victor Espadinha =

Singer and portuguese actor

Vítor Espadinha (Lapa, Lisbon, 10 July 1939), is a Portuguese actor and musician. He is best known for his song Recordar é Viver, which he released in 1978.

== History ==
Born in 1939 in the Lisbon neighborhood of Lapa, his father owned a casino and his mother was a servant. He was raised by one of his father's sisters, after which he moved to Coimbra to study Agronomics unsuccessfully.

In 1956, he decided to go to Mozambique under Portuguese rule to see his father. It was there where he started his theatre career at Teatro Avenida in Lourenço Marques; he also worked as a journalist, writing for A Tribuna. In 1963, he moved to Kitwe, Northern Rhodesia, where he studied theatre and worked at a television station (NR TV, previously part of Rhodesia Television). He later moved to London, where he did a series of jobs: as a dishwasher, packaging Hitachi television sets, acting as a croupier at a Playboy casino and having minor roles in television series. Subsequently he returned to Lisbon but had to balance his duties between both cities. He was appointed journalist at Diário de Notícias and also joined Rádio Clube Português as the first Portuguese disc jockey, where he applied the know-how he learned from David Davies in London.

On the day of the Carnation Revolution, he was in London; the following day (26 April 1974), he was landed a role in the successful play Mostra-me a tua Piscina (Show Me Your Pool), which was staged at Capitólio for two years. Despite the success, he returned to London as a dishwasher, but returned to Portugal in 1977 where he presented a skit about a clown in the iconic game show A Visita da Cornélia. Not long after, his musical career began with a contract with Polygram, starting with Palhaço Até ao Fim (1977), followed by Recordar é Viver (1978), a hit single, with over a million copies sold as of 2024.

In addition to music and theatre, he also took part in television productions. In recent years, he virtually disappeared from television. In the past, he had a tense relation with Rádio Renascença, as the station censored his tracks. In 2026, he criticized RTP, SIC and TVI for not giving him airtime; he also wanted to become director of programs at one of the three networks.

== Personal life ==
He married in 1982.
