= Fernance B. Perry =

Fernance B. Perry, MBE
- Born: November 25, 1922; Ponta Delgada, Azores, Portugal
- Died: November 27, 2014 (age 92); Atlanta, Georgia, U.S.
- Occupations: Chairman, Bermuda Broadcasting; CEO, Mayfair Ltd. Vice chairman, Bermuda Container Line
- Board member of: BF&M Ltd. (1991–2007); Bermuda Hospital Board (1989–1991); Saltus Grammar School
- Spouse: Janice Byrd
- Children: 3
- Awards: MBE

Fernance Bento Perry, MBE (November 25, 1922 – November 27, 2014), was a Portuguese-Bermudian entrepreneur and business leader, who had a prominent role in the economy of Bermuda from the mid-20th century to the time of his death in 2014. Originally from the Azores, his professional career spanned such diverse fields as retail supermarkets, television and radio broadcasting, real estate management and maritime shipping. His philanthropic works contributed to healthcare improvements and programmes of spiritual enrichment in Bermuda. In recognition of his achievements, Perry was appointed a Member of the Order of the British Empire (MBE) in 2007. He died on November 27, 2014, at age 92.

== Early life ==
The eldest of eight children, Fernance Perry was born November 25, 1922, in Ponta Delgada, São Miguel Island in the Azores. He emigrated to Bermuda in 1926 as a young child with his parents, Manuel and Emily. As a young man in his early twenties living in Bermuda, a British overseas territory, he served in the Bermuda Volunteer Rifle Corps during World War II.

== Business career ==
In 1950, Perry acquired a small “Piggly Wiggly” grocery store in downtown Hamilton, subsequently expanding his food marketing business during the 1960s–1970s to an island-wide chain of supermarkets. He eventually sold the retail chain of supermarkets called Piggly Wiggly in 1979, but retained the real estate. The new owners changed the chain's brand name to "MarketPlace", as it is now known.

Once called the island nation's "supermarket king" by Bermuda's Royal Gazette newspaper, Perry was also active in broadcasting and real estate development. In 1994, he invested in a large Bermuda holding company, BDC, when it was experiencing cash flow problems. Two years later, in 1996, he was named BDC's chairman, but sold his shares the following year.

He was majority shareholder and chairman of Bermuda Broadcasting, which owns Bermuda's two over-the-air television stations, ABC-affiliate ZFB (channel 7) and CBS-affiliate ZBM (channel 9), along with radio stations Power 95, FM 89, and FM 105. In 2008, in the wake of labour unrest and amidst a staff shake-up at the broadcasting company, Perry told the Royal Gazette, "I think that the future looks bright". The following year, a strike by 40 unionised employees in April, 2009, halted all programming at the company's radio and television stations for four days. Perry said that changes in work rules and staff pay were needed "to help a financially ailing company". The work stoppage was settled and normal operations resumed on April 21, after government mediation.

At the time of his death, Perry was president and CEO of Mayfair Ltd., a holding company with offices in Hamilton, as well as vice chairman of Bermuda Container Line Limited, which operates container ship service to Bermuda from Port Elizabeth, New Jersey, and Fernandina Beach, Florida. He also was majority owner of Devonshire Properties Ltd., a real estate management firm.

Perry served on the board of directors of BF&M Limited, a Bermuda insurance company, from 1991 until his resignation in January, 2007. He also served on the board of trustees of Bermuda's Saltus Grammar School.

== Philanthropy ==
Between 1989–1991, Perry was chairman of the Bermuda Hospitals Board, when $13.8 million in improvements were made to King Edward VII Memorial Hospital. The "Perry Ward" at the hospital was named in recognition of his contributions to Bermuda health care.

A devoutly religious man, Perry was a long-time member of the Evangelical Church of Bermuda, a Protestant church founded by Portuguese immigrants in 1890. He developed a 5.9-acre (2 ha) island he owned in the Great Sound as a Christian youth campground, naming it Grace Island. Equipped with a chapel and campsites, it is used by Word of Life youth groups and others. He was one of the founders of the old Willowbank Resort and Christian retreat in Bermuda, where such speakers as Woodrow Kroll of Back to the Bible conducted conferences, and was the defunct resort's Chairman of the Board of Trustees prior to its closing in 2011.

== Awards ==
In the New Year Honours 2007, Perry was appointed a Member of the Order of the British Empire for services to commerce and the community. Asked by a Royal Gazette reporter for his reaction upon learning he was awarded the MBE, Perry said, "All my friends will be happy to know that at least I have got something at my old age. I wasn’t expecting it but they say that when you don’t expect something then you get it." He was subsequently congratulated by resolution of the Azores parliament in January, 2007, for having achieved the honour.

== Personal life and death ==
Perry's first marriage was to Trina Rose and they had one son, Richard. Perry later married Janice Byrd (born 1952) and they had three children: Christopher (born 1980), Tiffany (born 1983), and Jonathan Michael (born 1985). Perry had four grandchildren as of 2010. In addition to his Bermuda residence in Pembroke Parish, he also had U.S. residences in Atlanta, Georgia, and Naples, Florida. Perry was a member of the Mid Ocean Club, the Royal Hamilton Amateur Dinghy Club, and the Royal Bermuda Yacht Club. He died in Atlanta at age 92 on November 27, 2014.
