= AFN Sports 2 =

- Country: United States
- Broadcast area: United States military bases and family homes via IPTV distribution
- Headquarters: Riverside, California, U.S.

Programming
- Language: English
- Picture format: 1080i (HDTV)

Ownership
- Owner: American Forces Network
- Sister channels: List: AFN Prime; AFN Spectrum; AFN News; AFN Sports; AFN Movie; AFN Family

History
- Launched: February 5, 2006; 20 years ago
- Closed: March 22, 2026; 5 months ago (via satellite)

Links
- Website: MyAFN

Availability limited to U.S. military personnel in military bases

Streaming media
- Affiliated Streaming Service: AFN Now

AFN Sports 2 is AFN's exclusive home for UFC and WWE 'premium event' programming, as well as motor sports, including NASCAR, NHRA, motocross, and multiple other overflow sports rights.

== History ==
The channel started broadcasting on February 5, 2006, at AFN Xtra, a channel targeting the 18-35 demographic. Broadcasts started extra-officially in anticipation for the 2006 Winter Olympics, which were set to start on February 10, with full broadcasts beginning on February 27. In addition to overflow sports coverage, the channel carried a mix of shows such as The Daily Show, Fear Factor, Family Guy, The Simpsons and WWE SmackDown. The sports coverage differed from AFN Sports, providing events of interest to the target audience, which was more interested in surfing, skateboarding and hiking. By 2007, it had even carried poker.

A 2015 survey revealed that the AFN audience tuned in to sports content more than any other type of programming seen on its channels. By the time of the survey, the channel carried eight hours of sports on weekdays and the whole day on weekends. In May, it was announced that AFN Xtra would be replaced by a new channel, AFN Sports 2, enabling an additional 80 weekly hours of sports programming, effective June 1. Under the plan, some of its popular shows such as Tosh.0 and Jimmy Kimmel Live! would move to other AFN channel. In 2017, in line with other AFN networks, it converted to high definition.

With AFN services moving from satellite distribution to IPTV streaming (including access to individual programs), the channel moved exclusively to that mode of distribution on March 22, 2026.
