= AFN Family =

- Country: United States
- Broadcast area: United States military bases and family homes via IPTV distribution
- Headquarters: Riverside, California, U.S.

Programming
- Language: English
- Picture format: 1080i (HDTV)

Ownership
- Owner: American Forces Network
- Sister channels: List: AFN Prime; AFN News; AFN Sports; AFN Sports 2; AFN Spectrum; AFN Movie

History
- Launched: September 2, 2004; 22 years ago
- Closed: March 22, 2026; 5 months ago (via satellite)

Links
- Website: MyAFN

Availability limited to U.S. military personnel in military bases

Streaming media
- Affiliated Streaming Service: AFN Now

AFN Family is a general entertainment channel providing programming for children ages 2 to 17.

The channel follows the traditional scheduling structure of mainland American children's networks such as Nickelodeon and Disney Channel, where preschool programming starts in the morning, followed by afternoon general children's programming, then programming for teens at night, under the title of AFN Pulse.

== History ==
AFN featured children's programming on what would become the AFN Prime network prior to its launch; in January 2003, it was announced that the service would launch two new networks, a family network and a movie network (which would become AFN Movie), beginning in December 2003. Under the move, AFN Spectrum was set to lose some of its programming. The launch of the two channels were delayed; by August 2004, it and AFN Movie were headed for a September 3, 2004 launch; meanwhile, the channel had launched on satellites as a placeholder until the scheduled date. Broadcasts started de facto on September 2, but de jure on September 3; for a time after its launch, children's programming continued to air in limited number on AFN Prime.

In its early years, programming started with pre-school content from 5am to 3pm, followed by programming for school-age kids and families until 7pm, the latter consisting mostly of contemporary cable cartoons and some live-action programming, such as AFV or sitcoms. Programming from 7pm was geared towards teenagers and consisted mostly of teen sitcoms, either from cable or over-the-air networks, while overnight, reruns of some of the afternoon and evening shows were carried.

Beginning September 2013, the AFN Family Primetime day-part of the channel was given an identity of its own, AFN Pulse, similar to Nickelodeon's overnight branding and schedule as Nick at Nite.

In 2017, in line with other AFN networks, it converted to high definition.

With AFN services moving from satellite distribution to IPTV streaming (including access to individual programs), the channel moved exclusively to that mode of distribution on March 22, 2026.
