= AFN Sports =

- Country: United States
- Broadcast area: United States military bases
- Headquarters: Riverside, California, U.S.

Programming
- Language: English
- Picture format: 1080i (HDTV)

Ownership
- Owner: American Forces Network
- Sister channels: List: AFN Prime; AFN Spectrum; AFN News; AFN Sports 2; AFN Movie; AFN Family

History
- Launched: August 7, 2001; 25 years ago

Links
- Website: MyAFN

Availability limited to U.S. military personnel in military bases

Streaming media
- Affiliated Streaming Service: AFN Now

AFN Sports is a rolling-sports channel, providing sports news and events, including ESPN's SportsCenter and live and delayed broadcasts of the NFL, NBA, NASCAR, MLB, NHL, NCAA college football, men's and women's NCAA college basketball, FIFA soccer and PGA Tour, as well as other highly rated team competitions. Most major boxing and martial arts events, including all pay-per-view events from WWE and other promoters, airs on the channel with no additional payment to the viewer.

== History ==
Sports broadcasts have been part of AFN as far back as the pre-satellite days, even becoming a part of the SATNET service introduced in 1982, enabling the introduction of live events. Until then, live coverage was only possible by radio. This was replaced on January 2, 1997 by NewSports, a hybrid news and sports channel, which increased the amount of sports telecasts available to the viewer. Most of the events carried by the service were shown on a tape delay, for nine hours on weekdays and twenty on weekends.

In July 2001, it was announced that a full-time AFN Sports channel would launch on a separate capacity, while the existing NewSports would become AFN News.

On September 23, 2011, AFN Sports started high definition broadcasts, becoming the first AFN channel to do so. During the 2013 government showdown, sports telecasts were briefly shown on AFN News.
