= Mai TV =

Television channel in the Fiji Islands

- Mai TV logo
- Country: Fiji
- Broadcast area: Nationally

Programming
- Language: English

Ownership
- Owner: New-Methodist Christian Fellowship, Stanley Simpson

History
- Launched: 2006

Links
- Website: Official website

Mai TV is a commercial free-to-air TV network based in the Fiji Islands.

== History ==
The company was founded in 2006 by Richard Broadbridge and began broadcasts in June 2008. It is full privately owned and broadcasts to 100% of the Fiji group of islands. Mai TV's head office is at Garden City Suva.

Mai TV owned the exclusive Pacific rights to the 2008 Rugby League World Cup along with rights to some major properties including CSI series, Survivor, 60 Minutes, Jericho, EROS Movies, Chuck, TWI Sport and on July 13, 2009, they acquired the rights to broadcast live 2010 FIFA World Cup.

In 2011 MAI TV aired three FIFA World Cup events delivering on its promise to FIFA to provide matches for free to Pacific Island broadcasters. Mai TV is credited with increasing the profile of football on television and in conjunction with Oceania Football Confederation provided LIVE TV and internet coverage of OFC qualifiers. Mai TV has ventured also into Hindi content with major local shows like Manoa We Ni Yava, Gospel Quest, Fiji Today, Fiji Focus, Mai Fiji, Misiki and Digicel InTunes filling up their prime time hours. Mai TV also airs 1News (provided by TVNZ) and four hour blocks of Al Jazeera and Australia Network daily.

In 2013 Broadridge was replaced as CEO by Marc Santos. In 2016 it was sold to the New Methodist Christian Fellowship.

Mai TV is the only broadcaster in the Pacific Islands to stream content from Fiji including three major football events, Gospel Quest, 2012 National Budget address and TFL's Exporter of the year awards.

MAI TV outsources all its production needs to Skylite Productions Fiji and has a close working relationship with sister company and Fiji's most successful monthly lifestyle magazine Mai Life

In 2014, Mai TV got the rights to the Bundesliga from 2014 to 2015.

In 2016, Mai TV got the rights to the UEFA Euro 2016. In late July, it was granted a Walesi slot, being on channel 4.

In early 2017, 50% of Mai TV's shares were bought by the New-Methodist Christian Fellowship in Fiji. The remaining 50% is owned by Stanley Simpson.

The channel made its first overseas trip in November 2025 with assistance from Pasifika TV, when members of its crew travelled to Auckland to provide a live pay-per-view stream of the Pacific Community Cup.

== Programming ==
As of February 2020, Mai TV's programming consists mostly of Christian programs, including relays from TBN. The channel also aired 1News and relays of the Arirang channel at the time.

A small number of local content is made, including Christian programming.
