= AFN Movie =

- Country: United States
- Broadcast area: United States military bases and family homes via IPTV distribution
- Headquarters: Riverside, California, U.S.

Programming
- Language: English
- Picture format: 1080i (HDTV)

Ownership
- Owner: American Forces Network
- Sister channels: List: AFN Prime; AFN News; AFN Sports; AFN Sports 2; AFN Spectrum; AFN Family

History
- Launched: September 2, 2004; 22 years ago
- Closed: March 22, 2026; 5 months ago (via satellite)

Links
- Website: MyAFN

Availability limited to U.S. military personnel in military bases

Streaming media
- Affiliated Streaming Service: AFN Now

AFN Movie is a channel showcasing movies as well as film-oriented programming.

== History ==
In January 2003, AFN announced the creation of AFN Family and AFN Movie, scheduled to start in December 2003. The launch of the two channels were delayed for technical reasons; and were announced in August 2004 to start on September 3; meanwhile, the channel had launched on satellites as a placeholder until the scheduled date. Broadcasts started de facto on September 2, but de jure on September 3; however, it still held provisional broadcasts for the length of the 2004 Summer Olympics, relaying events seen on CNBC and MSNBC.

From the outset of the channel, the network has been targeted towards a predominantly adult audience. Like the other channels of the AFN network, it airs a mix of new releases (available two years after theatrical release) and other films from throughout the decades. Like American premium film channels, films air without commercial advertising and not in specific hour/half-hour blocks, with interstitial programming airing to fill the remainder of a timeslot if needed.

In 2017, in line with other AFN networks, it converted to high definition.

With AFN services moving from satellite distribution to IPTV streaming (including access to individual programs), the channel moved exclusively to that mode of distribution on March 22, 2026.
