= Tuvalu.TV =

Tuvaluan television channel

- Country: Tuvalu
- Broadcast area: Tuvalu
- Headquarters: Funafuti, Tuvalu

Programming
- Picture format: 1080i (HDTV)

Ownership
- Owner: Tuvalu Broadcasting Corporation

History
- Launched: 27 November 2019; 6 years ago

Tuvalu.TV is a Tuvaluan television channel that started in 2019. The station was set up by MMG Communications from New Zealand and started broadcasting at the end of 2019. The state broadcaster Tuvalu Broadcasting Corporation is responsible for the network, which up until its launch was only responsible for the local radio stations.

== History ==
Local television is not new to Tuvalu. An early experiment appeared after the failure of a foreign free-to-air operator, whose content appeared between the mid-1990s and 1998 when it shut down due to failure in the equipment and unsuccessful attempts at repairing. Shortly after this event, television was limited to Funafuti where the local service broadcast pre-recorded events such as fatele dances one hour a week. It's also reported that the Tuvalu Media Corporation set up a 20-watt transmitter in 1996, which as of 2002 was operating an experimental service for three to five hours a week.

When the Public Broadcasting Act 2014 was passed, TVBC, the operator of the upcoming television service, wastasked to provide five international channels and two national channels, all of which were free-to-air.

In early November 2019, Tuvalu.TV received the equipment to carry an 11 channel digital subscription television service, with the service scheduled to launch in December.

The first experimental broadcast of Tuvalu.TV was held on 27 November 2019 with the first live broadcast of a session of the Parliament of Tuvalu in a broadcast assisted by Papua New Guinea-based Richard Broadbridge, who is the head of Click Pacific. To prepare for this broadcast, which was a live stream on Facebook, staff from the Tuvalu Broadcasting Corporation was given a two-month period of training. The first news bulletin aired on December 6, 2019, one week after the first test. The station later opened formally on 16 December 2019 with an opening ceremony at 8:30am that day, followed by a parliamentary session at 10am.

Tuvalu.TV is the only free channel in the platform, while the other channels require a subscription. The launch of the channel came after a long history of attempts at starting a functional local service.

Tuvalu.TV joined the Pasifika TV network on 14 September 2023, enabling the channel to have access to the programme feed, as well as receiving technical support from New Zealand.
