= Rhodesia Television =

Television station operating in Southern Rhodesia

- Type: Television network
- Country: Rhodesia
- Availability: National
- Owner: Argus Newspapers and Davenport & Meyer
- Launch date: 1960 (as Rhodesia Television Limited)
- Dissolved: 1980; 46 years ago
- Former names: Federal Broadcasting Corporation

Rhodesia Television (RTV) was a live-broadcast, television station operating in Southern Rhodesia (now Zimbabwe) as a private company. It was established on the 14th of November, 1960, first in Salisbury (now Harare), with transmissions in Bulawayo beginning seven months later. It was only the fourth TV service in Africa after Algeria, Nigeria and Egypt, and the first such service in southern Africa, since South Africa did not introduce television until 1976.

After Rhodesia became Zimbabwe, RTV became ZBC TV.

== Rhodesia Television (Pvt) Ltd ==
RTV broadcast on behalf of the then Federal Broadcasting Corporation (FBC), with its major shareholders being South African companies, including the Argus Group of newspapers, parent company of the Rhodesia Herald, and Davenport and Meyer, which also operated LM Radio, based in Mozambique. Broadcasts started on 15 November 1960. RTV was funded by advertising, sponsored programmes and a television licence fee. Television reception was confined mainly to large cities, and most viewers were whites. In its first decade, broadcasts were received in Salisbury on channel 4 and Bulawayo on channel 3. Umtali (now Mutare) only received television in 1972, by which time it was estimated that more than 90 per cent of the white population had access to the service. By 1973, RTV was broadcasting 42 hours a week from three transmitters.

Before launching, there was skepticism over the types of programmes, but eventually it became a commercial success from the beginning, having sold all of its commercial airtime for its first year on air. Television sets were imported from Europe for the purpose, within two weeks from launch, there were an estimated 4,000 sets installed in Salisbury. By then, it was building its second television station in Bulawayo and was in the preliminary stages for a third one in the Copperplate area.

After Rhodesia's Unilateral Declaration of Independence (UDI) in 1965, the country was no longer able to openly purchase British or American television programs, but was able to continue obtaining them through other methods. By the early 1970s—when television in South Africa did not yet exist—50,000 televisions existed, ten times more per capita than in all of Africa.

As of 1975, television set ownership clocked in at 86% in Salisbury and 87% in Bulawayo, only among the white population. In April-May 1975, the most popular series were all American: Bonanza, The Mary Tyler Moore Show and Marcus Welby, M.D..

The station originally provided live monochrome news and entertainment and was instrumental in maintaining public morale after the nation's UDI and during the subsequent Rhodesian Bush War, when the country gained its independence. The first programming created for the majority black viewership was introduced when RTV was taken over by the Rhodesian government in 1976, becoming RBC TV, when the Rhodesia Broadcasting Corporation (RBC) initially acquired a 51 per cent stake in the service.

== Salisbury ==
Occupying a position high in the hills above the Salisbury racecourse, the Pockets Hill television station was built just a few metres away from its original 'Alexandra Palace-style' transmitter mast. This was later replaced by a much taller, guyed structure. The HQ of the Rhodesian Broadcast Corporation occupied the nextdoor building.

=== Engineering ===
Operating in a country under United Nations International Sanctions from 1965, which prevented free trade with the major broadcast manufacturers of the world, RTV electronic engineers had to be particularly resourceful to keep the station on air. This led to constant sanction busting by the directors to ensure that vital equipment could be replaced and that a good stock of spares and consumables could be maintained.

=== Programmes ===
The station initially operated 'live-to-air' as it had no facility for videotape recording. Imported light entertainment and documentary content was sourced from 16mm film and broadcast live from Rank Telecine units. As a result, in the early years, viewers were familiar with seeing the caption 'Please Do Not Adjust Your Set. Normal Programming Will Be Resumed As Soon As Possible' when the 'technical gremlins' upset the broadcast flow.

A small group of programme Producers and their Director/Vision Mixers organised weekly and sometimes daily studio productions. Transmissions opened at 17:00 and ran until just after the late-night news. The British national anthem would be broadcast at station opening and again at closedown.

The studio production crew most often consisted of three cameramen, a single audio operator and two African floor managers. There was also the small set design and creation team in the props area. On occasion, the station would host a broadcast from the Prime Minister, other government ministers, or foreign dignitaries, whereupon the studio staff would turn up in jackets and ties in stark contrast to the regular shorts and tee shirts.

As this was live TV, the crew would sometimes build a set at one end of the studio, in absolute silence, in readiness for an upcoming programme, whilst another completely unrelated live programme would be playing out at the opposite end of the studio. Pressures became even more complicated with the addition of live commercial breaks from the same studio area.

Its initial line-up largely consisted of old US series (The Life of Riley, The Jack Benny Show, The Loretta Young Theatre, Wagon Train, The Roy Rogers Show and Highway Patrol), employed the British advertising magazine concept (ten minutes), conventional spot advertising (every fifteen or thirty minutes) and refused sponsoring programmes. One viewer complained to the Evening Standard about the quality of the programmes, mostly second-rate American material, and the nasal accents, thinking they were unintelligible.

=== Studios ===
Based around a single studio and a small news and continuity announce booth, each studio was equipped with a complement of tungsten luminaires suspended from an overhead lighting grid and controlled by a small board of analogue dimmers. These luminaires included 2kw fresnel spot / key lights, 1kw 'scoop' fill lights and backlighting from banks of 5 Par38 type lamps. Microphones were connected on wall-mounted or multi-core terminated stageboxes. The latter being bulky (clumsy but indestructible) Philips connector strips.

Early monochrome cameras were mounted on three wheeled dollies, but these cameras were later replaced with RCA or Bosch monochrome cameras with image orthicon tubes, mounted on gas powered studio pedestals. The oldest camera was usually designated as Camera 3, with its turret of fixed focus lenses, delegated to holding wide shots and for shooting the caption stands. Cameras 1 and 2 had more useful zoom lenses, so were at the heart of programme production. These old cameras often ran very hot and were often operated with both side covers left open in an effort to assist with cooling. There was a mobile video monitor used not only for lighting reference, but also to provide a location for the studio countdown clock.

Audio foldback and talkback monitors were overhead above the lighting grid. There were caption stands for each camera to hold title captions, photographic images for news and simple commercial-designed images.

The cyclorama did not have an 'infinity curve' until the mid-1970s and was painted a basic pale blue, which equated to a mid to light tone grey for the monochrome cameras. On the unused studio wall were racks for camera and audio cables, as well as double-glazed viewing windows to connect the technical areas visually with the studio floor.

=== Control Room ===
One single room held production, vision mixing and audio mixing areas, with no partition. All cues were verbal although intercoms connected both video and audio desks with Studio, VT (video tape) and Telecine areas, as well as with the Master Control suite next door. Camera direction from the control room, in the very early days, was via a radio transmitter up in the lighting grid and with cheap domestic medium wave transistor radios strapped to the heads of the crew members. This system was replaced by cabled 'Cans' which plugged directly into the camera, receiving its signal from the multi-cored camera cable. Each camera was also able to talkback directly to the director if necessary.

The early vision mixing desks were rudimentary and home-built, in front of an array of wall-mounted CRT monitors. New vision mixing consoles were installed progressively, that could also provide basic dissolves and keying functions.

A Studer 12-channel stereo audio mixer was added to the sound mixing suite in 1972. This controlled a wrap-around console incorporating: two EMT broadcast turntables, two Ampex quarter-inch full-track tape recorder / players, and two Spot Master cartridge players for instant playback of theme music and stings. Microphones were mostly AKG D202 and Beyer M 201, with bulky RCA Lavalieres. A couple of AKG C414 and one Neumann U87 mic was added for higher quality use. There was only one handheld VHF Telefunken wireless microphone. This had a 50 cm long flexible antenna cable that would often be ripped off accidentally during transmission, causing an explosive cacophony of white noise.

=== Recording to videotape ===
Telecine content was upgraded with the coming of the videotape era in 1975, using man-sized RCA Quad video machines that consumed 10½" spools of 2" magnetic tape. These were still monochrome machines, but enabled advertisements to be inserted at will – lengthy pre-roll times permitting. These huge machines, operated by dedicated 'VT Girls', were the workhorses for recording of entire TV and current affairs programmes. As there was no post-production editing available on the Quad machines, all content had to be pre-compiled from the studio floor and control room.

Under the guise of RBC TV in 1976 the station joined the 'video cassette' era when Sony Umatic 'low band' recorders, cameras and an edit suite were installed. This in turn progressed to the 'high band' Umatic recorders and edit suite. In 1979 / 1980 the station took delivery of its first Sony 1-inch 'C Spool' edit suite – and the earliest content was shot and produced in colour, though still broadcast in monochrome. RTV was one of very few stations worldwide still broadcasting in black and white.

=== Telecine units, videotape and camera control ===
There were two Rank telecine units, each comprising: 16mm projector (optical and magnetic sound), 35mm slide carousels and epidiascope (for caption cards), transferring to video cameras. These units fed imagery to both the studio and transmission control areas, so both must always liaise closely to gain their use.

The VT room had four of the aforementioned Quad recorders where two girls usually operated and cued tapes for recordings or transmission. This room was heavily air conditioned to keep the machines cool and so it also housed the archive / main store for videotaped content. Contained also within this technical area were the camera control units or 'CCUs', where a duty engineer would manage the video signals from studio and telecine cameras.

=== The newsroom ===
A small group of studio newsreaders, location news reporters, film cameramen, office editors/scriptwriters and a duty director handled the day's latest events. Monochrome film, shot on 16mm cameras (Auricon, Bolex, Arriflex) would be developed on site in the station's film-processing laboratory and left in negative form. This was cut/edited by the director, and broadcast in this state by reversing the Black and White scanned imagery in telecine. This was a cheap but effective method. Such films were always mute in the early days, so commercial mood music would be played off acetate or vinyl discs to match the action or emotion. Music library discs were few and far between, so this music became very overused. At a later stage when the film department progressed to CP-16 cameras, the 16mm film also included a side-stripe magnetic audio track. In the final period before the advent of location video cameras and recorders, there was a period where 16mm 'reversal film' was shot for local content.

== Bulawayo ==
Facilities expanded to the second largest city, Bulawayo, in 1961. Set in Bulawayo's Montrose suburb, the television station was built on the city's highest point.

A single storey building housed offices, a canteen and kitchen; a secretarial/administrative office (two ladies) and a reception area. The heart of the building was dwarfed by the two-storey high studio block. An outdoor prefabricated canteen building was erected in 1976 and at the rear of the building, a concrete ramp led to the engineering workshop, another prefab construction. Adjacent to the studio, a props room housed programme sets, advertising materials and other sundries.

Staffing was typically as follows, though never exceeded 40 people. 1 x Station Manager, 2 x administrative staff, 1 x receptionist, 1 x night receptionist, Up to 5 engineers, 2 x transmission controllers, 2 x telecine operators, 3 x Video operators, 2 x newsroom staff, 1 x film cameraman/editor, 1 x cook, 2 x cleaners.

=== Programmes ===
Like Salisbury, the station initially operated 'live-to-air' as it initially had no facility for videotape recording. Imported light entertainment and documentary content was shared with the Salisbury studio and broadcast a day or two or week later.

A small group of 6 programme Producer / Directors were responsible for local, weekly and sometimes daily studio productions. using a mix of 8 camera / audio operators and 3 floor managers.

=== The Newsroom ===
Like all Montrose offices the newsroom was very small, perhaps 4,5m x 3m. Furnishings were basic. A desk for the news editor (Head of News) and a 'shelf desk' on an opposite wall used by two sub-editors/reporters/later bulletin directors. A film cameraman was responsible for processing and editing news film on an Intercine editing table. All local film was shot on 16mm negative which was converted to positive electronically, before transmission. Cameras used included a motor-driven Bolex, two clockwork Bolexes, and an Auricon sound camera which took 400' foot magnetic stripe film spools. It is probably safe to say that all programme producer/directors cut their teeth on studio news bulletins, of which a little more later.

All material was collated for use in three daily bulletins, being, 6pm headlines, a 7.45pm main bulletin and late news headlines. With the exception of lead stories, collation was as much as possible primed to geographical areas of the world to attempt to introduce a smoother 'flow' to the bulletin.

Other newsroom productions included a five-days-a-week 30-minute current affairs programme, The Tenth Hour, produced by the head of news and a weekly five-to-seven minute 'Crimecheck', produced in cooperation with the police.

Equipment in the newsroom was as basic as it could be: 3 x Olivetti manual typewriters, 2 x foot-pedal operated dictaphones, linked to a telephone to the Salisbury newsroom, 1 x 16mm projector to throw images onto a wall to enable checking/timing of daily footage, 1 x large filing cabinet containing 9" x 12" camera cards featuring images of most newsmakers and 2 x smaller cabinets holding slides and "opaques" (4" x 3" images of same). By the mid 70s electric typewriters and a telex machine had made the dictaphone system redundant.

Newsgathering From the early 60s up until about 1971, news was gathered and compiled in the following ways: 1. All the 'read to camera' stories and others not immediately available to Bulawayo were read over the telephone by someone in the Salisbury newsroom and recorded on to a dictaphone. 2. The duty sub would transcribe these stories on to (Byo) news format script paper, via a set of headphones. 3. Local stories were sourced over the telephone and/or filmed on location with the cameraman and the sub/reporter. 4. International film footage was obtained via Visnews and UPITN in London and was collected daily at the Bulawayo airport.

The main bulletin was read from the studio, using two newsreaders in front of a stylised map of the world. Two cameras were required. The headlines' bulletins were presented from a tiny news 'booth', just off the main corridor, which encompassed a fixed position camera, a desk and an AKG microphone. There was no autocue although some readers liked to write out the headlines and tape it just under the lens being used.

Visual resources The two reporter/subs were trained to direct studio bulletins. Two studio cameras, two cameramen, a floor manager and camcards. From telecine, film, slides, opaques, epidiascope images. VT inserts were introduced in the mid 70s and by 1979 a Sony ENG camera with shoulder pack was being utilised along with a new edit suite adjacent to a now downsized newsroom.

Audio resources A mixing console took feeds from studio mics, two vinyl turntables, an Ampex reel to reel tape machine and a single cassette player. The audio operator also had feeds from Sound on Film which might include spoken reports, Natural Sound on Film against which the studios would provide voice-over, and when film was silent, the newsroom would provide library music discs to be played against the film action, to lend mood.

Commercial Television Commercial Division RTV Bulawayo

International Television held the commercial marketing rights for the Bulawayo station until ITV's dissolution and takeover by Commercial Television, a wholly owned subsidiary of Rhodesia Television. The Bulawayo office was located in the city and was staffed by a small staff with a Manager, secretarial staff and a sales/copywriter. Most of the clients in Bulawayo were sourced from local retailers and manufacturers. The rate card structure of the Bulawayo station was identical to Salisbury with the same rules and time segments with rates adjusted pro rata based on the smaller viewing population in the Bulawayo transmission area. The production of advertising magazines (Ad Mags/Market Place) and other commercial spots was undertaken in the Bulawayo studio using RTV staff. Breakfast Television was pioneered in Bulawayo as an experiment. A live programme hosted by John Aldridge was on air for 5 hours once a week on a Saturday morning. However, the advertising support did not warrant a continuation or an extension of this service and it was eventually abandoned.

== Kitwe ==
Rhodesia Television started operating a third station in Kitwe, in what was then Northern Rhodesia, in 1961. Following the break-up of the Federation, it was detached from RTV and was renamed Northern Rhodesia Television (NRTV). When Northern Rhodesia became independent from the United Kingdom, it became Zambia Television and the RTV logo disappeared from its building.

Portuguese actor Victor Espadinha worked at the station in the NRTV period in 1964.

== Gwelo ==
Broadcasts to Gwelo (now Gweru) began in 1970. In 1971, the Salisbury station expanded to cover Gwelo and improved its coverage in the Rhodesian Midlands.

== Umtali ==
RTV opened a station in Umtali at 7pm on 16 December 1972 and was opened by Minister of Information, Immigration and Tourism P.K. van der Byl. It was essentially a relay station of RTV Salisbury.

== Outside broadcasts ==
=== The First Live Broadcast ===
The Bulawayo crew managed the first live outside broadcast in Rhodesia. It was a broadcast from the Rhodesian Grand Prix from the old Bulawayo airport (Brady Barracks). Achieved on a monochrome low-resolution surveillance camera and one Shibaden video recorder, the tiny camera was fitted with a very limited zoom lens that was operated with a small handle underneath, which also acted as the focus pull.

The camera was mounted on a luggage trolley "borrowed" from the Bulawayo train station. This was all hauled up three floors, onto the top of the old airfield control tower. The pictures were fed by cable from the camera down to the recorder (housed in the back of a Ford Taunus station wagon.) This had a transmitter and roof-mounted dish. With line of sight to the new microwave tower at the Bulawayo post office in Main Street, the signal was then sent into the studio in Montrose.

In the morning during practice, the cars were filmed going around from the bottom corner into the main straight. This 16mm film was made into a loop and used for fill during transmission. The luggage trolley/camera dolly caught the cars going up the main straight, whilst being pushed across the tower platform of around 4m. The presenter, Peter Rollason, stood out of the shot alongside the camera with a mic doing his commentary and would walk into the shot when required. The trolley was then pulled back again as the cars went down the back straight and onto the long corner sections all the way around and down to the corner at the bottom of the main straight. Here, the director back in the studio, cut to the film loop whilst the trolley was moved back to first position and all the cables were unwound. History does not relate if anyone noticed the loop of the same cars going around the bottom corner every lap.

=== Mobile Control Van ===
The Salisbury crew also took their studio cameras out on outside broadcasts from time to time. Unique to Salisbury Studios, was an Isuzu panel truck that had been converted as a mobile control vehicle for sound, vision and engineering. The annual Opening of Parliament was always covered along with important international games of rugby or cricket, the ballroom-dancing championships and the annual Trade Fair held in Bulawayo.

The unit was reliant on external 3-phase power, so it was never able to go off the grid too far. During the independence war, the Station produced an annual variety show, initially called the "Mayor's Christmas Cheer Show" to raise funds to assist various local charities. In later years these grew into the "Bless 'em All Troopie Shows" alternating annually from Salisbury and Bulawayo studios. The final Troopie Show was a nationwide tour over a two-week period. The variety of challenges thrown up by these recording venues would tax the fundamentally simple OB Van and its crew to its limits.

== Commercial television ==
At its inception RTV contracted an independent British/Rhodesian company, International Television (Pvt) Ltd (ITV), as its commercial managers. The company was headed by David Pinnel (Managing Director) and had registered offices in Salisbury, Bulawayo, Kitwe and Johannesburg. This agreement with ITV was terminated on 7 February 1968 and a new wholly owned subsidiary of RTV was formed known as Commercial Television (CTV) which absorbed all the ITV staff members. Managing director of the new company was John Terry and the Sales Director was Peter Lockitch, later to become Managing Director.

The broadcasting act stated that advertising content was not to exceed 10 minutes in every hour and commercial breaks during programmes were limited to a maximum of three per hour. Initially all commercials were supplied on 16mm film and were spliced into programme reels. To satisfy the retail market slide/camera card commercials with durations of 7 secs, 15 secs and 30 secs with pre-recorded voice over or live by the duty announcer were also broadcast during these breaks. Retail advertisers were also accommodated with an advertising magazine (Admag) programme broadcast live during early and later transmission times. Admags ran for a maximum of 10 minutes with a series of advertisers grouped into a mini programme. Programmes were hosted by a presenter and many of these presenters later went on to further their television careers hosting local TV programmes.

The introduction of video tape and the acquisition of United Film Industries, a local production house, later expanded the scope of the commercial capability and many additional innovations were introduced to further improve the scope of the commercial opportunity. The content of commercials was strictly enforced under a set of principles which had some interesting rules. For example, a toilet was not permitted to be featured in any visual presentation and the word toilet was prohibited in ad copy. Intimate female products were not permitted for advertising, along with any political advertising. Comparative advertising was also prohibited and competing products could not be transmitted in the same commercial break.

CTV employed a small team of copywriters, sales personnel and directors/producers to service both the advertising agencies and the local direct clients. A rate card divided into time segments was published each year and market research studies were conducted to determine viewership in each segment and region.

In a 1975 market research survey the peak adult viewership in the Salisbury/Midlands/Umtali region averaged 68,000 and in the Bulawayo region 25,000. Advertising cost based on a 30-second spot was approximately ZWD 1.00 per 1,000 viewers.

== CEOs ==
Officers included John Terry, David Pinnel, Peter Lockitch and Lin Mehmel. Commercial managers included Chris Callaghan, Jack Hobbs, Chris Holland and Gordon Mackenzie Kerr.

== Presenters ==
With a few exceptions, presenters were employed on a freelance basis: Adrienne Verney, Alan Britten, Alan Cockle, Alan Dickinson, Allan Riddell, Barry Taylor, Bernice Dixon, Beryl Maitland, Bill Franklin, Bob Nixon, Bob Ross, Bonnie van Rooyen, Brian Asch, Brian Cooper, Brian Lawson, Brian Williams, 'Cabby' Caborn, Carol Lynch, Mike Lindley, Clem Tholet, Dave Paterson, David Chodzko, Dave Emberton, Derek Partridge, Des Hamill, Dickie Arbiter, Donna Wurzel, Douglas Gordon, Edrice Royston, Elaine Gillespie, Fortinay Fowler, Frank Alnwaith, Frank Selas, Gail Adams, Gary Worth, Geoffrey Atkins, Gerry Wilmot, Glenn Irving, Gloria Mulliagan, Graham Ross, Ian Dixon, Ian Salmon, Ian Warren, Irene Harding, James Thrush, Jan Smith, Jill Baker, Jimmy Robinson, John Aldridge, John Batwell, John Bishop, John Pank, John Wooton (Wooty), Joy Cameron Dow, Ken Jackson, Lawford Sutton-Pryce, Len Rookes, Leslie MacKenzie, Leslie Sullivan, Libby Railton, Liz James, Mabel Anderson, Malcolm Russell, Margaret Kriel (Maggie Patrick), Mark Lukazinski, Martin Lee, Martin Locke, Mary Morgan-Davies, Mike Lindley, Mike Stewart, Mike Westcott, Nick Critchlow, Nigel Curling, Noreen Welch, Norman Bisby, Odilo Weger, Oliver Ransford, Pat Trevor, Patrick McLaughlin, Paul Tingay, Pauleen Bailey, Peter Bunkell, Peter Butler, Peter Evans, Peter Rollason, Peter Tobin, Peter van Aswegen, Peter Wilson, Ralph Glover, Ray Straker, Reg Salisbury, Rhys Meier, Rick Fenner, Bob Cushman, Rodney Gale, Rory Kilalea, Ross Campbell, Roy Brassington, Sally Donaldson, Sarah Thompson, Simon Parkinson, Sir Henry Gratten-Bellew, Sonia Hattin, Stan Higgins, Stan Trethowan, Stuart Dawes, Stuart Goakes, Ted Patterson, Terrence Kennedy, Toni Fairfield, Tony Adams, Tony Bulling, Tony Hitchman, Tony Oscroft, Trish Johns, Vic Mackeson, Vic Thomas, Viv Wilson, Wrex Tarr, Gerry Wilmot

== Locally produced programmes ==
These were called Bric-a-brac, Cabby, Culture Vulture, In Studio Minor, Juke Box Jury, National Foods High School Quiz, Nightcap, Pets Parade, Quirks and Quiddities, Sea Battles, Small Talk, Surf Pick-a-Box, Talkabout, Tele 5 Club, Wooty and Wonderama.

== RTV Community ==
A small community of ex-RTV staff keep in touch regularly. Most have gone on to successful careers in a wide range of industry-related spheres in many different countries. The Rhodesia Television page on Facebook (although currently a private group) remains highly active and shares a variety of anecdotes and photographs, keeping the RTV alive in modern times. Physical reunions have taken place in South Africa, UK, Australia and New Zealand with some members travelling many thousands of kilometres to rekindle their former relationships. The station now operates as Zimbabwe Television, the mouthpiece of the Zimbabwe Government.

== See also ==
- Embrafilme - A Brazilian film company that also closed down in response to change in political direction.
