= WALU-TV =

Former TV station in Palau

- Koror City, Koror; Palau
- Channels: Analog: 7 (VHF)
- Branding: Walu Television

Ownership
- Owner: Western Pacific Communications

History
- First air date: 1976
- Last air date: 1993

Technical information
- ERP: 0.1 kW

WALU-TV (also styled Walu Television in some sources) was Palau's first television station. Broadcasting on channel 7, it was available over the air but was encrypted. The station was owned by Western Pacific Communications.

== History ==
WALU-TV was set up in 1976 (some sources say 1974), with the licensing of two transmitters, one to be used by WALU and the other by a cable TV system broadcasting Japanese programs that ended in 1978. As of 1990, the owner of the station was a Palauan businessman, who was also a senator.

All of its programming throughout most of its existence came from videotapes flown in from Hawaii. For a brief period in its existence (1980–1981) a local newscast existed, but was discontinued when some of its staff resigned due to apparent salary disputes.

WALU-TV used a 100-watt transmitter delivering videotaped American programs. Subscribers were charged a monthly fee of US$15 to receive the programs. The signal was descrambled with a decoder, which in case of non-payment, could be deactivated and sent to WALU-TV's studios. The station's coverage area primarily targeted the states of Koror and Airai.

Programming in 1990 ran from 3 p.m. to midnight. The first hour consisted of children's programming, namely Sesame Street and some cartoons, followed by regular commercial programming until sign-off.

In 1993, the company was on the verge of bankruptcy. Since then, television was only delivered by cable—a company called Island Cable Television was set up in 1990.

By the 2000s, a subscription television company called STV was operating from a 0.1 kW transmitter in Ngermid on the frequency formerly housed by WALU. The station was manned by Ray Omelen.

== Notable staff ==
- Steven Kanai
- Sandra Sumang Pierantozzi (newswriting and live TV broadcasting; 1980)
