= ZFB-TV =

Television station in Hamilton, Bermuda

- Hamilton; Bermuda
- Channels: Digital: 19 (UHF); Virtual: 19
- Branding: ZFB TV 7

Programming
- Affiliations: 19.1: ABC

Ownership
- Owner: Bermuda Broadcasting Company Ltd.
- Sister stations: ZBM-TV

History
- Founded: 7 August 1965
- Former channel numbers: Analog: 8 (VHF, 1965–1988), 7 (VHF, 1988–2016); Digital: 20 (UHF, until 2017)

Technical information
- Licensing authority: Regulatory Authority of Bermuda (RAB)

Links
- Website: bermudabroadcasting.com

ZFB-TV (channel 7) is a television station in Hamilton, Bermuda, serving the British territory as an affiliate of ABC. It is owned by the Bermuda Broadcasting Company alongside CBS affiliate ZBM-TV (channel 9). The two stations share studios on Fort Hill Road in Devonshire Parish.

== History ==
In 1963, three companies applied for a second television station. A commission was set up to receive these applications. The companies were the Atlantic Broadcasting Company, owners of ZFB Radio, the Bermuda Broadcasting Company, owners of ZBM-TV and the Tele Radio Company, headed by television engineer Eugene Woods, who worked at ZBK-TV (channel 10, 1955 to 1959). Atlantic won the license and decided to renovate a property in Devonshire to accommodate both radio and television facilities.

ZFB-TV started its first broadcast on August 7, 1965 at 6:45 ADT, which was opened by acting governor, Hon J. W. Sykes. It was created after the merger of the two companies in the build-up to the start of its television broadcasts. Originally, the station broadcast on VHF channel 8. ZFB was the first of the two stations in Bermuda to use sound-on-film tape and also had its own newscast from the beginning. ZFB also brought US soap operas alongside ZBM, which initially aired in early evening timeslots, before moving to the afternoons.

In 1967, ZFB-TV started to mirror the U.S. TV format by introducing Saturday morning cartoons to its schedule. Colour television was introduced in November 1970, another first for the station. In 1977, it premiered Good Morning Bermuda, the first morning television programme in the territory, with features from ABC's Good Morning America. The following year, the station broadcast the first live satellite transmission, of the 1978 FIFA World Cup final.

In 1983, Capital Broadcasting Company merged with Bermuda Broadcasting Company, ending competition. A strike in 1984 led to a shutdown of both stations. After a change to the frequency plan passed by the government in 1987, ZFB moved to channel 7 in 1988 and resumed broadcasting that same year, after four years off air.

== Technical information ==
=== Subchannel ===
Subchannel of ZFB-TV
Channel	Res.	Short name	Programming
19.7	720p	ZFB	ABC

=== Analogue-to-digital conversion ===
On the week of 9 March 2016, Bermuda Broadcasting ended analogue broadcasts and converted ZFB-TV and ZBM-TV to digital using ATSC, with both services sharing a multiplex on channel 20. The transmitter was knocked out of service some time later when lightning struck the transmitter. In 2017, in time for the America's Cup, Bermuda Broadcasting completed an upgrade that added a second transmitter for ZFB, using virtual channel 19.7, allowing both ZFB and ZBM to broadcast in HD; it also replaced its radio transmitters.
