= Fréttir =

- Presented by: Bogi Ágústsson; Heiðar Örn Sigurfinnsson; Jóhanna Vigdís Hjaltadóttir; María Sigrún Hilmarsdóttir; Rakel Þorbergsdóttir; Sigríður Hagalín Björnsdóttir
- Country of origin: Iceland
- No. of episodes: n/a (airs daily)

Production
- Running time: ≈ 20 minutes
- Production company: RÚV

Original release
- Network: RÚV
- Release: 1966 – present

Fréttir (English: News), is the principal nightly television news program of the Icelandic public television channel RÚV. The program has been broadcast since the channel was launched in 1966.

The show aired every night at 19:00 and also at 22:00 on weeknights under the moniker Tíufréttir (English: 10:00 news). On 23 April 2025, RÚV announced its plans to stop broadcasting the 22:00 show and the regular news would be moved to 20:00 every night, starting from July 2025.
