= Tuvalu Broadcasting Corporation =

National broadcaster of Tuvalu

The Tuvalu Broadcasting Corporation (TVBC) is the current national broadcaster of Tuvalu, having replaced the Tuvalu Media Department in its role in 2015. The corporation is responsible for the radio stations inherited from the former TMC as well as the operations of Tuvalu.TV, founded in 2019.

== History ==
A new law was passed in 2014 (the Public Broadcasting Act 2014) which would be an independent entity from the government with the obligation of being neutral and impartial.

TVBC is an associate member of the Asia-Pacific Broadcasting Union and operates two radio stations. All of the programmes are carried in English and Tuvaluan languages.

TVBC is a partner of the Pacific Community's television newsmagazine The Pacific Way.

TVBC shot Simon Kofe's speech for the 2021 United Nations Climate Change Conference in November 2021.
