= María Sigrún Hilmarsdóttir =

- Born: June 30, 1979 (age 47); Reykjavík, Iceland
- Education: University of Iceland
- Occupations: News anchor and journalist
- Years active: 2005–present
- Employer: RÚV

María Sigrún Hilmarsdóttir (born 30 June 1979) is an Icelandic news anchor and journalist for RÚV. She has worked for RÚV since 2005.

In 2009 she directed the documentary Children for sale about children slavery in Cambodia.

== In film ==
In 2023, she appeared as herself in the action film Fast X. She has also appeared in the films Stormland and Amma Hófí.
