= Tuvalu Media Corporation =

Tuvalu Media Corporation (TMC) was a government-owned corporation established in 1999 to take over the radio and print based publications of the Broadcasting and Information Office (BIO) of the small Pacific Island nation of Tuvalu. However, in 2008 operating as a corporation was determined not to be commercially viable and the Tuvalu Media Corporation then became the Tuvalu Media Department (TMD) under the Office of the Prime Minister.

As the BIO, TMC and now the TMD, the organisation is the public broadcasting organisation in Tuvalu.

Melali Taape is the General Manager of the Tuvalu Media Department (2015).

The Tuvalu Broadcasting Corporation took its place in 2015.

== Radio Tuvalu ==
The Tuvalu Media Department operates one station on the AM frequencies under the name Radio Tuvalu, which broadcasts from the main atoll of Funafuti since 14 August 1975. In 2011 the Japanese government provided financial support to construct a new AM broadcast studio. The installation of upgraded transmission equipment allows Radio Tuvalu to be heard on all nine islands of Tuvalu. The new AM radio transmitter on Funafuti replaced the FM radio service to the outer islands and freed up satellite bandwidth for mobile services.

The station broadcasts Tuvaluan programming 3 times a day. Transmission hours are: in the morning: 6:30am – 8:00am; afternoon: 11:25am – 1:00pm; evening: 6:25pm – 10:00pm. When Radio Tuvalu is off the air, programming from the BBC is transmitted.

Radio Tuvalu provides special broadcasts during general elections, such as during the 2015 Tuvaluan general election.

== Print publications ==
Tuvalu Echoes was a fortnightly newspaper published from 1983 by the BIO and subsequently by the TMC. Publication was in English and Tuvaluan, with the newspaper in an A4-sized format. Sikuleo o Tuvalu was a newsletter in the Tuvaluan language that was first published in 1983. Publication was hampered by the printer breaking down and lack of paper and ink and these publications were closed down in 2007.

Fenui – news from Tuvalu is a free digital publication of the Tuvalu Media Department that is emailed to subscribers and operates a Facebook page, which publishes news about government activities and news about Tuvaluan events, such as a special edition covering the results of the 2015 general election.
