= TVRI Dili =

- Country: Indonesia
- Broadcast area: Dili, East Timor
- Network: TVRI (1978–1999)

Programming
- Language: Indonesian
- Picture format: 480i 4:3 SDTV

Ownership
- Owner: TVRI

History
- Founded: 1978
- Launched: 16 July 1978
- Closed: September 1999; 26 years ago
- Replaced by: TV UNTAET

TVRI Dili (officially known in Indonesian as TVRI Stasiun Dili) was a regional television station that once broadcast in Dili, East Timor (now Timor-Leste) while it was a province in Indonesia. The station was owned and run by TVRI, which at that time had the status of a directorate under the country's Department of Information.

== History ==
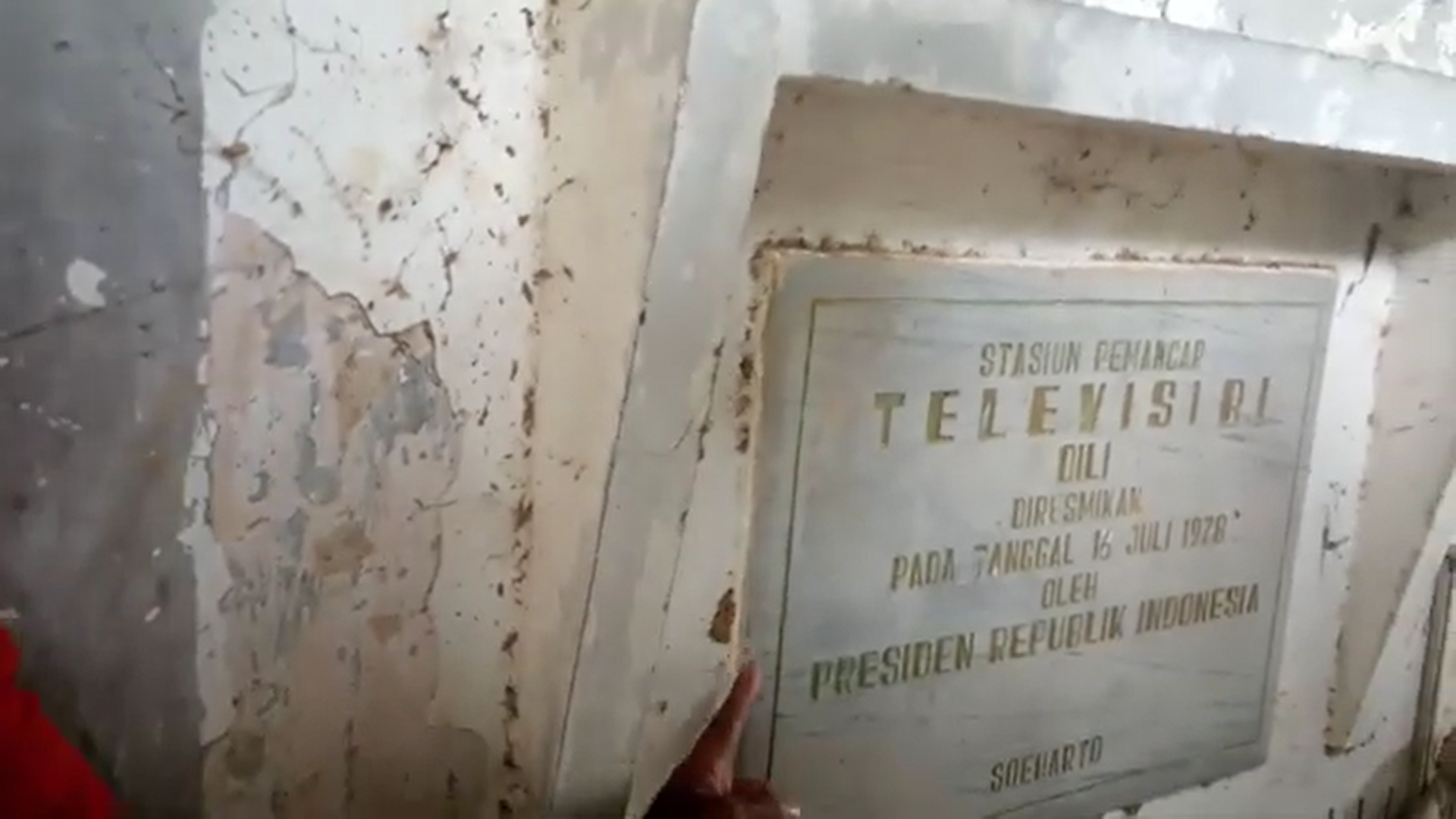
Inscription of the inauguration of TVRI Dili station at the former TVRI Maribia building, Dili

The station was inaugurated as a relay station in Maribia, Dili on 16 July 1978 during the first visit of Suharto to Dili. After Dili, relay stations were established in Maliana, Baucau, Lospalos, Suai, Viqueque, and Oecusse in 1979-1980 and 1982–1983. TVRI's presence preceded that of RRI, which established a radio station in Dili in 1981.

On 10 June 1980, TVRI Dili was attacked by a group of troops from Fretilin. The attack was carried out in the early hours of the morning. It was successfully neutralized by the East Timor Regional Police Mobile Brigade, but two police officers were killed.

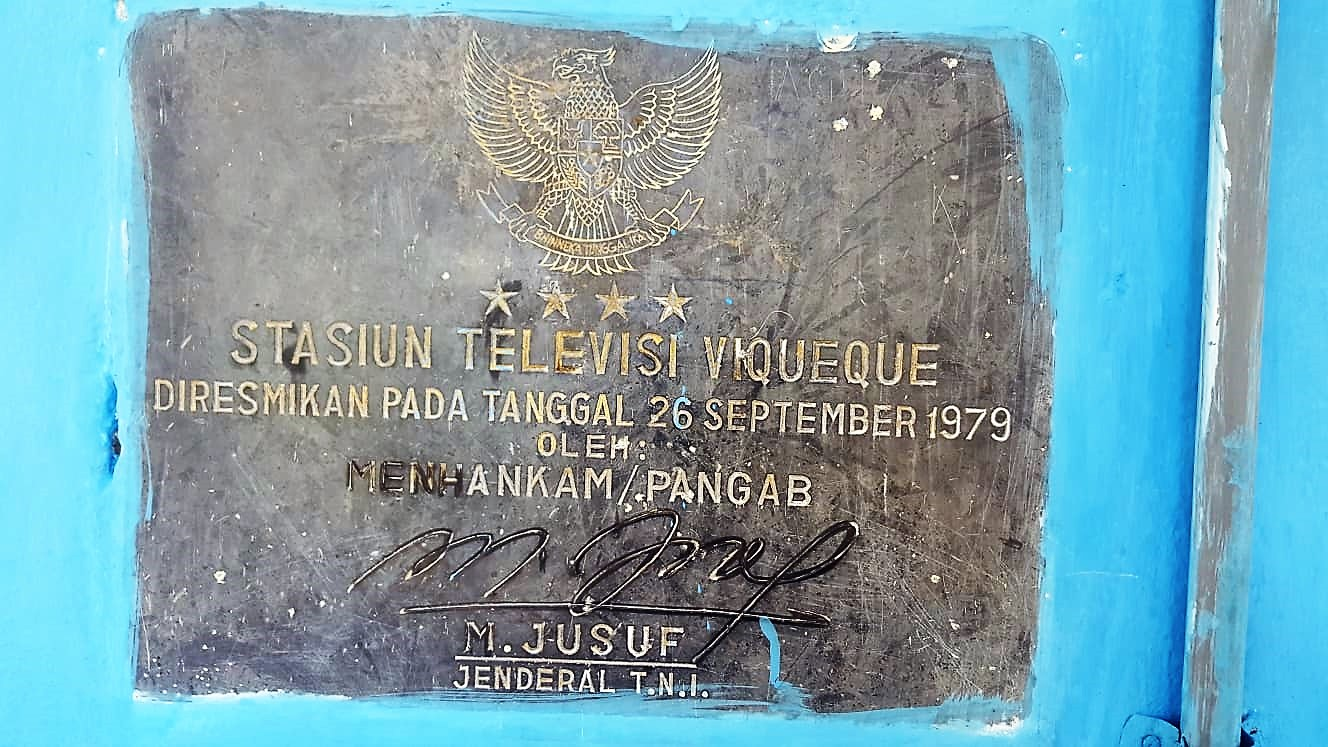
An inauguration inscription previously used by the TVRI transmission station in Viqueque installed in 1979, now a broadcasting station for local radio, Rádio Povo Viqueque

TVRI Dili also broadcast via satellite. However, according to a Kompas Daily report on 25 May 1999, in December 1998 TVRI Dili stopped broadcasting via satellite due to budget limitations. This was seen as hampering the then-upcoming referendum, where the station was expected to promote the autonomy option.

RRI Dili closed broadcasts on 23 September 1999. TVRI Dili closed its broadcasts afterwards, but it is believed that it was before ABRI troops began to withdraw from East Timor on 24 September 1999 due to the referendum results. The exact closing date is not known.

RTTL, Timor Leste's national radio and television broadcaster, whose broadcasts began in 2002, is believed to be the "successor" to TVRI Dili, utilizing its remaining former assets. The equipment used by TVRI Dili in the RTTL office is still used, such as the uplink satellite dish and the box generator. The TVRI tower in Maribia, which was the forerunner of TVRI in Bumi Lorosae, is no longer used, although the building and tower remains.

The former TVRI transmission station in Viqueque is used by a local radio station, Rádio Povo Viqueque. It is not known whether the former TVRI tower survives.

== Programming ==
Until May 1999, TVRI Dili was known to broadcast 90 minutes of local broadcasts per week, namely every Monday, Wednesday and Friday for 30 minutes (18.00-18.30 WITA). The rest was relay broadcasts from TVRI's central station.
