= Armed Forces Radio and Television Service Keflavik =

Armed Forces Radio and Television Service Keflavik or AFRTS Keflavik (formerly Radio TFK) or Kanaútvarpið/Kanasjónvarpið or Keflavíkursjónvarpið, as it was commonly called by Icelanders, was the radio station of the US Armed Forces at the Naval Air Station Keflavík station in Suðurnes, which operated from 1951 to 2006 when the military base was closed.

The station's defined mission was to send out entertainment to uplift American soldiers and military personnel at the military bases in Iceland. The program of the station was based primarily on popular American radio and television content, but part of the program was special informational programs produced by the Pentagon, which seemed to have some propaganda undertones. The station also produced its own content, mainly news and weather reports. The station was part of the Armed Forces Network radio network that operates on US military bases around the world. The operator of the station was the Navy Media Center (NMC) Broadcasting Detachment in Keflavík, but most of the content was obtained from AFRTS, which was in charge of purchasing and producing content.

When the station was closed in September 2006, 25 people worked there, including three Icelandic technicians.

== Radio broadcasts ==
The station began broadcasting on medium wave with a power of 25 watts in November 1951 and then received permission from the Icelandic government to operate a radio station 24 hours a day in May 1952. At the same time, the power was increased to 250 watts and the station was always one of the most powerful in a large area around Iceland. Previously, the US Army had operated a radio station at Keflavík Airport during the Second World War. The radio station broadcast continuously from 1952 to 2006.

== Television broadcasts ==
On February 15, 1954, the station applied for a license for a television station, in order to keep the servicemen on the installation. It then received the license for television broadcasting on March 4, 1955 (some sources believe the license was received on March 1), with regular broadcasts starting on March 17. It was broadcast on the frequency 108-186 Hz in a 345° beam. Due to differences between frequencies and standards, Icelanders either modified their sets or received the television station via its FM signal. These were the first television broadcasts from Iceland, eleven years before RÚV began broadcasting. The license was subject to the conditions that the power of the broadcast was limited to 50 watts and an attempt was made to direct the beam to the station itself. Because the case was not considered to affect Icelandic interests, Minister of Foreign Affairs Kristinn Guðmundsson did not bring the case before Alþingi.

It soon became clear that the TV signal from the station was received in Suðurnes, Hafnarfjörður and Reykjavík, and various people got hold of TV receivers and TV antennas to be able to follow the station's program. Reykjavík was just 56 kilometers (35 miles) away from Keflavík and was able to receive the signal well. The receivers were expensive and therefore few households could afford such a luxury, but the viewing has probably been greater than the number of devices indicated due to group viewing of popular programs. By 1960, the transmitter's power increased, enabling a larger reach and concerns about an American cultural invasion in the coverage area.

== The dispute over Keflavík television ==
In 1959, two members of the People's Alliance presented a proposal to close the television station, but it was not accepted. On March 13, 1961, the station applied for the broadcasting power to be increased from 50w to 250w, and that permission was granted on April 17. When the station increased its broadcast grant the following year, the issue came up again in Alþingi. The MP from the Progressive Party then criticized that the Minister of Foreign Affairs had given a foreign television station a de facto monopoly on television broadcasting in Iceland. The issue was even more painful as Icelandic television had not yet been established despite discussions about its necessity for almost a decade. The Danish National Broadcasting Company had started television broadcasting in 1951.

The controversy flared up after this, and on March 13, 1964, sixty well-known Icelanders published an article calling on the Icelandic government to limit the station's broadcasts, so that "the issue [of the establishment of Icelandic television] can be developed in accordance with the will and capacity of the people, without undue coercion". Opponents of the station were, among other things, worried that Icelandic youth would be exposed to "unwanted" cultural influences and even lose the Icelandic language. However, many people came to the defense of Keflavík TV, and over 14,000 people signed a petition requesting that the station be allowed to continue broadcasting in Iceland. Theoretically, for the development of national television in Iceland, it was more nationalistic to "watch Vikings killing each other than cowboys killing Indians".

== Programming ==
The Keflavik station in 1964 received kinescopes of American commercial television programs from the main AFRTS facilities in Los Angeles, which were later sent to bases with operational stations. In Keflavik, local programming was extremely limited, as no trained technicians existed at the time.

In spite of these limitations, there was an abundance of local productions. Local news bulletins were simulcast on both radio and TV at 7pm and 11pm; both bulletins lasted fifteen minutes.

== Limitation of television broadcasts ==
When RÚV started broadcasting in 1966, the producers of television content in the United States expressed the opinion that the defense forces' television station should pay similar fees for the broadcast of purchased content, since the audience in Iceland was larger than that of the defense station itself. Following that, the fleet commander requested the Icelandic government to significantly reduce the station's broadcast power so that it was limited to the station and its immediate vicinity, as the station's operating costs would otherwise have multiplied. On September 15, 1967, television broadcasts were limited so that they could only be received in Suðurnes and the southern part of Hafnarfjörður. The program of the station was e.g. published in regional newspapers in Suðurnes until 1972. According to surveys, the station's program was found in sections in many parts of Reykjavík. This is how broadcasts continued until 1974 when all of the station's television broadcasts were moved to a cable system.

On November 16, 1969, 22 members of the Youth Front (Æskulýðsfylkingin - later merged into the People's Alliance) stormed the television station's studio, painted "Che Guevara" and "Viva Cuba" on the walls and on cameras, and shouted anti-Vietnam war slogans ("Vietnam will win"). The group included, among others, Birna Þórðardóttir and Róska.

Between 1972 and 1974, articles appeared regularly in Icelandic newspapers that Keflavík TV was breaking Icelandic broadcasting laws with its broadcasts, as those laws stipulated the exclusive right of the National Broadcasting Corporation to broadcast television. On the other hand, many people complained about the restrictions on the reception of the television station.

In November 1974, there was a lot of controversy in the parliament about Albert Guðmundsson's motion for a parliamentary resolution, which discussed, among other things, the opening of towns for Keflavík TV broadcasts. The proposal was rejected with 40 votes against 5, and thus it is clear that there was a cross-political consensus for its closure.

In 1975, closed-circuit cable broadcasts started, the old transmitter was shut down in 1977, when the cable network had reached all corners of the base.

== Color and satellite TV ==
In 1976, color broadcasts were introduced. The cable system introduced at the time had up to twelve possible channels and a broad FM selection. Three additional channels were carried over time: a base weather channel, a channel for entertainment programs and a community information channel that occasionally aired movies. RÚV's television service was excluded due to a lack of an agreement with the corporation and concerns over licence fees. On May 2, 1983, the Keflavik base joined AFRTS's SATNET system. With its launch, newscasters no longer awaited for shipments of footage coming from ABC World News Tonight and UPI's video wire service. ABC World News Tonight was carried at 11:30pm in this arrangement, followed by the NBC Nightly News at midnight. AFN Prime still does this arrangement with the four main American newscasts, airing back-to-back.

In the 1990s, TV content from satellites began to be rebroadcast in the cable system, which eventually counted 40 TV channels and 11 radio channels. The on-base cable service carried the AFN channels, Iceland's national channel, Christian channel Omega, SkjarEinn and European channels.
