= ZBK-TV =

American television station in Hamilton, Bermuda (1955–1959)

ZBK-TV (channel 10) was a television station broadcasting out of Kindley Air Force Base in Bermuda, owned by the Armed Forces Radio and Television Service between 1955 and 1959. It was the first television station of any kind on the island.

== History ==
On July 4, 1955, ZBK-TV started broadcasting. It was the sixth overseas AFRTS television station, operating using a 100-watt transmitter manufactured by Dage.

Due to an agreement between the British and American governments, the station was unable to have a signal covering the whole island. The signal reached St. George's, Tucker's Town and a few isolated spots as far away as Harrington Sound, in the vicinity of Flatts. Locals acquired television sets in order to receive the signal from the base, to an extent where owners of sets regularly invited their neighbors to watch its programming, which consisted of American TV series. It was originally intended to be an island-wide service with government permission, but it was not viable, as the American TV footage was reserved only for military forces and their dependents, not for civilian audiences. There were also plans by AFRTS engineers to reduce the power of the transmitter to the base.

The affair with ZBK-TV caused the Bermuda Broadcasting Company to set up its own television station, ZBM-TV, broadcasting on the same frequency, on January 13, 1958. It was determined that ZBK-TV continued broadcasting in the afternoons, with ZBM broadcasting its island-wide television service in the evenings. ZBK-TV ultimately shut down in 1959.
