= Radio-Televisão Timor Leste =

National broadcaster in Timor-Leste

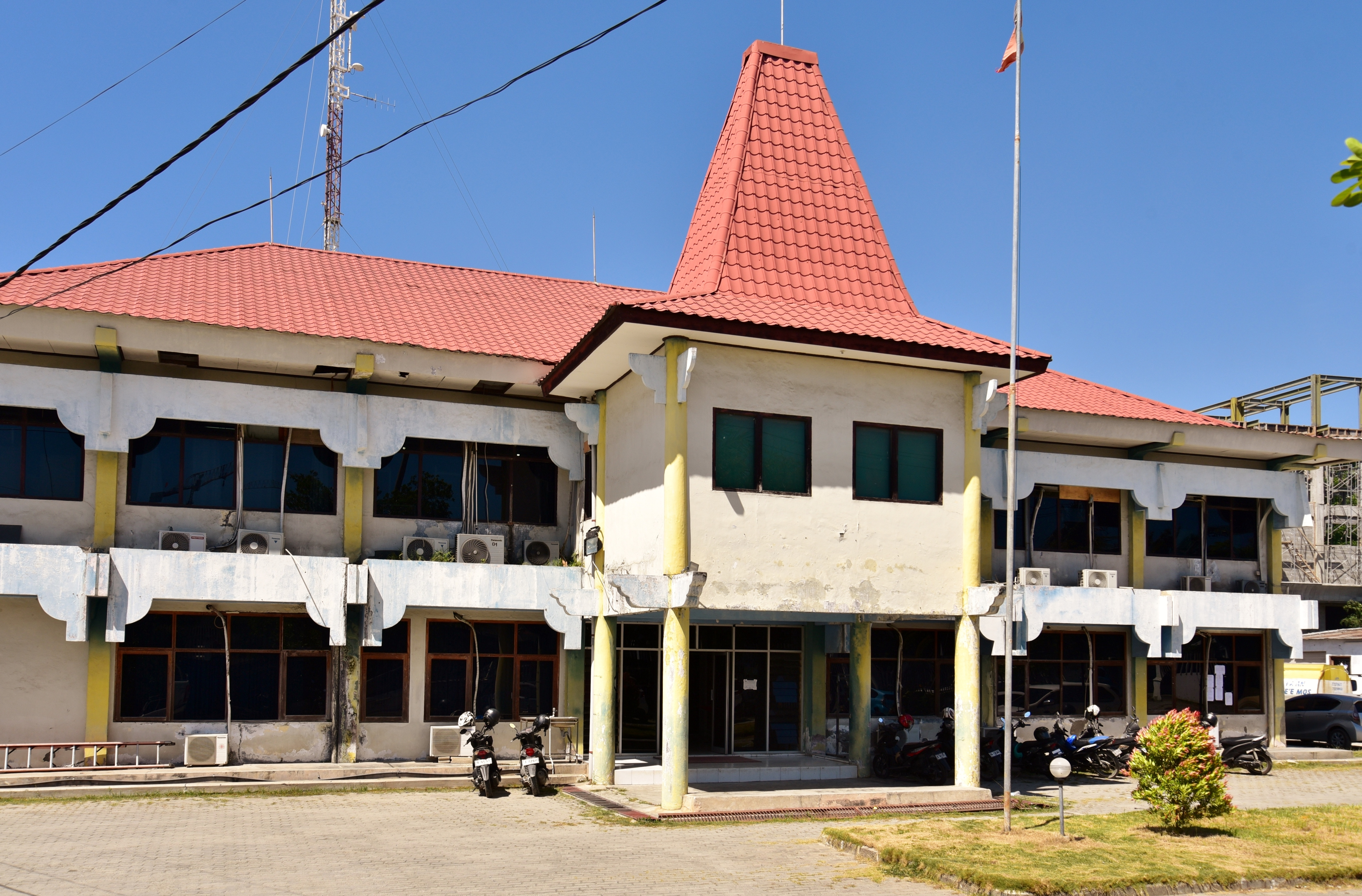
- RTTL headquarters in Dili
- Type: Broadcast radio and television network
- Availability: Nationwide
- Motto: Roman ba Nasaun (Tetum for "The Light of the Nation")
- Headquarters: Dili, Timor-Leste
- Broadcast area: Timor-Leste; Indonesia (West Timor, East Nusa Tenggara)
- Owner: Government of Timor-Leste
- Launch date: 1 June 2002; 24 years ago
- Former names: TVRI Dili (1978–1999)
- Official website: www.rttlep.tl
- Language: Tetum; Portuguese; Indonesian; English

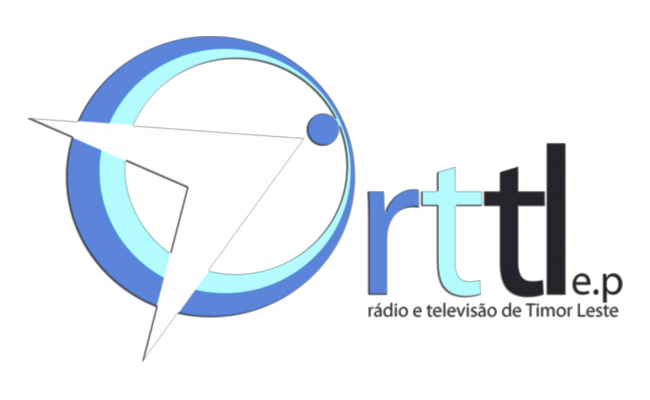
RTTL's fifth and previous logo

Radio e Televisão de Timor-Leste, E.P. (RTTL, Tetun: Rádiu Televisaun Timor Leste, Radio and Television of Timor-Leste in English) is the national state radio and television broadcaster in Timor-Leste.

== History ==
With the independence of Timor-Leste, Rádio UNTAET and Televisão UNTAET were created in 2000. On 1 June 2002, RNTL and TVTL were created, days after its independence. 90% of the country's population received its signals, while television was only receivable by 30%, mostly in Dili.

== Radio ==
The radio branch of RTTL is known as Radio Timor Leste (RTL), which broadcasts in Tetum and Portuguese. Radio Timor Leste is broadcast 16 hours a day with 34 programs locally produced by a staff of 63. Seven percent of RTL's programmes come from outside producers, including non governmental organizations and agencies.

RTL has 4 departments to support its daily operation: News, Programming, Technical, and the Department of Promotion, External Production and Research.

RTL Director Mr Rosario Da Graca Maia also serves as the Head of International Relations of Timor Lorosae'e Journalist's Association - TLJA. He has received an Australian Leadership Award and he's the Young International Analyst and Alert coordinator for the Southeast Asia Press Alliance - SEAPA

Radio Timor Leste can be reached on FM frequency in Dili 91.7 and different frequency in every District. RTL has AM frequency on 684. RTL has a plan to open up a new Channel called Antena 2 targeted youth and possibility to attend advertisement as the institution base on decree law 48/2008 became as empresa publica (public company).

Base on the survey done by East Timor Insight, Radio Timor Leste as a major channel of information and has a widest coverage of the population.

== Television ==
The television division of RTTL is known as Televisão de Timor Leste or Televizaun Timor Lorosae (Timor-Leste Television), abbreviated as TVTL. Its schedule consists of some locally made programs in Tetum, as well as relay of news programmes and others from RTP Mundo. In the past it occasionally broadcast a few programmes from ABC Australia, and BBC World News. In September 2008, it signed an agreement with Brazil's TV Globo, allowing its access to that channel's programming until year-end 2014, in a package worth 3,000 hours of content. The package started with the 2006 version of Sinhá Moça, and by the end of 2009 planned to air non-telenovela formats, A Diarista, A Grande Família, Malhação and Sítio do Pica-Pau Amarelo.

TVTL began broadcast in 1978, first as the East Timor station of TVRI and was later renamed as TV UNTAET. Following independence on 20 May 2002, it adopted its present name. It absorbed the former TVRI transmitter on channel 7, as well as having a relay station on channel 12 in Baucau.

Since 2025, it carries Australian programs from PacificAus TV.

== See also ==
- Telecommunications in Timor-Leste
