= Bermuda Broadcasting =

Broadcasting company in Bermuda

The Bermuda Broadcasting Company Ltd. is a commercial, for-profit broadcasting company located in Bermuda. Sometimes abbreviated locally as "BBC", the Bermuda Broadcasting Company is not related to the BBC, the UK's public broadcasting company. The company was founded in the 1950s and grown to be the largest broadcasting company in Bermuda. It was chaired by Fernance B. Perry, a prominent entrepreneur in Bermuda, until his death.

== Broadcast stations ==
The Bermuda Broadcasting Company's radio stations and TV stations use the call letters "ZFB" and "ZBM". The ZBM call sign has been in use since 1953 for an AM radio station, since 1962 for an FM radio station, making it one of the oldest in Bermuda. Beginning in 1958, the call sign was use for the first Bermudian television station. ZFB was originally the call sign for the radio and TV stations of the Capital Broadcasting Company from 1965 to 1984.

== Labour unrest ==
In 2009, a strike by 40 unionized employees in April 2009, halted all programming at the company's radio and television stations for four days. Perry said that changes in work rules and staff pay were needed "to help a financially ailing company". The work stoppage was settled, and normal operations resumed on 21 April, after government mediation.

== Radio ==
- Bermuda Spirit, formerly ZFB, on 1230 kHz (transmitter power: 1 kW), It is a general mix of local, religious, adult contemporary formats.
- ZFB-FM (branded as "Power95 Stereo FM") on 94.9 MHz (ERP: 1 kW) on air since 1971, broadcasting in the urban/reggae format.
- ZBM on 1340 kHz (transmitter power: 1 kW). It started broadcasting in 1953, and the station's format is news and talk, with some music programming.
- ZBM-FM (branded as "Ocean89") on 89.1 MHz (ERP: 15 kW), broadcasting since 1962. Its specific format is the adult contemporary format.

== Television ==
- ZFB-TV, virtual channel 20.2 (UHF digital channel 20), is the affiliate station for ABC; however, when ZFB used to be part of the Capital Broadcasting Company, the TV station broadcast on VHF channel 8.
- ZBM-TV, virtual channel 20.1 (UHF digital channel 20), is the affiliate station for CBS; however, when ZBM originally began broadcasting in 1958, it used to be on VHF channel 10. Both channels are currently carried on Bermuda's cable television system.

== See also ==
- Caribbean Broadcasting Union
