= AFN Spectrum =

- Country: United States
- Broadcast area: United States military bases and family homes via IPTV distribution
- Headquarters: Riverside, California, U.S.

Programming
- Language: English
- Picture format: 1080i (HDTV)

Ownership
- Owner: American Forces Network
- Sister channels: List: AFN Prime; AFN News; AFN Sports; AFN Sports 2; AFN Movie; AFN Family

History
- Launched: March 27, 1997; 29 years ago
- Closed: March 22, 2026; 5 months ago (via satellite)

Links
- Website: MyAFN

Availability limited to U.S. military personnel in military bases

Streaming media
- AFN Now: AFN Spectrum

AFN Spectrum is an American Forces Network, which was the service's third permanent television channel, before becoming exclusive to AFN Now in 2026, an IPTV streaming service. It started in 1997 as more of a conservative culture-oriented channel with programming from cable networks and classic TV series. In a way, it mimicked the "superstation" concept from cablecasters TBS and WGN America. However, the Spectrum lineup currently contains more conventional programming, like American Idol and Ugly Betty, as some of the public television and classic fare that made up Spectrum is being reduced but remain the primary constant on the channel.

== History ==
AFN launched Spectrum on March 23, 1997. In its early years the channel ran on an eight-hour wheel with documentaries, cartoons, classic TV series and movies. The launch of the channel came after that of NewSports.

In 2003, with the announcement of the launch of AFN Movie and AFN Family for 2004, AFN Spectrum would reduce its movie and family programming as consequence. The move enabled Spectrum to increase its cultural output. The channel had absorbed all of the shows that were deemed "objectionable" by AFN Prime.

With AFN services moving from satellite distribution to IPTV streaming (including access to individual programs), the channel moved exclusively to that mode of distribution on March 22, 2026.
