= CSL-TV =

Television station in the Azores, 1954–2011

CSL-TV was the callsign of a television station operated by the American Forces Network in the Lajes Field in the Azores. The station was the first regular television station under the aegis of the AFRTS, being founded in 1954. It last operated in 2011, by then acting as a relayer of AFN Prime Atlantic.

== History ==
Up until 1954, the US Armed Forces exclusively provided radio broadcasts. Plans to introduce a television station were proposed to Gen. Curtis E. LeMay to boost morale for servicemen in US Air Force bases.

To this end, AFRS was renamed AFRTS on 21 April 1954. CSL-TV became the first television station set up by them, and started broadcasting on 17 October 1954, after receiving a permit from the Portuguese Government. The station was the first television station of any kind in Portugal (two and a half years before RTP started regular broadcasts) and the Azores (nearly 21 years before the start of RTP Açores). Until its launch, Portuguese people had never seen television before. In theory, it was the second AFN station overall (after the first experiment at Loring Air Base in December 1953), in practice, it was the first in a series of stations catering overseas bases. Lajes was selected as a "proving ground" for television broadcasts due to its relative isolation. The government dictated that television sets were limited to U.S. and Portuguese military personnel, as there was no Portuguese TV available locally in the area. Television receivers were heavily controlled and were registered like firearms. Equipment was provided by the DAGE company on the cheap, which was inadequate for broadcasting.

The station broadcast on VHF channel 8 using a low-power transmitter and an ERP of 30 watts (50 watts in some sources). Following the Limestone Air Base 20-watt experiment, it was determined that all AFRTS television stations would operate on low-powered transmitters. CSL's transmitter signal covered a radius of 3.5 miles from the transmitter to the shore line. The station broadcast seven hours a day on average.

CSL-TV moved to new facilities in mid-1958 on a hilltop overlooking the Atlantic Ocean and the base. The station also started using kinescopes while other stations in the AFRTS circuit were starting to air videotaped content.

As of 1964, the station was operating daily from 6pm to midnight. It also produced a live evening newscast with pictures sourced from newspapers and magazines rather than film. At the time, it was one of the seven stations in the USAFE tri-continental network. Programming was received in tapes from the United States until the entrance of the station to the AFRTS SATNET system. The station had two newscasts, a half-hour bulletin at 6pm with news coming from the United States, as well as sports and a local weather forecast; but news about the Azores and Portugal were few to none. One of the few cases where CSL-TV did cover a local event was during an earthquake that almost destroyed the island in 1980. CSL-TV joined the SATNET system in November 1983, enabling live coverage.

The station used to have a tremendous influence on the local Portuguese population in Praia da Vitória, alongside other imported goods that were available there first before the rest of the country.

A SATNET dish was added in November 1983, enabling the base to have access to live news and sports; becoming the first overseas base to do so, after an experimental service was tested in 1982.

Over-the-air broadcasts ended in 2011 due to its old age and inconvenient location; the building was torn down in November. 2015 was marked by the reduction of the contingent of American military staff working at the base.

Currently the base is served by an internal closed-circuit cable system limited to personnel, carrying the eight AFN channels, a radio station and a community channel.
