= AFN News =

- Country: United States
- Broadcast area: United States military bases
- Headquarters: Riverside, California, U.S.

Programming
- Language: English
- Picture format: 1080i (HDTV)

Ownership
- Owner: American Forces Network
- Sister channels: List: AFN Prime; AFN Spectrum; AFN Sports; AFN Sports 2; AFN Movie; AFN Family

History
- Launched: January 1, 1997; 29 years ago

Links
- Website: MyAFN

Availability limited to U.S. military personnel in military bases

Streaming media
- Affiliated Streaming Service: AFN Now

AFN News is a rolling-news channel providing news from all major news outlets. Programming consists of relays of news and current affairs programming seen on US over-the-air and cable networks.

== History ==
The predecessor of the capacity currently used by AFN News was SATNET, created by the AFRTS in 1978. Test transmissions started in December of that year, eventually replacing the old Television Priority (TPA) packages sent to bases. Regular broadcasting started in 1982, first to Guantanamo Bay, Roosevelt Roads and Panama; then to the joint US-UK military base at Diego Garcia and Keflavik, with the 17 hours of scheduled programming stripped of advertising (or replaced by public service announcements) before transmission.

The channel started broadcasting on January 2, 1997, as NewSports, replacing the former SATNET service. The channel provided live and tape-delayed news programming as well as primarily tape-delayed sports broadcasts for nine hours on weekdays and twenty hours on weekends. The launch of the channel came as part of a three-phased plan to improve the quality of AFN television broadcasts by starting delivery of signals using digital technology, enabling the creation of more channels.

On August 7, 2001, the channel became AFN News after sports coverage was spun off onto a new AFN Sports channel.

The schedule changed on December 5, 2004 in order to add more live programming. Some programs from the OTA networks moved to AFN Prime while Channel One News moved to the newly launched AFN Family.
