= ZBM-TV =

Television station in Hamilton, Bermuda

- Hamilton; Bermuda
- Channels: Digital: 20 (UHF); Virtual: 20
- Branding: ZBM TV 9 (general); ZBM 9 News (newscasts)

Programming
- Affiliations: 9.1: CBS

Ownership
- Owner: Bermuda Broadcasting Company Ltd.
- Sister stations: ZFB-TV

History
- Founded: 13 January 1958
- Former channel numbers: Analog: 10 (VHF, 1958–1982), 9 (VHF, 1982–2016)

Technical information
- Licensing authority: Regulatory Authority of Bermuda (RAB)

Links
- Website: bermudabroadcasting.com

ZBM-TV (channel 9) is a television station in Hamilton, Bermuda, serving the British territory as an affiliate of CBS. It is owned by the Bermuda Broadcasting Company alongside ABC affiliate ZFB-TV (channel 7). The two stations share studios on Fort Hill Road in Devonshire Parish.

== History ==
Channel 10 was first occupied in 1955 by ZBK-TV, an AFRTS station broadcasting out of the Kindley Air Force Base. Due to an agreement between the British and American governments, the station was unable to have a signal covering the whole island. The introduction of television led to Bermudians with television sets setting up makeshift antennas to receive the signal, that they were not allowed to own at the time. ZBK was plagued by controversies regarding its signal and its status. The government made a decision to grant a television license to ZBM.

ZBM-TV was founded in January 1958 by Bermuda Broadcasting Company as the first local television station in Bermuda. Before then, residents living near Kindley Field at the East End of Bermuda could watch television via unauthorized reception of the TV signal on base. It was determined that ZBK's broadcasting hours were to be limited to the afternoon, with ZBM airing in the evenings. Programmes were obtained from U.S. television networks as well as providers and producers from Canada and the UK. ZBK-TV eventually shut down in 1959, enabling ZBM to gain complete operational control of the channel.

The station affiliated with CBS in 1960, making it one of the few American network affiliates outside of the United States and its territories. The affiliation was, however, primary, as it also aired content from NBC and ABC in its early years. International programming was shipped weekly; major international news stories within a 24-hour window. ZBM and ZFB, after determining their affiliations, also had agreements with NBC and the BBC. ZBM introduced The Junior Club, aimed at children, with live segments interspersed with cartoons. By the time ZFB was already airing cartoons on Saturday mornings, its cartoons supplied by CBS aired on Saturday afternoons and weekdays. The station transitioned to colour in 1971, the second colour television service on the island of Bermuda after ZFB, which introduced theirs in November 1970. In 1983, Capital Broadcasting Company merged with Bermuda Broadcasting Company, with Bermuda Broadcasting being responsible for the two stations. A strike at the company took the two stations off the air for a few months in 1984, before being the only of the two channels resuming operations, with CBS programming and a five-minute newscast, Eye on Bermuda, which was later reverted to the half-hour format as Newscenter 10.

In 1987, the Bermuda government reallocated the VHF channels available (8, 10, 12) to channels 7, 9, 11 and 13. ZBM-TV was moved to channel 9 in 1988.

== Technical information ==
=== Subchannel ===
Subchannel of ZBM-TV
Channel	Res.	Short name	Programming
20.9	720p	CBS	CBS

=== Analog-to-digital conversion ===
On the week of 9 March 2016, Bermuda Broadcasting ended analogue broadcasts and converted ZFB-TV and ZBM-TV to digital using ATSC, with both services sharing a multiplex on channel 20. The transmitter was knocked out of service some time later when lightning struck the transmitter. In 2017, in time for the America's Cup, Bermuda Broadcasting completed an upgrade that added a second transmitter for ZFB, using virtual channel 19.7, allowing both ZFB and ZBM to broadcast in HD; it also replaced its radio transmitters. With the upgrade, ZBM began using virtual channel 20.9.
