= ZNBC TV1 =

- Country: Zambia
- Broadcast area: Zambia
- Headquarters: Lusaka

Programming
- Language: English
- Picture format: 16:9 576i SDTV

Ownership
- Owner: ZBC
- Sister channels: ZNBC TV2

History
- Launched: 1961
- Former names: ZNBC TV

Links
- Website: znbc.co.zm

ZNBC TV1 is the main television channel of the Zambia National Broadcasting Corporation. It was set up in 1961 when it was Northern Rhodesia, though the first television transmitter was built in Kitwe in the Copperbelt area, though it later moved to Lusaka.

== History ==
Television was introduced to Zambia during colonial times in 1961 as Rhodesia Television's third television station, after the stations in Bulawayo and Salisbury that were introduced before. It was set up in Kitwe by RTV's aide Lonrho (London Rhodesia), though, upon independence, it moved to Lusaka, where a transmitter had been set up in 1965. At the time, ZBC, later ZNBC, broadcast on three transmitters, while Kitwe had an additional educational service during the mornings. Colour television broadcasts started in 1977. TV transmission times increased in 1970, followed by colour television in 1977, and nationwide coverage in 1982.

ZNBC briefly expanded its broadcast hours when it added a relay of M-Net's Channel O to air during the daytime, however it was removed in August 1998 following a survey which showed that older generations didn't like it and had the right to decide what children watched. With its removal, ZNBC reverted to its usual 5pm opening time. That same year, ZNBC TV lost its monopoly.

By 2012, following the launch of ZNBC TV2, it was renamed ZNBC TV1.
