= AJL-TV =

First TV station in Saudi Arabia

AJL-TV (channel 8), "the Eye of the Desert", was the first television station in both Saudi Arabia and the Arabian Peninsula. The station was set up by the Armed Forces Radio and Television Service of the United States and started broadcasting on 17 June 1955 (16 June according to some sources) using a 200-watt transmitter. Broadcasts were limited to personnel stationed at the USAF Dhahran Airfield. Like other AFRTS stations, its programming was contemporary American television fare, but all references to Christianity, Israel or alcohol were edited out due to religious considerations. The signal was received in most Aramco communities and by overspill in Bahrain.

In 1958, the station carried weekly programs on fire prevention, led by Chief John Miller.

The station was shut down in 1961, but was revived when the base was staffed during the 1990-1991 Gulf War, resuming radio and television broadcasts in the process. On 17 January 1992, the television station was vacated and shut down for good.
