= RÚV (TV channel) =

- Type: Public broadcasting
- Country: Iceland
- Broadcast area: Iceland

Programming
- Language: Icelandic
- Picture format: 1080i HDTV

Ownership
- Owner: RÚV
- Sister channels: RÚV 2

History
- Launched: 30 September 1966; 60 years ago
- Former names: Sjónvarpið (1966–2011); RÚV1 (2011–2016)

Links
- Webcast: www.ruv.is/sjonvarp/beint/ruv
- Website: www.ruv.is

RÚV is the main television channel of RÚV, the Icelandic public broadcaster, launched in 1966. The free-to-air channel broadcasts primarily news, sports, entertainment, cultural programs, children's material, original Icelandic programming as well as American, British and Nordic content. Among its highest-rated programs are the comedy sketch show Spaugstofan, mystery drama Ófærð (Trapped) and Fréttir (News).

It is the Icelandic Olympic Broadcaster and has also usually holds rights to the FIFA World Cup and UEFA Euro competitions. It is a member of the European Broadcasting Union and is responsible for selecting Iceland's entries to the Eurovision Song Contest.

== History ==
RÚV's current logo since 1965. It is RÚV's current and original iconic logo which is designed by Gísli B. Björnsson, and it is also used by RÚV Sjónvarpið (now known as RÚV1), although this logo were incorporated into the 2011 redesign.

Previous channel logo (2011–2019)

In 1955, Armed Forces Radio and Television Service Keflavik started broadcasting an English language television service from the American Naval Air Station Keflavik, which until 1977 was an over-the-air television station. Since there was much skepticism over the influence of the Keflavik station, and that it had sufficient coverage in Reykjavik, the Icelandic government began studying the possibility of a state-funded television service in 1963, eight years after the first American broadcasts.

With the filing of the Television Committee Report in March 1964, it was concluded that no buildings in Reykjavik were appropriate to have a television studio, with the cost of modifying a building being 75 percent of the cost of construction. As there were no film or television studios in Iceland, all equipment had to be imported. The committee worked with the Icelandic Posts, Telegraphs and Telecommunications Corporation to build a 5,000-watt television transmitter at Skálafell mountain, with low-powered relay stations being built for cost-related reasons. In the period between 1964 and 1972, the total cost of the service was to be 224 million krónur, with three sources of financing: television licences, advertising and a levy on the import or assembly of television sets. With 2,500 sets available in Iceland in 1963, it was demanded that these sets should be licensed, with RÚV gaining 3.5 million krónur, 4.5 million if there were 3,000 sets in 1964. RÚV seized the opportunity to use commercial financing, which in some capitalist countries was seen as an "unnecessary evil". Low population (less than 250,000 at the time) and the success of advertising on state radio made it easy for state television to be sustained by commercials.

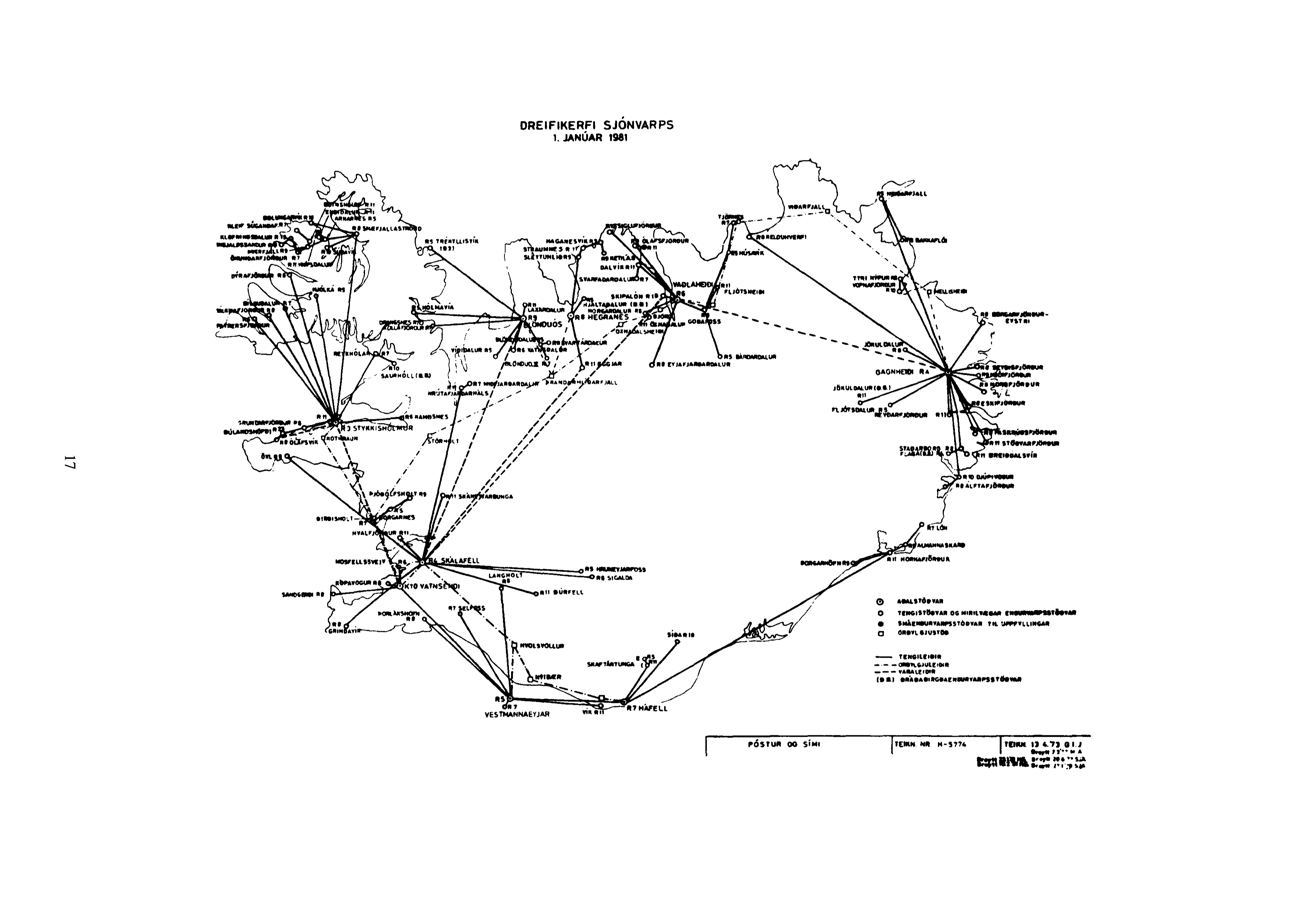
Icelandic television transmission network in 1981,

The committee suggested that the television service shouldn't start before 8 pm, under the principle that the average family would be, at the average time of coming home (6 pm), listening to the main magazine program on radio; the television broadcast would, from 8 pm, extend for a period of two or three hours. No less than 40 percent of total content was to be produced in Iceland.

The network made its first transmission on 30 September 1966 at 20:00 WET. To begin with, transmissions only took place on Wednesdays and Fridays, only gradually expanding to the rest of the week through the years (six days by September 1967), but there were no transmissions on Thursdays. In addition, no television was broadcast in July. Transmissions in July began in 1983. Sjónvarpið was the first public television channel in Iceland and also the first to broadcast in the Icelandic language. Having lost its monopoly and sharing the market with Stöð 2 a year before, Sjónvarpið ended the era of television-free Thursdays on 1 October 1987, resulting in the first full week of television in Iceland.

The reason for the limited programming was due to the popular belief that Icelandic viewers wouldn't watch television during traditional dinner time, and that the Thursday break was justified due to the social norms at the time; had there been any television broadcasts on Thursdays at the time, it would have meant insufficient financing and staffing that wouldn't justify such broadcasts. For the July break, there were several possible explanations: the idea that it would give viewers a break from television, while for engineers it provided them with a period of maintenance of its equipment. At the time, if someone at RÚV took a vacation period, no one would be left to fill the job. In order to save money on operational costs, reruns weren't part of the schedule. After pressure from the public, television broadcasts in July started in 1983, but not on Thursdays.

While the first station was headquartered in Reykjavík, repeaters were installed over the next years in Vestmannaeyjar (channel 5, on 30 September 1966), Stykkishólmur (channel 3, on 17 May 1967), Skálafell (channel 4, on 22 December 1967), Hoffell (channel 7, on 23 December 1967), Vaðlaheiði (channel 6, on 1 December 1968) and Hegranes (channel 8, on 13 December 1968).

Test colour transmission commenced in 1973 and started full-time in 1976. From 24 October 1975, imported programming in colour started, but by the early 80s, much of the hardware came from the black and white phase. The first colour news bulletin was broadcast on 30 September 1977, the day of the eleventh anniversary of the channel. From September 1981 onwards, the channel greatly benefited from Iceland's connection to the rest of the world via satellite, after producing the first filmed news item for export on 11 August it joined the Intelsat network on 20 September for coverage of an Icelandic shipwreck using its satellite earth station. Starting on March 1, 1982, Icelandic television viewers were able to watch daily reports from abroad on their evening newscast. Live broadcasts from the rest of Europe, such as the Eurovision Song Contest, commenced for the first time in May 1986. By the early 1980s, foreign programming was mostly sourced from the United States and the United Kingdom, as well as limited programming from a handful of other sources, mostly European countries such as France, Sweden, the Soviet Union and Czechoslovakia.

As of 1983, the evening began at 7:45 pm with Táknmalsfréttir, the sign language bulletin, followed by the main news (Fréttir) at 8 pm. An advertising segment started at 8:25 pm, lasting ten minutes. This was followed by an animated segment at 8:35 pm. At 8:45 pm, the schedule would change to either sports, cultural or comedy programming, followed by the second (of two) commercial breaks. At 9:10 pm the main programs started, with closedown being before 11pm. On Saturdays, programming was often from 4:30 pm to shortly after midnight.

=== 1990s ===
RÚV's teletext service, Textavarpið, was inaugurated on the 25th anniversary of Icelandic television in 1991.

As late as 2000, television only aired for 8 hours each day, starting at around 4:35 pm and ending at around 12:35 am on weekdays. The number of hours of television aired per week changes every week and day, with transmissions during the weekend being the longest. RÚV currently starts at 7 am on Saturdays and Sundays. During the week, however, transmissions still start between 3 pm and 5:30 pm and end between midnight and 1:30 am. During downtime, the station carries its daily schedule and a news ticker, complete with audio from Rás 2.

Since its establishment in 1966, RÚV broadcast using the analogue 625-line PAL standard over the very high frequency band until the analogue switchoff in 2015.

=== 2000s ===
Broadcasts were also available over Vodafone Iceland's Multichannel Multipoint Distribution Service and Síminn Breiðband cable TV services, which have both been since discontinued.

In 2004, RÚV became available over broadband and fibre Internet Protocol television systems of Síminn and Vodafone Iceland.

In May 2007, RÚV began direct satellite TV broadcasts supplemented by Rás 1 and Rás 2 over DTV radio, in order to service fishing fleets around Iceland and remote areas where the terrestrial network does not reach. Telenor ASA ran the service on Intelsat 10-02, later on the Thor 5 satellite over DVB-S, by contract until it ceased in mid-2025. The service was encrypted and was only available on request.

Preparations for high-definition television (HDTV) broadcasts began in 2012, when two new 1080i play-out systems were installed. Digital HDTV broadcasts commenced in 2014 following an agreement signed with Vodafone Iceland on 27 March 2013 to install and run two new shared digital multiplexes using DVB-T2 (for HD transmissions) and DVB-T (for SD transmissions) over ultra high frequency bands. Analogue transmissions were shut down on 2 February 2015. Transmissions on the older DVB-T system in standard definition ceased on 3 June 2024, however DVB-T2 broadcasts in HD only remain.

In 2021, television transmissions for the Reykjavík area were moved from Vatnsendi to Úlfarsfell, ending 70 years of broadcasting from the location.

In 2026, it was reported that RÚV intends to end terrestrial broadcasting via DVB completely in April 2028.

=== Test cards ===
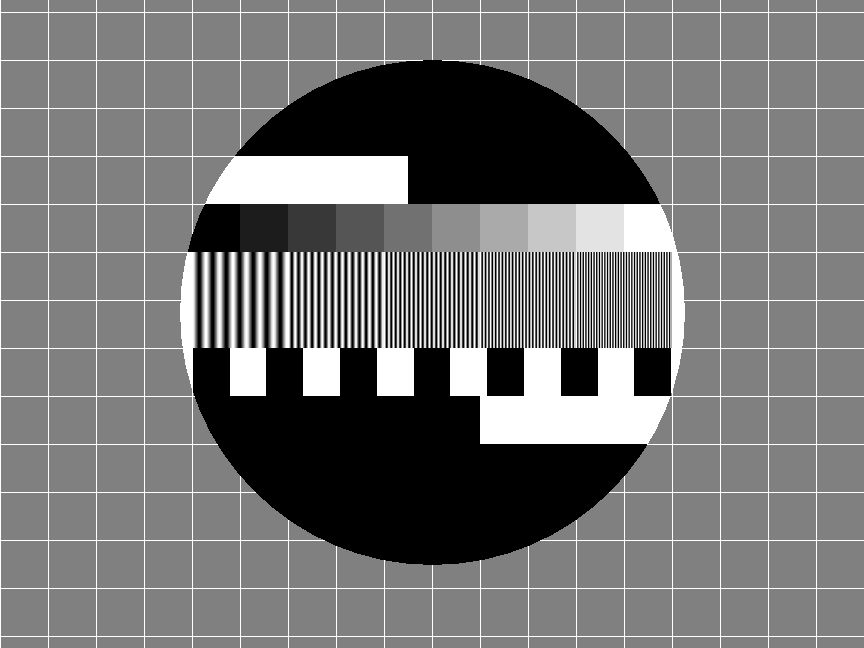
Early Sjónvarpið test card. This test card was also used by Süddeutscher Rundfunk (SDR), Südwestfunk (SWF) and Sender Freies Berlin (SFB) in West Germany.

From the inauguration of Sjónvarpið in 1966 until as late as 1982, an electronically generated, heavily modified version of the Philips PM5540 monochrome test card was utilised during off-air hours, with the words Ríkisútvarpið SJÓNVARP occasionally appearing in the top and bottom black segments respectively.

In the early-1970s, the Philips PM5544 test card was introduced for colour transmissions and gradually replaced the previous monochrome test card.

==== Timeline of changes ====
Text has been changed three times, minor change five times, returned two times

- 1970–1994 – "RUV – ISLAND"
  - 1993 – "RÚV – ÍSLAND"
- 1995 – Added time and date
- 2000 – Remove time and date
  - Remove "ÍSLAND" and replace with the moving bar
- 2002 – Return the 1995 version
- 2006 – Return the 2000 version
- 2009 – Changed to Philips PM5644
- 2011 – the test card was discontinued when an overnight filler programme similar to ITV Nightscreen was introduced during RÚV's off-air hours.

RÚV's testcard uses test tone but the last 15 minutes before programs start plays classical music.

==== Closing and opening times ====
- 1966–2018 opens at 16:30 for weekdays and closes at 00:00.
- 1966–2004 Weekends and holidays open at 9:00, though sometimes with midday break.
- 2004–2018 Weekends and holidays open at 8:00.
- 2018-present Opens at 13:00 for weekdays and closes at 01:00.
- 2018-present Weekends and holidays open from 07:15
- Nightscreen during other times

== Distribution ==
Terrestrial broadcasts are in 1080i HD on a UHF DVB-T2 network operated by Sýn by contract until 2028. The broadcasts are free-to-air and reach 99.9% of the population.

Due to the prevalence of fiber internet connections in Iceland, the most popular way to view broadcasts is through the internet. RÚV is available through managed IPTV systems on Síminn and Vodafone. RÚV also offers all of its content, through OTT services as well as on their website. RÚV also offers an app for Apple TV, iOS, Android TV and Android. Webcasts are open and free when accessed from Iceland, however some programming is not available internationally due to licensing issues. It is possible to login using an Icelandic digital ID to have full access to broadcasts internationally.

Share of distribution methods (2022)
Distribution method	Market share
Terrestrial broadcasts (DVB)	1%
IPTV set-top box (Síminn/Vodafone)	64%
OTT services (e.g. Apple TV app)	27%
Website	7%
Other	1%

As of 2024, RÚV's teletext channel, Textavarpið, is still operating over DVB-T2, managed IPTV and on the web at textavarp.is.

== Programming ==
RÚV broadcasts various original and foreign programming. Around 30% of Icelanders watch RÚV's nightly news, Fréttir. RÚV is the Icelandic Olympic Broadcaster and has also usually holds rights to the FIFA World Cup and UEFA Euro competitions. It is a member of the European Broadcasting Union and is responsible for selecting Iceland's entries to the Eurovision Song Contest.

Recent original programming that RÚV has produced is listed as follows (recurring and one-off):

=== Recurring ===
- Fréttir, the main news programme at 7 pm.
- Kastljós, a news/talk programme (similar to Newsnight)
- Kveikur, an explanatory news programme (similar to BBC's Panorama)
- Gettu betur, a long-running quiz show, contested between teams representing Icelandic schools and colleges
- Vikan með Gísla Marteini, an entertainment/talk show
- Landinn, a programme about rural locations in Iceland
- Áramótaskaupið, a New Year's Eve comedy special, known for having historically been one of Iceland's most-watched television programmes.
- Jóladagatal Sjónvarpsins, an ongoing series of televised Advent calendars.
- Stundin Okkar, children's programme since 1966
- Söngvakeppnin, annual music competition used to select Iceland's representative to the Eurovision Song Contest

=== Other original programming ===
- Verbúðin (Blackport), a series set in the 1980s in the Westfjords.
- Brot (The Valhalla Murders)
- Ófærð (Trapped), a mystery drama series set in Seyðisfjörður.
- Ráðherran (The Minister)
- Latibær (LazyTown)
- Spaugstofan
- Sigla himinfley, a 4-part drama mini-series

They have also aired other shows which were dubbed in the Icelandic language, such as Woody Woodpecker, Butterfly Island, Bluey, The Flintstones, Bertha, Fraggle Rock, Wowser, Thomas and Friends, Bob the Builder, Angelina Ballerina, and many more.

== See also ==
- Television in Iceland
