= Lists of newspapers =

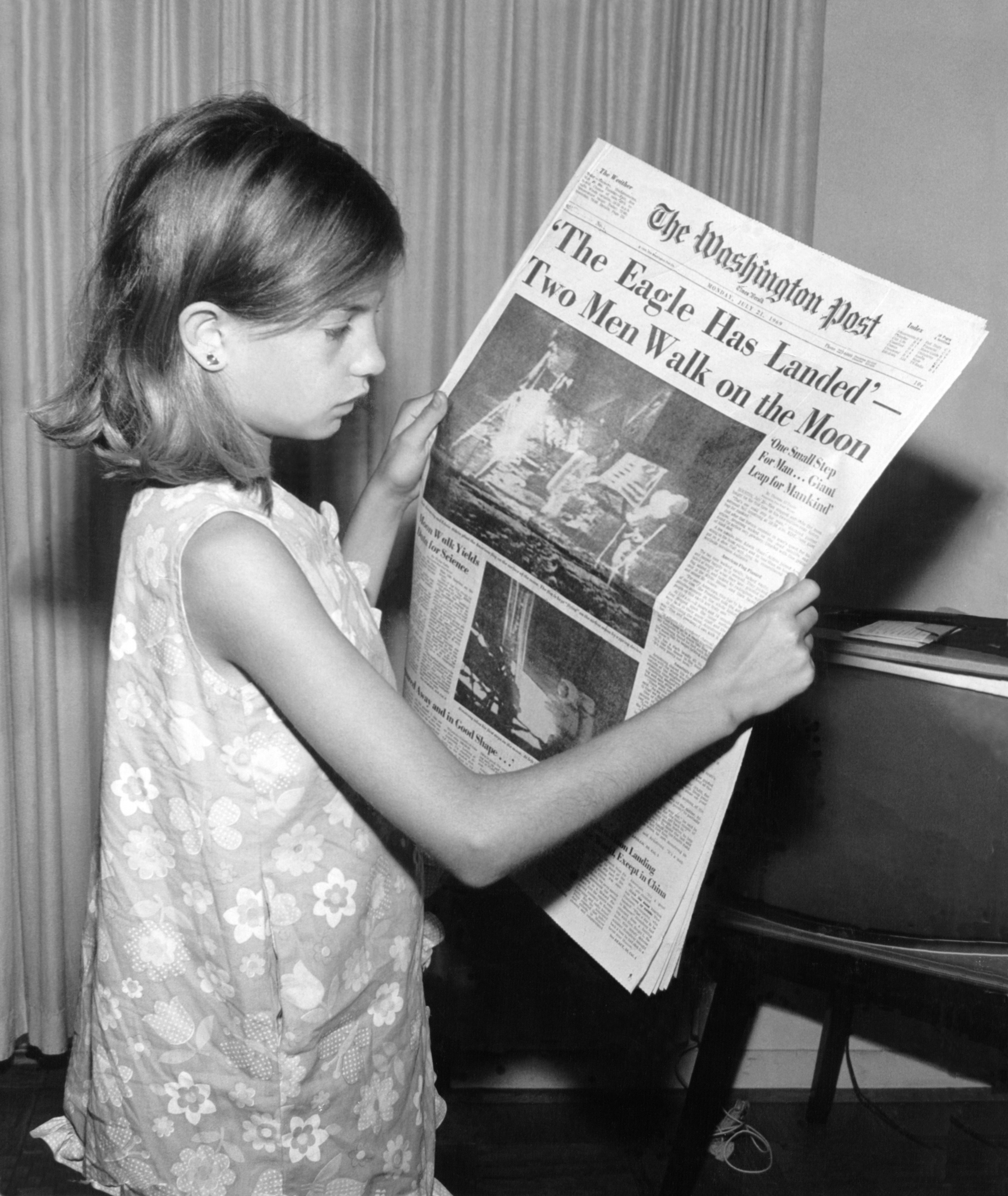
A girl holds a copy of The Washington Post reporting the Apollo 11 Moon landing on July 21, 1969

Below are lists of newspapers organized by continent.

== By country ==
=== A ===
- List of newspapers in Afghanistan
- List of newspapers in Åland
- List of newspapers in Albania
- List of newspapers in Algeria
- List of newspapers in Andorra
- List of newspapers in Angola
- List of newspapers in Anguilla
- List of newspapers in Antigua and Barbuda
- List of newspapers in Argentina
- List of newspapers in Armenia
- List of newspapers in Aruba
- List of newspapers in Austria
- List of newspapers in Azerbaijan

=== B ===
- List of newspapers in the Bahamas
- List of newspapers in Bahrain
- List of newspapers in Bangladesh
- List of newspapers in Barbados
- List of newspapers in Belarus
- List of newspapers in Belgium
- List of defunct newspapers of Belgium
- List of newspapers in Belize
- List of newspapers in Benin
- List of newspapers in Bermuda
- List of newspapers in Bhutan
- List of newspapers in Bolivia
- List of newspapers in Bosnia and Herzegovina
- List of newspapers in Botswana
- List of newspapers in Brazil
- List of newspapers in the British Virgin Islands
- List of newspapers in Brunei
- List of newspapers in Bulgaria

=== C ===
- List of newspapers in Cambodia
- List of newspapers in Cameroon
- List of newspapers in the Cayman Islands
- List of newspapers in the Central African Republic
- List of newspapers in Chad
- List of newspapers in Chile
- List of newspapers in Colombia
- List of newspapers in the Democratic Republic of the Congo
- List of newspapers in Costa Rica
- List of newspapers in Croatia
- List of newspapers in Cuba
- List of newspapers in Curaçao
- List of newspapers in Cyprus
- List of newspapers in the Czech Republic

=== D ===
- List of newspapers in Denmark
- List of newspapers in Dominica
- List of newspapers in the Dominican Republic

=== E ===
- List of newspapers in Ecuador
- List of newspapers in Egypt
- List of newspapers in El Salvador
- List of newspapers in Estonia
- List of newspapers in Eswatini
- List of newspapers in Ethiopia

=== F ===
- List of newspapers in the Faroe Islands
- List of newspapers in Fiji
- List of newspapers in Finland
- List of newspapers in France
- List of defunct newspapers of France
- List of newspapers in French Guiana

=== G ===
- List of newspapers in the Gambia
- List of newspapers in Georgia (country)
- List of newspapers in Germany
- List of defunct newspapers of Germany
- List of newspapers in Ghana
- List of newspapers in Gibraltar
- List of newspapers in Greece
- List of newspapers in Greenland
- List of newspapers in Grenada
- List of newspapers in Guatemala
- List of newspapers in Guernsey
- List of newspapers in Guinea
- List of newspapers in Guyana

=== H ===
- List of newspapers in Haiti
- List of newspapers in Honduras
- List of newspapers in Hong Kong
- List of newspapers in Hungary
- List of defunct newspapers of Hungary

=== I ===
- List of newspapers in Iceland
- List of newspapers in India
- List of newspapers in Indonesia
- List of newspapers in Iran
- List of newspapers in Iraq
- List of newspapers in the Republic of Ireland
- List of newspapers in Israel
- List of newspapers in Italy
- List of newspapers in Ivory Coast

=== J ===
- List of newspapers in Jamaica
- List of newspapers in Japan
- List of newspapers in Jersey
- List of newspapers in Jordan

=== K ===
- List of newspapers in Kazakhstan
- List of newspapers in Kenya
- List of newspapers in Kiribati
- List of newspapers in Korea
- List of newspapers in Kuwait
- List of newspapers in Kyrgyzstan

=== L ===
- List of newspapers in Laos
- List of newspapers in Latvia
- List of newspapers in Lebanon
- List of newspapers in Libya
- List of newspapers in Liechtenstein
- List of newspapers in Lithuania
- List of newspapers in Luxembourg

=== M ===
- List of newspapers in North Macedonia
- List of newspapers in Madagascar
- List of newspapers in Malawi
- List of newspapers in Malaysia
- List of newspapers in the Maldives
- List of newspapers in Malta
- List of newspapers in the Isle of Man
- List of newspapers in Mauritius
- List of newspapers in Mexico
- List of newspapers in Moldova
- List of newspapers in Monaco
- List of newspapers in Mongolia
- List of newspapers in Montenegro
- List of newspapers in Montserrat
- List of newspapers in Morocco
- List of newspapers in Mozambique
- List of newspapers in Myanmar

=== N ===
- List of newspapers in Namibia
- List of newspapers in Nauru
- List of newspapers in Nepal
- List of newspapers in the Netherlands
- List of print media in New Zealand
- List of newspapers in Nicaragua
- List of newspapers in Niue
- List of newspapers in North Korea
- List of newspapers in Northern Cyprus
- List of newspapers in Norway
- List of defunct newspapers of Norway

=== O ===
- List of newspapers in Oman

=== P ===
- List of newspapers in Pakistan
- List of newspapers in Palestine
- List of newspapers in Panama
- List of newspapers in Papua New Guinea
- List of newspapers in Paraguay
- List of newspapers in Peru
- List of newspapers in the Philippines
- List of newspapers in Poland
- List of newspapers in Portugal

=== Q ===
- List of newspapers in Qatar

=== R ===
- List of newspapers in Romania
- List of newspapers in Russia

=== S ===
- List of newspapers in Saint Kitts and Nevis
- List of newspapers in Saint Lucia
- List of newspapers in Saint Vincent and the Grenadines
- List of newspapers in Samoa
- List of newspapers in San Marino
- List of newspapers in Saudi Arabia
- List of newspapers in Scotland
- List of newspapers in Senegal
- List of newspapers in Serbia
- List of newspapers in Sierra Leone
- List of newspapers in Singapore
- List of newspapers in Slovakia
- List of newspapers in Slovenia
- List of newspapers in Solomon Islands
- List of newspapers in South Africa
- List of newspapers in South Korea
- List of newspapers in Spain
- List of newspapers in Sri Lanka
- List of newspapers in Sudan
- List of newspapers in Suriname
- List of newspapers in Svalbard
- List of Swedish-language newspapers
- List of newspapers in Switzerland
- List of newspapers in Syria

=== T ===
- List of newspapers in Taiwan
- List of newspapers in Tajikistan
- List of newspapers in Tanzania
- List of newspapers in Timor-Leste
- List of newspapers in Tokelau
- List of newspapers in Tonga
- List of newspapers in Trinidad and Tobago
- List of newspapers in Tunisia
- List of newspapers in Turkey
- List of newspapers in Turkmenistan
- List of newspapers in the Turks and Caicos Islands
- List of newspapers in Tuvalu

=== U ===
- List of newspapers in Uganda
- List of newspapers in Ukraine
- List of newspapers in the United Arab Emirates
- List of newspapers in the United Kingdom
- List of newspapers in the United States
- List of newspapers in Uruguay
- List of newspapers in Uzbekistan

=== V ===
- List of newspapers in Vanuatu
- List of newspapers in Vatican City
- List of newspapers in Venezuela
- List of newspapers in Vietnam

=== Y ===
- List of newspapers in Yemen

=== Z ===
- List of newspapers in Zambia

== Miscellaneous ==
=== German-language ===
==== Extant ====
- List of newspapers in Germany
- List of newspapers in Switzerland § German language
- List of newspapers in Austria
- List of newspapers in Luxembourg
- List of newspapers in Liechtenstein
- The only German-language daily newspaper in Belgium is Grenz-Echo
- German-language newspapers in Africa include Allgemeine Zeitung (Namibia) and Deutsch-Ostafrikanische Zeitung (Dar-es Salaam, defunct)

==== Defunct ====
- List of German-language newspapers published in the United States
- List of German-language newspapers of Ontario
  - Der Bote (Winnipeg) and Das Echo (Montreal) were published elsewhere in Canada
- German-language newspapers in China included Deutsche Shanghai Zeitung, Shanghai Jewish Chronicle, Tsingtauer Neueste Nachrichten, and Der Ostasiatische Lloyd
- Der Landmann was published in Siberia

=== Korea ===
- List of newspapers in Korea (pre-1945)
- List of newspapers in North Korea
- List of newspapers in South Korea

== See also ==
- Newspaper of record
