= List of newspapers in Vanuatu =

This is a list of newspapers in Vanuatu.

- L'Hebdo du Vanuatu (weekly, in French; same publisher as the Vanuatu Daily Post)
- Nasara (weekly)
- Ni-Vanuatu (weekly)
- Pentecost Star
- Port Vila Presse (weekly)
- Vanuatu Daily Post (published from Monday to Saturday, most widely read newspaper, readership 2,000 to 3,000)
- The Vanuatu Independent (weekly)
- Vanuatu Times (weekly)
- Vanuatu Weekly (state-owned; in Bislama, English, and French)

== See also ==
- Mass media in Vanuatu
- Lists of newspapers
