= Mass media in Vanuatu =

The Republic of Vanuatu is an officially trilingual state in the western Pacific, the three national languages being English, French and Bislama. There is a diversity of newspapers, but only one state-owned television channel. Private radio stations are a recent development; there were reportedly none in 2007.

== Freedom of the media ==
Freedom House in 2007 categorised Vanuatu's media as "free", noting however that "journalists have been censored or intimidated" by members of the police in isolated incidents, leading to apologies by the Police Commissioner.

In 2001, Marc Neil-Jones, British-born publisher of the Vanuatu Daily Post, "was unlawfully deported from Vanuatu before being able to publish an article critical of the government". His deportation was subsequently overturned. In June 2011, Harry Iauko was convicted of aiding and abetting damage to property and aiding and abetting intentional assault, for having led a group of men into the offices of the Daily Post, where they assaulted Neil-Jones for the newspaper's criticism of Iauko, who was at the time Minister for Infrastructure and Public Utilities. Iauko was fined Vt 15,000. Reporters Without Borders denounced the fine as "risible", saying it was "not commensurate with the gravity of the crime", and that such a small fine for an assault on a journalist risked pushing other journalists to censor themselves rather than criticise politicians.

The Commonwealth of Nations reported in 2013 that "Vanuatu is widely considered by independent observers as a country with an unfettered freedom of press".

== Press ==
The Vanuatu Weekly is a state-owned paper published in all three national languages. The two main daily newspapers are both private: the Port Vila Presse (in French and in English), and the Vanuatu Daily Post (in English). The Daily Post has a sister weekly newspaper in French, L'Hebdo du Vanuatu. The Vanuatu Independent, Nasara, and the Ni-Vanuatu are all private weekly papers.

== Radio ==
The state-owned Radio Vanuatu is operated by the Vanuatu Broadcasting and Television Corporation. Its origins lie in the colonial era, prior to the country's independence from France and the United Kingdom in 1980. During the colonial period it began as Radio Vila, then Radio New Hebrides, initially broadcasting only ten minutes a day. As of 2013, it broadcasts "16 hours of news, information programs, music and entertainment". The station "has achieved almost nationwide coverage", and, as of 2000, used Bislama "approximately 80 percent of the time".

Private radio stations are Capital FM 107, 96Buzz FM, and the Christian station Laef FM.

Also available are foreign radio broadcasts tailored for an international audience: BBC World Service, Radio France Internationale, Radio Australia, and China Radio International.

== Television ==
Television Blong Vanuatu (Bislama for "Television of Vanuatu") is operated by the state's Vanuatu Broadcasting and Television Corporation (Government owned). "Established with the help of Radio France Overseas", it broadcasts both in French and in English. As of 2010, it reached only about 20% of the population, and 80% of its content was borrowed from the New Caledonian channel Nouvelle-Calédonie 1re. France provided assistance to extend its coverage to a greater part of the country.

KAM TV (Komuniti Akses Media) is the second TV channel locally produced in Vanuatu by Marke Lowen. It broadcasts 24/7 and the programming consists of approximately 95% local content. KAM is operated as a free Open public channel promoting local cultural knowledge and education under a 'not for profit' structure. It is broadcast FTA as Channel 1 on Telsat Pacific's UHF DVB-T2 digital TV system. (www.telsat.vu)

== See also ==
- Telecommunications in Vanuatu
