= List of newspapers in Saint Kitts and Nevis =

This is a list of newspapers currently published in Saint Kitts and Nevis.

== Weekly ==
- The St. Kitts-Nevis Observer – Basseterre
- The Labour Spokesman – Basseterre

== Official ==
- St. Kitts and Nevis Information Service (SKNIS) – government press releases

== News websites ==
- Nevis Pages – Charlestown
- My Vue News – Basseterre
- SKN Newsline – online TV news, Basseterre
- SKN Pulse – Basseterre
- SKN Vibes – Basseterre
- SKN List – Basseterre
- St. Kitts Gazette – Basseterre

== Defunct newspapers ==
- Opron Star

== See also ==
- List of newspapers
