= List of defunct newspapers of Belgium =

This is a list of defunct newspapers of Belgium.

- Le Communiste
- Écho de la Sambre
- Gazette van Ghendt
- Ghendtsche Post-Tydinghen
- Het Volk
- L'Indépendance Belge
- La Libre Belgique (1940–44)
- Nieuwe Tijdinghen
- Le Pays Réel
- Le Vingtième Siècle
- La Voix des Belges
- Volk en Staat
- Het Vrije Woord
