= List of newspapers in Niue =

This is a list of newspapers in Niue. There is only one Niuean newspaper currently in circulation: the privately owned Niue Star. Tohi Tala Niue, a government publication, is no longer in circulation.

- Niue Star (weekly)
- Tohi Tala Niue (defunct)

== See also ==
- Lists of newspapers
