= List of newspapers in Mongolia =

This is a list of newspapers in Mongolia.

- Aphrodite (Афродита) (Ulaanbaatar)
- Great Nation (Их үндэстэн) (Ulaanbaatar)
- Alag Khorvoo (Алаг хорвоо) (Ulaanbaatar)
- Bökh (Бөх) (Ulaanbaatar)
- The Mongol Messenger (in English) (Ulaanbaatar)
- Mongolia This Week (in English)
- Mongoliin Ünen (Монголын үнэн) (of the Mongolian People's Party) - Mongolian Truth
- Niigmiin Toli (Нийгмийн толь) (Ulaanbaatar/national) - Society's Brief
- UB Post (in English) (Ulaanbaatar)
- Udriin Sonin (Өдрийн сонин) (Ulaanbaatar/national) - Daily News
- Ulaan Od (Улаан Од) (of the Mongolian Armed Forces)
- Unuudur (Өнөөдөр) (Ulaanbaatar/national) - Today
- Zuunii Medee (Зууны мэдээ) (Ulaanbaatar/national) - Century's News

Below is a list of magazines published in Mongolia.

- Computer Times (Компьютер Таймс) (Ulaanbaatar/national)
- Goo Mongol (Гоо монгол) (Ulaanbaatar/national) - Beautiful/nice Mongol
- Gyalbaa (Гялбаа) (Ulaanbaatar/national) - Bright
- Polar Star (Алтангадас) (Ulaanbaatar/national)
- Uptown (Аптаун) (Ulaanbaatar/national)
- Step by Step (Ulaanbaatar/national) (in English)

== See also ==
- Montsame, official state-owned news agency of Mongolia
- Media of Mongolia
- List of newspapers
