= List of newspapers in Belgium =

Since the 1950s the newspaper market has been in decline in Belgium. The number of national daily newspapers in the country was 50 in 1950, whereas it was 30 in 1965. The number became 33 in 1980. There were 32 newspapers in the country in 1995. It was 23 in 2000.

Below is a partial list of newspapers published in Belgium:

== Daily newspapers ==
Newspaper	Language	Owner	Website	Av. dist. (2011)
Het Belang van Limburg	Dutch	Concentra	hbvl.be	100,113
Gazet van Antwerpen	Dutch	Concentra	gva.be	101,559
Het Laatste Nieuws	Dutch	De Persgroep	hln.be	288,898
Metro	Dutch	Mass Transit Media	metrotime.be	130,968
De Morgen	Dutch	De Persgroep	demorgen.be	55,870
Het Nieuwsblad (incl. De Gentenaar)	Dutch	Corelio	nieuwsblad.be/	264,961
De Standaard	Dutch	Corelio	standaard.be	95,746
De Tijd	Dutch	Mediafin	tijd.be	37,720
The Brussels Times	English	The Brussels Times	brusselstimes.com	NA
Brussels Morning Newspaper	English	Brussels Morning Newspaper	brusselsmorning.com	NA
L'Avenir	French	Tecteo	lavenir.net	94,118
La Libre Belgique	French	Groupe IPM	lalibre.be	42,410
La Dernière Heure	French	Groupe IPM	dhnet.be	62,427
L'Echo	French	Mediafin	lecho.be	17,170
Metro	French	Mass Transit Media	metrotime.be	116,022
Le Soir	French	Rossel et Cie	lesoir.be	82,044
SudPresse newspapers*	French	Rossel et Cie	sudpresse.be	115,853
Grenz-Echo	German	Grenz-Echo Verlag	grenzecho.be	12,079

* — La Capitale, La Meuse, La Nouvelle Gazette, La Province and Nord Eclair

== Other newspapers ==
=== Dutch language ===
- Brugsch Handelsblad
- Kortrijks Handelsblad

=== English language newspapers ===
- The Brussels Times Belgium’s leading daily online English-language news media and bi-monthly print magazine.
- Politico Europe better known for its mailing list and website but it also has a weekly paper edition. Politico Europe is based in Belgium, but its subject matter is EU politics and policymaking.
- The Bulletin

== Media groups in Belgium ==
- Mediahuis
- De Persgroep
- Rossel
- Roularta

== Bibliography ==
- British Museum (1885), "Brussels", Periodical Publications, Catalogue of Printed Books, London
- "Belgium: Directory: the Press". Europa World Year Book. Europa Publications. 2004. ISBN 978-1-85743-254-1.
- Arthur der Weduwen (2017). Dutch and Flemish Newspapers of the Seventeenth Century. Brill. ISBN 9789004317314.
