= List of newspapers in Solomon Islands =

This is a list of newspapers in Solomon Islands.

Print

- The Island Sun (Honiara)
- National Express
- Solomon Star (Honiara; most widely read)
- Solomon Women Newspaper (published since 2015; same publisher as the Sunday Isles)
- Sunday Isles (Honiara)

Online

- Solomon Times Online (Honiara)
- Solomonstoday.com (Honiara)
- Solomon Islands Herald (Honiara)
- Solomon Islands Broadcasting Corporation (Honiara)

== See also ==
- List of newspapers
