= List of newspapers in Brunei =

This is a list of newspapers in Brunei.

- Berita Brunei - first published in March 1957; October 1959 it was renamed as Berita Borneo
- Bintang Harian - published in both Malay and English; first appeared in March 1966
- Borneo Bulletin - first appeared on November 7, 1953; the only newspaper in Brunei to publish seven days a week
- BruDirect - also known as Brunei Direct; an online newspaper and the largest online media information tool; a pioneer in the field of online media in Brunei Darussalam; the website has an audience of 70,000 to 80,000 visits per day
- The Brunei Times - introduced in 2006, defunct since 2016
- The Daily Star - published in both Malay and English; first appeared in March 1966
- Government's Pelita Brunei - first published in 1956
- Media Permata - Brunei's only daily newspaper in Malay language
- Pelita Brunei
- Salam Seria - first published in 1952 by the British Malayan Petroleum Company
- The Scoop - English language news website
- Suara Bakti - publication by a former political party; published in October 1961
- The Brunei Post - introduced in 2021, an independent online publication start-up.

== See also ==
- List of newspapers
