= Fernando Pagés Ruiz =

Argentinian-American author, businessman, and construction consultant

Fernando Pages Ruiz
- Born: April 29, 1956 (age 70); Buenos Aires, Argentina
- Citizenship: American, Argentinian
- Education: Queens College, California Institute of Arts
- Occupations: Author, home designer, consultant

Fernando Pages Ruiz is an Argentinian–American homebuilder and writer. He is the founder and former president of Brighton Construction Company, a company that built houses in Lincoln, Nebraska,it failed during the 2008 housing downturn.

He has written books and magazine articles about residential construction and affordable housing. He is the author of Building an Affordable House (2005) and Affordable Remodel (2007).

== Early life ==
Ruiz was born in Buenos Aires, Argentina in 1956 and raised in New York after his mother migrated to United States in 1970. He studied fine arts at Queens College before attending the California Institute of the Arts, where he received a bachelor of fine arts degree in 1984.

== Career ==
Ruiz entered the construction industry in California in 1984, working in residential development north of Los Angeles. In 1992, he moved to Lincoln, Nebraska and established Brighton Construction Company, specializing in affordable housing projects. Under his leadership, the company developed a multicultural neighborhood named Liberty Village which later received the Innovation in Workforce Housing Award from the National Association of Home Builders (NAHB) in 2007. In 2006, the U.S. Department of Housing and Urban Development selected Brighton Construction to build the PATH Concept Home through its Partnership for Advancing Technology in Housing program.

Brighton Construction ceased operating during the 2007–2008 housing downturn. Ruiz later worked as a commercial property inspector and catastrophe insurance adjuster. He later worked in Ecuador, where in 2014 he was named in the national daily El Telégrafo as the representative of the contractor installing satellite tracking equipment on artisanal fishing vessels under a government program. In 2018, Ruiz returned to the United States and has worked as a consultant to the Vinyl Siding Institute, now the Polymeric Exterior Products Association. Since 2024, he is working as homebuilder and developer in Houston, Texas.

== Writing ==
Pagés Ruiz has been writing for Fine Homebuilding in 2001 and has also been contributing to the Journal of Light Construction since 2009. In addition, he has written about modern yoga for Yoga Journal and contributed to Experience Life, where he was a contributing editor and also interviewed yoga teacher, Indra Devi.

== Publications ==
- Building an Affordable House: Trade Secrets to High-Value, Low-Cost Construction (Taunton Press, 2005)
- Affordable Remodel: How to Get Custom Results on Any Budget (The Taunton Press, 2007)
- Architectural Design for Traditional Neighborhoods (Vinyl Siding Institute, 2019)
- Architectural Polymers: Best Practices For Architectural Specifications (Vinyl Siding Institute, 2021)
- Shallow Foundation Design, Construction, and Repair (Building Affordable, 2021)
- Construction Details for Energy Code Compliance: Polymeric Cladding Over Continuous Insulation (Polymeric Exterior Products Association, 2024)
- Building an Affordable House, Second Edition: Trade Secrets to High-Value, Low-Cost Construction (The Taunton Press, 2024)
- Housing the Nation: Social Equity, Architecture, and the Future of Affordable Housing (Rizzoli, 2024)
