= List of newspapers in Honduras =

This is a list of newspapers in Honduras.

== Newspapers ==
- Diez
- La Gazzeta (official government newspaper)
- El Caribe
- El Heraldo
- Honduras This Week (in English) 1989-2009
- Honduras Weekly (in English)
- El Periódico
- La Prensa
- El Tiempo
- La Tribuna (Honduras)
- Diario C24 (Honduras)

== See also ==
- Media of Honduras
