= List of newspapers in Montserrat =

This is a list of newspapers currently published in Montserrat.

== Weekly ==
- The Montserrat Reporter – Davy Hill
- Alliouagana Express – Davy Hill, community news

== Official ==
- Government of Montserrat News

== News websites ==
- Montserrat Focus
- ZJB News
- Discover MNI
- MNI Alive

== See also ==
- List of newspapers
