= Alipe Reylof =

Dutch theologian (1612–1682)

Alipe Reylof (1612–1682) was a theologian from the Habsburg Netherlands.

== Life ==
Born in 1612, Reylof joined the Augustinian Hermits and made his profession in 1632. He was ordained to the priesthood in 1636. He taught philosophy at his order's house in Ghent for six years, and later theology in Bruges and Leuven. In 1652 he was appointed prior in Ypres, and in 1655 in Ghent. On 15 October 1671 the general of his order awarded him a doctorate of theology. Towards the end of his life he resigned from teaching and scholarship to focus on preaching and providing spiritual direction. He died in Ghent on 30 December 1682.

== Writings ==
- Libri de anima ad mentem Sancti Augustini (Ghent: Maximiliaan Graet, 1664); dedicated to Gerelinus Borluut.
