= El Periódico =

El Periódico is Spanish for "The Journal" and may refer to:

- El Periódico (Barcelona), a Spanish newspaper
- El Periódico de Aragón, a Spanish newspaper
- El Periódico (Guatemala)
- El Periódico (Honduras)
