= Michael Jackson (journalist) =

Niuean journalist and former politician

Naea Michael Jackson NCSS is a Niuean journalist and former politician who is the owner of Niue Star.

== Career ==
In the 1970s and 1980s, he was the government printer and government press photographer in Niue. He published the Tohi Tala Niue, Niue's government-owned weekly newspaper. In 1991, he set up a private printing business, and, in 1993, launched the weekly Niue Star, which at the time was the country's only printed newspaper. Jackson is the Star's owner, editor, journalist and photographer.

Also in 1993, Jackson stood successfully for Parliament in that year's general election. He later became an associate minister, and remained a member of Parliament until 2008, when he was defeated in the general election. He stated that there was "no conflict of interest" between his being a journalist and a member of government, because "we have a law to prevent us MPs from taking advantage of our positions".

He is reportedly better known in Niue than his internationally more famous namesake, to the point that, when news of singer Michael Jackson's death reached Niue in July 2009, "most residents of the remote coral atoll (sic) thought that it was him (sic) who had died".

In the 2023 Niue National Awards he was awarded the Niue Community Service Star.

== Personal life ==
Jackson's paternal grandfather was English, hence his surname.
