= List of newspapers in Saint Vincent and the Grenadines =

This is a list of newspapers in Saint Vincent and the Grenadines.

== Weekly ==
- The News
- The Vincentian
- Searchlight

== Daily ==
- The Herald

== Other ==
- SVG Express
- The VincyView

== See also ==
- Lists of newspapers
