= Dashdorj Bayarkhuu =

Mongolian diplomat and writer

- Born: Ulaanbaatar, Mongolia
- Employer: Ministry of Foreign Affairs (2015–2016; 2001–2008; 1996–1998) Embassy of Mongolia to Arab Republic of Egypt (2008–2012) Japan Institute of International Affairs (2002–2003) Embassy of Mongolia to India (1998–2001) National University of Mongolia (1993–1996) Montsame (1986–1990; 1983–1984)

Dashdorj Bayarkhuu (born May 4, 1956) is a Mongolian research professor, columnist and writer and former ambassador of Mongolia to Egypt. Prior to his nomination to the ambassadorial position, Bayarkhuu worked in media, defense, diplomatic and educational sectors. After his tenure as ambassador in Cairo, Bayarkhuu returned to academic field as a visiting professor of international politics and contracted researcher. He joined the Ministry of Foreign Affairs of Mongolia as deputy director, Policy Planning & Co-ordination Department in 2015–2016.

== Early life and education ==
Born in Ulaanbaatar, Mongolia, Bayarkhuu was raised in Ulaanbaatar, where his parents worked as documentary film director and photographer. He earned a B.A., M.A. in Chinese studies from National University of Mongolia in 1979. He earned a diploma in international relations from Diplomatic Academy of the Ministry of Foreign Affairs of the Russian Federation in 1993.

He studied and qualified in Military commander course in 1980, Communist Party Higher School, C.P.S.U. Novosibirsk, U.S.S.R. in 1990, Netherlands Institute of International Relations "Clingendael", The Hague, Netherlands in 1994, Erasmus University Rotterdam, Netherlands in 1994, International Seminar for Young Leading Diplomats from Asia, Ministry of Foreign Affairs of Israel in 1996, Institute of Diplomacy and Foreign Relations, PM's Department, Malaysia, Kuala Lumpur in 2004, International Training Workshop: Education and Public Information Outreach on the Millennium Development Goals, Unites Nations Department of Public Information, Beijing, China in 2004, Asia-Pacific Center for Security Studies, PACOM, Honolulu, Hawaii, USA in 2006, Moscow State Institute of International Relations in 2016.

Bayarkhuu received a professor in international politics from Academy of Sciences in 2003.

== Career ==
After graduating National University of Mongolia, Bayarkhuu worked one year as a translator-editor (Chinese) at Foreign Broadcasting Service, National Radio of Mongolia in 1979–1980, and was recruited to the army in June 1980 at the age of 24. While serving at the Mongolian army, Bayarkhuu studied at Military commander course and worked as military officer, lieutenant in 1980–1983. He was also translator at the Mongolia-China border inspection discussion in 1982.

After being demobilized from the army in December 1983, Bayarkhuu worked as translator and editor at the Mongolian Central Government Telegraphic Agency “MONTSAME” in Ulaanbaatar, Mongolia from January to October 1984. Later in 1984–1985, he was transferred to the Ministry of Foreign Affairs and promoted to administrative and consular officer at the Embassy of Mongolia to People's Republic of China. After serving his duty in Beijing, Bayarkhuu continued to work at MONTSAME Agency in 1986–1988 as editor, Bulletin of International Affairs of The Time magazine in Mongolian. Subsequently, he became the editor-in-chief of The Time, which was the first magazine that focused on international affairs.

Bayarkhuu is one of the supporters and participants of the Mongolian Democratic Revolution during the period of 1989–1990. He wrote about democratic ideology, freedom and reformation in The Time magazine that attracted many readers.

In autumn of 1990, Bayarkhuu went to Moscow with his family to study at the Diplomatic Academy of Ministry of Foreign Affairs, U.S.S.RDiplomatic Academy of the Ministry of Foreign Affairs of the Russian Federation. He observed the process of splitting U.S.S.R. and formation of new Russia. Bayarkhuu finished the Academy specializing in Soviet and Russian international policies.

He was invited by National University of Mongolia and became professor at National University of Mongolia, School of Foreign Service in 1993–1998 and 2001–2005.

Bayarkhuu joined Democratic Party and spread publications about democratic ideology through Mongolia. The party acknowledged Bayarkhuu's effort and offered him to run for parliamentary election in 1996, which he denied.

Democratic party won the election and Bayarkhuu was recruited to deputy director general, Policy Planning and Coordination Department at the Ministry of External Relations of Mongolia in 1996–1998. He was endorsed by the minister of foreign affairs to serve as counsellor at the Embassy of Mongolia to India, New Delhi. He returned to Mongolia in 2001 and worked as counsellor at Policy Planning, Information and Monitoring Department, Ministry of Foreign Affairs of Mongolia for one year and went to Japan with his family. He was invited by Japanese former diplomat and law professor Hisashi Owada, the president of Japan Institute of International Affairs, and worked as visiting research fellow at Japan Institute of International Affairs in Tokyo in 2002–2003.

After returning to Mongolia, Bayarkhuu became senior counsellor, Policy Planning, Information & Monitoring Department, Ministry of Foreign Affairs of Mongolia in 2003–2008. He was the managing editor, Diplomatic Bluebook-2006, which was published by the Ministry of Foreign Affairs.

Bayarkhuu was promoted to Ambassador Extraordinary and Plenipotentiary to Arab Republic of Egypt and worked for four years from 2008 to 2012. During his tenure in Egypt, he also acted as Concurrent Ambassador Extraordinary and Plenipotentiary to State of Kuwait in 2009, First Concurrent Ambassador Extraordinary and Plenipotentiary to Kingdom of Saudi Arabia in 2009–2014, Concurrent Ambassador Extraordinary and Plenipotentiary to Islamic Republic of Iran in 2012–2015 and was responsible of serving at 14 countries in Middle East. He summarized incidents of Arab Spring that took place in the Middle East and published two books, the first ever publication about Arabian history in Mongolian.

After returning from Cairo, he was invited as guest professor to many institutes and schools where he delivered presentations about diplomatic studies and Arabian spring. In 2013–2014, he worked as Chief Editor of Britannica's Edition on the Foreign Policy of Mongolia at NEPKO Publishing in Ulaanbaatar. He is the author and biographer of the book “Jambyn Batmunkh”, a NEPKO Publishing’s publications on another diplomatic person's life.

Bayarkhuu has Envoy Extraordinary and Plenipotentiary Diplomatic Rank.

=== Science title ===
Professor in International Politics, Academy of Sciences of Mongolia (Since 2003).

Field of Research Specializations

Foreign policy analysis, foreign policy-making process, history of diplomacy, contemporary international relations, contemporary international studies, geopolitics and security, comparative politics, communist studies and transition politics, sinology and oriental studies.

=== Current academic activities ===
Contracted researcher at Institute for Strategic Studies, National Security Counsel of Mongolia; Contracted researcher at Institute of International Studies, Academy of Sciences of Mongolia; visiting professor and editor at National Academy of Governance, Government of Mongolia; columnist and member of the board, the Government Newspaper.

== Works ==
=== Books published (in Mongolian) ===
- International Relations in the Twentieth Century Political Education Academy, Ulaanbaatar, Mongolia, 1994, 224 pages
- Global Politics and International Relations: Key Trends of the 1990s Political Education Academy, Ulaanbaatar, 1995, 337 pages
- Mongolian Diplomacy and Some Aspects of International Relations School of Foreign Service, National University of Mongolia Ulaanbaatar, 1996, 147 pages
- Mongolia's Democracy: Populism or Fascism INTEPRESS, Ulaanbaatar, 1997, 195 pages
- Portrait of Twentieth Century (Joint Authorship with B.Baabar) T&U Printing, Ulaanbaatar, 1997, 450 pages
- Contemporary International Relations and New World Order School of Foreign Service, National University of Mongolia Ulaanbaatar, 1998, 324 pages
- International Relations and Geopolitical Interests INTERPRESS, Ulaanbaatar, 2000, 208 pages
- Geopolitics for Eurasia and International Relations: Present and Future School of Foreign Service, National University of Mongolia Ulaanbaatar, 2002, 270 pages
- Geopolitics for Eurasia and International Relations: Past, Present and Future School of Foreign Service, National University of Mongolia Institute of International Studies, Academy of Sciences of Mongolia Ulaanbaatar, 2003, 2005, 380 pages
- Theory and Practice of International Relations School of Foreign Service, National University of Mongolia Ulaanbaatar, 2003, 80 pages
- Mongolia: From Communism to Capitalism MONSUDAR Publishing House, Ulaanbaatar, 2004, 270 pages
- Lectures on Geopolitics Mongolian Future Society, Ulaanbaatar, 2007, 240 pages
- XXI Century: Prognosis and Perspectives Mongolian Future Society, Ulaanbaatar, 2007, 142 pages
- Who are we? NEPKO Publishing, Ulaanbaatar, 2007, 340 pages
- The True Story of My Life NEPKO Publishing, Ulaanbaatar, 2009, 550 pages
- Tahrir Revolution NEPKO Publishing, Ulaanbaatar, 2011, 534 pages
- Authors of the Modern History of the World (Joint Authorship with B.Baabar) NEPKO Publishing, Ulaanbaatar, 2012, 430 pages
- Tahrir Revolution (Second Edition) NEPKO Publishing, Ulaanbaatar, 2013, 552 pages
- Tahrir Second Revolution NEPKO Publishing, Ulaanbaatar, 2013, 410 pages
- Jambyn Batmunkh, Biography NEPKO Publishing, Ulaanbaatar, 2015, 420 pages
- Jambyn Batmunkh, Biography (Second Edition) NEPKO Publishing, Ulaanbaatar, 2015, 430 pages
- Permanent Neutrality in the International Relations & Mongolia’s Foreign Policy NEPKO Publishing, Ulaanbaatar, 2016, 130 pages
- The Saying of the Scholar /Sudlaachyn ug/, Ulaanbaatar 2017, 640 pages

=== Books translated or edited (from English and Russian into Mongolian) ===
- Samuel P.Huntington. The Clash of Civilizations and the Remaking of World Order, Open Society Forum, MONSUDAR Publishing House, Ulaanbaatar, 2005, 390 pages
- Leonid Mlechin. Lenin, NEPKO Publishing, Ulaanbaatar, 2013, 510 pages
- Donald J. Trump. Great Again: How to Fix Our Crippled America, Ulaanbaatar, 2017, 204 pages

=== Articles in English (published in India) ===
- Dashdorj Bayarkhuu. Changing Mongolia in a New Environment, "Business Asia” October 1999
- Dashdorj Bayarkhuu. A New World Order in the Asia – Pacific Region: A Mongolian Perspective, “World Affairs” Volume 3 Number 4, October–December 1999
- Dashdorj Bayarkhuu. Mongolian Foreign Policy in the Changing World, "China Report" (A Journal of East Asian Studies), Volume 36 Numbers 1, January–March, 2000
- Dashdorj Bayarkhuu. Globalisation and Civilisation, “The Supreme Saviour” Vol. No 95, 16–31 October 2000
- Dashdorj Bayarkhuu. New World Order: A Debate on Geopolitics, “Encounter”, November/December 2000, Vol.3, No 6
- Dashdorj Bayarkhuu. Globalism and Globalisation: Economic and Geopolitical Imperatives, “Liberal Times”, Vol. VIII/ Number 3. 2000
- D.Bayarkhuu. Mongolia and Its third Neighbours, “Himalayan and Central Asian Studies”, Vol. 5 No 1 January–March, 2001
- Dashdorjiin Bayarkhuu. Mongolia in New Context: Amid Big Power Games and Geopolitical Moves, “Encounter”, March/April 2001, Vol.4, No 2

=== Brochures and major papers in English (published in India, Japan and Mongolia) ===
- Dashdorj Bayarkhuu. The Challenge of Globalization and the Shaping of New World Order, Rajiv Gandhi Institute for Contemporary Studies Working Paper, No 14, 2000
- D.Bayarkhuu. Asia Pacific – A Region of Globalisation and Competition in the 21st Century, RGICS Working Paper, No 26, 2001
- Dashdorjiin Bayarkhuu. New Central Asia: The New Paradigm, New Paradox and Counterbalance, Institute for Strategic Studies, Regional Security Issues and Mongolia, No 12, 2001
- Dashdorjiin Bayarkhuu. Advancing Globalization: Towards a New World Political and Economic Order, Institute for Strategic Studies, Regional Security Issues and Mongolia, No 13, 2002
- Bayarkhuu Dashdorj. Post-Communist Transition in the Asia Pacific: Towards a New Political Order, Japan Institute of International Affairs, Tokyo, 2003, Occasional Paper 19
- Dashdorjiin Bayarkhuu. Geopolitics of the New Central Asia, “World Affairs” (Special Issue) Volume 8 Number 1, January–March 2004
