= Hango =

Hango may refer to:

- Hangö, the Swedish name of the bilingual port town of Hanko, Uusimaa, Finland
- Remote Solution, South Korean electronics company formerly known as HanGo Electronics
- Hango Hill, hill near Castletown, Isle of Man

People with the name Hango include:

- Hango (general), second-in-command of Atoc at the Battle of Chimborazo
- Angeline Hango (1905–1995), Canadian writer
- Keithley Hango, founder of Vanuatu's Pentecost Star
- Lisa Hango, American politician
