= Timeline of Tegucigalpa =

The following is a timeline of the history of the city of Tegucigalpa, Honduras.

== Prior to 20th century ==
- 1561 - Roman Catholic diocese of Comayagua established
- 1578 - Silver mines discovered
- 1786 - Tegucigalpa Cathedral building completed.
- 1812 - Political unrest.
- 1821 - Tegucigalpa attains city status.
- 1822 - Mallol Bridge built
- 1877 - Telegraph begins operating.
- 1880 - Tegucigalpa becomes capital of Honduras.
- 1889 - Banco de Honduras founded

== 20th century ==
- 1905 - Population: about 35,000.
- 1907 - Tegucigalpa was occupied by Nicaraguan invaders.
- 1912
  - El Cronista newspaper begins publication.
  - Club Deportivo Olimpia (football club) formed.
- 1915 - Teatro Nacional Manuel Bonilla (theatre) opens.
- 1920 - Population: 38,950.
- 1928 - Club Deportivo Motagua (football club) formed.
- 1934 - Toncontín Airport begins operating.
- 1937 - Distrito Central created.
- 1946 - American School of Tegucigalpa established.
- 1948 - Estadio Tiburcio Carías Andino (stadium) opens.
- 1950 - Population: 72,385 city; 99,948 urban agglomeration.
- 1961 - Population: 164,941.
- 1973 - Population: 274,850 city; 302,483 urban agglomeration.
- 1977 - La Tribuna newspaper begins publication.
- 1984 - Military leader "Alvarez is deposed amid anti-American demonstrations in Tegucigalpa."
- 1986 - Population: 597,512 (estimate).
- 1989
  - 25 January: Alvarez assassinated.
  - 21 October: Airplane crash.
- 1993 - El Periódico newspaper begins publication.
- 1998 - October: Hurricane Mitch occurs.

== 21st century ==
- 2003 - Population: 858,437.
- 2009 - 28 June: 2009 Honduran coup d'état.
- 2011 - Torre Sky hi-rise built.^{(es)}
- 2013 - Population: 1,157,509.
- 2014 - Nasry Asfura becomes mayor.

== See also ==
- Tegucigalpa history
- List of mayors of Tegucigalpa

== Bibliography ==
=== in English ===
- "Tegucigalpa" . Encyclopædia Britannica. Vol. 26 (11th ed.). 1910. p. 506.
- "Honduras: Tegucigalpa". Trade Directory of Central America and the West Indies. Washington DC: US Department of Commerce. 1915.
- Glenn Pearce-Oroz (2012). "Causes and consequences of rapid urban spatial segregation: the new towns of Tegucigalpa". In David P. Varady (ed.). Desegregating the City: Ghettos, Enclaves, and Inequality. State University of New York Press. ISBN 978-0-7914-8328-2.

=== in Spanish ===
- Leticia de Oyuela (1989). Historia mínima de Tegucigalpa: vista a través de las fiestas del patrono San Miguel a partir de 1680 hasta fines del siglo XIX (in Spanish). Editorial Guaymuras. ISBN 978-99926-15-92-8.
- Marvin Barahona (2005). "Cronologia de la reforma liberal de 1876 al ano 2000". Honduras en el siglo XX: una síntesis histórica (in Spanish). Editorial Guaymuras. ISBN 978-99926-33-36-6.
