= List of newspapers in Uruguay =

This is a list of newspapers in Uruguay.

== Current Newspapers ==
- Brecha (Montevideo) Digital edition
- Búsqueda (Montevideo) Digital edition
- El Observador (Montevideo) Digital edition
- El País (Montevideo) Digital edition
- La Diaria (Montevideo) Digital edition
- La República (Montevideo) Digital edition
- MercoPress (Montevideo) Digital edition
- Últimas Noticias (Montevideo) Digital edition
- El Telégrafo (Paysandú) Digital edition

== Defunct newspapers ==
- El Día (Montevideo)
- El Diario (Montevideo)
- La Mañana (Montevideo)
- The Montevideo Times (Montevideo)
- Germinal (Montevideo)
- Acción
- El Plata

== See also ==
- List of newspapers
