= List of newspapers in Åland =

This is a list of newspapers currently published in Åland.

== Daily ==
- Ålandstidningen
- Nya Åland

== Official ==
- Press releases from the Government of Åland

== See also ==
- List of newspapers
