= L'Hebdo du Vanuatu =

- Type: Weekly newspaper
- Founded: 2008
- Language: French
- Headquarters: Port Vila

L'Hebdo du Vanuatu is a ni-Vanuatu weekly newspaper. Launched on 11 December 2008, it is the first newspaper in Vanuatu published exclusively in the French language. French is one of Vanuatu's three official languages, along with Bislama and English.

The newspaper was launched by Gene Wong and Marc Neil-Jones of the anglophone Vanuatu Daily Post, with support from the European Union and the French embassy in Vanuatu. Its intended readership are francophone ni-Vanuatu, both in Vanuatu itself and in neighbouring, French-speaking New Caledonia. It also covers news from both countries.

Each issue is sold for Vt100 or CFP150.
