= List of newspapers in Anguilla =

This is a list of newspapers currently published in Anguilla, a British territory in the Caribbean.

== Weekly ==
- The Anguillian – The Valley

== Official ==
- Government of Anguilla Document Library – Meeting minutes and statements of the Executive Council and House of Assembly
- Anguilla Official Gazette

== News websites ==
- Anguilla Focus

== See also ==
- List of newspapers
