= List of newspapers in the Gambia =

This is a list of newspapers currently published in The Gambia.

== Daily ==
- The Daily Observer
- The Point
- Today Newspaper

== Biweekly ==
- Foroyaa
- The Independent

== News websites ==
- Freedom Newspaper – online^{[usurped]}
- The Standard – online
- The Daily News – online

== See also ==
- List of newspapers
