= List of newspapers in Suriname =

This is a list of newspapers in Suriname. They are published in Paramaribo unless otherwise noted.

Publication name	Website
Chung Fa Dagblad (Chinese Daily News)	chungfadaily.com
De Ware Tijd (The True Time)	dwtonline.com
De West (The West)	dagbladdewest.com
Dagblad Suriname (Daily News Suriname)	dbsuriname.com
GFC Nieuws (GFC News)	gfcnieuws.com
Kong Ngie Tong Sang Dagblad	
Star Nieuws (Star News)	starnieuws.com
Suriname Herald	srherald.com
Times of Suriname	surinametimes.com
United News	unitednews.sr
Waterkant (Waterfront)	

Suriname Nieuws (srnieuws.com) collects current articles from these papers.

== Defunct newspapers ==
- 1774-1790: Weeklyksche Woensdaagsche Surinaams(ch)e Courant
- 1785-1793: De Surinaamsche Nieuwsvertelder
- 1792: Gazette de Surinam
- 1792-1793: Teutsches Wochenblatt für Surinam
- 1793-1797: Weeklyksche Surinaamsche Courant
- 1794: Saturdagsche Courant van Nieuws, Smaak en Vernuft
- 1804-1806: Bataafsche Surinaamsche Courant
- 1804-1809: Binnenlandsche Surinaamsche Courant
- 1805-1814: Surinaamsche Courant / The Surinam Gazette (Dutch / English)
- 1811-1829: Geprivilegeerde Surinaamsche Courant
- 1842-1872: De Kolonist. Dagblad toegewijd aan de belangen van Suriname
- 1845-1862: Surinaamsch Weekblad, voortgezet in De West-Indiër
- 1848-1870: Koloniaal Nieuwsblad, voortgezet in Suriname (krant)
- 1863-1898: De West-Indiër
- 1871-1943: Suriname
- 1894-1955: De Surinamer
- 1929-1936: De Banier van Waarheid en Recht
- 1943-1978: Lam Foeng
- 1943-1957: Het Nieuws
- 1949-1950: Reveille
- 1952-1957: De Tijd
- 1954-1967: Nieuw Suriname
- 1957-1972: Tsu-Yu
- 1969-1982: De Vrije Stem

== Magazines ==
- Parbode (Paramaribo) parbode.com

=== Defunct magazines ===
- De Vrije Stem (1960–1982)
- OSO (1982-2017) Free download of all editions

== See also ==
- List of newspapers
