= List of newspapers in Tonga =

This is a list of newspapers in Tonga.

Tonga has four weekly newspapers: the Times of Tonga (Taimi o Tonga), the Talaki, the Kele‘a, the Kakalu 'o Tonga, and the Ita. A fifth, the Tonga Chronicle, ceased publication in May 2011. In April 2012, the Tongan government announced the imminent launch of a new weekly newspaper, which might or might not be a revival of the Tonga Chronicle.

In addition, Matangi Tonga is an online newspaper.

== See also ==
- List of newspapers
