= The Bulletin (Belgian magazine) =

English-language news magazine

- Cover of The Bulletin
- Categories: News magazine
- First issue: 1962
- Company: Bulletin Media SRL
- Country: Belgium
- Based in: Brussels
- Language: English
- Website: www.thebulletin.be

The Bulletin is an English-language news magazine based in Brussels, Belgium. Founded in 1962 as a weekly magazine, it is the oldest media outlet in English in Belgium and remains one of the oldest English-language publications in Continental Europe. Today, it claims a monthly online audience of 150,000 unique readers mostly from the large expatriate community of the European Union's capital. Publication became quarterly in 2012.

Regular contributors in the past have included the author and one-time British Labour MP Dick Leonard, who wrote about Belgian politics, and John Palmer, former Europe Editor of The Guardian and former Political Director of the European Policy Centre.

== History ==
"From now on, non-Belgian, English-speaking residents have a voice of their own. That voice: The Bulletin. YOUR weekly." – Monique Ackroyd, 1962

On 21 September 1962, Monique Ackroyd successfully completed the first issue of The Bulletin. Created in the basement of her Uccle home, it was 8 pages and cost 5 Belgian francs. The publication was greeted enthusiastically by the English-speaking community: by the second issue, it had grown to 12 pages. Although things were going well with The Bulletin, it wasn't until 1967 with the move of NATO headquarters from Paris to Brussels that readership really took off. With a new office in Uccle, the magazine's circulation grew and the number of pages doubled to 48. By 1969, circulation had grown to 3,000, enabling yet another relocation of The Bulletin office to the Sablon area, above the Vieux St. Martin restaurant.

In 1971, one of The Bulletin's freelance writers, Sunday Times journalist John Lambert, encouraged by the then editor, Aislinn Dulanty, decided to launch a campaign to ban traffic in the Grand-Place. A petition resulted in a partial success in March 1971, when drivers were banned from parking, but through traffic was still allowed. The Bulletin kept fighting. The staff organized a protest picnic held on 25 June. "Bring your children, your grandmother, your umbrella (just in case)," urged the posters. The response was sensational, and hugely successful.

Due to such positive campaigns as well as the expansion of the EEC and expatriate community in Brussels, Ackroyd Publications launched What's On, an entertainment guide, in 1975. Three years later, the growing company moved into new offices, located on Avenue Louise.

The Bulletin was on a roll in the 1980s. It was a recognized publication, producing serious journalism that reflected the changing urban scene. It had Cleveland Moffett's reflective Rambler columns covering many aspects of urban life, Dick Leonard explaining the nuances of Belgian politics and Geoff Meade's wry stories on living in Belgium with his Meadelets and catlets. By 1986, its cash flow was healthy enough to pay for a smart corner mansion on Avenue Molière.

In the 1990s there was a change of editor, from Aislinn Dulanty to her daughter, Brigid Grauman. The Bulletin continued its successful ascent by recruiting new journalists, and launching several titles, including a design magazine called Look and an inflight magazine for the Belgian national airline Sabena.

Between 1992 and 1994, The Bulletin reported on a campaign led by expats of differing nationalities against BBC's Radio 4. It was thought that the service was to be stopped, causing outrage amongst its listeners. Even though the true situation came to light as being just a switch from long waves to FM, a protest organization was still founded. North Europe Save Radio 4 sent petitions and faxes until BBC agreed to keep the programme on long wave.

In 2007, Ackroyd Publications was acquired by Corelio, the Flemish media group now known as Mediahuis that publishes several Belgian dailies in both Dutch and French. Derek Blyth then became editor-in-chief. In 2011, Deborah Forsyth became acting editor-in-chief, followed later in the year by Tamara Gausi as editor-in-chief.

In 2012, The Bulletin announced it was printing its final edition in July of that year. This was stated in a letter to subscribers that offered a refund for those who had signed up to a longer term subscription. The announcement stated that due to changes in the market, including the role played by the internet, The Bulletin would no longer be a printed magazine but would continue as an online publication. This online publication was previously an offshoot of The Bulletin called xpats.com. Since then, The Bulletin has continued to publish a quarterly print edition.

In 2022, The Bulletin's 60th anniversary year, the title was acquired by Bulletin Media SRL, a company led by previous editor-in-chief, Sarah Crew, who assumed the role of publisher-editor. Under new independent ownership, The Bulletin announced that it would "reinforce its role as a community-focused source of news and information".

== See also ==
- List of magazines in Belgium
- The Brussels Times
