= List of newspapers in Nicaragua =

This is a list of newspapers in Nicaragua.

== Newspapers ==
Publication	Circulation (2014)	Owner (2014)	Frequency	Language
Bolsa de Noticias	3,500	Grupo Emigdio Suárez Ediciones	Daily	Spanish
La Prensa	42,600	Editora La Prensa SA	Daily	Spanish

== Other Newspapers ==
- El 19 (Managua) (daily, digital)
- 7 Días (Managua) (bi-weekly)
- Confidencial (Managua) (daily, digital)
- La Jornada (Managua) (daily, digital)
- El Mercurio (Managua) (weekly)
- Metro (Managua) (daily)
- Notifax (Managua) (newsletter, daily)
- El Nuevo Diario (Managua) (daily)
- Períodico HOY (Managua) (daily)
- La Trinchera de la Noticia (Managua) (newsletter, Monday to Friday)

=== No longer in circulation ===
- El Nuevo Diario (Managua)
- Barricada (FSLN) (Managua) (out of business)
- La Brújula Semanal (Managua) (weekly)
- La Crónica (Managua) (out of business)
- La Noticia (Managua) (out of business)
- Novedades (Managua) (out of business)
- El Semanario (Managua) (out of business)
- Tiempos del Mundo (Managua) (out of business)
- La Tribuna (Managua) (out of business)

== See also ==
- Media of Nicaragua

== Bibliography ==
- Willings Press Guide World News Media 2015. Vol. 2. Cision UK Ltd. 2015. ISBN 978-1-906035-69-3.
