= List of newspapers in French Guiana =

This is a list of newspapers in French Guiana.

- France-Guyane (Cayenne)
- Guyane la 1ère (Malakoff, France)

== Magazines ==
- Une Saison en Guyane (Cayenne)

== See also ==
- List of newspapers
