= List of newspapers in Guinea =

This is a list of newspapers currently published in Guinea. Very few newspapers are distributed outside the capital, Conakry. Moreover, there is no organized distribution channel for the written press; It is therefore often carried out informally.

== History ==
The history of the written press in Guinea is linked to that of Guinea itself. The written press appeared during the period of colonization, with Catholic missionaries being the originators. Introduced for the service of the colonizers, it became a tool used in the anti-colonial struggle. Between 1945 and independence in 1958, the press provided coverage of both ruling and opposition groups. Freedom of information was restricted by the government of Ahmed Sekou Toure. "After the seizure of power by a junta in 1984, the establishment of a multiparty system contributed to the establishment of press freedom in the early 1990s".

== List of newspapers ==
Guinea has no daily newspapers except Horoya, the government newspaper; Regular titles are essentially weekly, monthly and bi-monthly.

- Le Lynx, a weekly satirical newspaper created in 1992.
- L'Indépendant, an independent weekly newspaper created in 1992.
- Horoya, a government newspaper; It initially enjoyed the "monopoly of subscriptions with diplomatic missions and government administration".
- L'Événement de Guinée.
- L'Enquêteur, created by Boubacar Yacine Diallo.
- Actu-Elles.info created by Aminata Pilimini Diallo.
- Bulletin224.com created by Gilbert Tounkara in 2020.
- Dounet Magazine created by Fatoumata Keita in 2015.

In addition to these independent newspapers, many political parties have their own papers.

== See also ==
- List of newspapers
