= Niue Star =

Niuean weekly newspaper

- Type: Monthly
- Owner: Michael Jackson
- Publisher: Michael Jackson
- Editor-in-chief: Michael Jackson
- Editor: Michael Jackson
- Founded: 11 June 1993
- Political alignment: Independent
- Language: English, Niuean
- Headquarters: Auckland (formerly Alofi)
- Circulation: 200 (in 2023)

The Niue Star is a monthly (previously weekly) Niuean newspaper, founded on 11 June 1993. It is Niue's only newspaper. Its founder, owner, editor, journalist and photographer is and has always been Michael Jackson. The newspaper is distributed in Niue, New Zealand and previously Australia, and had a circulation of 800 in 2005, which had dropped to 200 by the time of its 30th anniversary in 2023. It is a bilingual newspaper, published both in English and in Niuean. In 2023, about a quarter of its content was written in English and about three quarters in Niuean.

== History ==
The Niue Star was founded with the assistance of AESOPS, which provided Jackson with equipment including a computer, a digital camera and a printing press. It also provided Jackson with a journalism course. The latter had previously worked as publisher of the now-defunct government newspaper Tohi Tala Niue, but set up the private Niue Star as his own initiative.

The Star was originally printed in Alofi, until its main office and printing shop were destroyed by Cyclone Heta in 2004. It then moved to Auckland.

According to its editor Michael Jackson in 2008,

"The Niue Star is the community newspaper. Now it's mainly information, village happenings, community happenings, family interest stories like hair cuttings and ear piercing. The good thing about it is that all our families in New Zealand and Australia are looking forward for the Niue Star to read how, you know, what goes on back home and to see these colourful photographs. So that's my market."

Jackson also reports on political news ("[I]f the government is, you know, not doing the right thing and the people want to know, then I will insist in reporting it."), and, through the Star, aims to "connect Niueans wherever they are". A large majority of Niueans live outside Niue itself, which, due to continuous emigration, had a population of barely 1000 in 2008. Most Niuean expatriates live in New Zealand, where the Niue Star is distributed within the Niuean community, giving them access to church news and to photographs and descriptions of family members taking part in village events in Niue.

From a peak of about 1,700, circulation by 2023 had dropped to just 200, in Niue and in Auckland, and the formerly weekly newspaper was now published only monthly. The newspaper had a website, niuestar.online, but it does not exist anymore.
