= Maximiliaan Graet =

Maximiliaan Graet (active 1647–1676) was a printer in the city of Ghent in the County of Flanders in the Spanish Netherlands.

== Career ==
The printing shop at the Sign of the Angel in Ghent, founded by Gerlac Graet, was initially not particularly noteworthy. After inheriting it, Gerlac's eldest son, Maximiliaan, turned it into a flourishing business which has been called "the most celebrated printing house in 17th-century Ghent", although a document from 1664 suggests that Maximiliaan at first had some difficulty in obtaining a printing licence of his own to continue the business.

Under the printing regulations introduced in 1658, Graet also served as one of the two "visitors" (inspectors) responsible for ensuring that printers were abiding by their restrictions. In this capacity, he initiated proceedings against Herman Typer for the unlicensed sale of engravings, songs and almanacs.

At the end of 1666, Graet launched Ghent's first weekly newspaper, the Ghendtsche Post-Tydinghen, which continued to be published by his family for the next 54 years. In November 1669, he was appointed official printer to the city.

Graet died in 1676, and his business was continued by his widow (died 1682) and then by their heirs.

== Publications ==
1647

- Jacob de Keysere, Sekere remedien voor de ellenden van desen tijt. Gherepresenteert in een voorbeeldinge vande waerachtige bekeeringhe ende penitentie van die van Ninive (printed for Baudweyn vanden Berghe)

1651

- (Jesuit College, Ghent), David en Ionathas voorbeelt van oprechte vrientschap (programme for a school play performed in September 1651)

1652

- Edward Knott, Infidelity Unmasked, or The Confutation of a Booke, Published by M. William Chillingworth, under this Title: The Religion of Protestants a Safe Way to Salvation'

1653

- (Jesuit College, Ghent), Tragedie Jephte, rechter des Volckx Israel
- (Nuns of Oosteeklo Abbey), Institution de la Confrérie du méliflue docteur S. Bernard, signale favori de la Vierge-Mère, en l'abbaye d'Oost-Eecloo

1655

- Aegidius de Lalaing (OP), Historie van 't Beghinsel, Voort-Ganck, Wtnementheden, Gratien, Aflaten, ende Mirakelen, van het doorluchtigh ende wyt-vermaert Artsch-Broederschap Des H. Roosen-Crans, vande Alder-heylighste altijt Maghet ende Moeder Godts Maria
- (Augustinian College, Ghent), De heylighe vyf wonden ons saligh-makers Iesv Christi (a school play performed in September 1655)

1657

- Arnout Van Geluwe, Corte Antwoorde, Op een onschriftmatige gereformeerde vraghe raeckende het H. Sacrament des Autaers
- Joannes van der Elst, Notae Augustinianae sive Musices Figurae seu Notae Novae Concinendis Modulis Faciliores

1658

- Arnout Van Geluwe, Beghonnen Proces ofte Reden-Kamp-Stryt, tusschen Arnout Van Geluwe Vlaemschen Boer ende Joannes Maelgie, Ghereformeerden Predicant
- Arnout Van Geluwe, Reden-Kamp-Stryt Tvsschen Eenen Vlaemschen Arendt ende een Hollandtsche Rave
- Nicolaus Breydel, Breviarium ofte Kort Begryp van het Leven vande H. Maghet en Martelaresse Barbara, besonder Patronesse vande Biechte, mitsgaders teghen de Peste ende onvoorsienighe doot
- James Mumford, The Question of Questions, which rightly solved resolveth all our Questions in Religion

1659

- Petrus Dierkens (OP), Exercitia Spiritualia Decem Dierum Cum optimis Regulis, ad perfectam dilectionem Dei consequendam
- Arnout Van Geluwe, Claer Bewys Dat Christus hier op der aerden geen duysent-jaerigh Rijcke en sal comen op-rechten, om met de Martelaeren inden vleessche duysent Iaeren te regneren, als Coningen ende Priesters, ghelijck de nieuwe Duysent-jaers-ghesinde Propheten, ofte genaemde wel-meenende Christenen van Amsterdam droomen

1660

- P.T.S.H., Letter-trompet uyt-gheblasen [...] van desen langh-ghewensten vrede, tusschen beyde de machtighste potentaten des christendoms (a poem celebrating the publication of the Peace of the Pyrenees; printed at the expense of Arnout van Geluwe)
- Petrus Dierkens (OP), Gheestelycke Oeffeninghen Van Thien Daghen
- Franciscus à Puero Jesu (O.Carm.), Seer Profytighe Onderwysinge voor alle Christen Gheloovighen om 't Heyligh Sacrament der Penitentie ofte Biechte wel ende salighlijck te ghebruycken
- Carolus Van Hoorn, Tractatus Marialis de laudibus et praerogativis B. M. V.
- Mirakelen ende wel-daeden verkreghen door het aenroepen vanden H.P. Franciscvs Xaverivs aen sijne hh. ghe-approbeerde reliquien rustende inde kercke vande societeyt Jesu tot Mechelen
- Esclaircissement du Droit de Souveraineté et Non-Ressort du Conseil. Ordonné en Flandres au Fait de Crimes et autres matieres de Hauteur, Noblesse et Seigneurie du Roy Nostre Sire en Comte Dudit Pays
- Justification du Souverain Droit de Dernier Ressort Competant à la Chambre Legale du Comte de Flandres

1661

- Motif de Droict pour Noble Seigneur Charles Lievin Sire du Qvesnoy Sr. de Lutzbecque, Le Loire, La Rosiere, &c. demandeur et impetrant de commission de mise de faict contre Messire Franchois De Chastel Sr. Despierre dict De La Hovardrie Mary et Bail de Dame Jenne du Quesnoy, Deffendeur impetrant de lettres de Requeste civile
- Advertissement In 't termineren vande differenten, staende te decideren tusschen Vrauwe Agnes de Hertoghe , doûagiere van I. Charles vander Borch, ende haere Kinderen, Heesschers by diversche Requesten ter eendre: ende Vrauw Barbara de la Forge, doûagiere van I. Jan Charles vander Borch, soo sy procedeert, Rescribente ter andere
- Een Kleyn Onderwys om het Jubileum Oprechtelijck te Verdienen

1662

- Joannes van der Elst, Den Ouden ende Nieuwen Grondt vande Musiicke
- (Augustinian College, Ghent), Des Autaers ter Jaerlycke Ghedenckenisse van het Miraculeus H. Bloedt inde Kercke vande PP. Augustynen binnen Ghendt
- Joannes Elincx, Catholycke Antwoorde Gheschreven op eenen Brief, van D. Isaac Snyers Predicant tot Middelborgh in Zeelandt, Waer in ghehandelt wordt, Eerst van het H. Sacrament des Autaers. 2. Van het Vaghevier. 3. Van den dienst der Beelden
- Officium de S. Barbara, Virgine & Martyre
- Kerchof-spel (a series of poems on the theme of churchyards, to congratulate Norbertus vande Kerchove on his installation as Abbot of Drongen Abbey)
- James Mumford, The Catholike Scripturist or The Plea of the Roman Catholikes Shewing the Scriptures to Hold Forth the Roman Faith

1663

- Petrus Dierkens (OP), Tractatus Brevis de Vita Contemplativa
- Franciscus a Puero Jesu (O.Carm.), Paradisus Animae sive Insignis de Virtutibus Tractatus
  - In Dutch as Uytnemende Godtvruchtich Boecxken Leerende hoemen alle verganckelicke dinghen sal versmaden
- John of the Cross, Gheestelycke Voorsichticheden Voor alle waerachtighe Religieusen en geestelicke zielen, translated by a Carmelite (Franciscus a Puero Jesu?)
- Gheestelicken Schat Vande Derde Ordre S. Dominici soo wel voor die Cloosterlijck, als voor die in haerlieder bysondere huysen in ootmoedige penitentie leven willen, translated by Philippus Aerts (OP)
- Catalogue ende vervolgh van alle de principaelste Reformateurs ofte Voor-Loopers des grooten Anti-Christ, die van Christus tijden tot het Jaer 1661 toe uyt den put des afgronts van tijdt tot tijdt opghekomen sijn
- Alexius De Lannoy, Onderwys Vande Weerdicheyt, Instellinge, Regels, Aflaeten ende Oeffeningen van 't devoot Aerts-Broederschap der Onbevlecte Ontfanghenisse Van Maria. Door de authoriteyt vanden Doorluchtichsten ende Eer-weerdichsten Heere Carolus Vanden Bosch Bisschop Van Ghendt, Ingestelt inde Kercke vande PP. Recollecten binnen Ghendt den 8. December 1663
- Oliverius à S. Anastasio, Dry Vermaeckelycke t'Samen-spraecken Tusschen het Italiaens ende Nederlandts Herderinneken Onder den Naem van Italica ende Belgica over de wonderlijcke Openbaeringhen ende seldtsaeme Wonderheden nu onlanghs gheschiedt in Italien door den H. Propheet Elias Patriarch der Carmeliten ende verkosen Patroon van Capua: Midtsgaders veel andere seldtsaeme gheschiedenissen ghebeurt in Spanien, Vranckrijck, Enghelandt, Nederlandt en ander Ghewesten des Wereldts

1664

- Franciscus Janssens Elinga, Authoritas Divi Thomae Aquinatis Quinti Ecclesiae Doctoris (a reply to Pedro de Alba y Astorga's Nodo Indissolubili)
- Alipius Reylof, Libri de anima ad mentem sancti Augustini
- Gheestelijcken Spieghel ofte Noodighe Kennisse Zijns Selfs
- Arnout Van Geluwe, Jaer-Ghetyde vanden Nieu Ghereformeerden Ont-Capten Capucyn, die Domine Hamerstede, Predicant van Maestricht, in 't jaer 1662
- Copye ghetrocken uyt eenen brief ghesonden uyt Franckfort , den 18 Mey 1664 waer in vermelt zyn twee wonderbare geschiedenissen, soo breeder hier in cont verstaen
- Laurens Vanden Hane (ed.), Vlaems Recht. Dat is, Costumen ende Wetten ghedecreteert by de Graven ende Gravinnen van Vlaenderen

1665

- Wouter De Costere, Reken-boecxken, om te leeren legghen met penninghen, seer profijtelijck voor de jonckheyt, ende een yeghelijcken. Midtsgaders de eerste fondamenten van arithmetica
- Caroli Van Hoorn Tractatus quadragesimalis
- Aflaeten voor het Godtvruchtigh Broederschap ofte Gulden van het H. Bloedt in-ghestelt ende onderhouden binnen Ghendt in 't Clooster vande PP. Augustijnen

1666

- Solemniteyten ende Ceremonien, waer mede Syne Excellentie Don Francisco de Moura y Cortereal, Marquis van Castel-Rodrigo, &c. Gouverneur ende Capitayn Generael vande Nederlanden ende Bourgoinien uyt den naem van Syne Conincklycke Maiesteyt Carel den II. sal doen ende ontfanghen den ghewoonelijcken Eedt vande Provincie van Vlaenderen binnen de Stede van Ghendt, op den 2. Mey 1666
- Cérémonies des Serments faits par le Marquis Castel-Rodrigo aux Etats de Flandres
- Antonius Ferdinandus Van Vlaenderen, Epigrammata Miscellanea
- Memorare Novissima

1667

- Franciscus à Puero Iesu (O.Carm.), Noodighe Onderwijsinghe voor alle Christen-Gheloovighen om het H. Sacrament der Penitentie ofte Biechte wel ende salichlijck te ghebruycken
- Petrus Dierkens (OP), Tractatus Brevis de Obligationibus Regulae et Constitutionum
- Inde Saecke van Mr Jan de Coninck, Advocaet van desen Hove, ende d'Heer Adriaen van Hulthem
- Tractaet van de alliancie tusschen de coninghen van Vranckrijck ende Portugal, jeghens de coninck van Spagnien, ghesloten den lesten Meert 1667, binnen Lisbon
- Declaratie van de rechten op de graenen ende zaet wt Vranckrijck
- Verkoopinghe van boecken waervan de Catalogue te bekomen is by Max. Graet, 15 oct. 1667

1668

- (Augustinian College, Ghent), De Ghecroonde Memorie des Doodts inden Heylighen Henricus. De Verloste Onnooselheyt inde Heylighe Chunegundes Zijn Huysvrauwe. Speel-wijs vertoont
- Bonifacius Maes, Mysticke Theologie Ofte verborghen Godts-Gheleertheyt (2nd edition)
- Francisco Janssens Elinga (ed.), Summa conciliorum a Bartholomæo Carranza collecta recognita
- Translaet van de Sententie Ghegheven inden Priveen Raedt van Zijne Majesteyt, op den twee-en-twintichsten December 1668. Nopende de Imposten ofte Accysen binnen der Stede van Ghendt
- Den Eedt Ghepresteert by de Brauwers der Stede van Ghendt

1669

- Oordeel vande Doctoren inde H. Godtheyt der Universiteyt van Loven raeckende de Nootsaekelijcheyt vande Liefde tot het Waerachtigh Berauw der Sonden. Versocht ende verkreghen door de Eerweerdighe Heeren Pastoors der Stede van Ghendt
- Motif van Rechte om Jo. Gerom Borluut Heere van S. Denys Boucle, Wostyne, Havaert, van Buysere, &c. Ghedaeghden op groote Revisie, jeghens Oratio Brias Capiteyn ghereformeert
- Sententie Ghegeven binnen de Stede van Ghendt (sentence passed on 9 November 1669 upon Jan Lacksweert, baker, for murdering his wife)

1670

- Groot en langh-ghewenschte dry-hondert-iaerich Jubilé van het wijdt-vermaert Alder-heylighste Sacrament van Mirakel, rustende inde Kercke vande HH. Michaël ende Gudula binnen Brussel. Naer de copie van Brussel
- Motif van Rechten (memorial concerning the validity of a noble inheritance)
- Peter Talbot, A Treatise of Religion and Government; with Reflections upon the Cause and Cure of Englands Late Distempers and Present Dangers

1671

- Petrus Dierkens (OP), Exercitia Spiritualia Desumpta Ex Tota Theologia Mystica

1672

- Ordonnance et Edict Perpetuel des Archidves Nos Princes Souverains [...] Ordinancie ende Eeuwich Edict vande Erts-Hertoghen Onse Souvereyne Princen tot beter directie vande saken van Justicie (a new Dutch translation of the Perpetual Edict of 1611)

1673

- Regula S. Augustini Episcopi et Constitutiones Fratrum Ordinis Prædicatorum
- (Augustinian College, Ghent), Boosheyt rechtveerdighlijck ghestraft in Gerardus hertogh van Britannien (a school play performed in September 1673)

1674

- Johan Karel Vrints van Trouwenfeldt, Het Leven van de Heylighe Pharahildis
- Lijcx Oratie van Z. Hoogw. onse Bisschop Eugenius Albertus d'Allamont, den 21 Januarij 1674, door den Seer Eerw. P. d'Aubermont, predikheer
- Jan Anthone Knobbaert, Korte Redenen voor-ghehouden aen Hooge en Mogende Heeren Myn Heeren vanden Raede in Vlaenderen. Tot Betoogh dat volgens de Costume van Ghendt bestandigh can wesen eene Ghifte inter vivos, van eene onbesette Rente
- Jan Anthone Knobbaert, Resultat uyt het Wederlegh vande Korte Redenen voorghehouden aen Hooghe ende Moghende Heeren Myn Heeren Vanden Raede in Vlaendren tot Betoogh dat volgens de Costume van Ghendt bestandigh can wesen eene Ghifte inter vivos

1675

- Libertas Honestae Piaeque Liberalitatis Excusso Fraeno Donationum Asserta a Ioanne Antonio Knobbaert Advocato Concilii Flandriæ. Pro instructione Caussae, pendentis coram Nobilibus, Amplissimis, & Praepotentibus Dominis, D. D. praefatum Concilium Flandriae Constituentibus, inter R. P. Rectorem Collegii Societatis Iesu Gandensis Appellantem, Scabinos secundi Subselii ejusdem Civitatis Appellatos, & Margeretam Heyse & Consortes intimatos
- Lyste Vande Verpachtinge Vande Balancen Ende Graen-Maeten Zyne Majesteyt competerende inden Lande van Waes
- Verkoopinghe van boecken, op den 8 Julij 1675, ten huyse van Jacobus Vander Haeghen
- Tweede verkoopinghe van boecken , op den 20 Julij 1675, ten huyse van Jac. Vander Haeghen

1676

- Gilles Carlier (SJ), Kruys van Diamanten ofte Onweerderelicken Schat Ghesocht ende ghevonden in het Christelyck Lyden

=== Almanacs ===
Besides a weekly newspaper, Graet also published different series of yearly almanacs, a number of issues from which survive.

Willem Crabben's almanacs on the meridian of Cologne, Duytschen waersegger, for 1657, and 1666.

Jan van Wareghem's almanacs on the meridian of Ghent, Nederlandtschen sterre-kycker, for 1663, 1664, 1665, 1667, 1668, 1669, 1670, 1673, 1675.

Single-sheet wall calendars from 1671, 1673.
