= List of newspapers in Tuvalu =

This is a list of newspapers that have been published in Tuvalu.

- Tuvalu Newsheet published in Tuvaluan by the Broadcasting and Information Office (BIO) of Tuvalu from 1975 to 1983.
- Sikuleo o Tuvalu, (replacing the Tuvalu Newsheet) a government news sheet published in Tuvaluan by the BIO and subsequently by the state-owned Tuvalu Media Corporation from 1983 to 2007.
- Tuvalu Echoes, a fortnightly newspaper published from 1983 by the BIO and subsequently by the Tuvalu Media Corporation. Publication was in English and Tuvaluan with the newspaper in an A4 sized format. The newspaper published articles about government activities, international news and news about Tuvaluan events and celebrations. It ceased publication due to lack of funding in the mid 1990s. Publishing resumed in 1998 with assistance from the Australian Agency for International Development (AUSAID). Publication was hampered by the printer breaking down and lack of paper and ink. In 2002 Tuvalu Echoes had a circulation of 250. The newspaper closed down in 2007.
- Tala o Matagi (Story of the Wind) weekly newspaper was established in 2011 by Enele Sopoaga, the leader of the opposition in Parliament, with the intention of printing 100~200 copies of a few pages written in both English and Tuvaluan.
- Fenui – news from Tuvalu is a free digital publication of the Government of Tuvalu media department that is emailed to subscribers and operates a Facebook page, which publishes news about government activities and news about Tuvaluan events, such as a special edition covering the results of the 2015 general election.
- Tuvalu Paradise News, the first private newspaper to operate in the country, was published and edited by the Rev. Dr. Kitiona Tausi from 28 September 2020 until the appointment of Tausi as a member of parliament in July 2022.
- Island of Hope commenced publication in February 2024 as a newsletter, by the Rev. Dr. Kitiona Tausi.

== See also ==
- List of newspapers
