= List of newspapers in Curaçao =

This is a list of newspapers currently published in Curaçao, grouped by language.

== Multiple Languages ==
Official

- Government News in Dutch and Papiamentu

Daily

- Extra – Papamientu and English

Websites

- Deporte Awe – Papiamentu, English and Spanish

== Papiamentu ==
Daily

- Vigilante

Websites

- Bohimio

== Dutch ==
Daily

- Amigoe – published throughout the ABC islands
- Antilliaans Dagblad

Websites

- Curacao.nu
- Knipselkrant Curaçao

== English ==
Websites

- Curaçao Chronicle
- The Daily Herald (St Maarten newspaper with lots of coverage on Curaçao)

== Spanish ==
Websites

- Noticias Curazao

== See also ==
- List of newspapers
