= 2023 Niue National Awards =

The 2023 Niue National Awards were awards made under the Niue National Awards system to recognise achievement and service by Niueans. They were announced on 19 October 2023.

The recipients of honours are displayed here as they were styled before their new honour.

== Niue Public Service Medal (NPSM) ==
- Taumalua Jackson
- Tifaole Ioane

== Niue Community Service Star (NCSS) ==
- Talakaima Sakaki Sauni
- Fouasosa Tohovaka
- Michael Jackson
