= 2013 Tanna by-election =

- 27 May 2013
Candidate	Pascal Iauko	Moses Kahu	Sapi Natonga
Party	Iauko	Vanua'aku Pati	NCAP
Popular vote	4,017	2,676	2,314
Percentage	32.06%	21.36%	18.47%

A by-election was held in the Tanna constituency in Vanuatu on 27 May 2013. It followed the death of incumbent MP Harry Iauko, who was also the Minister for Infrastructure, Public Utilities and Public Service.

== Context ==
Tanna is a multiseat constituency, electing seven representatives to the national Parliament in each general election. It is a rural constituency; Vanuatu as a whole has only two towns (Port Vila and Luganville), neither of which is located on this island.

In the October 2012 general election, Harry Iauko, an incumbent minister in Prime Minister Sato Kilman's government, had retained the seat comfortably, coming second with 1,054 votes, behind Union of Moderate Parties candidate Silas Yatan (1,067) and just ahead of independent candidate Richard Namel (922). The lowest placed of the seven elected candidates was Joe Natuman (Vanua'aku Party), with 764 votes, partly because his party had fielded several candidates. Iauko himself stood as the candidate and leader of the "Iauko Group", a dissident movement which had broken away from the Vanua'aku Party. Such party splits have been a frequent occurrence in Vanuatu. Iauko thus remained popular on Tanna, despite being a controversial figure. In 2008, he had been accused of corruption over the sale of public lands, but had not been charged. In 2011, he had been convicted of aiding and abetting damage to property and aiding and abetting intentional assault, for having supervised the beating up of a journalist who had criticised him. Upon his conviction, he had been sentenced to a fine, and Prime Minister Kilman had rejected calls to sack him. Later that same year, the president of Transparency International Vanuatu accused him of having come to TIV's headquarters, "threatening to throw staff out the window and burn their building down", after TIV had published several accusations of corruption against him.

On 10 December 2012, he was taken suddenly ill while in a hotel in Luganville, and was rushed to hospital, where he was pronounced dead a short while later. The by-election for his seat in Parliament was set for May 27. In the meantime, however, the Kilman government lost its parliamentary majority, following defections, and was forced to resign. Green Confederation MP Moana Carcasses Kalosil formed a new coalition government on 23 March. The Iauko Group MPs sat on the Opposition benches.

== Candidates ==
The Opposition coalition was mostly united in the by-election. Its various parties tacitly endorsed Iauko's son Pascal Iauko, "a complete unknown in Vanuatu politics", described as having a "quiet demeanour", who turned 27 eleven days before the election. Pascal Iauko was also endorsed by local elders, in accordance with a tradition of leadership being entrusted in a relative of the deceased leader. By contrast, the main parties of Carcasses' coalition government stood candidates against one another. Moses Kahu, who had sat as an MP for Tanna from 2004 to 2012, stood as the candidate of the Vanua'aku Party, the country's oldest political party, led by Deputy Prime Minister Edward Natapei. Another major government party, the Union of Moderate Parties, stood Jacques Mariango - who faced the challenge of a dissident UMP candidate, Jimmy Iawar Iauia. Local businessman Sapi Natonga stood as the candidate of his own National Community Association Party, while independent candidate Kassu Amos Naung rounded off the field.

== Results ==
The election was a milestone in Vanuatu politics. At the age of just 27, Pascal Iauko was elected in a landslide, with the highest tally of votes in any parliamentary election since the country's independence in 1980. He also secured a very large lead over his closest opponent - more than 1,300 votes. On a day marked by heavy rain, turnout was 52%, considered low by Vanuatu standards.

Iauko sat initially on the Opposition benches, with the other Iauko Group MPs, under the leadership of Tony Nari. In October 2013, however, the Group merged back into the Vanua'aku Party, and joined Prime Minister Carcasses' parliamentary majority. From then on, the Iauko Group no longer existed, and Pascal Iauko sat as a Vanua'aku Party government backbencher.

Candidate	Party	Votes	%
Pascal Iauko	Iauko Group	4,017	32.06
Moses Kahu	Vanua'aku Pati	2,676	21.36
Sapi Natonga	National Community Association	2,314	18.47
Jimmy Iawar Iauia	Tafea Moderates Alliance Party	1,806	14.41
Jacques Meriago Nauka	Union of Moderate Parties	1,671	13.34
Kassu Amos Naung	Independent	45	0.36
Total		12,529	100.00
Valid votes		12,529	96.53
Invalid/blank votes		451	3.47
Total votes		12,980	100.00
Registered voters/turnout		25,381	51.14
