= List of newspapers in Vatican City =

Below is a list of newspapers published in Vatican City.

- L'Osservatore Romano
- Donne Chiesa Mondo
- Vatican Information Service
- Vatican News (online only)

== News agencies ==
- Agenzia Fides

== See also ==
- Lists of newspapers
- Index of Vatican City-related articles
