= List of newspapers in Samoa =

This is a list of newspapers in Samoa.

- Savali
- Le Samoa
- Samoa Observer
- Samoa Times
- Samoanische Zeitung
- Talamua Magazine
- Samoa Times and South Sea Advertiser

== See also ==
- List of newspapers
