= Harry Iauko =

Ni-Vanuatu politician

Harry Iaris Iauko (died 10 December 2012) was a Ni-Vanuatu politician. He was a Member of Parliament for Tanna, representing the Vanua'aku Pati, from 2008 until his death.

== Political career ==
=== Secretary-General of the Vanua'aku Pati ===
In 2005, he was appointed Secretary-General of the Vanua'aku Pati. He had been described as "the architect of the re-election of (Edward) Natapei" to the party's leadership. The Contemporary Pacific alleged that Iauko had "made a number of promises to various people in return for votes".

In 2008, Vanuatu's Ombudsman recommended that criminal charges be brought against him concerning the sale of public land at Fatumaru Bay. The Ombudsman stated that Iauko might have been bribed.

=== Member of Parliament ===
Following the 2008 general election, he was a Member of Parliament for Tanna, representing the Vanua'aku Pati.

In November 2008, Prime Minister Edward Natapei suspended him from the Vanua'aku Pati for signing a failed motion of no confidence against him. In June 2009, however, Iauko was appointed Minister for Lands in Natapei's Cabinet.

A few days after his appointment, he unsuccessfully demanded the resignation of Opposition MP Ralph Regenvanu, who had accused him of being "corrupt".

In May 2010, claiming that he had been elected president of the Vanua'aku Pati -a claim which Natapei contested-, he joined the opposition to Natapei's government, and was appointed deputy Opposition leader.

=== Minister for Infrastructure and Public Utilities ===
In December, when Natapei was ousted in a vote of no confidence and replaced as prime minister by Sato Kilman, Iauko was appointed Minister for Infrastructure and Public Utilities.

=== Alleged assault of journalists, corruption ===
On 4 March 2011, the Vanuatu Daily Post accused him of having led a group of "thugs" into the newspaper's offices, arriving in a government-registered vehicle. The Daily Post reported that Iauko threatened to "break [the] face" of editor Royson Willie, and stood by and watched while his "thugs" strangled and kicked publisher Marc Neil-Jones. This followed a series of articles which the newspaper had published criticising several of Iauko's actions as minister. Neil-Jones said he would press charges against Iauko "on several counts including aiding and abetting an assault". The Daily Post on 5 March headlined "Iauko brings disgrace to Kilman government", describing Iauko's actions, and also published again a list of several acts of "alleged corrupt land dealings" which the minister had been involved in.

Iauko later gave his side of the story to The Independent, saying he had indeed confronted Neil-Jones on the premises of the Daily Post, because he had "had enough" of that newspaper's "unfair and unbalanced" reporting. "I said: 'Marc, I know you are all about making money, selling news, and all I want is my side of the events told.' [...] Then, while I was talking, one of my boys just walked past me, grabbed his head and put it on the table, then the other grabbed his head and put it on the table and I said, 'Enough', and we walked out." Iauko denied that Neil-Jones had been strangled, kicked or pushed to the ground, and denied that he had brought more than three men with him into Neil-Jones' office - a claim which Neil-Jones said was contradicted by photographs taken by the Daily Post staff.

Three weeks after the events, police arrested four suspects, whose names were not immediately revealed. Neil-Jones said the police had told him Iauko, who was "currently undergoing medical treatment in Australia", was "likely to be charged on his return". In early April, it was reported he would appear in court, on charges of "inciting and abetting assault and unlawful assembly", and that "the government of Sato Kilman continue[d] to face criticism for not taking any action to discipline its Minister over the alleged assault which ha[d] prompted outrage among regional media organisations and strong statements from various foreign diplomats". The government stated it would wait for the court's ruling before deciding on whether to expel Iauko from government.

On 6 April, Iauko failed to appear in court for a first hearing.

The issue of his potential suspension from government, however, soon became moot, as the Kilman government was narrowly ousted in a parliamentary motion of no confidence on 24 April, and Iauko lost his government position along with every other minister. The matter was revived three weeks later, on 13 May, when the Court of Appeal voided the election of Serge Vohor's new government on constitutional grounds, and the Kilman government was restored. This lasted for only a month; on 16 June, the Kilman premiership was itself voided on constitutional grounds by the Supreme Court's Chief Justice Vincent Lunabek, and Iauko lost office once more. He regained it on 26 June when Kilman was restored as prime minister by Parliament, and reinstated his Cabinet.

=== Conviction ===
After an adjournment of the case at the request of the defence, it was reported that Iauko would appear in court on 10 June, on charges of unlawful assembly, trespass, intentional assault and threatening. On 30 June, having pled guilty to aiding and abetting damage to property and aiding and abetting intentional assault, he was fined Vt15,000. The other charges were withdrawn by the prosecution. Reporters Without Borders denounced the fine as "risible", saying it was "not commensurate with the gravity of the crime", and that such a small fine for an assault on a journalist risked pushing other journalists to censor themselves rather than criticise politicians.

In late 2011, Transparency International Vanuatu published an article "detailing corrupt practices in which Mr Iauko was allegedly involved". TIV president Marie-Noelle Ferrieux-Patterson told the press that Iauko had responded by coming to Transparency International's office "threatening to throw staff out the window and burn their building down".

=== 2012 general election ===
As dissidents from the Vanua'aku Pati, he and his supporters stood as candidates of the Iauko Group in the October 2012 general election. He retained his seat in Parliament; the Iauko Group obtained three seats in all, and renewed its support for the Kilman coalition government. Iauko retained his position in government, as Minister for Infrastructure, Public Utilities and Public Service.

=== Other activities ===
Iauko was a former chairman of the board of management of Air Vanuatu. He was removed from the position by Minister of Public Utilities Serge Vohor in 2009. In April 2012, Prime Minister Sato Kilman gave Iauko ministerial responsibility for Air Vanuatu.

== Death and legacy ==
On 10 December 2012, he was taken suddenly ill while in a hotel in Luganville, and was rushed to hospital, where he was pronounced dead a short while later. The cause of death was not immediately made public.

His death led to a by-election for his Tanna seat in Parliament. The by-election was won comfortably by his son Pascal Sebastien Iauko, "a complete unknown in Vanuatu politics" at the age of 27, who stood as the candidate of the Iauko group and is thought to have benefited from his father's continued popularity in the constituency.
