= List of newspapers in Chad =

This is an incomplete list of newspapers published in Chad.

== Newspapers ==
- Abba Garde
- Alwihda
- Cloche, monthly
- Da'kouna, monthly
- Info-Tchad, weekly
- La Marche
- Le Messager du Moyen-Chari
- Le Miroir, bi-monthly
- Le Sahel
- Le Visionnaire
- N’Djamena al-Djadida
- N'Djamena Bi-Hebdo, bi-weekly
- N'Djamena Hebdo, est. 1989; weekly
- Notre Temps, est. 2000; weekly
- L'Observateur, est. 1997; weekly
- Le Progrès, est. 1993; daily, government-subsidized
- RAFIGUI Presse Jeunes
- Sarh Tribune
- Sud Echos, weekly
- Tchad et Culture, est. 1961; monthly
- Le Temps, est. 1995; weekly

== See also ==
- Media of Chad
- Telecommunications in Chad

== Bibliography ==
- "Chad: Directory: the Press". Africa South of the Sahara 2004. Regional Surveys of the World. Europa Publications. 2004. p. 236+. ISBN 1857431839.
- "Chad", Freedom of the Press, USA: Freedom House, 2015, OCLC 57509361
