= Belgian National Movement =

Belgian National Movement Mouvement National Belge Belgisch Nationale Beweging
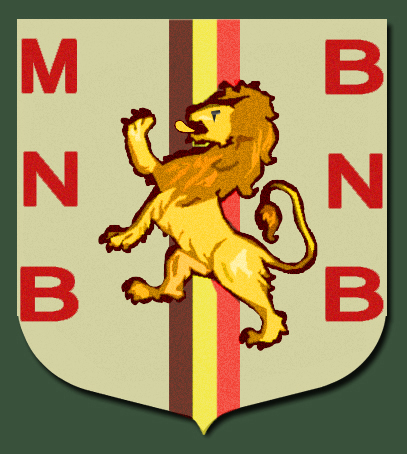
- Leaders: Aimé Dandoy; Camille Joset
- Dates active: December 1940-September 1944
- Headquarters: Brussels
- Ideology: Centre-right; Liberal or Catholic
- Size: 15,200 (total)
- Wars: the Belgian Resistance (World War II)

The Belgian National Movement (French: Mouvement national belge or MNB, Dutch: Belgisch Nationale Beweging, BNB) was a major group in the resistance in German-occupied Belgium during World War II with politically centre-right leanings.

The MNB was founded in Brussels in December 1940 by Aimé Dandoy. It focused on evacuating Allied airmen, sabotage and intelligence gathering. Most of its members were recruited from the French-speaking middle classes associated with the pre-war Catholic Block, and maintained a centre-right political stance which was more moderate than the powerful Belgian Legion group (later the Secret Army).

The group ran the "Mill" intelligence network and was also active with the "Comet" Escape Line. It was also active in publishing a clandestine newspaper, La Voix des Belges. In September 1942, the group signed an agreement with the large left-wing Front de l'Indépendance group in order to co-ordinate their operations, however the groups were mutually suspicious and shared very different political ideologies which reduced their scope for greater collaboration. Its relations with the Belgian government in London were closer than for many other groups who saw it with suspicion.

In February 1944, most of the leaders of the group were arrested by German forces, effectively halting almost all the activities of the group, though the newspaper continued to be published until the liberation of Belgium in September 1944.
