= Pascal Iauko =

Vanuatuan politician (born 1986)

Harry Pascal Sebastien Iauko MP

Member of Parliament for Tanna
- In office 27 May 2013 – 22 October 2015
- Preceded by: Harry Iauko
- Succeeded by: to be determined
- Majority: 10.7 %

Personal details
- Born: 16 May 1986 (age 39)
- Party: Iauko Group (until October 2013); Vanua'aku Pati (from October 2013)

Harry Pascal Sebastien Iauko, born 16 May 1986, is a Vanuatuan politician.

== Career ==
He entered politics at an unexpectedly young age, following the death of his father Harry Iauko, MP for Tanna and Minister for Infrastructure, Public Utilities and Public Service in Prime Minister Sato Kilman's government, on 10 December 2012. Harry Iauko's death led to a by-election for his seat in Parliament. By the time the election was held on May 27, the Kilman government had lost its majority in Parliament and resigned; Moana Carcasses (of the Green Confederation) was the new Prime Minister, leading a broad coalition government. In the by-election, Pascal Iauko stood as the candidate of the Iauko Group, a small political movement which had been headed by his father, after his break-away from the Vanua'aku Pati. Parties within the Opposition coalition tacitly endorsed him and did not stand against him, while the main parties within the coalition government each stood a candidate. Thus, "the seat was contested by almost a united opposition against a divided government side". Iauko's youth and "quiet demeanour" were commented upon, but he was also endorsed by local elders.

His father, despite having been a highly controversial figure, convicted in 2011 for aiding and abetting intentional assault (having supervised the beating up of a journalist who had criticised him), had remained popular on Tanna, where there remained a strong tradition of handing on leadership positions to family members of deceased leaders. Pascal Iauko, at the age of just 27, was elected in a landslide victory, with the largest vote tally in the country's history. He secured 4,017 votes, a record, corresponding to 32% of the vote, with a record lead of 1,341 votes (10.7%) over his closest opponent, and joined the Opposition benches.

In October 2013, the Iauko Group, under the leadership of Tony Nari, merged back into the Vanua'aku Pati, and joined Prime Minister Carcasses' parliamentary majority. From then on, Pascal Iauko sat as a Vanua'aku Pati government backbencher.

== Conviction ==
On 22 October 2015, he was found guilty of bribery, was sentenced to three years in prison, and lost his seat in Parliament.
