= List of newspapers in Gibraltar =

This is a list of newspapers currently published in Gibraltar.

== Daily ==
- Gibraltar Chronicle
- Panorama
- The New People – online edition

== Magazines ==
- Gibraltar International – business quarterly
- Gibraltar Magazine – monthly
- Globe Magazine – e-edition
- Insight – monthly
- Upon This Rock – monthly

== Official ==
- Press Office, HM Government of Gibraltar

== News websites ==
- Your Gibraltar TV (YGTV) News

== See also ==
- List of newspapers
