= List of newspapers in San Marino =

Below is a list of newspapers published in San Marino.

== Current newspapers ==
=== Sammarinese newspapers ===
- L'Informazione di San Marino – daily newspaper
- Lo Sportivo.sm
- La Serenissima – daily newspaper
- Libertas – online newspaper
- Repubblica.sm – daily newspaper
- San Marino Fixing – weekly and online newspaper
- San Marino RTV – online newspaper

=== Italian newspapers with Sammarinese sections ===
- Il Resto del Carlino

== Former newspapers ==
- Il Popolo Sammarinese – newspaper of Sammarinese Fascist Party
- La Tribuna Sammarinese (1995–2017)
- La Voce di Romagna

== See also ==
- List of newspapers
