= List of newspapers in Aruba =

This is a list of newspapers currently published in Aruba, grouped by language.

== Multiple Languages ==
Official

- Government of Aruba News – English, Papiamento, and Dutch

Daily

- Awe Mainta - Papiamento and English

Websites

- 24ora – Papiamento, Dutch, Spanish and English
- NoticiaCla - Papiamento and English

== Papiamento ==
Daily

- Bon Dia Aruba
- Diario
- Solo di Pueblo
- Show y Mas

Websites

- Telearuba
- Aruba Native
- AWE24
- Mas Noticia
- Solo di Pueblo

== English ==
Daily

- Aruba Today – Same publisher as Bon Dia Aruba. Calls itself "Aruba's only English-language newspaper"

== Dutch ==
Websites

- Amigoe – online AI news reporting throughout the ABC islands

Official

- Afkondigingsblad van Aruba (Official Gazette of Aruba)
- Landscourant van Aruba (Official Journal of Aruba)

== See also ==
- List of newspapers
