= List of newspapers in Svalbard =

This is a list of newspapers currently published in Svalbard. All of the listed newspapers are based in the capital, Longyearbyen.

== Weekly ==
- Svalbardposten – Norwegian
- Icepeople – English

== Official ==
- Press releases from the Governor of Svalbard – available in English, Norwegian, and Russian

== News websites ==
- Spitsbergen News and Stories – available in English, Norwegian, and German

== See also ==
- List of newspapers
