= The Mongol Messenger =

First English language newspaper published from Mongolia

- Type: Weekly newspaper
- Owner: Montsame
- Language: English
- Website: montsame.mn/en

The Mongol Messenger is the first English-language newspaper published from Mongolia. It was launched by the Mongolian news agency Montsame. It is a government owned newspaper.
