= Honduras This Week =

Honduran newspaper

- Type: Weekly newspaper
- Editor-in-chief: Mario Gutierrez Minera
- Founded: 1992
- Language: English language
- Ceased publication: 2006
- Headquarters: Tegucigalpa
- Website: www.hondurasthisweek.com

Honduras This Week (HTW) was a weekly newspaper published from Tegucigalpa, Honduras. It was edited by Mario Gutierrez Minera. The publisher was Stan Marrder. It operated as Tegucigalpa This Week in 1988–1989 and had an online version, Honduras This Week Online, from 1995 to 2013. Journalists who wrote for the paper include W. E. Gutman, Lynn Chotowetz, Melanie Wetzel and Blanca Moreno.

Archives that have digital copies of original issues include University of Florida, George A. Smathers Library (2009) and the Internet Archive, Wayback Machine.
