= List of newspapers in the Central African Republic =

This is an incomplete list of newspapers published in the Central African Republic.

== Newspapers ==
- Be Afrika
- Centrafrique Presse
- Le Citoyen
- Le Confident
- Le Democrate
- E Le Songo
- Echo de Centrafrique
- La Fraternité
