= The Island Sun (Solomon Islands) =

Newspaper in Solomon Islands

- Type: Daily newspaper
- Publisher: Island Sun Newspaper Limited
- Founded: 6 October 2006; 19 years ago

The Island Sun is a Solomon Islands daily, privately owned English language newspaper, founded in October 2006 by Island Sun Newspaper Limited.

Prime Minister Derek Sikua sued the paper for defamation in May 2009 after publishing an article where he and Secretary to Cabinet Jeremiah Manele were drunk after the previous year's United Nations General Assembly in New York.

It was known in September 2011 that the paper published a four-page article labelling Namson Tran as a criminal.

Since 2019, the newspaper started posting articles favourable to China after establishing diplomatic ties with the country, which led to Chinese-influenced reporting regarding Taiwan. Chinese financial support of the newspaper appears to have begun in 2022. It was revealed that its editor Lloyd Loji received talks from Chinese diplomat Huagbi Lin in January 2024 after publishing an article on the election of Lai Ching-te and what it meant for the PRC. The diplomat told Loji that the paper should be aligned to Beijing's interests, abiding to the One China Policy.

== Editors ==
- 2006-unknown year: Priestley Habru
- unknown year-present: Lloyd Loji
