= List of newspapers in Eswatini =

Below is list of newspapers published in Eswatini:

- Eswatini Observer — www.eswatiniobserver.com
- Times of Eswatini — www.times.co.sz
- Swazi24 — www.swazi24.com
- Eswatini Daily News — www.swazidailynews.com
- Eswatini Financial Times — www.eswatinifinancialtimes.africa

== See also ==
- Eswatini Broadcasting and Information Service
