= List of newspapers in Jersey =

This article is a list of newspapers in Jersey.

- Jersey Evening Post

== Defunct newspapers ==
This is a partial list of some of the more notable and long-lived Jersey newspapers.

- Le Magasin de Jersey (1784-1785) - first newspaper published in Jersey
- La Gazette de Jersey (1786-1797)
- Le Soleil de Jersey (1792-1798)
- Gazette de l'Île de Jersey (1797-1814)
- La Gazette de Césarée (1809-1820)
- La Chronique de Jersey (1814-1917)
- Le Constitutionnel (1820-1876)
- The British Press (1822-1823) - first English language newspaper published in Jersey
- The British Press and Jersey Times (1823-1910) - amalgamated with The British Press
- La Patrie (1849-1855) - produced by Robert Pipon Marett
- L'Homme (1853-1855) - produced by Victor Hugo in exile with the proscrits
- La Nouvelle Chronique de Jersey (1855-1917)
- Jersey Independent (1855-1910)
- La Lanterne Magique (1868-1873)
- La Voix des Îles (1873-1874)
- The Morning News (1909-1949) - suspended during the German Occupation
- Deutsche Inselzeitung (1940-1945) - German language newspaper for occupying troops
- Les Chroniques de Jersey (1917-1959) - amalgamation of La Chronique de Jersey and La Nouvelle Chronique de Jersey
- The Island Eye (1990-1991)
- Channel Island Sunday Times (1991)
