= List of newspapers in Saint Lucia =

Map of Saint Lucia

There are currently seven newspapers published in print or online in Saint Lucia.

Current newspapers:

- Caribbean News NowCaribbean News Now covers the major events that are happening on the Caribbean Islands. Caribbean News Now provides their own Facebook page, for the islanders and world to stay up to date through Facebook sharing pictures and links to news information sources. The website also provides the COVID-19 statistics for each country and the numbers of people who have it, how many have recovered, and the number of deaths from the virus. Current travel information is provided for tourists and locals that live there, and the type of precautions they are taking for the safety of travelers and the locals who work in high volume tourist areas being provided a vaccination as a first priority[1]

There is a news menu bar provided with information on sources about region, world, health, education, entertainment &lifestyle, citizenship & migration, politics. An opinion and letters tab is available to click on to see what people have written to the news editor. A Features page is provided and so is an announcement page.

- OneLucian News, founded in 2001
- The St Lucia Mirror
- St. Lucia Times, website, started on March 31, 2014, by parent company Big Feat Media
- St. Lucia News Online, officially launched on Oct. 1, 2012., Gros Islet, website
- The Star, established in 1987, published weekly (Saturday), founded by Mae and Rick Wayne
- The Voice of Saint Lucia, The Voice (1885– ), Castries, British Library 013895624

Based on records in the British Archives, the following newspapers were published in Saint Lucia:

- The Independent Press (1843–1844), British Library 013918567
- The Observer (1874), British Library 013895622
- Saint Lucia Herald (1962–1965), British Library 016246251
- Saint Lucia Observer (1874–1876), Castries, British Library 013895621
- The Palladium, and Saint Lucia Free Press (1839 to 1840), British Library 013895620
