= BruDirect =

- Type: Daily newspaper
- Format: Online
- Owner(s): Ignatius Stephen
- Founded: 1999
- Language: Malay, English
- Website: brudirect.com

BruDirect is a daily online Brunei newspaper, established in 1999. The newspaper was founded by the Brunei journalist Ignatius Stephen and is published in both the Malay and English languages.
