= Opron Star =

Opron Star was an irregular, mimeographed newspaper published from Tabernacle, Saint Kitts and Nevis. Opron Star began publication as a bimonthly in 1981. It profiled itself as a 'political sheet for intellectuals'. Opron Star was the organ of the Organization of Progressive Nationals (OPRON).
