= List of newspapers in the Cayman Islands =

The Cayman Islands is a group of three islands in the Caribbean Sea. The first monthly publication on the islands was The Gospel of the Kingdom, a religious themed newspaper founded in 1945. In 1964, the newspaper Tradewinds began publication. This was joined by the rival Caymanian Weekly in 1965. This was followed by a second weekly publication, the Cayman Compass, which started in 1972. In 1974, the two weeklies merged to form the Caymanian Compass. This became a bi-weekly publication in 1976, appearing on Tuesdays and Fridays.

Other newspapers that have appeared on the islands are the Cayman Times (1979–1982), Caymanian Pilot (1984) and the New Cameranian (1990–1992).

The following newspapers feature Cayman Islands news:

- Cayman Compass (available in a weekly newspaper or on )
- Cayman News Service (online news website on )
- Cayman Independent (available in a weekly newspaper on )
- The Caymanian Journal (available in a weekly newspaper on )
- Cayman Islands Gazette, the official government publication
- Cayman Marl Road (online news website on )
