= Ghendtsche Post-Tydinghen =

Newspaper

- Edition of 8 September 1667
- Founded: 1667
- Ceased publication: 1722
- Language: Dutch
- City: Ghent
- Country: Southern Netherlands

The Ghendtsche Post-Tydinghen (lit. 'Ghentish Post Newspaper') was initially a weekly (and later a twice-weekly) newspaper published in Ghent from 1667 to 1722.

== Publication history ==
The newspaper was founded by Maximiliaan Graet, printer to the city of Ghent, in 1667, and remained a family business, run by his widow and their descendants, until it folded in 1722.
