= Le Communiste =

French language newspaper in Belgium

- Type: Weekly
- Founded: 1928
- Political alignment: Communist
- Language: French language
- Headquarters: Brussels
- Sister newspapers: De Kommunist

Le Communiste (French pronunciation: [lə kɔmynist], 'The Communist') was a French language weekly newspaper published from Brussels, Belgium. It was founded in 1928 by the group of War Van Overstraeten, which had been expelled from the Communist Party of Belgium.
