= The Montserrat Reporter =

- Type: Weekly newspaper
- Owner(s): Montserrat Printing & Publishing Inc.
- Publisher: Bennette Roach
- Language: English
- Headquarters: Davy Hill, Montserrat
- Country: Montserrat
- Website: themontserratreporter.com

The Montserrat Reporter is the only newspaper published in Montserrat. The paper is published on a weekly basis and is owned by Montserrat Printing & Publishing Inc.
