= Labour Spokesman =

Newspaper

- Type: Twice a week Newspaper
- Founded: 1957
- Political alignment: Saint Kitts and Nevis Labour Party
- Language: English
- Headquarters: Masses House, Church Street, Basseterre
- City: Basseterre
- Country: Saint Kitts and Nevis
- Circulation: 6,000 (as of 2002)
- Website: thelabourspokesman.com

Labour Spokesman is a newspaper published from Basseterre, Saint Kitts and Nevis. It was founded in 1957. As of 1972, it was published as a daily and claimed a circulation of 1,500. At the time, George Lewis was the editor. It is an organ of the Saint Kitts and Nevis Labour Party and the Saint Kitts and Nevis Trades and Labour Union. At the time, it was the sole daily newspaper in the country. The newspaper frequently published allegations of corruption in the rival People's Action Movement.

== History ==
As of the 1980s, Joseph France served as editor of Labour Spokesman, whilst serving as secretary of the Labour Party and general secretary of the Trades and Labour Union at the same time. At the time, the newspaper had one full-time reporter and a part-time reporter. The newspaper is mainly dedicated to local issues.

As of the mid-1980s, it was published on Wednesdays and Saturdays. By the early 1990s, Dawud Byron served as editor of Labour Spokesman and Walford Gumbs as its manager. An 8-page tabloid, copies of Labour Spokesman were sold for 0.75 East Caribbean dollar (ECD). In 2002, it claimed a circulation of around 6,000. As of 2007, it was reportedly still published twice weekly. As of 2002, the 8-page Wednesday issues were sold for 1 ECD, whilst the 20-page Saturday issues were sold for 2 ECD.

The offices and printing press of Labour Spokesman are located in the 'Masses House', a building on Church Street, Basseterre that also functions as the headquarters for the Trades and Labour Union and the Labour Party.
