= James Mumford =

English Jesuit priest and Catholic controversialist (1606 – 1666)

James Mumford (c.1606 – 9 March 1666) was an English Jesuit priest and Catholic controversialist.

Born in Norfolk or Suffolk, Mumford joined the Society of Jesus in 1626 in which he was ordained priest at Liège around 1635. He made his final Jesuit profession in 1641. He taught in the Jesuit colleges at St Omer, Watten, and Liège, where he was elected rector in 1648. He returned to England in 1650, based in Norwich as a member (and possibly later rector) of the Jesuit College of the Holy Apostles, which comprised the Jesuits' English mission to eastern counties. In the late 1650s he was arrested, displayed in the city streets, and imprisoned. After no witnesses were found to accuse him of the crime of being a priest, he was discharged and returned to mission work.

Aside from his controversial writings, Mumford wrote several works on purgatory.

== Works ==
- [as 'Optatus Ductor'], The Question of Questions, 1658. Republished 1686 and (under Mumford's name) 1687.
- The Catholick Scripturalist, Ghent, 1658.
- De Misericordia fidelibus defunctis exhibenda, 1647
