= Deutsch-Ostafrikanische Zeitung =

German East African newspaper (1899–1916)

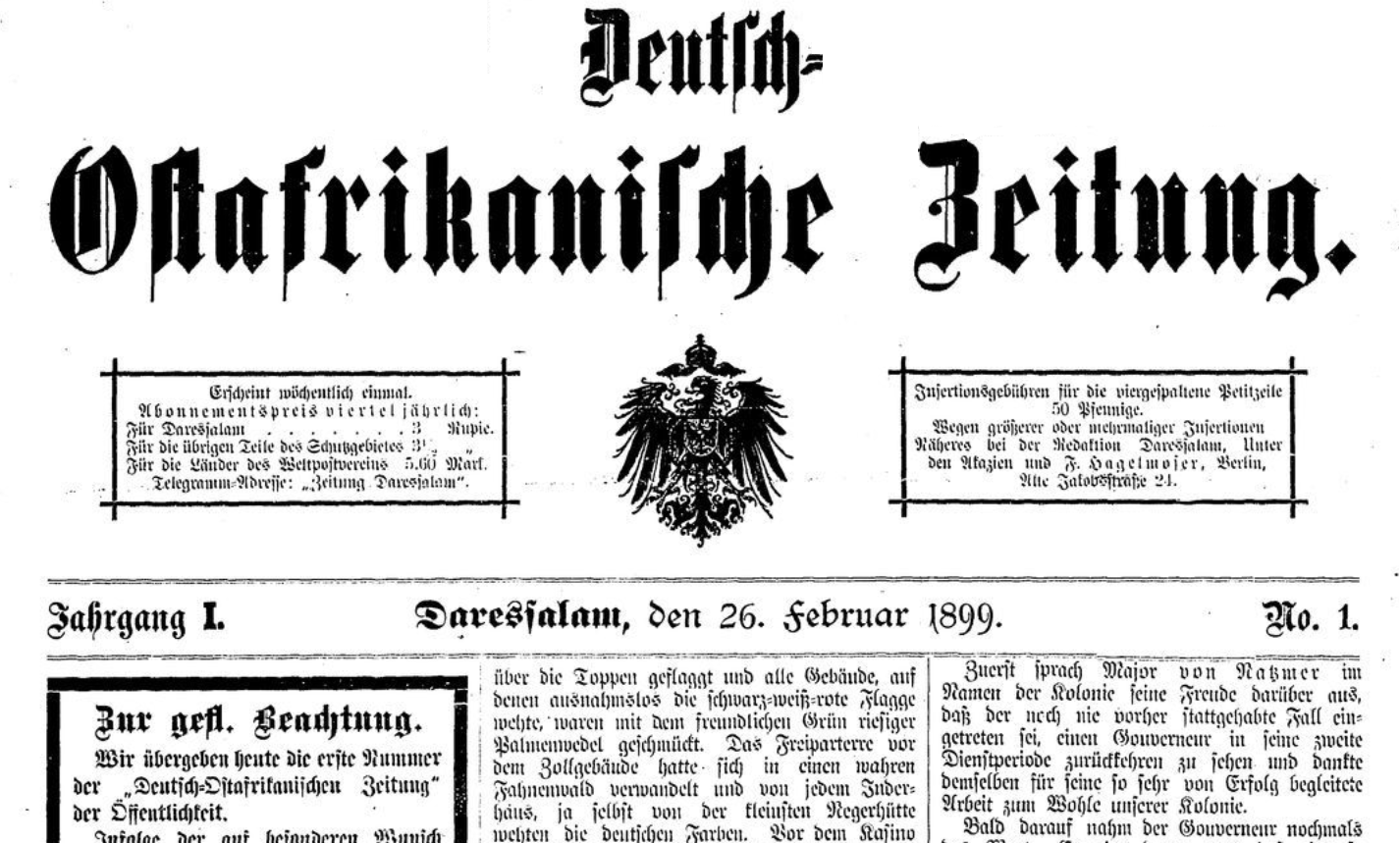
First edition of 1899, published in Dar es Salaam

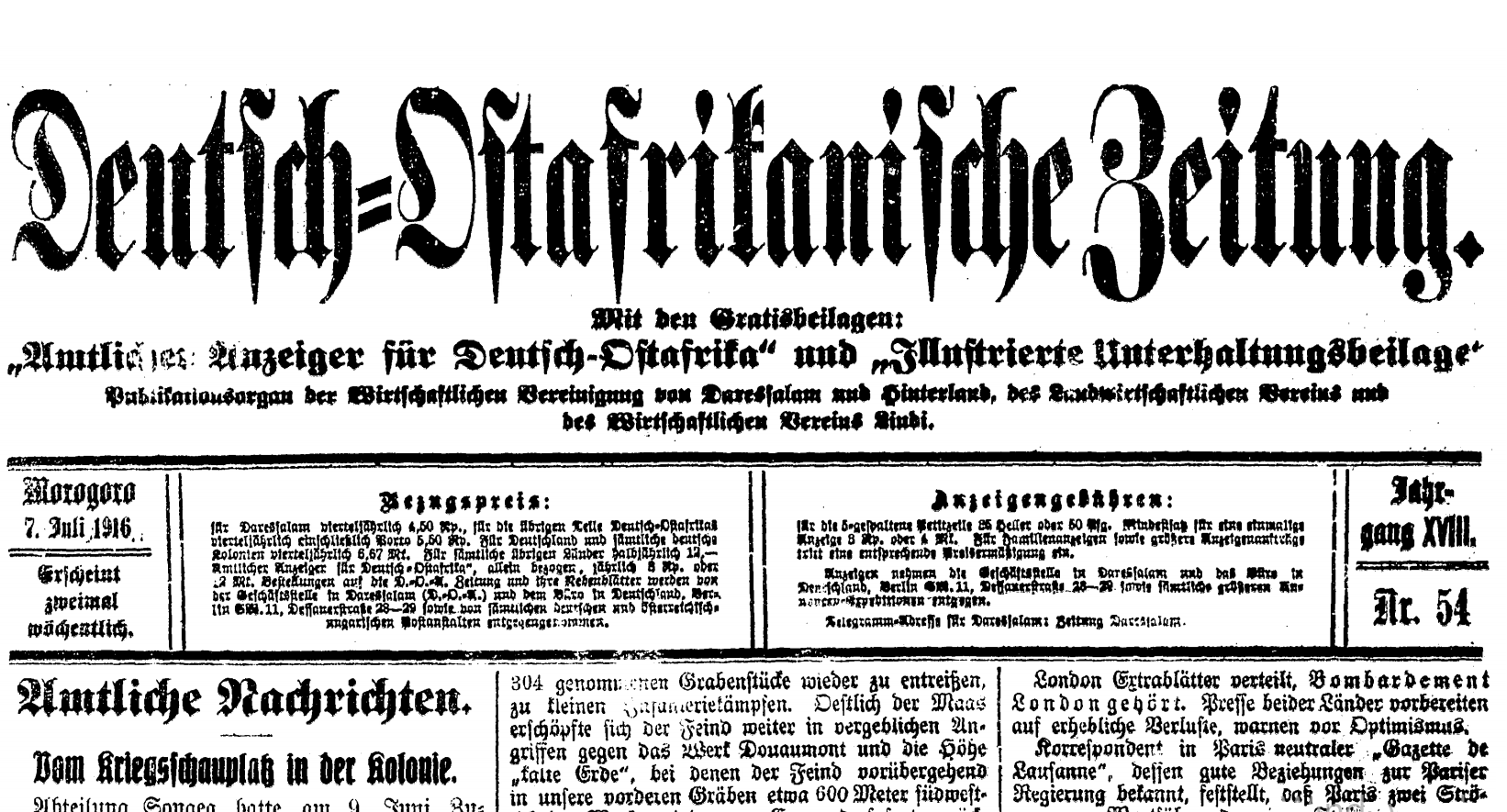
Edition of 7 July 1916, published in Morogoro (Dar es Salaam had already been occupied by British troops)

The Deutsch-Ostafrikanische Zeitung was a weekly German language newspaper published between 1899 and 1916 in Dar al-Salaam, German East Africa.

Its founder was Willy von Roy. The first issue was printed on 26 February 1899. In 1902 the edition was 1000 copies.

== History ==
In 1907, German settlers in Tanga in the Usambara Post attacked the colonial policy of Governor Albrecht von Rechenberg. The latter then instructed his officials not to support the newspaper published in the state German school of Tanga sheet, after which the newspaper was set. Willy von Roy declared his solidarity with the settlers and let print the Usaramo post office for three months for the vacant market.

Albrecht von Rechenberg, who wanted to promote African agriculture and a Euro-Indian merchant class, rejected an intensification of immigration from Europe and a promotion of German agriculture in East Africa. He showed little sympathy for German Colonial Society, but was open to African cultures, including languages. In contrast, the Deutsch-Ostafrikanische Zeitung represented the position of the German-born settlers.

A popular topic of the Deutsch-Ostafrikanische Zeitung was the confrontation with the northern neighbors, the Maasai. The newspaper quoted affirmatively Bishop Jean-Joseph Hirth (1854–1931) from Ukara, according to which the peace in the country could not be restored until the last Maasai was exterminated.

The German-East African government had the German-East African Rundschau relocated to promote government policy. The first issue appeared on August 22, 1908, but was not bought by the German settlers.

The government withdrew the 250 German government subscriptions from the Deutsch-Ostafrikanische Zeitung, did not print any more official advertisements, and took the concession to print the Official Gazette of German East Africa as well as Der Pflanzer.

Von Roy then published printed matter with similar-sounding names: Official Advertisements for German East Africa and The German East African Planter (first edition June 19, 1909).

Passavant, a journalist of the German East African Rundschau, researched that in 1899 a punishment had been imposed on Roy in a Bagatellsache. As a result, the German East African Newspaper reported that von Rechenberg had a homosexual relationship with one of his servants. Roy was sentenced in November 1910 by a court for [halitosis] to half a year in custody and deportation to the German Reich. Wilhelm II lifted the prison sentence, but not the expulsion from German East Africa. Von Roy appointed Alfred Zintgraff as publisher for the Deutsch-Ostafrikanische Zeitung in 1911. Zintgraff founded the Deutsch-Ostafrikanische Zeitungs G.m.b.H. Zintgraff Wilhelm Föllmer, chairman of the German Colonial Association, made the chairman of the supervisory board. Rechenberg was replaced in October 1911, and the German East African newspaper could from the bankruptcy estate German East African Rundschau of The Planter and Official Gazette for German East Africa ' 'Admit Advertisers and Subscription s.

When Dar es Salaam was occupied by the British Army during World War I, the newspaper relocated its printing site to Morogoro, where the latest issue appeared in August 1916.
