= The St. Kitts-Nevis Observer =

Newspaper serving St. Kitts and Nevis

- Type: Weekly newspaper (Friday)
- Publisher: St. Kitts-Nevis Publishing Association
- Editor: Kenneth Williams
- Language: English
- Headquarters: Observer Plaza, Observer Drive Post Office Box 510, Nevis, West Indie; Post Office Box 657 Basseterre St Kitts, West Indies
- City: Saint Kitts
- Country: Saint Kitts and Nevis
- Website: www.thestkittsnevisobserver.com

The St. Kitts-Nevis Observer is a newspaper serving St. Kitts and Nevis. The publication has a St. Kitts office in Basseterre and a Nevis office. The Observer began publishing in October 1994.
