= N'Djamena Hebdo =

Chadian weekly newspaper

The N'Djamena Hebdo is a Chadian newspaper. In the 1990s Chadian government security forces attacked the offices of the paper killing a number of journalists.
