= Searchlight (newspaper) =

- Type: Weekly newspaper
- Owner(s): Interactive Media Ltd.
- Editor: Clare Keizer
- Founded: 7 April 1995
- Headquarters: Kingstown, St. Vincent and the Grenadines
- Website: www.searchlight.vc

Searchlight is a privately owned weekly newspaper in Saint Vincent and the Grenadines. It is published by Interactive Media Ltd. in Kingstown, and one of two newspapers in the country that publish both in print and online.

== History ==
The newspaper was founded after Adrian Fraser, Bassy Alexander and Renwick Rose left The News due to disagreements with that paper's editor. The first edition was published on 7 April 1995. The paper is published on Fridays (both print and online) and on Tuesdays (online only). As of 2021, the CEO and editor is Ms. Clare Keizer.

For the newspaper's 20th anniversary in 2015, Interactive Media Ltd. helped to establish the nonprofit Norma Keizer Scholarship Foundation; Norma Keizer was the first managing editor. The foundation awards scholarships and bursaries to secondary school students.
