= List of newspapers in Grenada =

This list of newspapers in Grenada shows known current and historic newspapers that have been published in the southern Caribbean country of Grenada. There have been newspapers in Grenada since 1798.

== Current newspapers ==
- The Barnacle News – monthly
- The Grenada Informer – weekly - "The fearless weekly that tells it like it is." - established 1985. Published by Moving Target Company Limited.
- The Grenadian Voice – weekly - "The right alone is right, the wrong is always wrong."
- The New Today – weekly - "The pen is always mightier."
- NOW Grenada – online

== Newspapers that have ceased publication ==
The following newspapers, once published in Grenada, have ceased publication:

- Caribbean Monthly Bulletin (1966–1975)
- Chronicle and Gazette (1912–1915), British Library 013905004
- The Citizen’s Weekly (from 1959 to 1961), British Library 013905006
- The Corn (1975)
- Daily Tidings (from 1886 to 1886), British Library 013905007
- The Equilibrium (from 1882 to 1887), British Library 013927244
- Excelsior! (from 1876 to 1876)
- The Federalist (from 1896 to 1901), British Library 013927246
- The Federalist and Grenada People, circa 1901–1920, British Library 013927249
- The Forum (and Cribou in 1971), (1970–1972)
- The Grapevine circa 1963
- The Grenada Free Press and Public Gazette (1839–1840),British Library 013904998
- The Grenada Guardian (from 1930 to 1935), British Library 013904999
- The Grenada Newsletter (August 17, 1973 - 1975)
- The Grenada People (from 1883 to 1908), British Library 013905000
- The Grenada Phoenix (1864-1865), British Library 013927274
- The Grenada Reporter (from 1867 to 1867), British Library 013905002
- Grenadian Voice was a newspaper in St. George, Grenada
- Horizon
- The J.E.W.E.L. (1972–1973)
- The Negro World (existed in 1919)
- The New Jewel (1973–1979)
- New Dimensions (circa July 1974)
- The New Era (from 1878 to 1880), British Library 013927275
- The Road (1974)
- St. George's Chronicle and Grenada Gazette (1798–1857), St. George's, Grenada, Weekly, British Library 013905003
- The Star (from 1962 to 1962), British Library 013905008
- The Weekly Record (from 1865 to 1865), British Library 013905010
- This Was the Week That Was (May 13–20, 1973)
- The Torchlight (1955–1975), British Library 013927279
- Vanguard (1964-1973)
- The West Indian, (1915-1975), British Library 013927301
