= La Brújula Semanal (Managua) =

Weekly periodical

La Bújula Semanal was a free weekly periodical published in Nicaragua's capital, Managua since November 2008. It is mostly distributed in University campuses and semi-public spaces such as malls, supermarkets and cafés, with an alleged circulation of 7,000 copies per week.

Typically, La Brújula carries a brief summary of local and international news, a cover story with a little bit of in-depth reporting, and short pieces on science, technology, local tourism and lifestyle (usually translated and adapted from the international press). The printed edition also devotes plenty of space to free time and leisure activities, with an emphasis on identifying noteworthy movies on the local Cable TV system.

It appears to be the first Nicaraguan paper published under a Creative Commons license.

The last edition of the newspaper was No. 186, published between July 12 and July 18, 2012.
