= Der Landmann =

German-language Siberan Communist newspaper (1924–1930)

- Publisher: German Section, Siberian Bureau, RCP(b)
- Editor: Löffler
- Founded: 1924
- Ceased publication: 1930
- Political alignment: Communist
- Language: German language
- Headquarters: Omsk, Novosibirsk

Der Landmann ('The Farmer') was a German-language weekly newspaper. It was the organ of the German Section of the Siberian Bureau of the Central Committee of the Russian Communist Party (Bolsheviks). It was initially published from Omsk in 1924, but later moved to Novosibirsk after its 28 May 1925 issue. Löffler served as the editor of Der Landmann. Der Landmann was closed down in 1930.
