= La Voix des Belges =

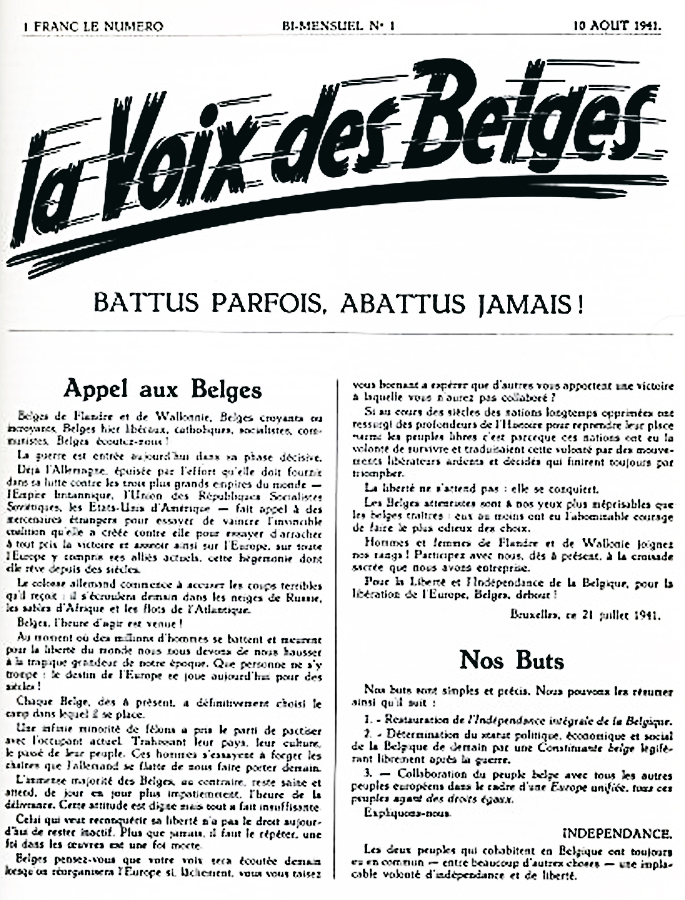
- The first issue of La Voix des Belges, 10 August 1941
- Owner: Belgian National Movement
- Founder(s): Aimé Dandoy and Camille Joset
- Founded: August 10, 1940
- Ceased publication: September 1944
- Language: French
- Circulation: 26,000 copies

The Voice of the Belgians (French: La Voix des Belges, pronounced [la vwa de bɛlʒ]; Dutch: de Stem der Belgen) was a bi-monthly clandestine newspaper published by the Belgian National Movement (MNB) during the German occupation in World War II. In total, 41 issues were published.

== Publication ==
The newspaper, founded by Aimé Dandoy and Camille Joset, first appeared in August 1941, carrying the headline "Sometimes beaten, never defeated!" (French: "Battus parfois, abattus jamais!"). The editorship of the newspaper was changed repeatedly, after first Aimé Dandoy and then Camille Joset were arrested by the Gestapo. Amongst the later editors was Camille-Jean Joset, son of Camille Joset. In February 1944, there were multiple arrests of leading members of the Belgian National Movement and the publication of Voix des Belges was disrupted. When it reappeared in May 1944, it was in a reduced format, renamed La Petite Voix des Belges.

The newspaper continued to be published until liberation in September 1944.
