= El Telégrafo =

Uruguayan newspaper founded in 1910

- Founder(s): Ángel Carotini; Miguel Arturo Baccaro
- Founded: July 1, 1910
- Language: Spanish
- Headquarters: Paysandú, Uruguay
- Website: http://www.eltelegrafo.com

El Telégrafo is a Uruguayan newspaper from Paysandú. Established on July 1, 1910 by Ángel Carotini and Miguel Arturo Baccaro. Nowadays it is the oldest circulating newspaper in Uruguay.
