= Marc Neil-Jones =

Vanuatuan journalist (1957–2025)

- Born: 14 October 1957; England
- Died: 10 March 2025 (aged 67); Vanuatu
- Occupations: Journalist, publisher
- Known for: Founder of the Vanuatu Daily Post
- Notable work: Trading Post, Vanuatu Daily Post

Marc Neil-Jones (14 October 1957 – 10 March 2025) was an English-born Vanuatuan journalist. A campaigner for freedom of the press, he was assaulted several times, as well as briefly deported and imprisoned. Radio New Zealand has described him as "one of the Pacific's most significant journalistic figures".

== Early life and career ==
A British national, Neil-Jones was born in England on 14 October 1957. He worked in advertising and as a marketing manager in Papua New Guinea from 1982, then moved to Vanuatu in 1989. He became a naturalised Vanuatuan citizen around 2003.

== Publishing career ==
In 1993 Neil-Jones purchased the fledgling newspaper Trading Post, which "was read by a few hundred expatriates and consisted a few general interest news items and classified ads but no local news". Neil-Jones received permission from Prime Minister Maxime Carlot Korman's government to develop it into a newspaper carrying local Vanuatuan news, including political news. With Kalvao Moli (a future MP) as its main journalist, the Trading Post became a weekly then (in 1994) bi-weekly newspaper, the only private newspaper in the country at the time. From the late 1990s, the newspaper printed detailed reports on government corruption, written by ombudsman Marie Noelle Patterson. From 2001 the paper was published three times a week.

== Arrests ==
In 2001, the Trading Post revealed Prime Minister Barak Sope's involvement in a case of forged bank guarantees. Sope issued a deportation order against Neil-Jones, on the grounds that the latter had published a state secret. Neil-Jones was arrested and put on a plane to Australia, without being allowed to pack even his insulin medication. The deportation order was overturned by Chief Justice Vincent Lunabek; Sope was later convicted of forgery and sentenced to three years in gaol.

In 2002, Neil-Jones launched the Vanuatu Daily Post, the country's first daily newspaper. In 2006, the paper's sports editor Samuel Taffo was assaulted by a police officer. Neil-Jones demanded that the officer be suspended. In response, police officers arrested Neil-Jones at the newspaper office, and confined him to the maximum security gaol. He was released that same day without charge after an intervention by his lawyer, but not without first having talked to fellow inmates about living conditions in the prison. Upon his release, he published a report on human rights abuses against prisoners in gaol.

== Later life and death ==
In 2009, the Daily Post again reported on human rights abuses in prison, which led to the dismissing of a prison director. Subsequently, four men assaulted Neil-Jones at the newspaper offices. He was left with a broken nose and a black eye, as well as multiple bruises from kicks to the body. He reported that his attackers had threatened to shoot him and to slit his throat.

In March 2011, Minister for Infrastructure Harry Iauko led a group of men into the newspaper's offices and watched them kick and throttle Neil-Jones. This followed allegations of corruption which the Daily Post had published against Iauko. Iauko later pleaded guilty to aiding and abetting assault, but was sentenced only to a small fine, a sentence criticised by Reporters Without Borders.

In February 2015, Neil-Jones announced he was going into semi-retirement from running the Daily Post, to focus on the development of a resort.

Neil-Jones died after a long illness on 10 March 2025, at the age of 67.
