= Grenz-Echo =

German-language Belgian daily newspaper

- Type: Daily newspaper
- Founded: 1 June 1927; 98 years ago
- Language: German
- Headquarters: Eupen
- Website: GrenzEcho

Grenz-Echo is the only German language daily newspaper published in Eupen, Belgium, aimed at the German-speaking community and the neighbouring areas in the east of the country.

== History and profile ==
Grenz-Echo was first published in June 1927. The paper calls itself a politically independent, tolerant and Christian daily and is published six days per week. The headquarters of the paper is in Eupen. It provides both local and international news.

Grenz-Echo was banned in Germany in the 1933 due to its anti-Nazi stance. The paper was relaunched following World War II.

Its circulation in 2002 was 12,382 copies with the market share of 1.9%. The circulation of Grenz-Echo was 11,757 copies in 2008 and 11,980 copies in 2009. It was 12,104 copies in 2010 and 11,991 copies in 2011.
