= The Brussels Times =

English-language news magazine in Brussels, Belgium

- Cover of The Brussels Times magazine no. 58, February-March 2025
- Categories: Daily online news website and print magazine
- Format: Daily online newspaper platform and print magazine
- Publisher: BXL Connect
- Country: Belgium
- Based in: Brussels
- Language: English
- Website: www.brusselstimes.com
- ISSN: 0772-1633

The Brussels Times is an English-language Belgian news website and magazine, headquartered on the Avenue Louise/Louizalaan in Brussels.

The media serves Belgium, particularly covering local and European news. It is now the largest news outlet targeting the expatriate community in Belgium. The digital website has a soft paywall and the print magazine is sold in shops and available for subscription.

== History ==
In 2014, the BXL Connect branded as The Brussels Times with a strategy adapted for the digital age. Articles published by The Brussels Times detailing racism or homophobia incidents in Belgium were picked up by PinkNews in 2019, by Anadolu Agency in 2023, and by Maeil Business Newspaper in August 2024.

== Audience ==
The Brussels Times covers general news, business, EU affairs, op-eds, and other topic areas. It is today the largest English-language print and digital media in the Benelux.

The Brussels Times is aimed at EU officials, researchers, development professionals and diplomats based in Belgium. According to Thomas M. Wilson, an anthropology professor at Binghamton University, its coverage mostly focuses on EU affairs. "It has no political affiliation with any party and aims to present the news fairly and offer a wide range of analysis and opinion pieces, both local and global."

The media is also popular with Brussels "influencers", with 32% of MEPs and policymakers surveyed in the EU Media Poll (BCW Global) in 2022 and 2023 saying that they read it and found it influential.

== Magazine ==
The Brussels Times publishes a bi-monthly magazine that is sold and distributed to European institutions and embassies across the city.

The Brussels Times magazine focuses on stories about Brussels and Belgium, covering politics, art, history, food, sport, and other issues. It is currently edited by Brussels correspondent at The i Paper, Leo Cendrowicz. Recent covers of the magazine have been illustrated by Ghent-based Belgian cartoonist Lectr.

== Contributors ==
Contributors include José Manuel Barroso, Derek Blyth, Josep Borrell, Leo Cendrowicz, Mikuláš Dzurinda, Philippe Legrain, Marc Otte, Sam Rainsy, Philippe Van Parijs, and Pernille Weiss.

Derek Blyth, author of 'The 500 Hidden Secrets of Brussels', is a regular contributor.
