= Pentecost Star =

- Type: Weekly newspaper
- Owner: Keithly Hango
- Editor: Keithly Hango
- Founded: 2007
- Language: English
- Headquarters: Pentecost Island

The Pentecost Star is a ni-Vanuatu weekly newspaper, issued on Pentecost Island. It was founded in August 2007 by Keithly Hango.

The Star has the particularity of having started out as "the only newspaper that’s written by hand". Its founder was a 37-year-old "former Trading Post newspaper boy", who stated that his aim was "to disseminate interesting, factual information to the people of Pentecost". Hango wrote every edition entirely by hand, and distributed copies to Sara Airport and to the Saratamata Penama Provincial Government Council. He received congratulations and best wishes from the Solomon Times "for his exemplary efforts in undertaking such an initiative".

In April 2008, Hango visited Vanuatu's capital, Port Vila, to publicise his newspaper in the hopes of developing it further. In July, Radio Vanuatu reported that the newspaper had been relaunched in printed form, and that it would be distributed in Port Vila and Luganville.
