= Montsame =

Official state-owned news agency of Mongolia

MONTSAME

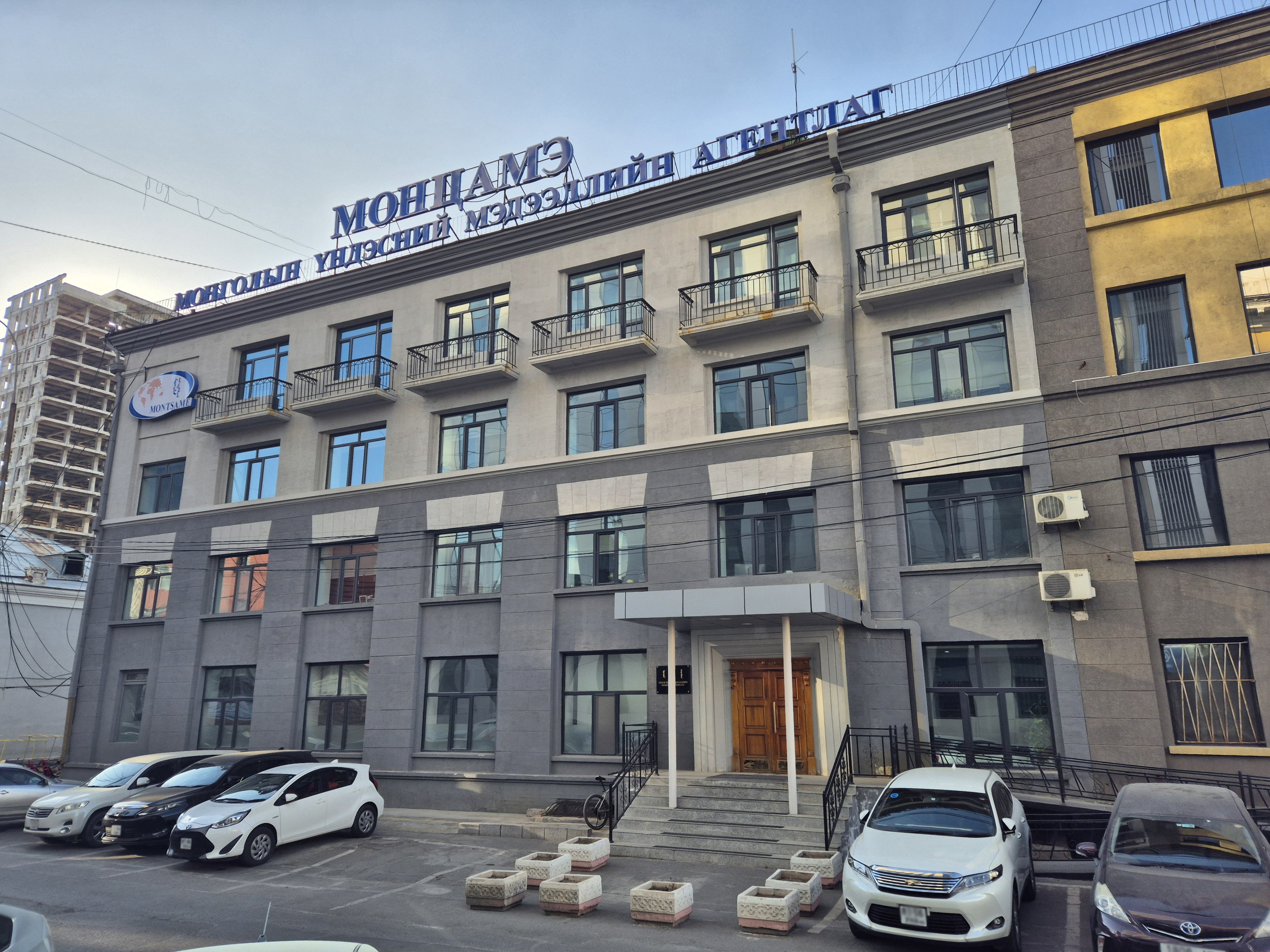
- Company type: State-owned
- Industry: News media (news agency)
- Founded: 1921
- Headquarters: Ulaanbaatar
- Owner: Government of Mongolia
- Website: www.montsame.mn/en/ (in English)

Montsame (Mongolian: МОНЦАМЭ, [mɔnt͡sɑmɛ]) is the official state-owned news agency of Mongolia. Montsame is an acronym for Mongolyn Tsakhilgaan Medee (Mongolian: Монголын Цахилгаан Мэдээ, lit. 'Mongolian Electronic News'). It was founded in 1921. It has permanent correspondents in Ulaanbaatar, Mongolian aimag centers, Beijing, and Moscow.

== International cooperation ==
The news agency has cooperation agreements with Information Telegraph Agency of Russia, Reuters, Xinhua, Yonhap, Vietnam News Agency, Prensa Latina, Polish Press Agency, Bulgarian News Agency, Anadolu Agency, Ukrinform, Voice of America, Azerbaijan State Telegraph Agency, Kazinform, Mehr News Agency, and Korean Central News Agency.

== Publications ==
=== Mongolian ===
- www.montsame.mn - Website
- МОНЦАМЭ Мэдээ (MONTSAME medee) - Weekly outline of Mongolia-related news around the world
- МОНЦАМЭ Тойм (MONTSAME toim) - Monthly magazine
- ᠬᠦᠮᠦᠨ ᠪᠢᠴᠢᠭ (Khümüün bichig) - Weekly newspaper in Mongolian script

=== Foreign language ===
- MONTSAME Daily News, MONTSAME Novostii - Daily newsletter in Russian
- MONTA tele studi - Daily Mongolia related videos in English
- Новости Монголии (Novosti Mongolii) - Weekly newspaper in Russian
- The Mongol Messenger - Weekly newspaper in English
- 蒙古消息报 (Menggu xiaoxibao) - Weekly newspaper in China
- モンゴル通信 (Mongoru Tsuushin) - Weekly newspaper in Japan
- Mongolia Today - seasonal magazine in English
- Mongolia - yearly booklet in English

== See also ==
- Media of Mongolia
