= Tohi Tala Niue =

Niuean daily newspaper

Tohi Tala Niue was a Niuean daily newspaper published from October 1953 to June 1992.

It began in 1953 as a news sheet published by the New Zealand colonial administration in the Niuean language, alongside an English language news sheet called the Niue Newsletter. It was started by CEH Quin after the death of Hector Larsen as a way of building relationships between the Islanders and the Administration. In January 1966, both versions were combined into a bilingual Tohi Tala Niue, published by Niue's Community Development Office (which in 1987 became the Office of Community Affairs) in Alofi.
