= El Periódico (Honduras) =

Honduran newspaper

- Type: Daily newspaper
- Format: Broadsheet
- Political alignment: conservative
- Headquarters: Tegucigalpa
- Website: El Periódico

El Periódico is a Honduran newspaper. Former President Rafael Leonardo Callejas is the principal stockholder, and "the paper is known for its conservative views."
