= Vanuatu Daily Post =

Newspaper published in Port Vila, Vanuatu

- Front page of the Vanuatu Daily Post on March 5, 2011
- Type: Daily newspaper
- Owner: Dan McGarry (media director)
- Founder: Marc Neil-Jones
- Publisher: Trading Post Ltd
- Editor: Jane Joshua
- Founded: 1993; 32 years ago
- Language: English
- Headquarters: Port Vila, Vanuatu
- Website: www.dailypost.vu

The Vanuatu Daily Post is a newspaper published in Port Vila in Vanuatu. It is the only daily newspaper in Vanuatu.

In 1993, British journalist Marc Neil-Jones acquired the rights to publish the periodical The Trading Post and used it as the foundation for creating the first professional newspaper in Vanuatu. The publication is issued in English. Initially, it was released weekly, and the company obtained its first independent funding by winning a tender to redesign the telephone directory.

Within the first year, circulation reached 2,000 copies, and the title began appearing twice a week. Since May 2003, it has been published as the Vanuatu Daily Post and operates as a daily newspaper.

The newspaper's founder, Marc Neil-Jones, had been the victim of physical attacks supported by government ministers during his time at the newspaper. He died March 10, 2025.

== Work permit controversy ==
Dan McGarry, the newspaper's media director and a Canadian national, announced on 7 November 2019 that the Vanuatu government had refused to renew his work permit. McGarry stated that the 'overt reason' was that his role should have been 'localized' (filled by a Vanuatu citizen) but claimed that the 'real reason' was that the Daily Post's reporting had discomforted the government. He has appealed against the decision.

On 6 July 2019, the Daily Post published an article detailing the deportation of six Chinese nationals by the Vanuatuan government. Four of the six nationals had been granted Vanuatuan citizenship under the country's Development Support Programme. McGarry said he was 'quite confident' it was coverage of that story which had upset the government.

McGarry, who has lived in Vanuatu for 16 years and whose spouse and children are from the country, stated that in July 2019, the Prime Minister Charlot Salwai berated him for what Salwai said was his 'negative' reporting and said 'If you don't like it here, go home'.

Vanuatu's Media Association called on the government to reconsider and afford the correct legal rights to McGarry.
