= Public library =

Collection of books accessible by the public

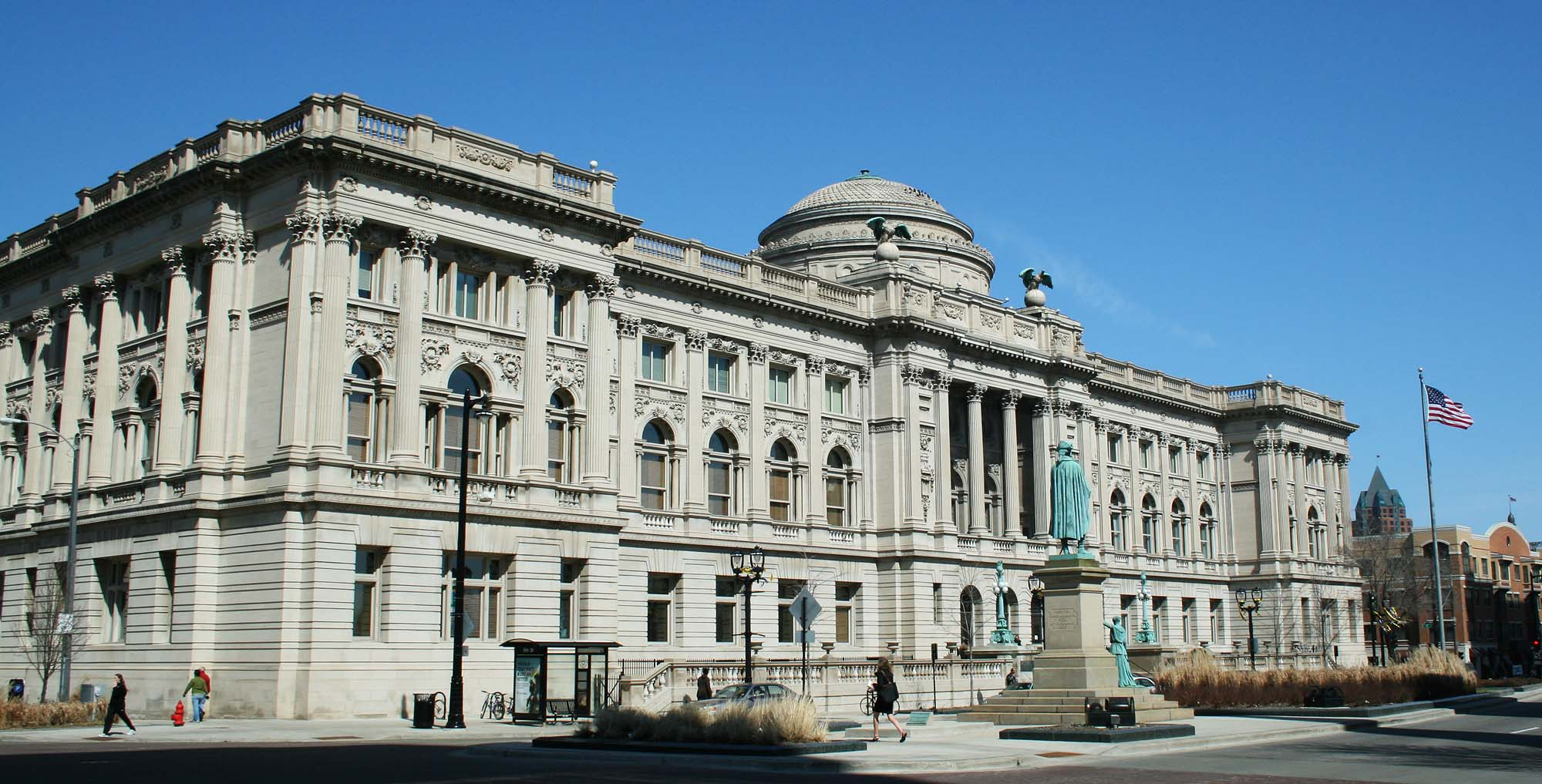
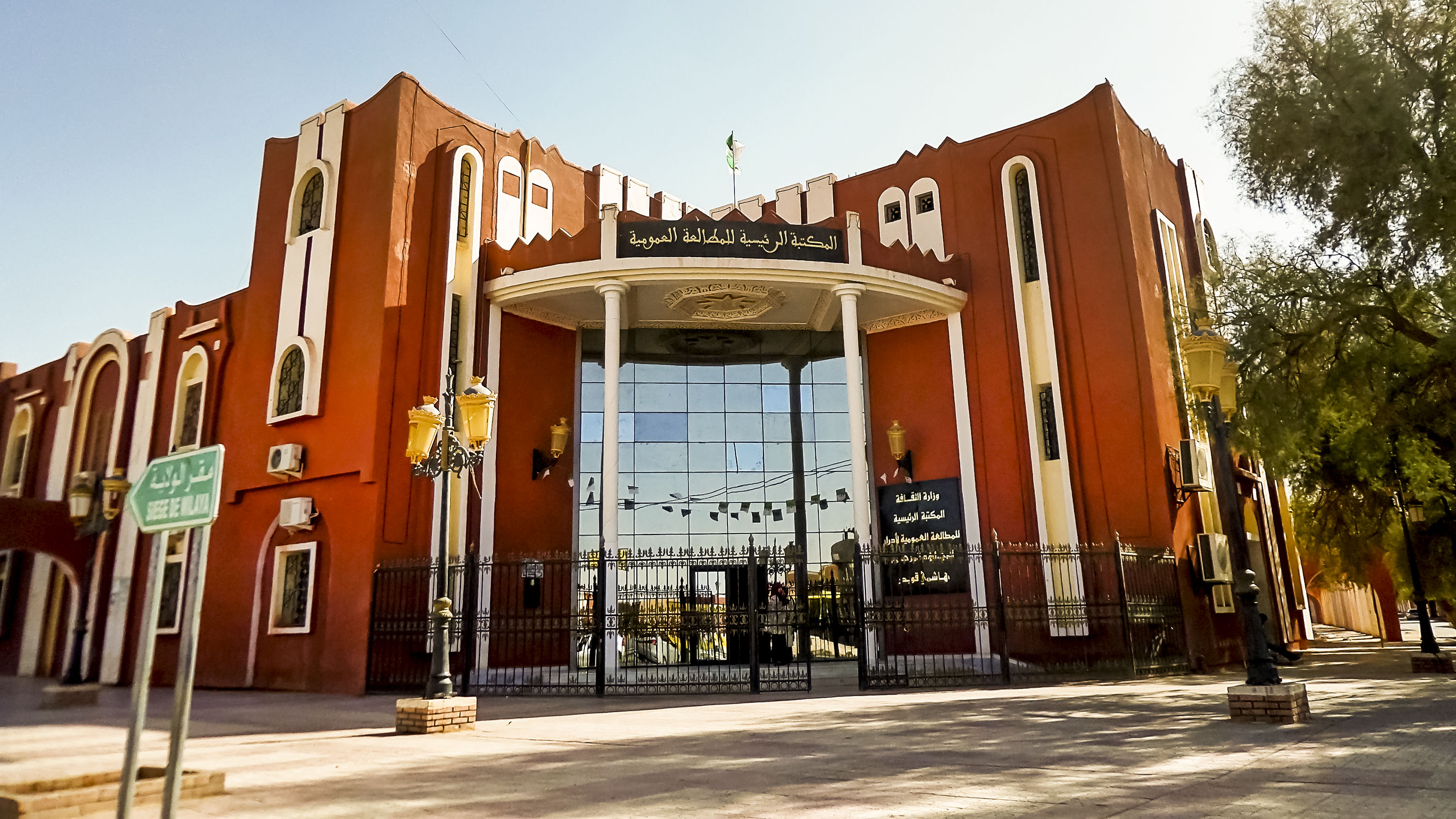
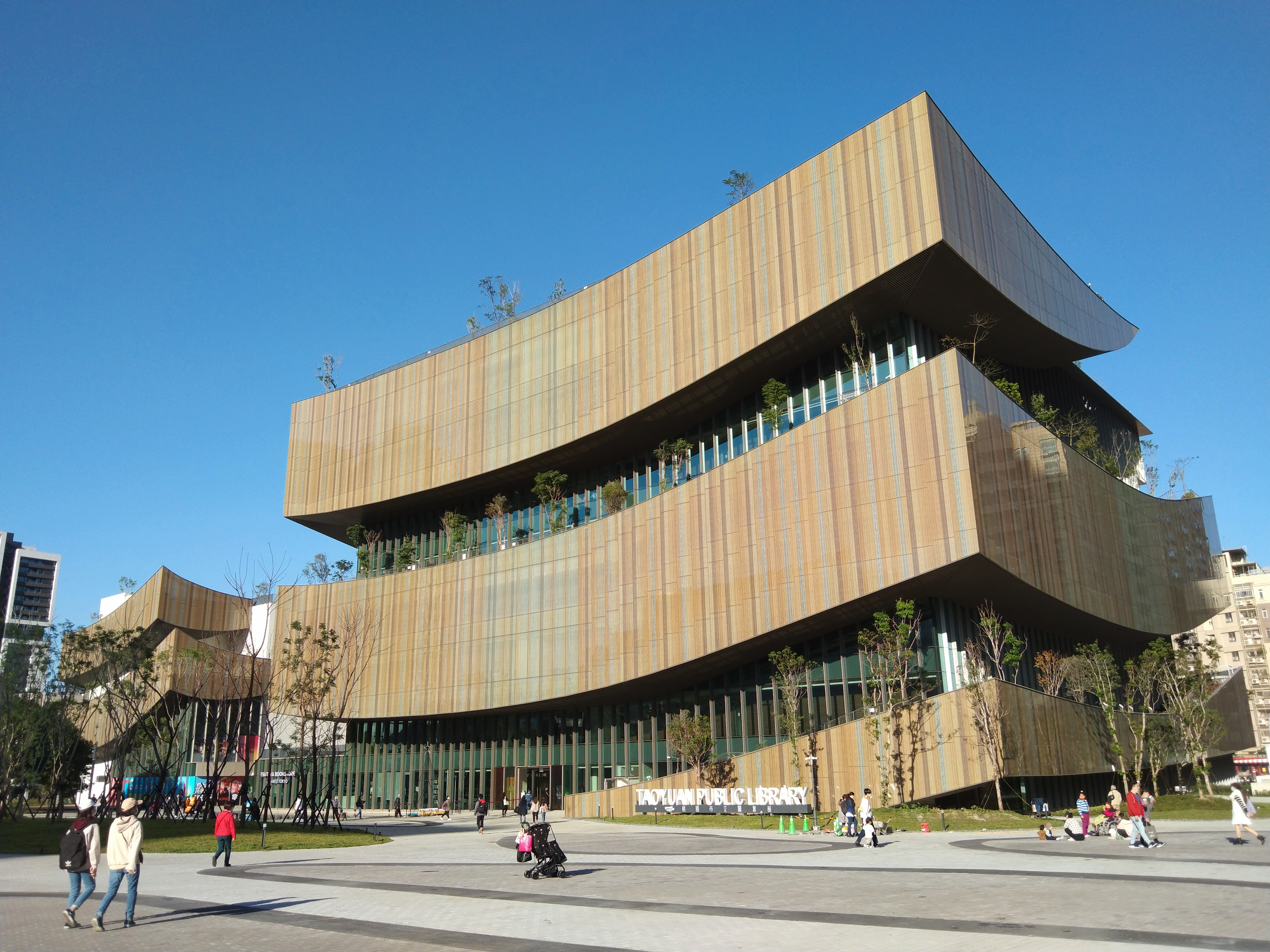
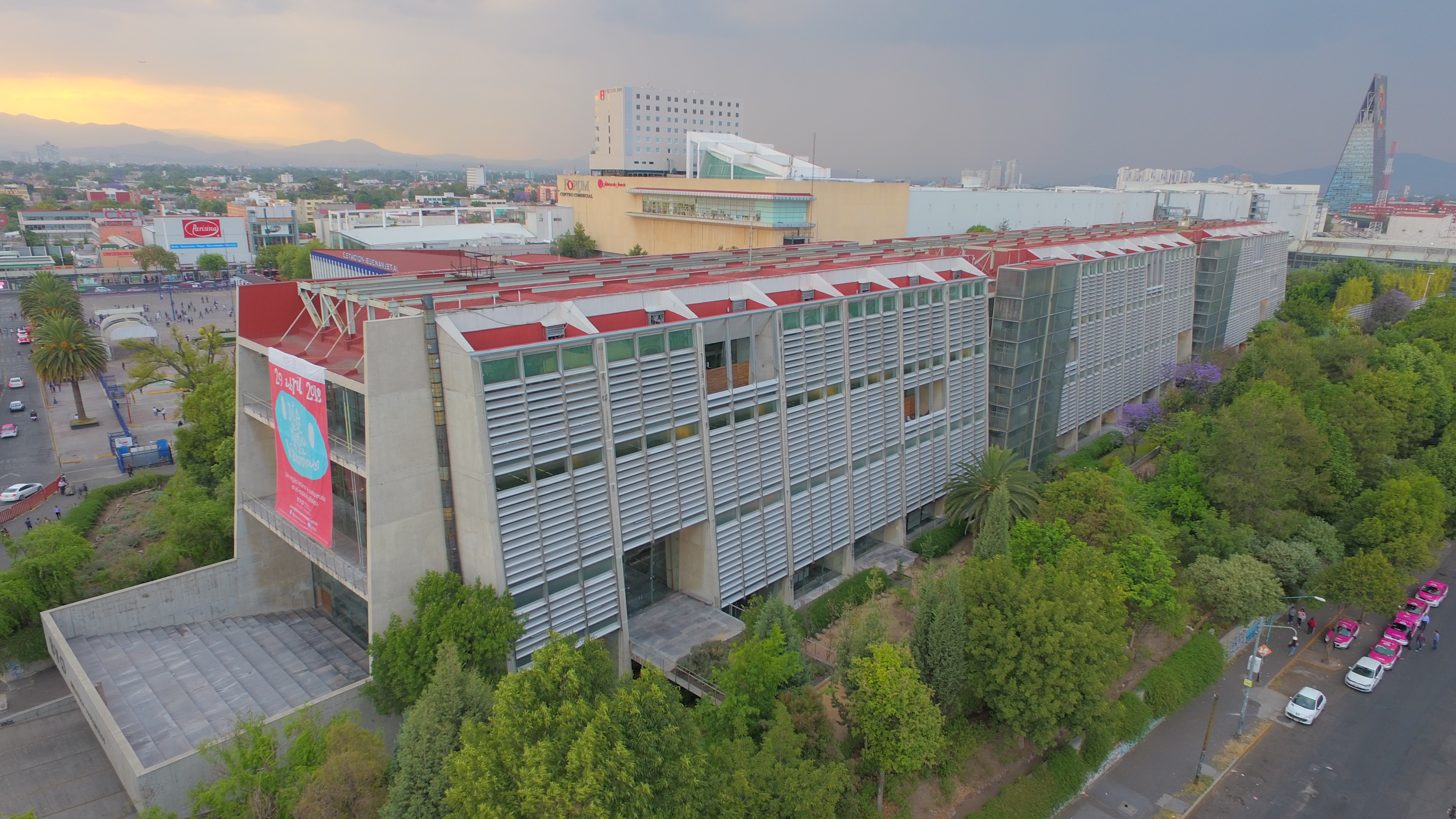
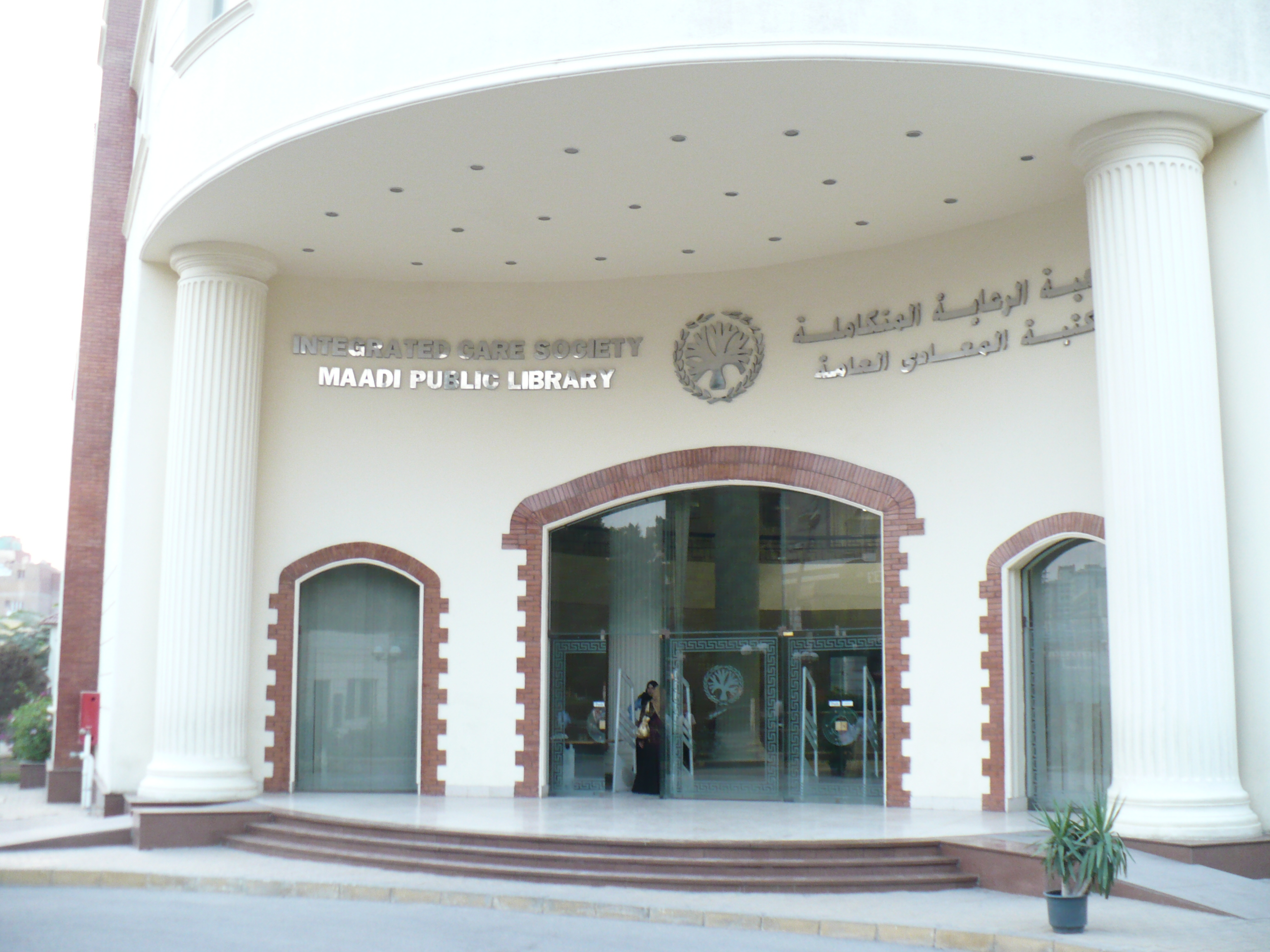
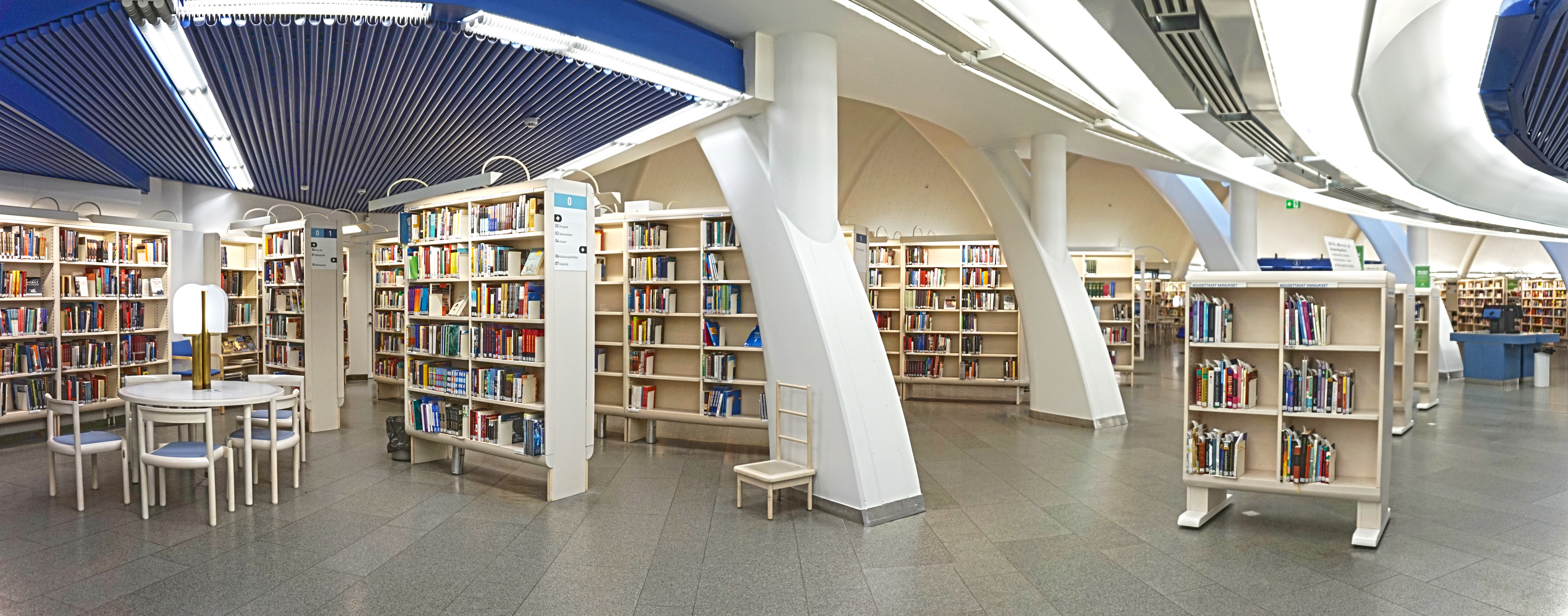
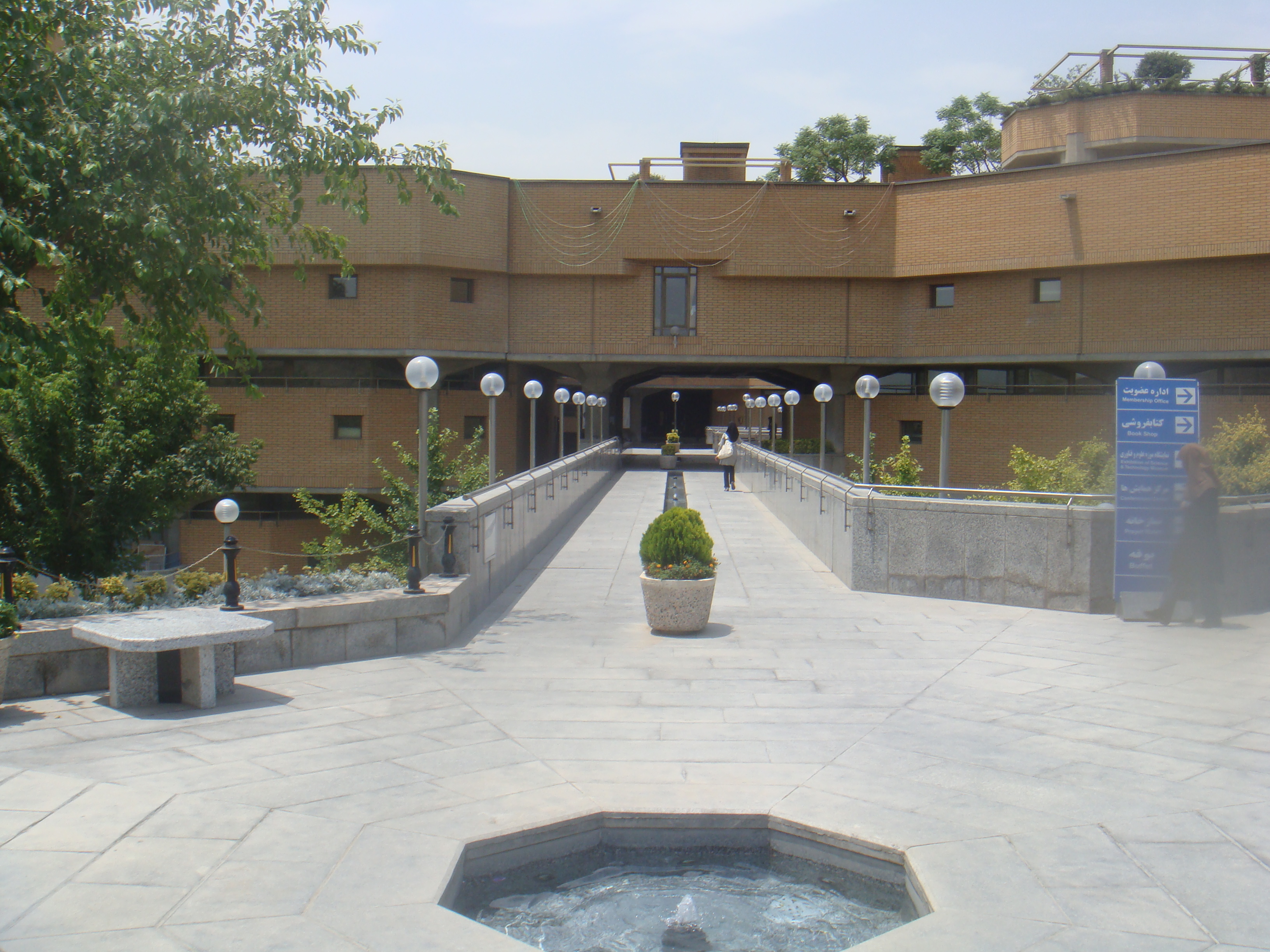
- Central Library, Milwaukee, Wisconsin Bibliothèque, Adrar, Algeria Main Public Library, Taoyuan, Taiwan Biblioteca Vasconcelos, Mexico City, Mexico Public library, Maadi, Egypt Interior of the Central Library, Tampere, Finland Entrance of National Library, Tehran, Iran

A public library is a library, most often a lending library, that is accessible by the general public and is usually funded from public sources, such as taxes. It is operated by librarians and library paraprofessionals, who are also civil servants.

Public libraries are supported by taxes, are open to all who wish to access the library collection, and do not charge money for access to the library collection.

Public libraries exist in many countries across the world and are often considered an essential part of having an educated and literate population. Public libraries are distinct from research libraries, school libraries, academic libraries in other states and other special libraries. Their mandate is to serve the general public's information needs rather than the needs of a particular school, institution, or research population. Public libraries also provide free services such as preschool story times to encourage early literacy among children. They also provide a quiet study and learning areas for students and professionals and foster the formation of book clubs to encourage the appreciation of literature by the young and adults. Public libraries typically allow users to borrow books and other materials outside the library premises temporarily, usually for a given period of time. In addition to their traditional role of circulating collections of books and media, public libraries serve as vital hubs that offer essential non-circulating reference resources and provide diverse community members with equitable access to modern computing technology and the internet.

== Overview ==
The culmination of centuries of advances in the printing press, moveable type, paper, ink, publishing, and distribution, combined with an ever-growing information-oriented middle class, increased commercial activity and consumption, new radical ideas, massive population growth and higher literacy rates forged the public library into the form that it is today.

Public access to books is not new. Romans made scrolls in dry rooms available to patrons of the baths, and tried with some success to establish libraries within the empire. Public libraries existed in the Roman Empire by the 1st century BC.

In the middle of the 19th century, the push for truly public libraries, paid for by taxes and run by the state gained force. Matthew Battles states that:

It was in these years of class conflict and economic terror that the public library movement swept through Britain, as the nation's progressive elite recognized that the light of cultural and intellectual energy was lacking in the lives of commoners.

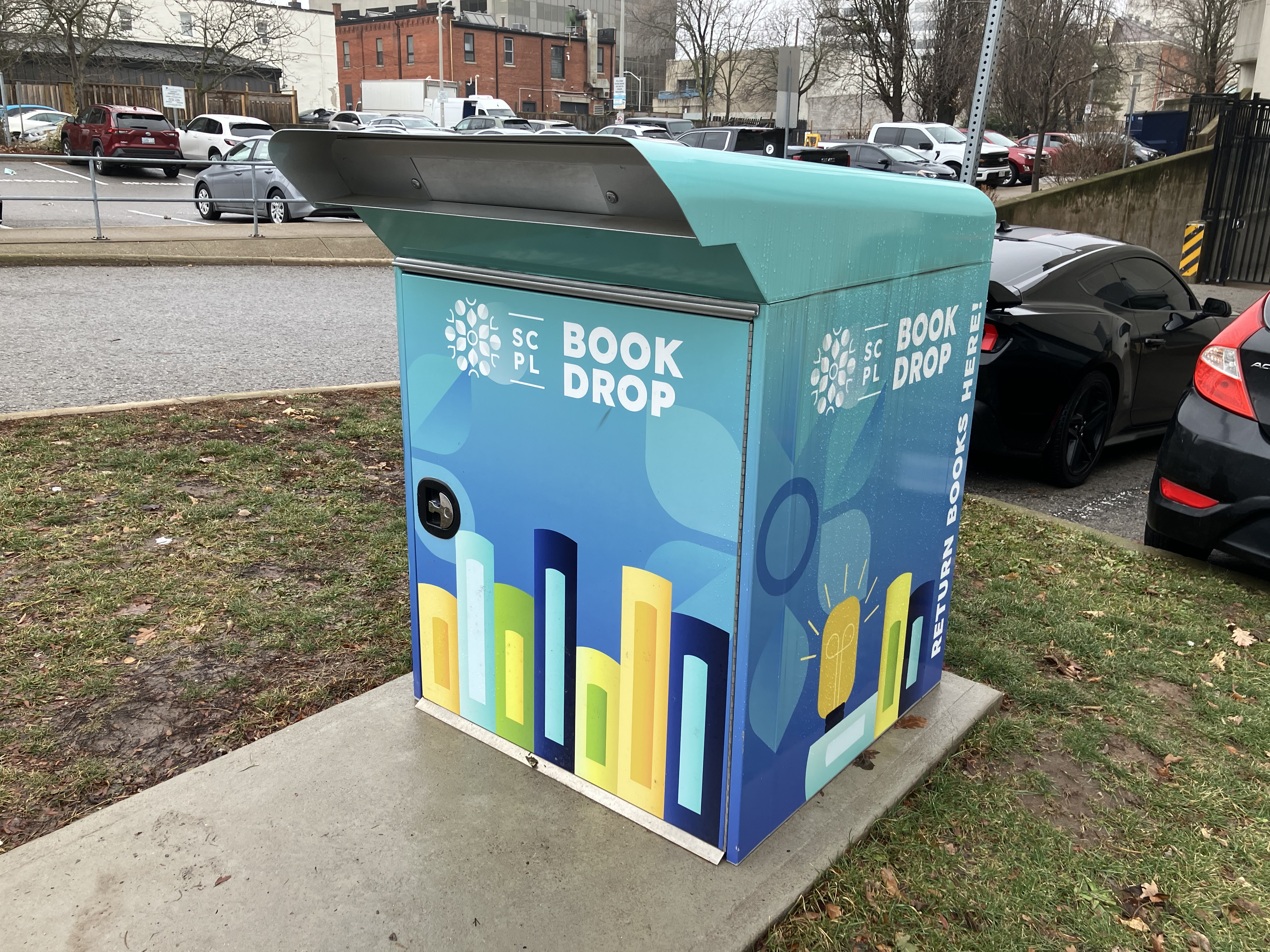
An outdoor book drop box.

Public libraries were often started with a donation, or were bequeathed to parishes, churches, schools or towns. These social and institutional libraries formed the base of many academic and public library collections of today.

The establishment of circulating libraries in the 18th century by booksellers and publishers provided a means of gaining profit and creating social centers within the community. The circulating libraries not only provided a place to sell books, but also a place to lend books for a price. These circulating libraries provided a variety of materials including the increasingly popular novels. Although the circulating libraries filled an important role in society, members of the middle and upper classes often looked down upon these libraries that regularly sold material from their collections and provided materials that were less sophisticated.

Circulating libraries also charged a subscription fee. However, these fees were set to entice their patrons, providing subscriptions on a yearly, quarterly or monthly basis, without expecting the subscribers to purchase a share in the circulating library. This helped patrons who could not afford to buy books, to be able to borrow books to read, and then return. This also created a more popular demand, as book fees were growing, and more books were being copied. Circulating libraries were very popular; the first one was located in 1725, in Edinburgh, Scotland, by Allan Ramsay.

Circulating libraries were not exclusively lending institutions and often provided a place for other forms of commercial activity, which may or may not be related to print. This was necessary because the circulating libraries did not generate enough funds through subscription fees collected from its borrowers. As a commerce venture, it was important to consider the contributing factors such as other goods or services available to the subscribers.

== History ==
=== Early history ===
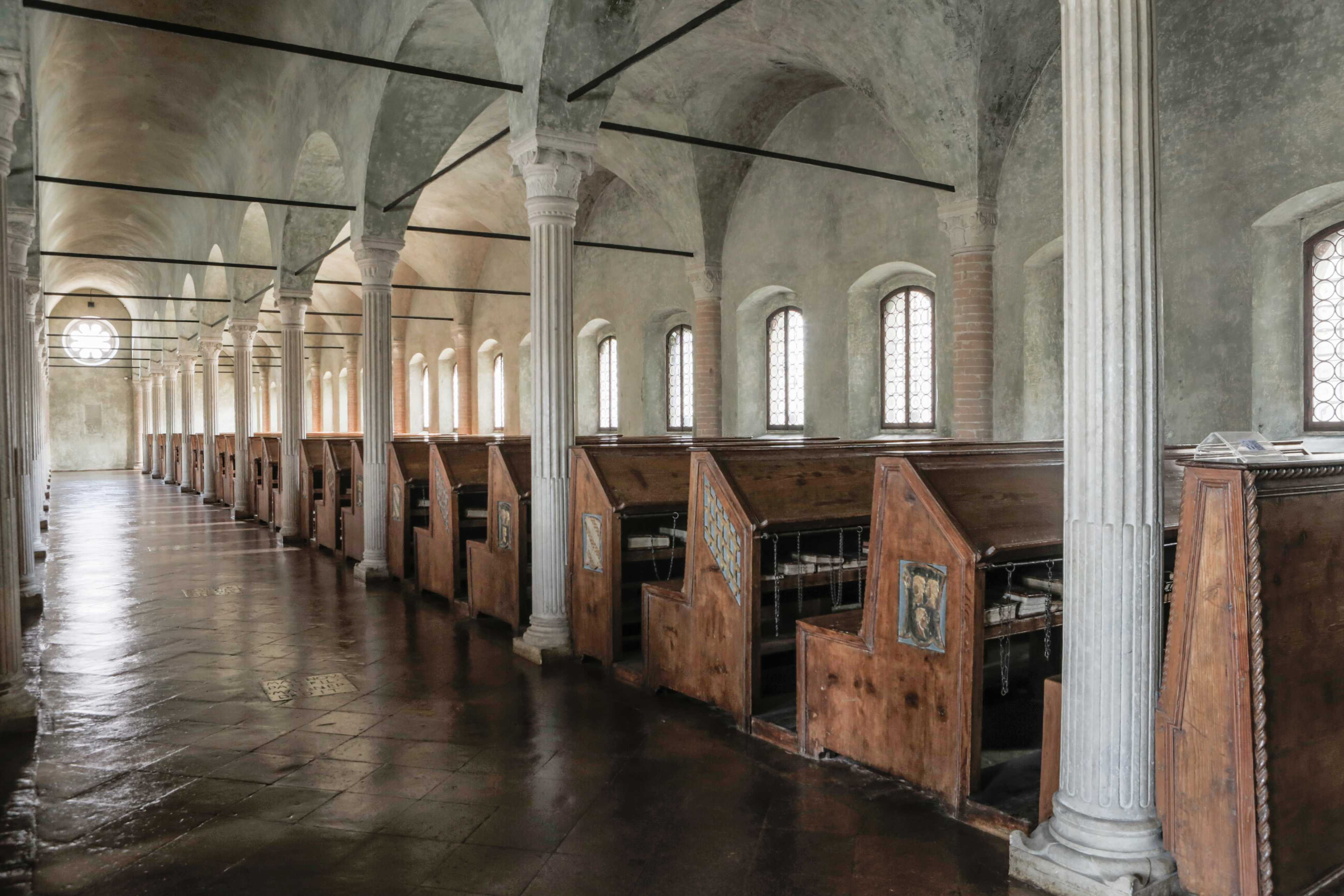
Sala (hall) del Nuti of Malatestiana Library, established in 1447

The first libraries consisted of archives of the earliest form of writing – the clay tablets in cuneiform script discovered in temple rooms in Sumer, some dating back to 2600 BC. They appeared five thousand years ago in Southwest Asia's Fertile Crescent, an area that ran from Mesopotamia to the Nile in Africa. Known as the cradle of civilization, the Fertile Crescent was likewise the birthplace of writing, sometime before 3000 BC. These first libraries, which mainly consisted of the records of commercial transactions or inventories, mark the end of prehistory and the start of history.

Things were very similar in the government and temple records on papyrus of Ancient Egypt. The earliest discovered private archives were kept at Ugarit; besides correspondence and inventories, texts of myths may have been standardized practice-texts for teaching new scribes.

Persia at the time of the Achaemenid Empire (550–330 BC) was home to some outstanding libraries that served two main functions: keeping the records of administrative documents (e.g., transactions, governmental orders, and budget allocation within and between the Satrapies and the central ruling State) and collection of resources on different sets of principles e.g. medical science, astronomy, history, geometry and philosophy.

A public library was established in Rome by the first century BC, in the Atrium Libertatis (see History of libraries § Classical period and Gaius Asinius Pollio § Later life). However, the first major public library is said to have been established in Athens by Pisistratus in the sixth century BC (see Library of Alexandria § Historical background), and by the end of the Hellenistic period, public libraries are said to have been widespread in the Eastern Mediterranean (see Library of Alexandria § In antiquity).

Historian Yahya of Antioch (d. 1066) reported that the Fatimid Caliph Al-Hakim bi-Amr Allah (r. 996–1021) financed and established libraries open to the public, where anyone, even the simple non-specialists, could choose whatever books they wanted and have them copied by public scribes, free of charge. However, as with many of his other decisions, Al-Hakim later ordered this policy to be reversed.

The Malatestiana Library (Biblioteca Malatestiana) in Cesena, Italy, is regarded as the first community-run public library in Europe. The building and creation of the library was commissioned by the Lord of Cesena, Malatesta Novello. At Novello's direction, the books were owned by the commune of Cesena, not the monastery or the family. It was established in 1447 with the building completed in 1452 and provided secular and religious works in Latin, Greek, and Hebrew and was institutionally open to all members of the public as a civic, non-monastic library. The library was organized as a chained library, with each manuscript fixed to its desk or bookcase by a metal chain, and the collection was for consultation on site rather than for lending.

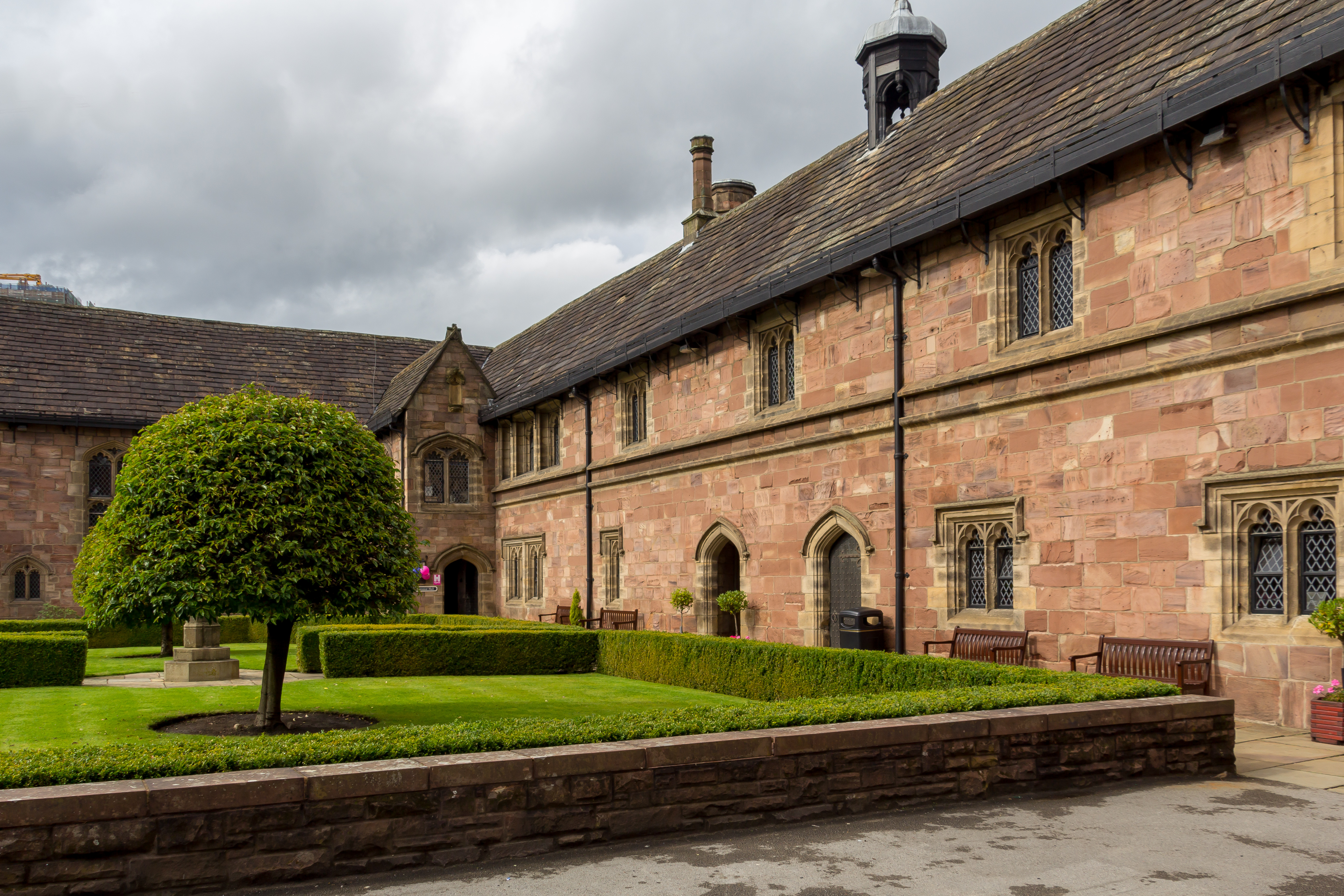
Chetham's Library, Manchester, United Kingdom

Another early library that allowed access to the public was Kalendars or Kalendaries, a brotherhood of clergy and laity who were attached to the Church of All-Halloween or All Saints in Bristol, England. Records show that in 1464, provision was made for a library to be erected in the house of the Kalendars. A reference is made to a deed of that date by which it was "appointed that all who wish to enter for the sake of instruction shall have 'free access and recess' at certain times."

In 1598, Francis Trigge established a library in a room above St. Wulfram's Church in Grantham, Lincolnshire and decreed that it should be open to the clergy and residents of the surrounding neighborhood. Some scholars consider this library an "ancestor" to public libraries since its patrons did not need to belong to an existing organization like a church or college to use it. However, all the books in the library were chained to stalls, hence its name: the Francis Trigge Chained Library.

In the early years of the 17th century, many famous collegiate and town libraries were founded in England. Norwich City library was established in 1608 (six years after Thomas Bodley founded the Bodleian Library, which was open to the "whole republic of the learned") and Chetham's Library in Manchester, which claims to be the oldest public library in the English-speaking world, opened in 1653.

Biblioteca Palafoxiana in Puebla City, Mexico (founded 1646)

Biblioteca Palafoxiana, a 17th‑century baroque library in Puebla, Mexico, is considered the first public library in the Americas and recognized by UNESCO's Memory of the World Register. Founded in 1646 by Bishop Juan de Palafox y Mendoza, it began with his donation of 5,000 books to be accessible to all. The current hall, completed in 1773, now preserves over 41,000–45,000 volumes and manuscripts from the 15th to 20th centuries, including incunabula like the 1493 Nuremberg Chronicle, the oldest text in the library.

In his seminal work Advis pour dresser une bibliothèque (1644) the French scholar and librarian Gabriel Naudé asserted that only three libraries in all Europe granted in his times regular access to every scholar, namely the Biblioteca Ambrosiana in Milan, the Biblioteca Angelica in Rome, and the Bodleian Library in Oxford.

=== Enlightenment-era libraries ===
At the start of the 18th century, libraries were becoming increasingly public and were more frequently lending libraries. The 18th century saw the switch from closed parochial libraries to lending libraries. Before this time, public libraries were parochial in nature, and libraries frequently chained their books to desks. Libraries also were not uniformly open to the public.

In Britain, Chetham's Library, established in Manchester in 1653, was the only important library that was fully and freely accessible to the public. In 1715 a small theological library was founded for general use at St Peter's Church, Liverpool, although an inventory of the church's goods taken in 1893 recorded that the library's existence was not widely known amongst Liverpool people and that there was a misconception amongst parishioners that it was for the exclusive use of the clergy. The Chesshyre Library in Halton, Cheshire, was founded as a free public library in 1733 for all "divines of the Church of England or other gentlemen or persons of letters", but it was limited to just 422 volumes of mostly ecclesiastical and legal works.

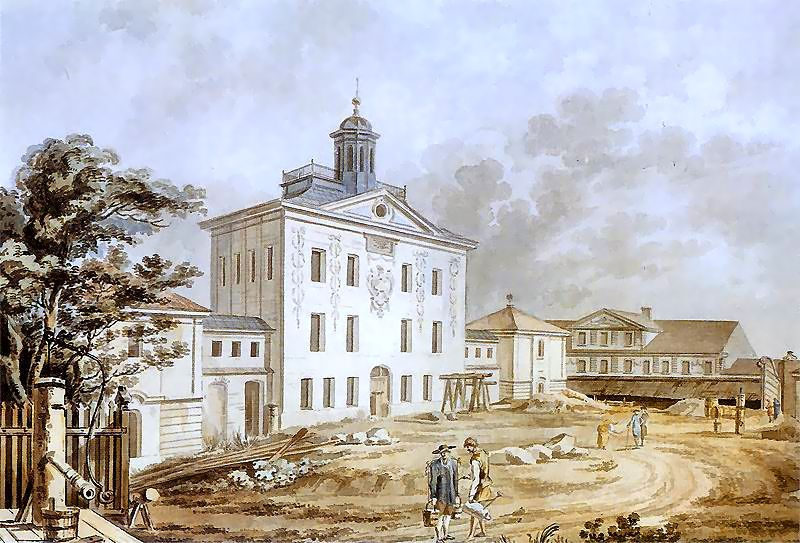
Biblioteka Załuskich, built in Warsaw in the mid-18th century

In Germany, there was another occurrence of an accessible public library. The Ducal Library at Wolfenbüttel was open "every weekday morning and afternoon" and loaned its books to the public. Between 1714 and 1799, the library loaned 31,485 books to 1,648 different users. Claude Sallier, the French philologist and churchman, operated an early form of a public library in the town of Saulieu, France, from 1737 to 1750. He wished to make culture and learning accessible to all people. The Załuski Library (Polish: Biblioteka Załuskich, Latin: Bibliotheca Zalusciana) was built in Warsaw 1747–1795 by Józef Andrzej Załuski and his brother, Andrzej Stanisław Załuski, both Roman Catholic bishops. The library was open to the public and was the first Polish public library, the biggest in Poland, and one of the earliest public libraries in Europe.

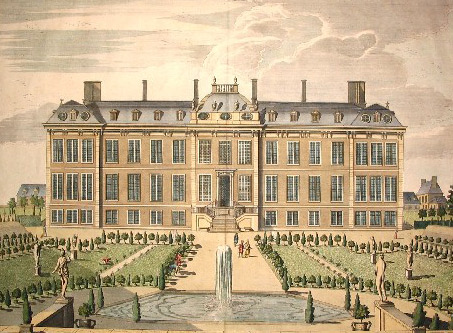
The British Museum was established in 1753 and had a library containing over 50,000 books.

The British Museum, founded in 1753, contained over 50,000 books, but the national library was not open to the public or even to most of the population. Access to the museum depended on passes, for which there was sometimes a waiting period of three to four weeks. Moreover, the library was not open for browsing. Once a pass to the library had been issued, the reader was taken on a tour of the library. Many readers complained that the tour was much too short. Similarly, the Bibliothèque du Roi in Paris required a potential visitor to be "carefully screened" and, even after this stipulation was met, the library was open only two days per week and only to view medallions and engravings, not books.

=== Subscription libraries ===
==== Commercial subscription libraries ====
The increase in secular literature at this time encouraged the spread of lending libraries, especially commercial subscription libraries. Commercial subscription libraries began when booksellers began renting out extra copies of books in the mid-18th century. Steven Fischer estimates that in 1790, there were "about six hundred rental and lending libraries, with a clientele of some fifty thousand." The mid-to-late 18th century saw a wave of feminine reading as novels became more and more popular. Novels, while frowned upon in society, were extremely popular. In England, there were many who lamented at the "villainous profane and obscene books", and the opposition to the circulating library, on moral grounds, persisted well into the 19th century. Still, many establishments must have circulated many times the number of novels as of any other genre.

In 1797, Thomas Wilson wrote in The Use of Circulating Libraries: "Consider that for a successful circulating library, the collection must contain 70% fiction". However, the overall percentage of novels mainly depended on the proprietor of the circulating library. While some circulating libraries were almost completely novels, others had less than 10% of their overall collection in the form of novels. The national average start of the 20th century hovered around novels comprising about 20% of the total collection. Novels varied from other types of books in many ways. They were read primarily for enjoyment instead of for study. They did not provide academic knowledge or spiritual guidance; thus, they were read quickly and far fewer times than other books. These were the perfect books for commercial subscription libraries to lend. Since books were read for pure enjoyment rather than for scholarly work, books needed to become both cheaper and smaller. Small duodecimo editions of books were preferred to the large folio editions. Folio editions were read at a desk, while the small duodecimo editions could be easily read like the paperbacks of today. The French journalist Louis-Sébastien Mercier wrote that the books were also separated into parts so that readers could rent a section of the book for some hours instead of a full day. This allowed more readers could have access to the same work at the same time, making it more profitable for the circulating libraries.

Much like paperbacks of today, many of the novels in circulating libraries were unbound. At this period of time, many people chose to bind their books in leather. Many circulating libraries skipped this process. Circulating libraries were not in the business of preserving books; their owners wanted to lend books as many times as they possibly could. Circulating libraries have ushered in a completely new way of reading. Reading was no longer simply an academic pursuit or an attempt to gain spiritual guidance. Reading became a social activity. Many circulating libraries were attached to the shops of milliners or drapers. They served as much for social gossip and the meeting of friends as coffee shops do today.

Another factor in the growth of subscription libraries was the increasing cost of books. In the last two decades of the century, especially, prices were practically doubled, so that a quarto work cost a guinea, an octavo 10 shillings or 12 shillings, and a duodecimo cost 4 shillings per volume. Price apart, moreover, books were difficult to procure outside London since local booksellers could not afford to carry large stocks. Commercial libraries, since they were usually associated with booksellers and also since they had a greater number of patrons, were able to accumulate greater numbers of books. The United Public Library was said to have a collection of some 52,000 volumes – twice as many as any private-subscription library in the country at that period. These libraries, since they functioned as a business, also lent books to non-subscribers on a per-book system.

Despite the existence of these subscription libraries, they were only accessible to those who could afford the fees and to those with time to read during the daylight. As stated by James Van Horn Melton, "one should not overstate the extent to which lending libraries 'democratized' reading" since "they were probably less important for creating new readers than for enabling those who already read to read more." For many people, these libraries, though more accessible than libraries such as the British Library, were still largely an institution for the middle and upper classes.

==== Private-subscription libraries ====
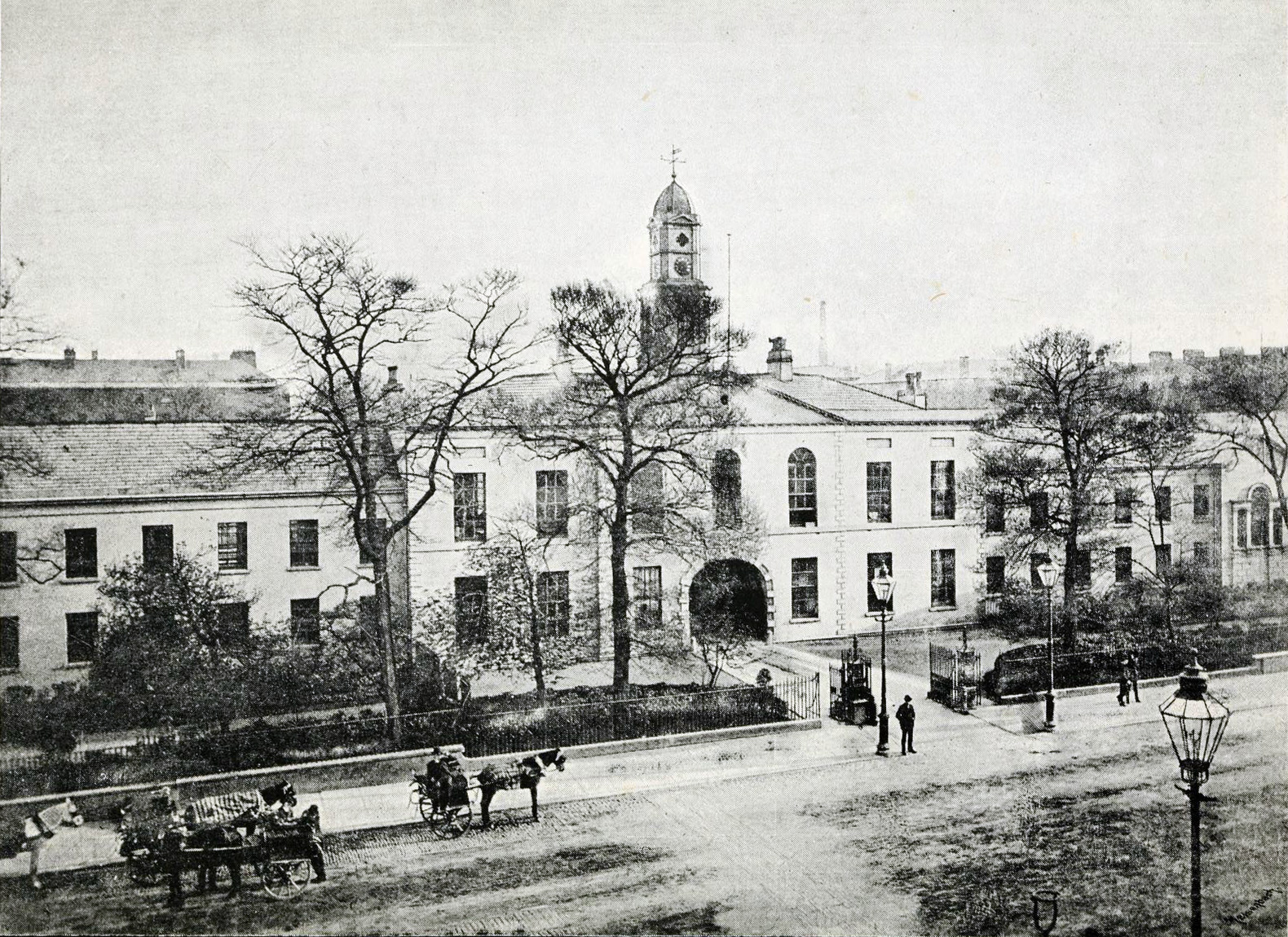
The Linen Hall Library was an 18th-century subscription library. Pictured in 1888, shortly before its demolition.

Private-subscription libraries functioned in much the same manner as commercial subscription libraries, though they varied in many important ways. One of the most popular versions of the private-subscription library was the "gentlemen only" library. The gentlemen's subscription libraries, sometimes known as proprietary libraries, were nearly all organized on a common pattern. Membership was restricted to the proprietors or shareholders, and ranged from a dozen or two to between four and five hundred. The entrance fee, i.e. the purchase price of a share, was in early days usually a guinea, but rose sharply as the century advanced, often reaching four or five guineas during the French wars; the annual subscription, during the same period, rose from about six shillings to ten shillings or more. The book-stock was, by modern standards, small (Liverpool, with over 8,000 volumes in 1801, seems to have been the largest), and was accommodated, at the outset, in makeshift premises—very often over a bookshop, with the bookseller acting as librarian and receiving an honorarium for his pains.

The Liverpool subscription library was a gentlemen-only library founded in 1758 and established as a private club in 1798 named The Athenaeum when it was rebuilt with a newsroom and coffeehouse. It had an entrance fee of one guinea and annual subscription of five shillings. An analysis of the registers for the first twelve years provides glimpses of middle-class reading habits in a mercantile community at this period. The largest and most popular sections of the library were History, Antiquities, and Geography, with 283 titles and 6,121 borrowings, and Belles Lettres, with 238 titles and 3,313 borrowings. The most popular single work was John Hawkesworth's Account of Voyages ... in the Southern Hemisphere (3 vols) which was borrowed on 201 occasions. The records also show that in 1796, membership had risen by 1/3 to 198 subscribers (of whom 5 were women) and the titles increased five-fold to 4,987. This mirrors the increase in reading interests. A patron list from the Bath Municipal Library shows that from 1793 to 1799, the library held a stable 30% of their patrons as female.

It was also uncommon for these libraries to have buildings designated solely as the library building during the 1790s, though in the 19th century, many libraries would begin building elaborate permanent residences. Bristol, Birmingham, and Liverpool were the few libraries with their own building. The accommodations varied from the shelf for a few dozen volumes in the country stationer's or draper's shop, to the expansion to a back room, to the spacious elegant areas of Hookham's or those at the resorts like Scarborough, and four in a row at Margate.

Private-subscription libraries held a greater amount of control over both membership and the types of books in the library. There was almost a complete elimination of cheap fiction in the private societies. Subscription libraries prided themselves on respectability. The highest percentage of subscribers were often landed proprietors, gentry, and old professions.

Towards the end of the 18th century and in the first decades of the 19th century, the demand for books and general education made itself felt among social classes generated by the beginnings of the Industrial Revolution. The late-18th century saw a rise in subscription libraries intended for the use of tradesmen. In 1797, there was established at Kendal what was known as the Economical Library, "designed principally for the use and instruction of the working classes." There was also the Artizans' library established at Birmingham in 1799. The entrance fee was 3 shillings, and the subscription was 1 shilling 6 pence per quarter. This was a library of general literature. Novels, at first excluded, were afterwards admitted on condition that they did not account for more than one-tenth of the annual income.

=== 19th–20th centuries ===
==== United Kingdom ====
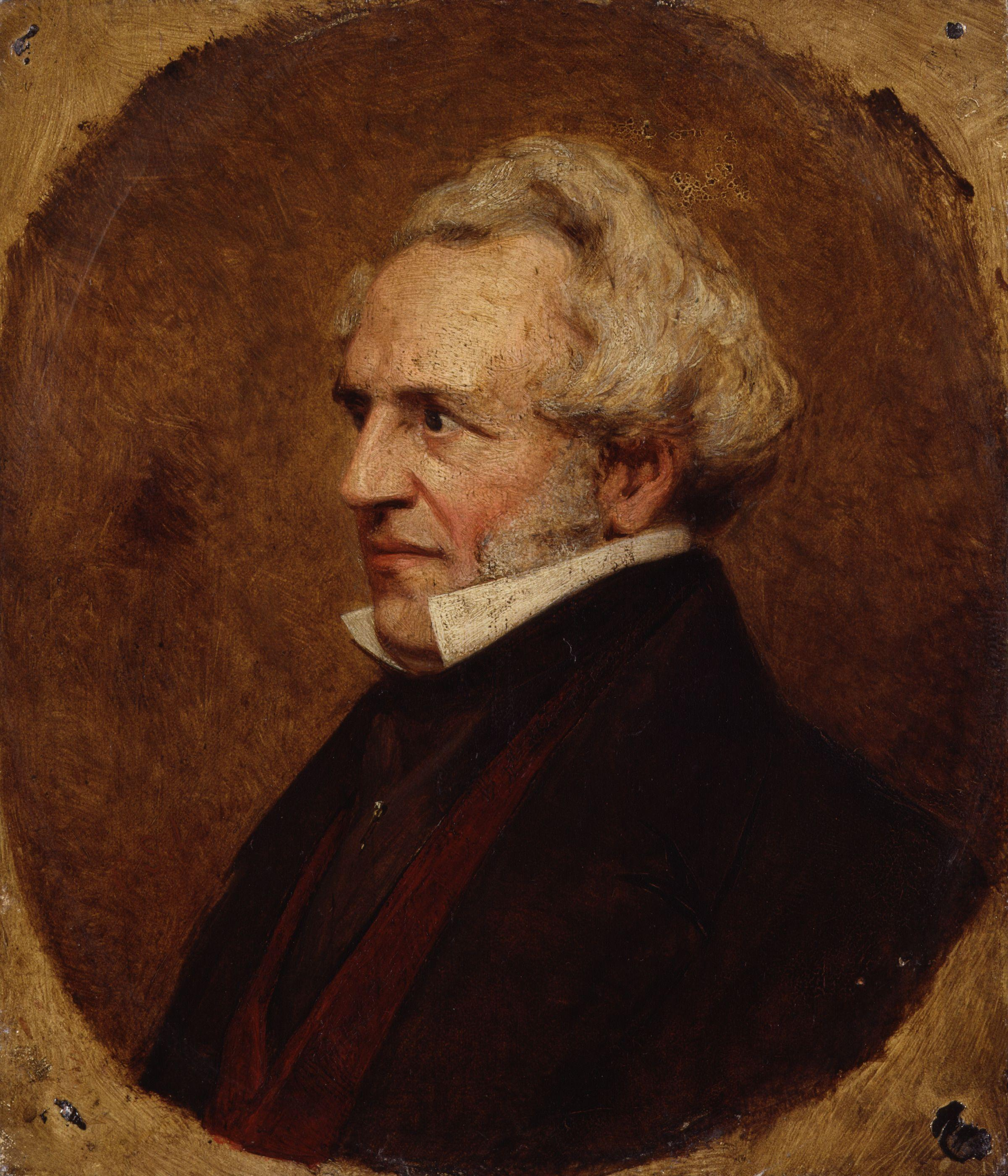
James Silk Buckingham led the campaign for public libraries in the mid-19th century.

In 1835, and against government opposition, James Silk Buckingham, MP for Sheffield and a supporter of the temperance movement, was able to secure the Chair of the select committee which would examine "the extent, causes, and consequences of the prevailing vice of intoxication among the labouring classes of the United Kingdom" and propose solutions. Francis Place, a campaigner for the working class, agreed that "the establishment of parish libraries and district reading rooms, and popular lectures on subjects both entertaining and instructive to the community might draw off a number of those who now frequent public houses for the sole enjoyment they afford." Buckingham introduced to Parliament a Public Institution Bill allowing boroughs to charge a tax to set up libraries and museums, the first of its kind. Although this did not become law, it had a major influence on William Ewart MP and Joseph Brotherton MP, who introduced a bill which would "[empower] boroughs with a population of 10,000 or more to raise a ½d for the establishment of museums." This became the Museums Act 1845.

The advocacy of Ewart and Brotherton then succeeded in having a select committee set up to consider public library provision. The Report argued that the provision of public libraries would steer people towards temperate and moderate habits. With a view to maximising the potential of current facilities, the committee made two significant recommendations. They suggested that the government should issue grants to aid the foundation of libraries and that the Museums Act 1845 should be amended and extended to allow for a tax to be levied for the establishment of public libraries.

Objections were raised about the increase in taxation, the potential infringement on private enterprise and the existing library provision such as mechanics' institutes and the fear that it would give rise to "unhealthy social agitation". The bill passed through Parliament as most MPs felt that public libraries would provide facilities for self-improvement through books and reading for all classes, and that the greater levels of education attained by providing public libraries would result in lower crime rates.

Under the terms of the Museums Act 1845, the municipalities of Warrington and Salford established libraries in their museums. Warrington Municipal Library opened in 1848.

Although by the mid-19th century, England could claim 274 subscription libraries and Scotland, 266, the foundation of the modern public library system in Britain is the Public Libraries Act 1850. The act first gave local boroughs the power to establish free public libraries and was the first legislative step toward the creation of an enduring national institution that provides universal free access to information and literature. In the 1830s, at the height of the Chartist movement, there was a general tendency towards reformism in the United Kingdom. The middle classes were concerned that the workers' free time was not being well-spent. This was prompted more by Victorian middle class paternalism than by demand from the lower social orders. Campaigners felt that encouraging the lower classes to spend their free time on morally uplifting activities, such as reading, would promote greater social good. Norwich lays claim to being the first municipality to adopt the Public Libraries Act 1850 (which allowed any municipal borough with a population of 100,000 or more to introduce a halfpenny rate to establish public libraries—although not to buy books); although it did not then establish a library until 1857.

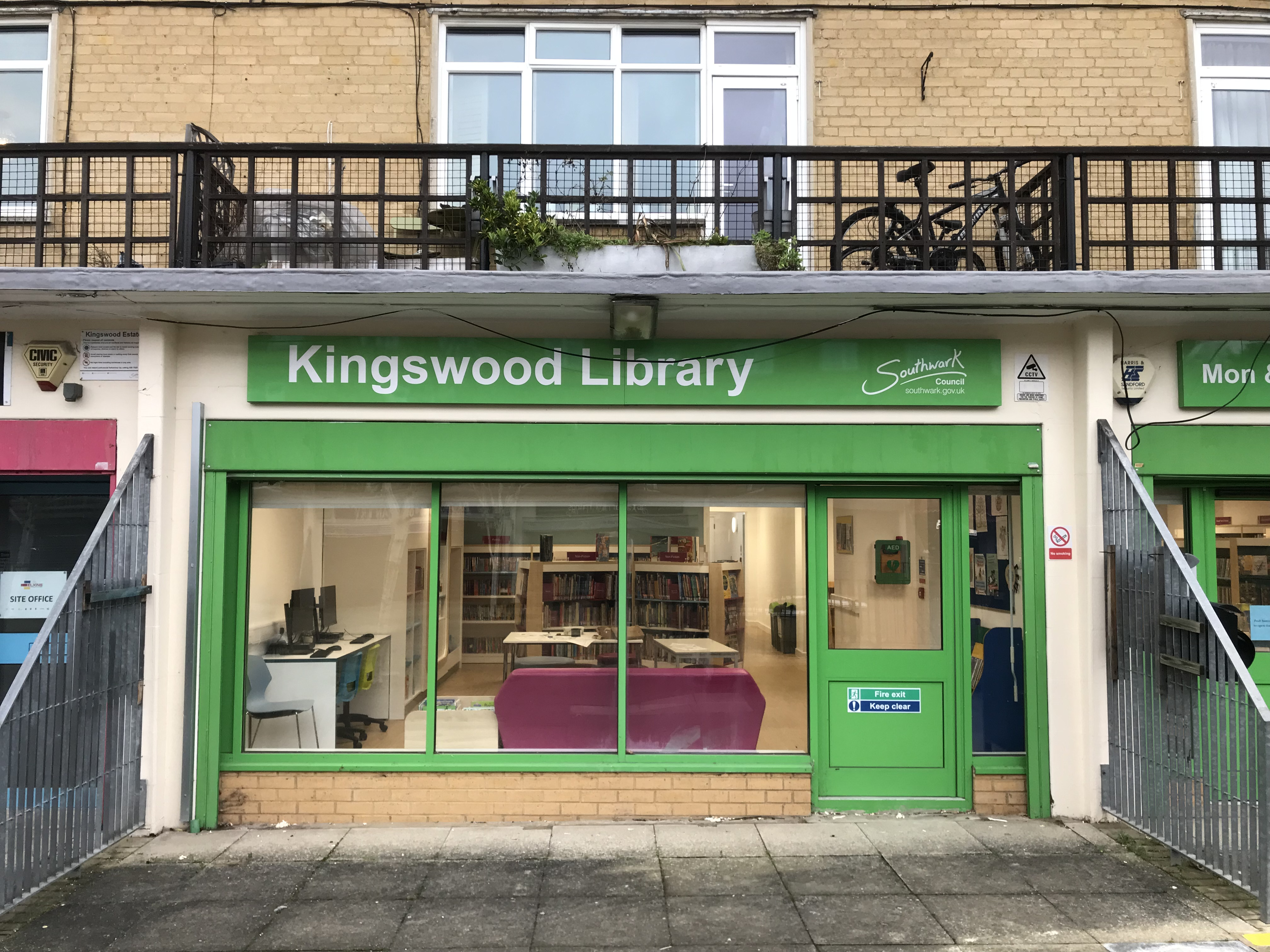
A modern library in the United Kingdom, located on Kingswood Estate, Southwark, 2025

In 1848, Warrington opened a museum and library under the terms of the Museums Act 1845: it was the first rate-supported library in the UK. Salford Museum and Art Gallery first opened in November 1850 as "The Royal Museum & Public Library", the first unconditionally free public library in England. Early public libraries established under the 1850 Act were Winchester (1851), Manchester (1852), Bolton (1853), and Oxford (1854), followed by Liverpool, Kidderminster, Cambridge, Birkenhead and Sheffield. The library opened in Campfield, Manchester, in 1842 was the first library to operate a "free" lending library without subscription. Salford's library, which had opened two years earlier, began as a reference library, before it likewise began to offer a lending service in 1854.

The Public Libraries Act 1850 was noteworthy because it established the principle of free public libraries. In 1866, an amending act, the Public Libraries Amendment Act 1866 (29 & 30 Vict. c. 114) was passed, which eliminated the population limit for the establishment of a library and replaced the two-thirds majority previously required for adoption with a simple majority. It also allowed neighbouring parishes to combine with an existing or potential library authority. Despite the rise in the level of tax public libraries could levy, it was still very difficult for boroughs to raise enough capital to fund new libraries. The growth of the public library movement in the wake of the 1850 act relied heavily on the donations of philanthropists.

County libraries were a later development, which were made possible by the establishment of county councils in 1888. They normally have a large central library in a major town with smaller branch libraries in other towns and a mobile library service covering rural areas.

The Public Libraries Act 1964 required local authorities to provide a "comprehensive and efficient" library service. Public libraries built in the 1960s were characterized by modernism.

==== United States ====
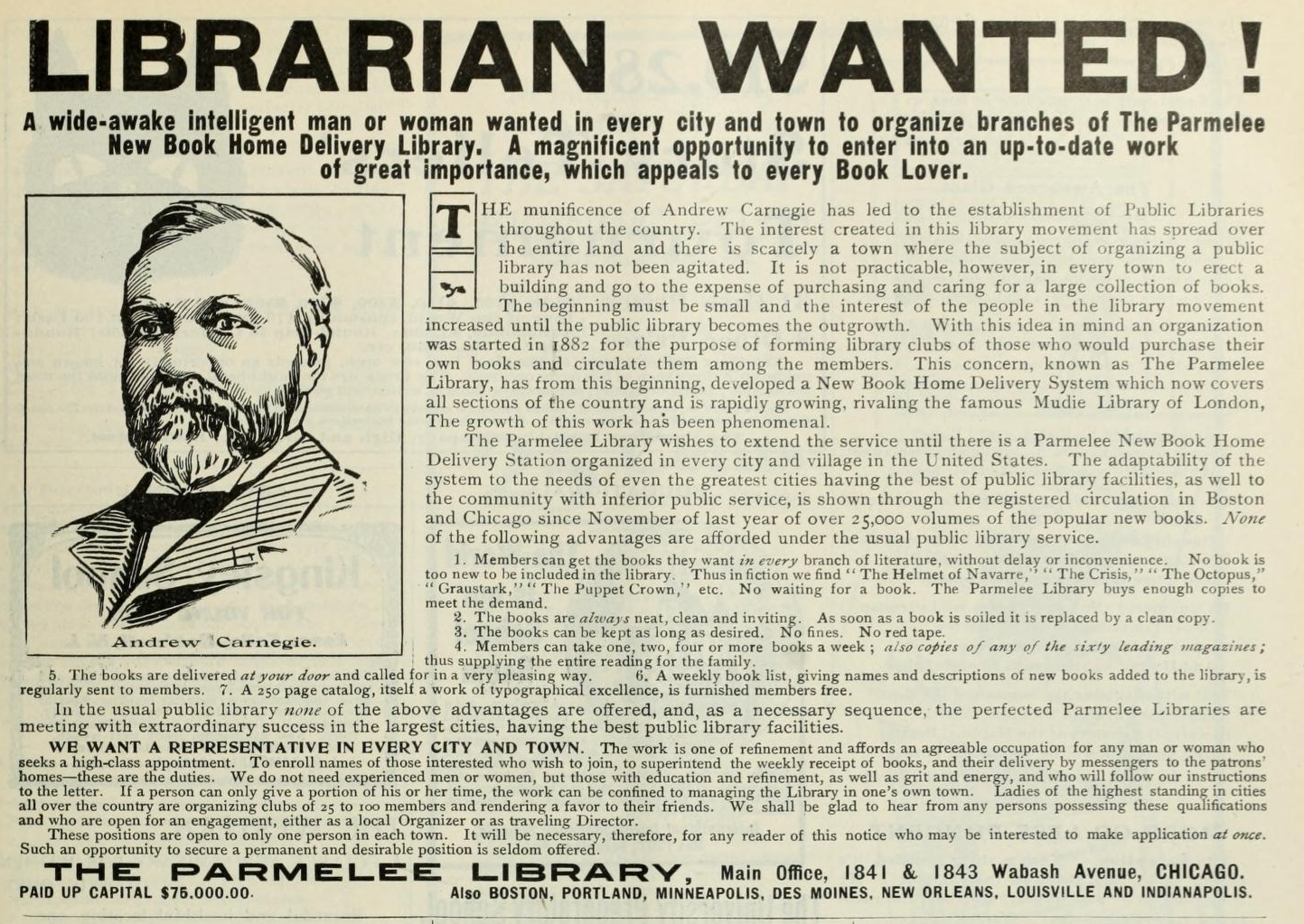
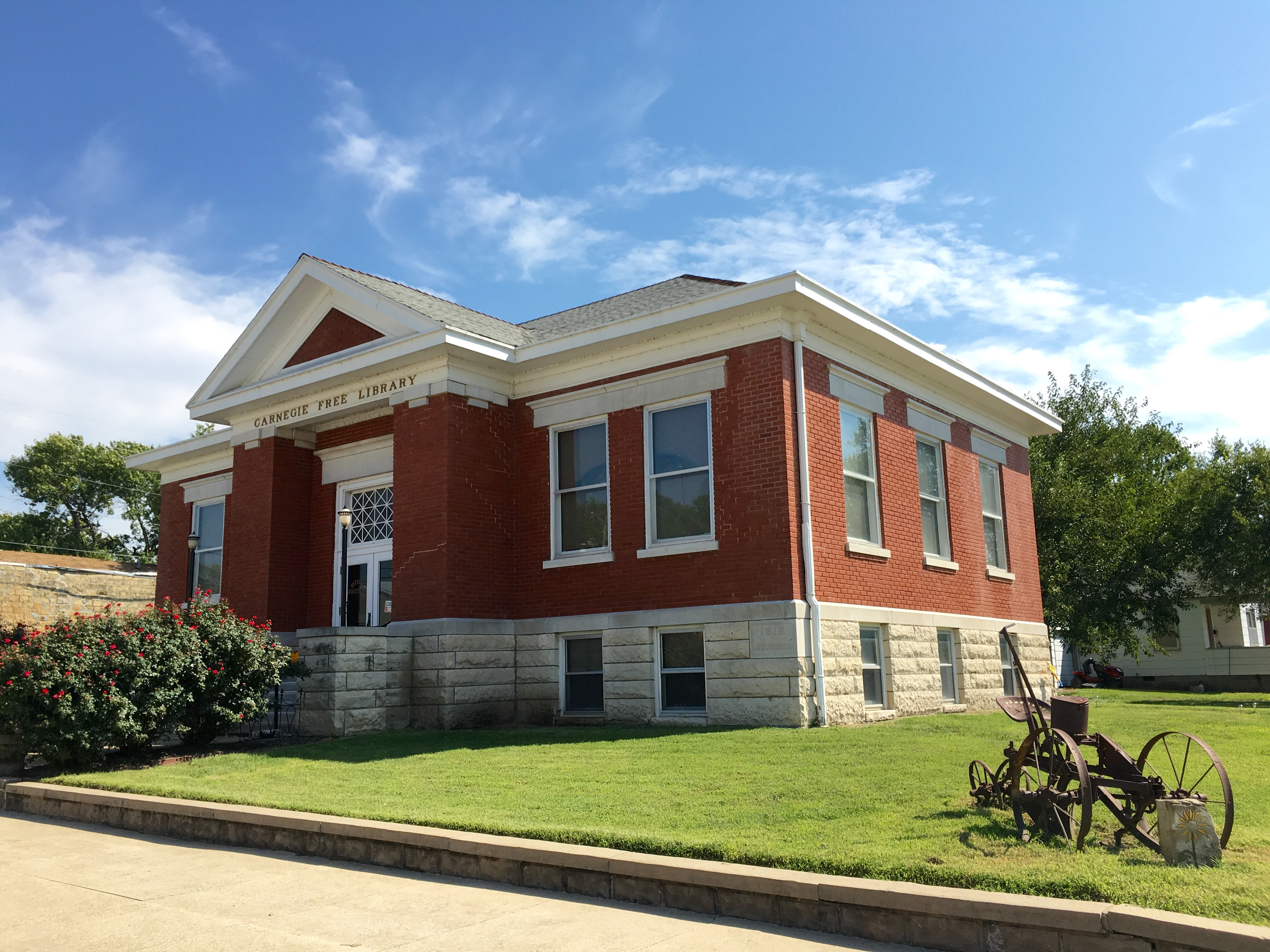
Left: Andrew Carnegie illustration in ad for librarian, 1893; Right: Carnegie Free Library in Burlington, Kansas

The modern public library grew at a great pace at the end of the 19th century, especially in the English-speaking world. Philanthropists and businessmen, including John Passmore Edwards, Henry Tate and Andrew Carnegie, helped to fund the establishment of large numbers of public libraries for the edification of the masses.

Public libraries in North America developed from the 18th century to today; as the country grew more populous and wealthier, factors such as a push for education and desire to share knowledge led to broad public support for free libraries. In addition, money donations by private philanthropists provided the seed capital to get many libraries started. In some instances, collectors donated large book collections.

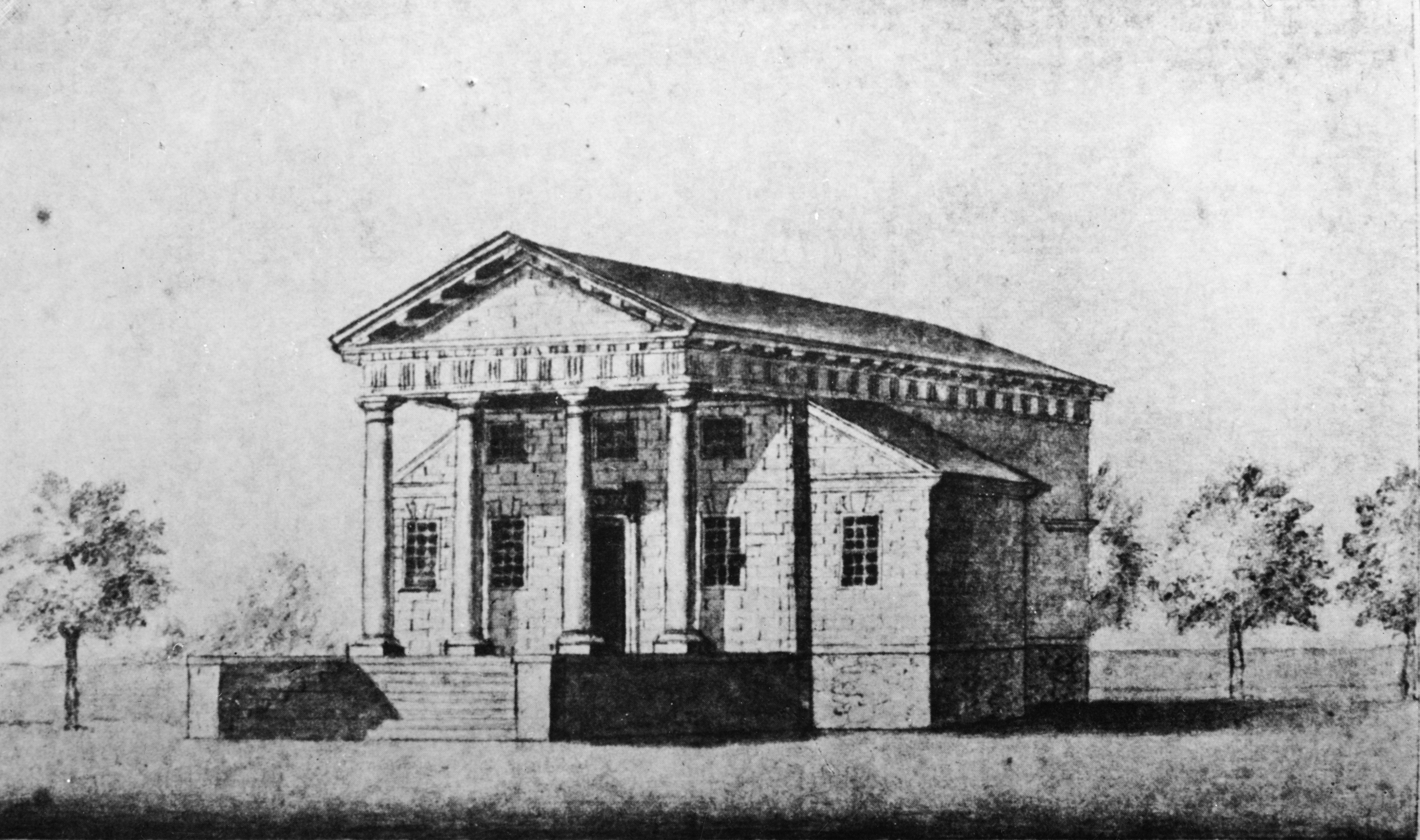
Illustration of Redwood Library and Athenaeum in 1768

The first public lending library still in operation in the US is the Franklin Public Library which began with no building and just over 100 books donated by Benjamin Franklin after they named their town after him. The first modern public library in the world supported by taxes was the Peterborough Town Library in Peterborough, New Hampshire, established in 1833. The first large public library supported by taxes in the United States was the Boston Public Library, established in 1848 and first opened its doors to the public in 1854.

The Redwood Library and Athenaeum was founded in 1747 by a group led by Abraham Redwood. It was the first library in Rhode Island and the oldest lending library in America. Over half of its volumes were lost when it was used as the British Officers Club during the Revolutionary War. An effort was made to replace the original collection. Over 90% of the volumes lost were returned. The library is still in use.

A total of 1,689 Carnegie libraries were built in the United States between 1883 and 1929, including some belonging to universities. By 1930, half the American public libraries had been built by Carnegie.

Federal library legislation supporting public libraries has been a focus of the American Library Association, Washington Office.

Democracy within the life of libraries in the 20th and 21st century has been explored in the essay, "Libraries, Democracy, and Citizenship: Twenty Years after 9/11".

==== Other countries ====
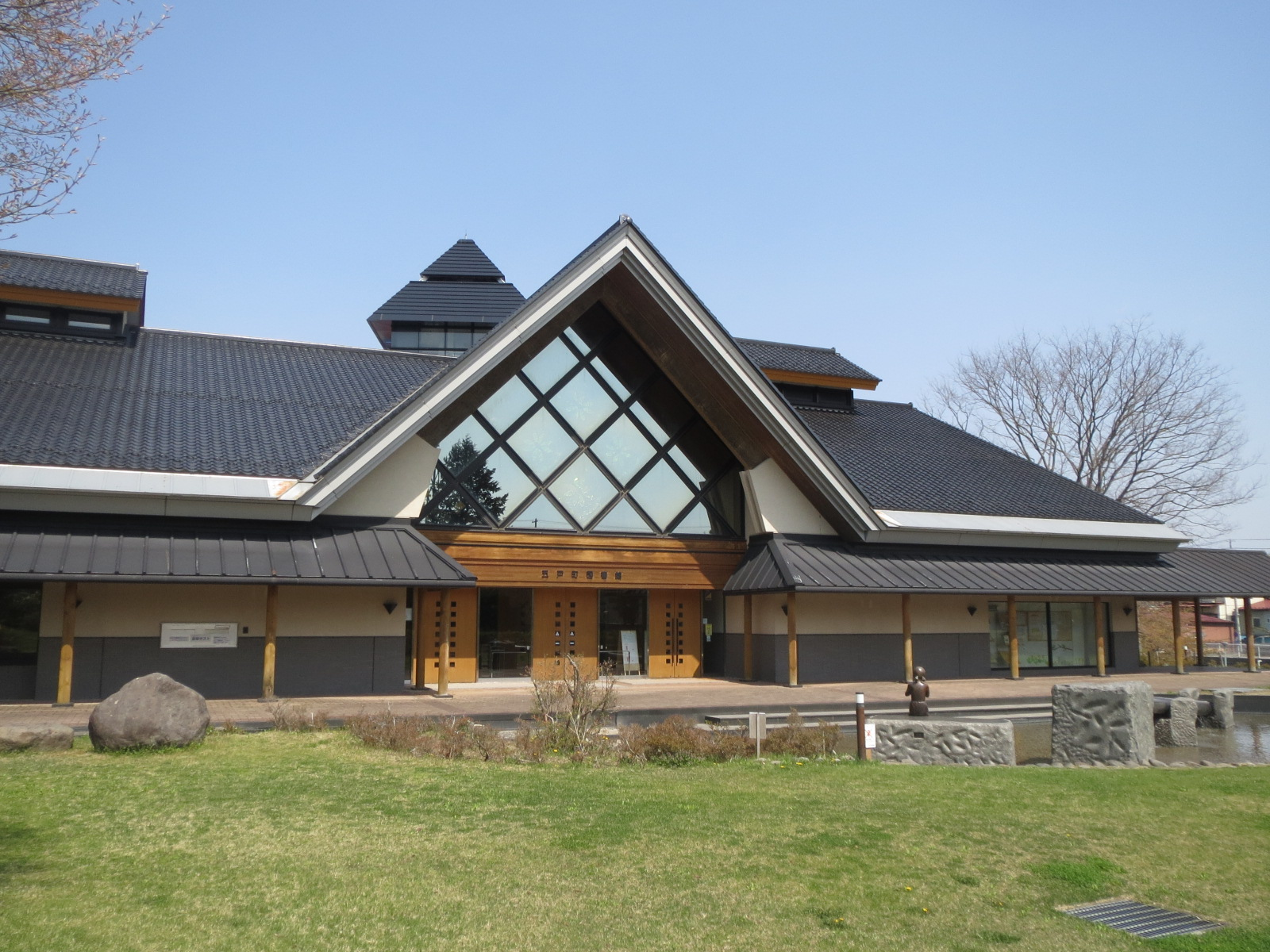
Library in the rural town of Gonohe, Aomori, Japan

The first public library in Australia was the Melbourne Public Library (now the State Library of Victoria), which opened in 1856, just a few years after their introduction into Britain. This was however purely a reference library. In September 1869, the New South Wales (NSW) government opened as the Free Public Library, Sydney (now the State Library of New South Wales) by purchasing a bankrupt subscription library. In 1896, the Brisbane Public Library was established. The library's collection, purchased by the Queensland Government from the private collection of Justice Harding. In 1935 the free library movement was established in New South Wales advocating for free public libraries to be supported by municipal authorities. A similar movement was established in Victoria within a couple of years.

New Zealand was, by the third quarter of the nineteenth century, a veritable paradise for readers, with the formation of public libraries following closely on the heels of the settlers as they spread across the country.

— J. E. Traue

Pre-Independence libraries in India have been discussed by R. K. Bhatt and K. Kandhasamy.

Eugène Morel, a writer and one of the librarians at the Bibliothèque nationale, pioneered modern public libraries in France. He put forward his ideas in the 1910 book La Librairie publique.

Mexican public libraries trace their origins to convent and monastery libraries in the sixteenth century, but the first modern public library dates from 1758 when the Biblioteca Turriana—named after its founder and donors, the three cathedral canons Luis Antonio Torres Quintero, Cayetano Antonio de Torres Tuñón, and Luis Antonio de Torres Tuñón—was established at the Mexico City Metropolitan Cathedral. Liberal governments seized its holdings in 1867 to establish the National Library.

Japanese public libraries greatly expanded in the 1950s with the Library Law.

== Services ==
=== Book borrowing and lending ===
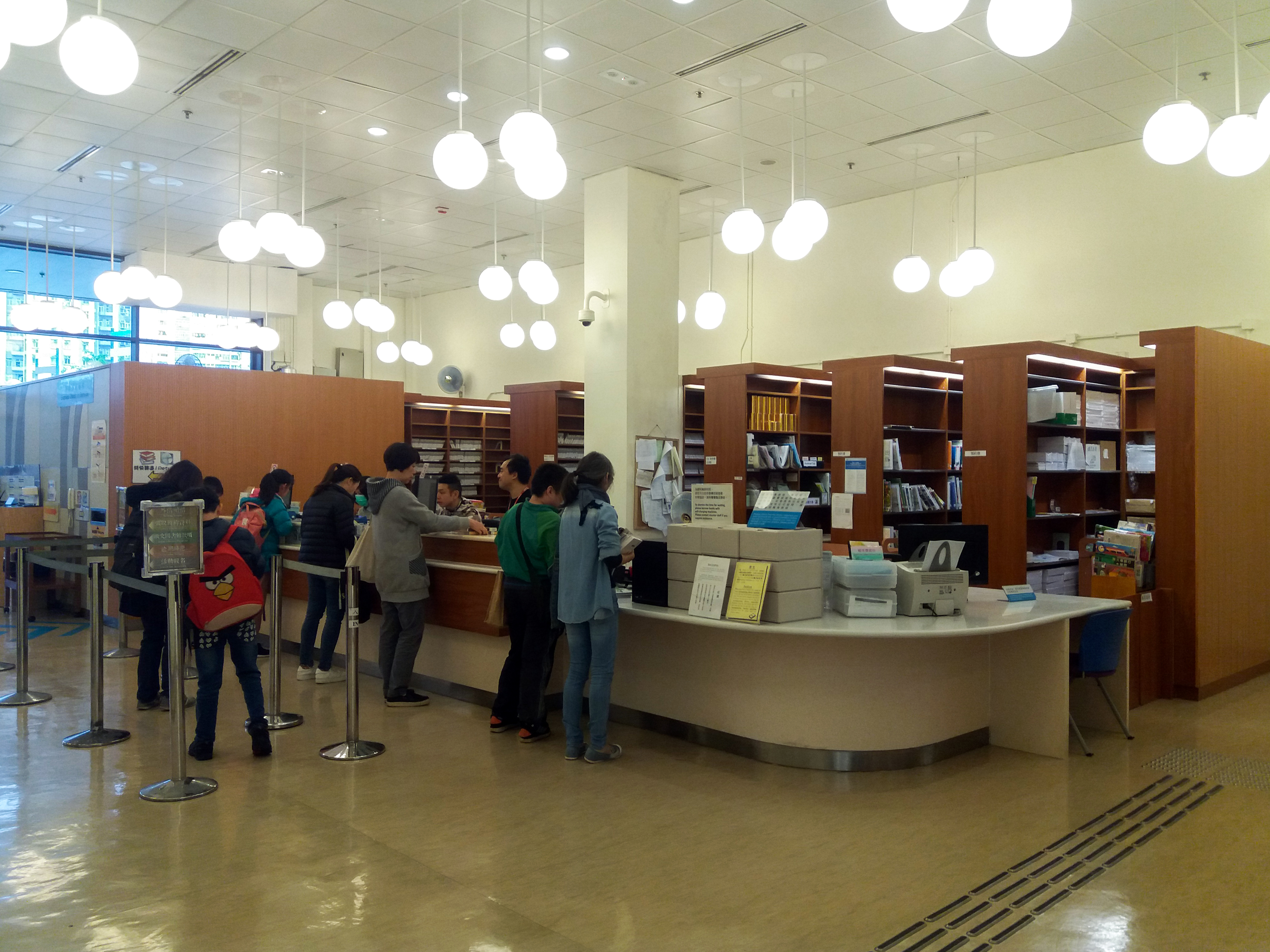
Library patrons checking out books, Tuen Mun Public Library in Hong Kong

The main task of public libraries is to provide the public with access to books and periodicals. The American Library Association (ALA), addresses this role of libraries as part of "access to information" and "equity of access"; part of the profession's ethical commitment that "no one should be denied information because he or she cannot afford the cost of a book or periodical, have access to the internet or information in any of its various formats."

Libraries typically offer access to thousands, tens of thousands, or even millions of books, the majority of which are available for borrowing by anyone with the appropriate library card. A library's selection of books is called its collection, and usually includes a range of popular fiction, classics, nonfiction and reference works, books of public interest or under public discussion, and subscriptions to popular newspapers and magazines. Most libraries offer quiet space for reading, known as reading rooms. Borrowers may also take books home, as long as they return them at a certain time and in good condition. If a borrowed book is returned late, the library may charge a small library fine, though some libraries have eliminated fines in recent years. About two-thirds of libraries now provide access to e-books and digital or digitized periodicals as well as printed books. BiblioLED, a Portuguese public library only for digital reading and borrowing, launched in January 2025, is accessible 24 hours a day, seven days a week. Many libraries offer assistance to borrowers, to select books, through specialist Readers' Advisory Services librarians.

Public libraries also provide books and other materials for children. These items are often housed in a special section known as a children's library and attended to by a specialized children's librarian. Child oriented websites with on-line educational games and programs specifically designed for younger library users are becoming increasingly popular. Services may be provided for other groups, such as large print or braille materials, books on tape, young adult literature and other materials for teenagers, or materials in other than the national language (in foreign languages).

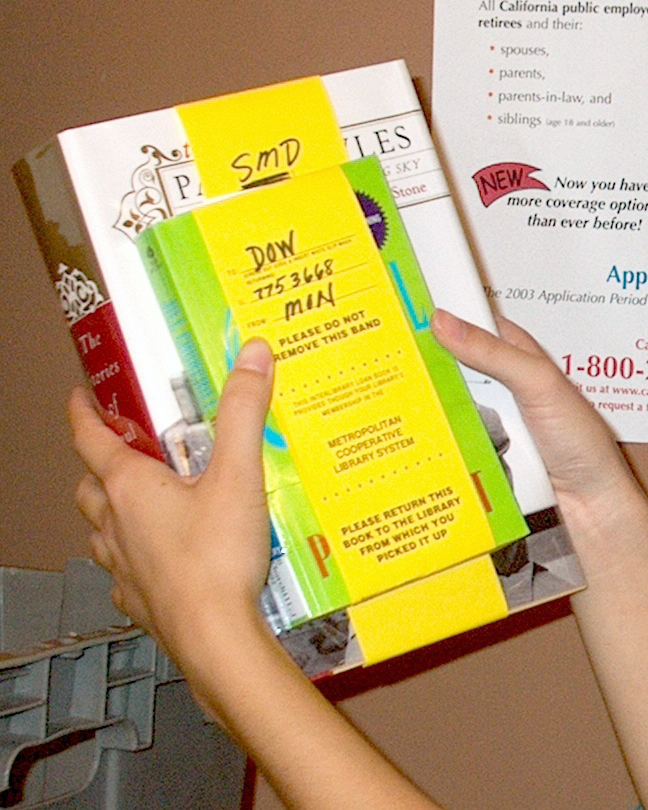
Books marked for interlibrary loan

Libraries also lend books to each other, a practice known as interlibrary loan. Interlibrary loan allows libraries to provide patrons access to the collections of other libraries, especially rare, infrequently used, specialized and/or out-of-print books. Libraries within the same system, such as a county system, may lend their books to each other, or libraries in different states may even use an interlibrary loan system.

The selection, purchase and cataloging of books for a collection; the care, repair, and weeding of books; the organization of books in the library; readers' advisory; and the management of membership, borrowing and lending are typical tasks for a public librarian, an information professional with graduate-level education or experience in library and information science.

==== Privacy ====
In the United States, libraries are responsible for supporting the First Amendment and how it relates to their facilities through policies such as the American Library Association's Library Bill of Rights. The right to freedom of speech and information is significant to public libraries; one way of upholding this doctrine is to protect the privacy of all patrons that belong to a library. The concept of confidentiality is important because the First Amendment may be violated if a patron's information could possibly be shared. Patrons may not feel free to check out certain materials for fear it would later be revealed. Members of society need to be reassured that even if they borrow controversial or embarrassing materials, their privacy will be upheld.

Some libraries require staff to talk about confidentiality or direct the patron to literature on the subject when creating a new library card for patrons.

=== Digital engagement ===
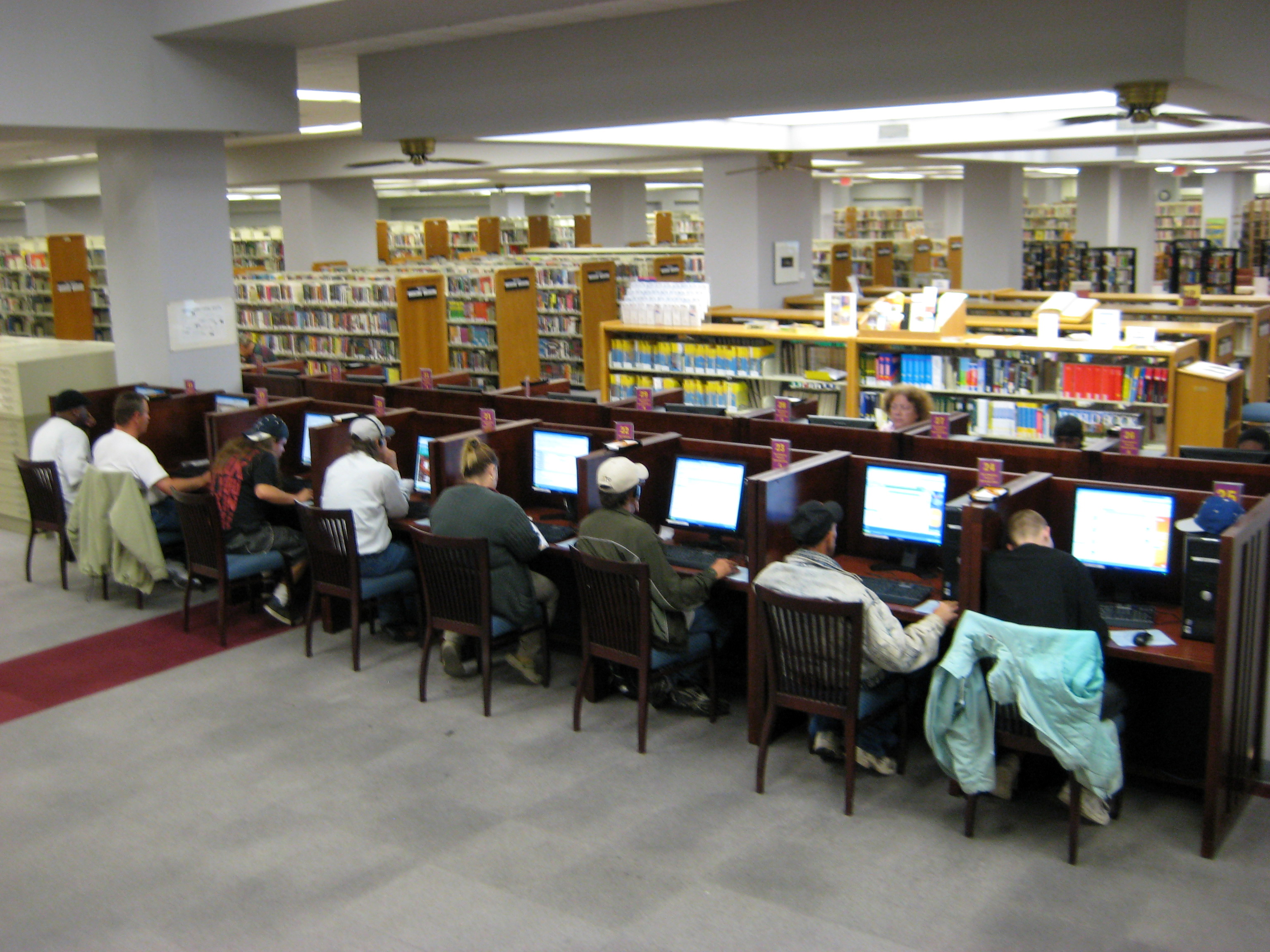
Fort Worth Central Library Computer Lab in Fort Worth, Texas

Part of the public library mission has become attempting to help bridge the digital divide. As more books, information resources, and government services are being provided online (see e-commerce and e-government), public libraries increasingly provide access to the Internet and public computers for users who otherwise would not be able to connect to these services. They can also provide community spaces to encourage the general population to improve their digital skills through Library Coding Clubs and Library makerspace. Almost all public libraries now house a computer lab. Internationally, public libraries offer information and communication technology (ICT) services, giving "access to information and knowledge" the "highest priority." While different countries and areas of the world have their own requirements, general services offered include free connection to the Internet, training in using the Internet, and relevant content in appropriate languages. In addition to typical public library financing, non-governmental organizations (NGOs) and business fund services that assist public libraries in combating the digital divide.

In addition to access, many public libraries offer training and support to computer users. Once access has been achieved, there remains a large gap in people's online abilities and skills. For many communities, the public library is the only agency offering free computer classes, information technology learning and an affordable, interactive way to build digital skills. As of 2012, 91% of libraries offer free wireless Internet to their patrons; 76% offer e-books for borrowing; and 90% offer formal or informal technology training. A significant service provided by public libraries is assisting people with e-government access and use of federal, state and local government information, forms and services.

In 2006, 73% percent of library branches reported that they are the only local provider of free public computer and Internet access. A 2008 study found that "100 percent of rural, high poverty outlets provide public Internet access." Access to computers and the Internet is now nearly as important to library patrons as access to books.

=== Classroom and meeting space ===
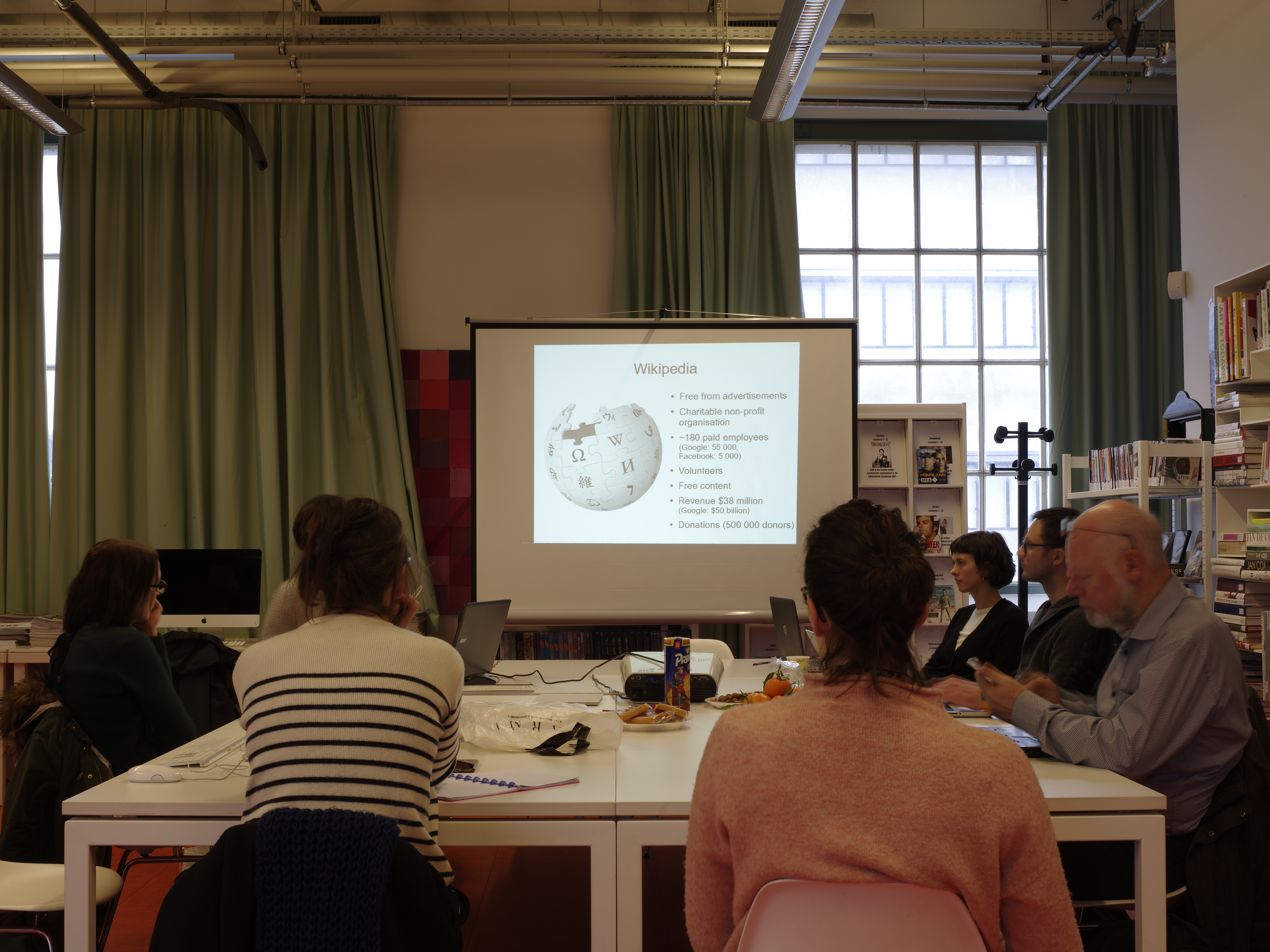
Wikipedia edit-a-thon at BLI:B, a public library in Brussels

Public libraries have a long history of functioning as community centers or public spaces for reading, study and formal and informal public meetings. In 1898, Andrew Carnegie, a prominent library philanthropist, built a library in Homestead, Pennsylvania, where his main steel mills were located. Besides a book collection, it included a bowling alley, an indoor swimming pool, basketball courts and other athletic facilities, a music hall, and numerous meeting rooms for local organizations. It sponsored highly successful semi-pro football and baseball teams. Even before the development of the modern public library, subscription libraries were often used as clubs or gathering places. They served as much for social gossip and the meeting of friends, as coffee shops do today. Throughout history, public libraries were touted as alternatives to dance halls or gentleman's clubs, and frequently built, organized and supported because of their equalizing and civilizing influence.

Today, in-person and on-line programs for reader development, language learning, homework help, free lectures and cultural performances, and other community service programs are common offerings. The library storytime, in which books are read aloud to children and infants, is a cultural touchstone. Most public libraries offer frequent storytimes, often daily or even several times a day for different age groups. Some libraries have begun offering sensory storytimes for children and adults on the autism spectrum. Sensory storytimes give patrons "more ways to process information", especially considering people on the autism spectrum are concrete thinkers and/or might have sensory issues to fluorescent lightning or ambient noise other patrons might not notice.

One of the most popular programs offered in public libraries is "summer reading" for children, families, and adults. Summer reading usually includes a list of books to read during summer holidays, as well as performances, book discussions or other celebrations of reading, culture and the humanities. Many libraries offer classes to the community such as tech clinics where patrons can bring in laptops and electronic devices and receive one on one attention in solving their problems and learning how to use them.

Libraries may also offer free or inexpensive meeting space for community organizations and educational and entrepreneurial activity. The addition of makerspaces in libraries (this is usually referred to as community outreach), beginning with the Fayetteville Free Library in 2011, offers the potential for new roles for public spaces and public libraries. Attendance at library programs increased by 22% between 2004 and 2008.

=== Programming ===
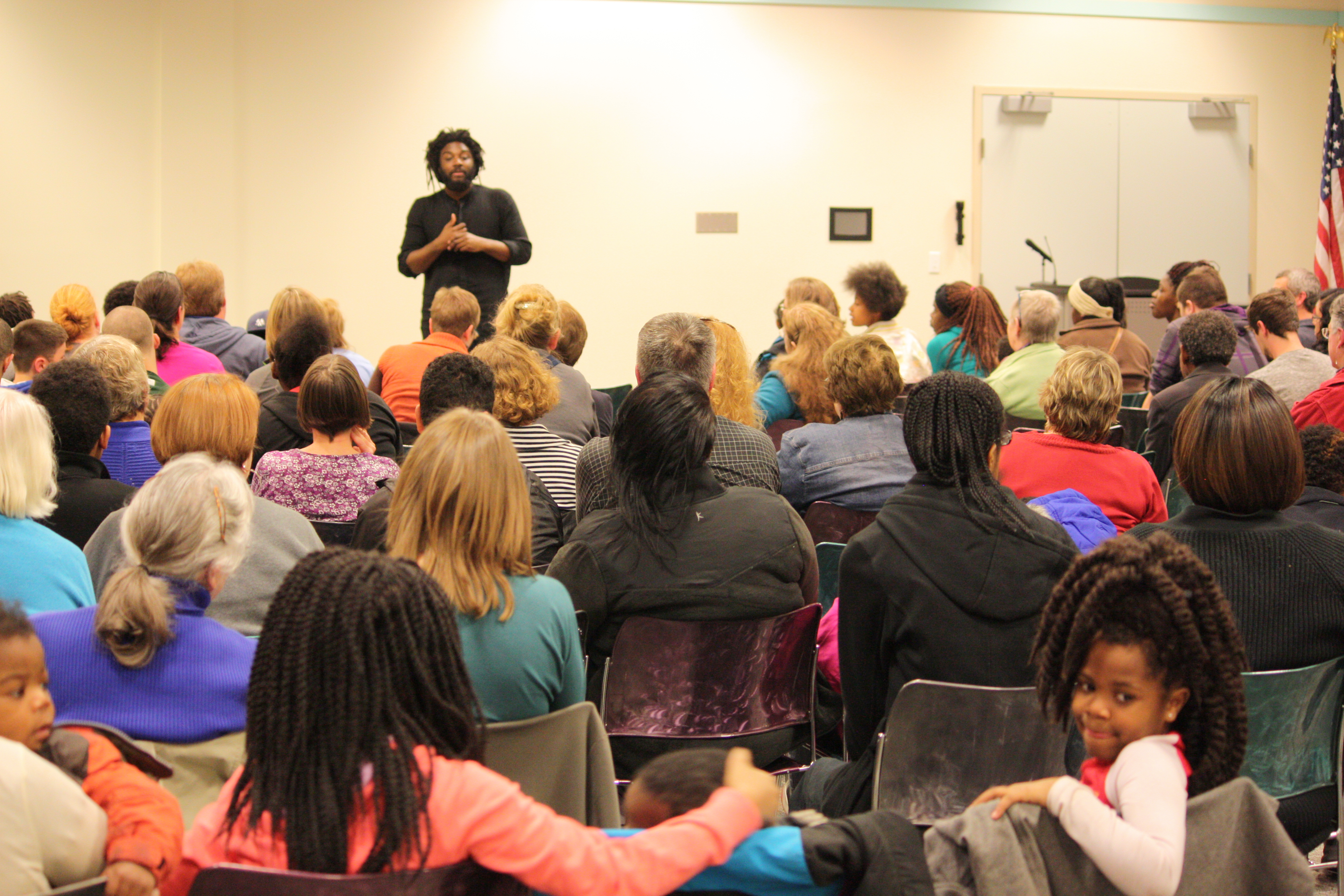
Author Jason Reynolds speaking at library event in Kalamazoo, Michigan

While in the past libraries were merely buildings to house their collections, most now utilize their space to offer programs or clubs regularly. Although some libraries will have similar programs with different names, such as book club, writing club or computer programs, most programs will differ based on the specific library and the community they serve. New studies have shown that librarians must research what their specific community needs, "because communities differ, however, the ways libraries implement these services differ as well. The [example of service response] offered at one library may vary significantly from [the same example] offered by another library. The differences are perfectly appropriate if they result from a tailoring of services to address local needs." Websites like Pinterest have numerous ideas for creating programs for local patrons, while the website Instructables has DIY tutorials, complete with pictures, which is helpful for libraries on a budget. "Programs in the humanities and the arts that encourage people to think and talk about ethics and values, history, art, poetry, and other cultures are integral to the library's mission."

==== Adult programs ====
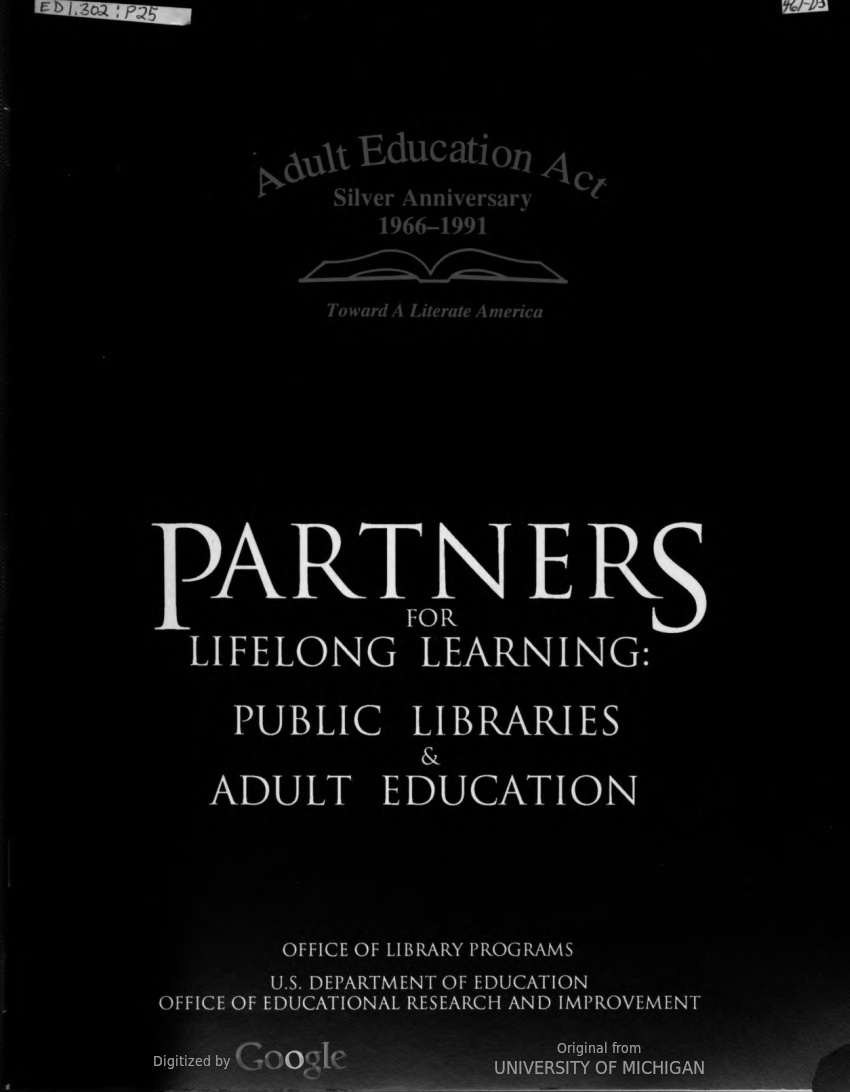
Public Libraries and the Adult Education Act. 25 years.

Adult library programming in the United States initially had strong ties to adult education and adult literacy. Margaret E. Monroe traced these connections on the 25th anniversary of the U.S. Adult Education Act which was part of the Economic Opportunity Act of 1964.

The American Library Association supported the "Adult Services in the Eighties" (ASE) project which replicated an earlier ALA 1952-53 survey, Adult Education Activities in Public Libraries by Helen Lyman Smith. The ASE project was conducted to provide planning for new directions for adult library services. Sources on the scope of adult services include "Where Would We Be without Them? Libraries and Adult Education Activities: 1966–91", "Twenty-First Century Public Library Adult Services", Adult Programs in the Library, and Designing Adult Services Strategies For Better Serving Your Community. A national study of public library service to older adults was conducted in 2015.

The New York Public Library offers over 93,000 programs to its patrons every year at its 87 different branches. Adult programs include Excel classes, writing club, adult coloring club, chess club, knitting club, and a jewelry making class.

The Albuquerque Bernalillo County Library has an adult coloring club, a crochet/knitting/sewing club, a gardening club, a bead and string class, and a bilingual computer class.

The Tampa–Hillsborough County Public Library System has 31 branches that offer the usual book clubs and writing clubs for adults. However, they also offer an early morning walking club, chair yoga classes, beginning computer classes, genealogy classes, walk-in tech help, and a coffee and French talk class.

==== Teen programs ====
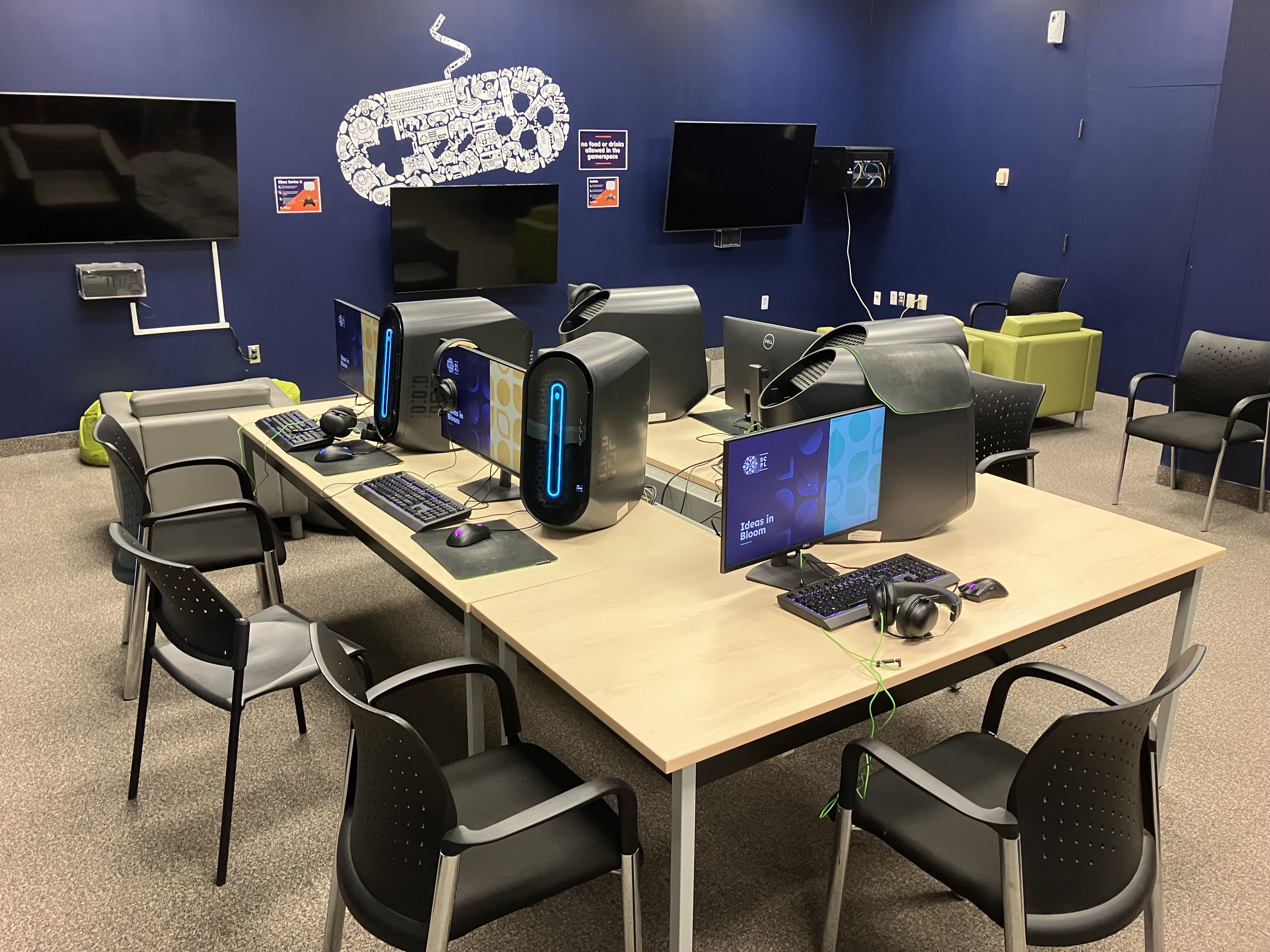
Gamer Room at the St. Catharines Public Library, Ontario. Video game spaces in public libraries are often targeted towards teens and young adults

The Orange County Library System offers numerous teen activities such as a Maker/DIY program, Audio Equipment Training, Sewing classes, Knitting classes, ESL classes, and Chess club.

The Springfield Greene County Library has writing and book clubs as well as a tech training class, board game nights, movie nights, craft classes, and a My Little Pony club.

The Pikes Peak Library District has math tutors for their teen patrons. They also offer writing and book clubs, a Dungeons & Dragons club, a coding lab, an anime club, guided meditation, and an occasional Super Smash Bros. tournament.

==== Children's programs ====
The Belmont Public Library offers an array of children's programs including story times for various age groups, concerts, music classes, puppet shows, a maker club, and sing-along Saturdays.

The Saratoga Springs Public Library also has numerous story times as well as Yoga for children, parent/child workshops, Spanish workshops, a read-to-a-dog program, and a Kindness club.

The Chelmsford Public Library has a plethora of story times for ages birth to preschool. They also offer baby yoga, stay and play time, toddler rhyme time, a dads and donuts day, and an annual Gingerbread Festival.

History of children's services at the Free Library of Philadelphia has been explored with a focus on the early twentieth century.

=== Diversity ===
A significant goal of American libraries is to become more culturally diverse throughout the country. Public libraries are an equal access facility and want to make everyone feel welcome no matter their religion, race, ethnicity, gender identity, sexual orientation, ability, or financial status. To accomplish this goal, libraries are striving to find ways in which to make, staff, collections, and library programs they provide more culturally sensitive.

A starting point for most libraries is to find out the demographics in which they are located. Once the library system learns more about the community they serve, they can start building a collection and programs around it. Another suggestion from multiple experts says to hire staff that represents the society that the library is located in order to better relate and serve members of that society.

By performing a diversity audit on the items in a libraries collection staff can determine if the materials available offer a wide range of viewpoints and perspectives. The results of the audit can help inform purchasing decisions in the future, to assist staff in building a well rounded collection.

By making culturally diverse programs, a library can be inviting to many members of the community. A few ways libraries accomplish this goal are by providing programs which are inclusive to many different cultures such as having lectures or events in different languages, including celebrations and holidays that are diverse, and by inviting speakers and authors from different cultures to come and talk.

=== Research assistance ===
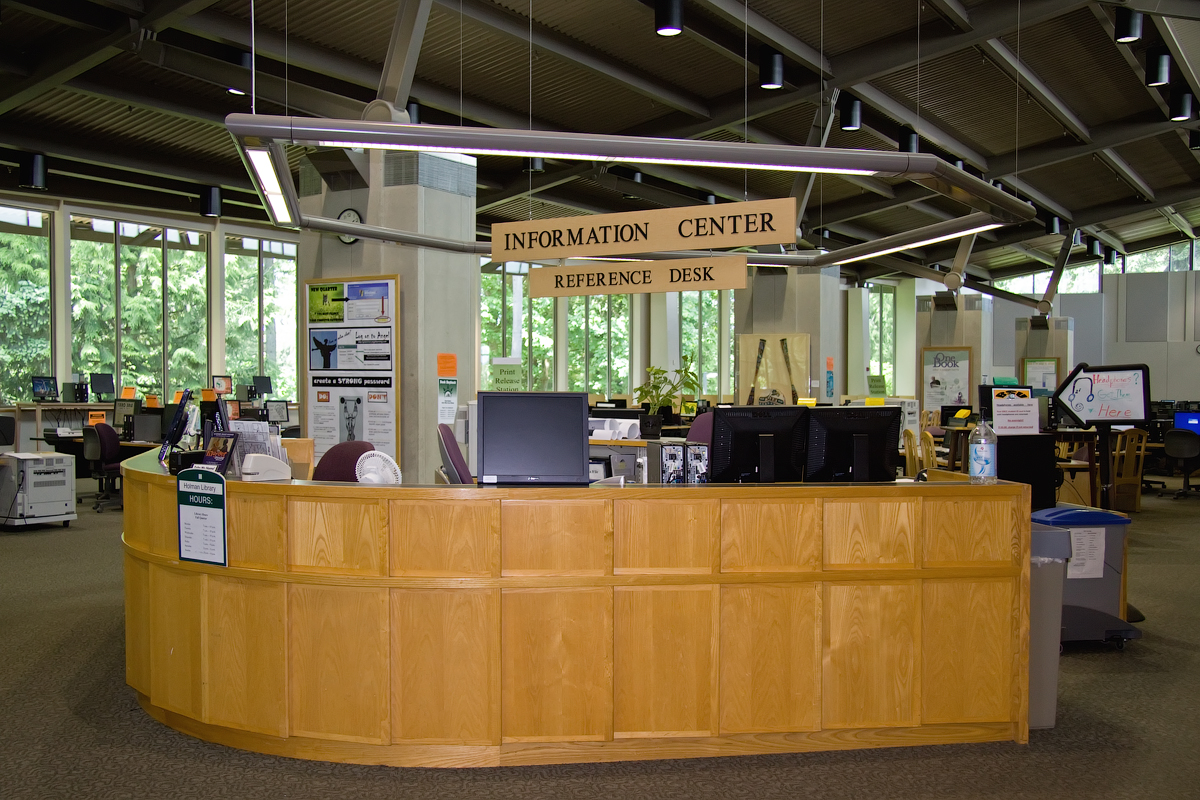
Library Reference desk in Holman Library, Auburn, Washington

Librarians at most public libraries provide reference and research help to the general public. This can include assisting students in finding reliable sources for papers and presentations; helping the public find answers to questions or evidence in a debate; or providing resources related to a specific event or topic. Reference assistance is usually provided through a reference interview which is usually conducted at a public reference desk but may also be conducted by telephone or online. Reference librarians may also help patrons develop an appropriate bibliography or works cited page for an academic paper. Depending on the size of the library, there may be multiple reference desks that deal with different topics. Large public, academic or research libraries may employ librarians that are experts in specific topics or subjects. Often the children's section in a public library has its own reference desk. At a smaller library, circulation and reference may occur at the same desk.

The Internet has had a significant effect on the availability and delivery of reference services. Many reference works, such as the Encyclopædia Britannica, have moved entirely online, and the way people access and use these works has changed dramatically in recent decades. The rise of search engines and crowd-sourced resources such as Wikipedia have transformed the reference environment. In addition to the traditional reference interview, reference librarians have an increasing role in providing access to digitized reference works (including the selection and purchase of databases not available to the general public) and ensuring that references are reliable and presented in an academically acceptable manner. Librarians also have a role in teaching information literacy, so that patrons can find, understand and use information and finding aids like search engines, databases and library catalogs: for instance, patrons who lack access to expensive academic subscriptions can be taught to Unpaywall to access open access literature easily.

Public and academic libraries in the US answer over seven million questions weekly. The Boston Public Library answers more than one million reference questions annually.

=== Reference collections ===
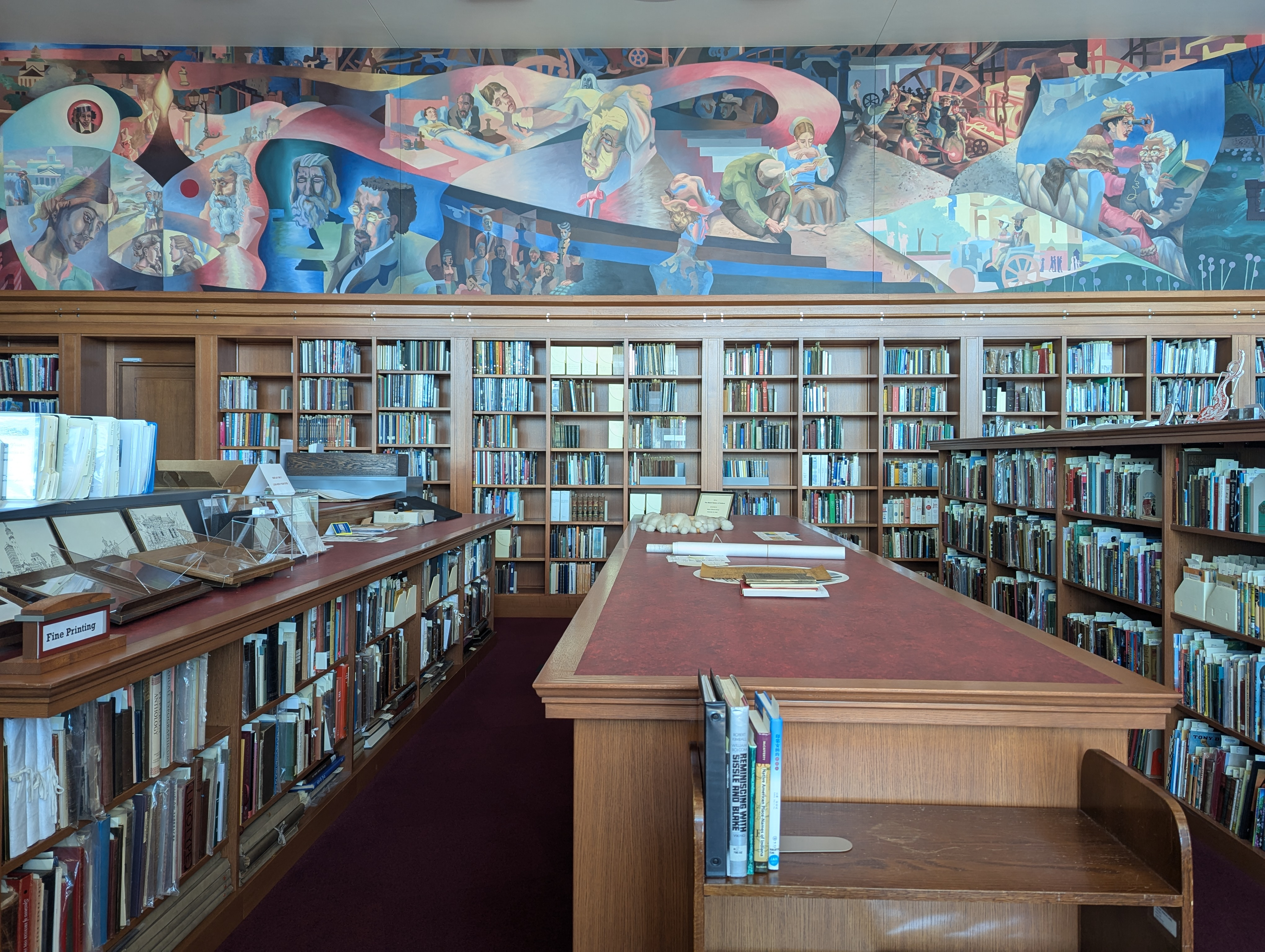
Special Collections Room, Central Library, Indianapolis Public Library, Indianapolis, Indiana

In addition to their circulating collection, public libraries usually offer a collection of reference books, such as encyclopedias, dictionaries, phone books and unique or expensive academic works. These books may not be available for borrowing, except under special circumstances. Reference books that are frequently used, such as phone books, may be housed in a special section called "ready reference".

Some libraries also keep historical documents relevant to their particular town, and serve as a resource for historians in some instances. The Queens Public Library kept letters written by unrecognized Tiffany lamp designer Clara Driscoll, and the letters remained in the library until a curator discovered them. Some libraries may also serve as archives or government depositories, preserving historic newspapers, property records or government documents. Collections of unique or historical works are sometimes referred to as special collections; except in rare cases, these items are reference items, and patrons must use them inside the library under the supervision or guidance of a librarian. Local libraries' special collections may be of particular interest to people researching their family history. Libraries that are focused on collecting works related to particular families are genealogical libraries and may be housed in the same building as a public library.

Many libraries—especially large, urban libraries—have large collections of photographs, digital images, rare and fragile books, artifacts and manuscripts available for public viewing and use. Digitization and digital preservation of these works is an ongoing effort, usually funded by grants or philanthropy. In 2005, the New York Public Library offered the "NYPL Digital Gallery" which made a collection of 275,000 images viewable over the web; while most of the contents are in the public domain, some images are still subject to copyright rules. Limited funding, copyright restrictions, a lack of expertise and poor provenance are barriers to the large-scale digitization of libraries' special collections.

=== Other services ===
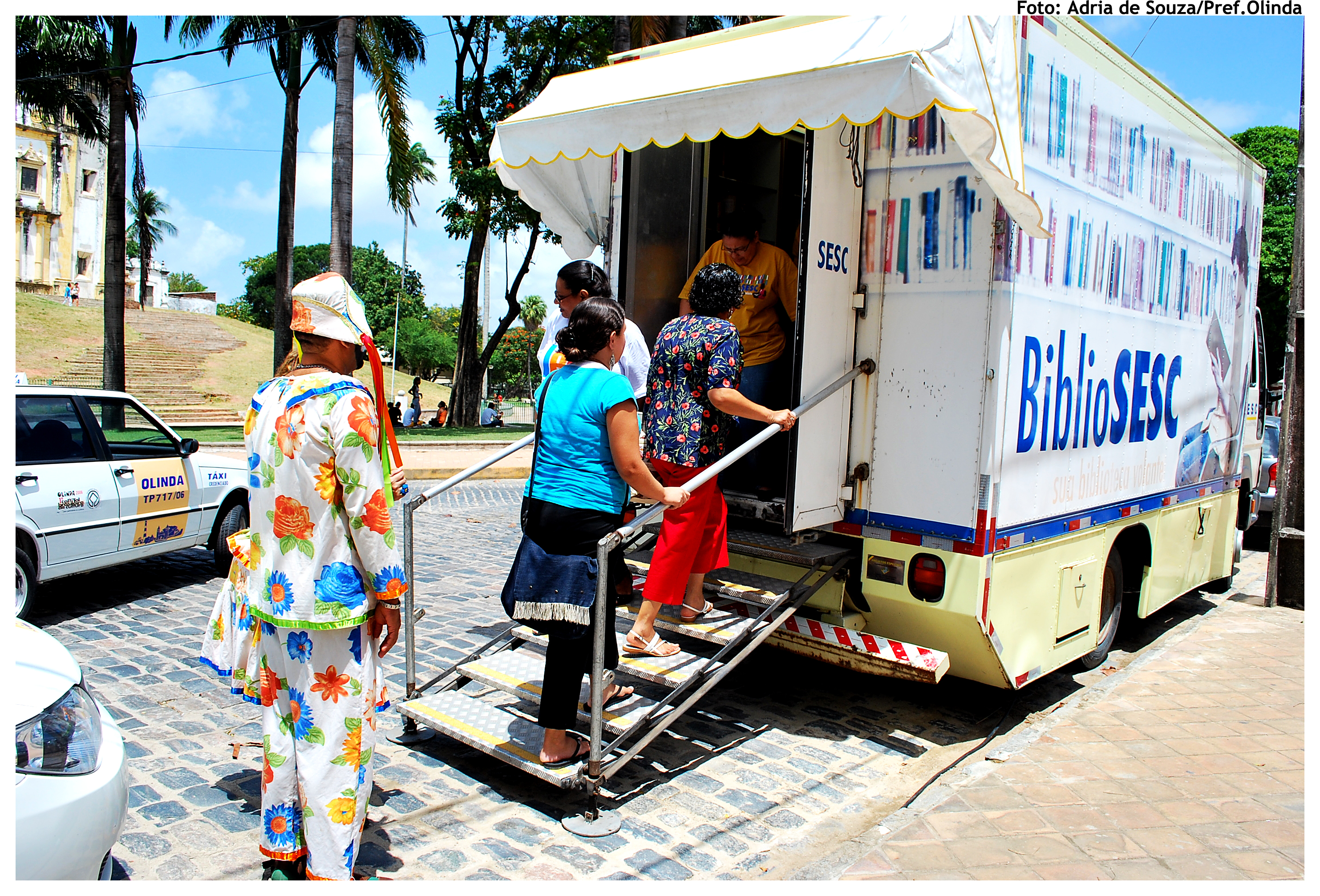
Mobile library in Olinda, Pernambuco, Brazil.

Depending on a community's desires and needs, public libraries may offer many other resources and services to the public. In addition to print books and periodicals, most public libraries today have a wide array of other media including audiobooks, e-books, CDs, cassettes, videotapes, and DVDs. Certain libraries stock general materials for borrowing, such as pots, pans, sewing machines, and similar household items in order to appeal to a larger population. Collections of books and academic research related to the local town or region are common, along with collections of works by local authors. Libraries' storage space and lending systems may be used to lend a wide range of materials, including works of art, cake pans, seeds, tools and musical instruments. Similar to museums and other cultural institutions, libraries may also host exhibits or exhibitions.

In addition to the extension of media variety and services, public libraries have been experimenting with different means to cater more specifically to their local patrons. One such program in California, Zip Books, works to provide books that libraries may not have in their collections for patrons who may be looking for them. Initially started as a pilot program in 2011 through an LSTA grant from the California Public Library system, the program works by patrons of partnered library districts initially making requests for books through Zip that their libraries does not possess. The libraries then purchase the books and have them sent directly to the patron requesting them. Then, once the patron has finished the books, they simply bring them to their local library, where the library will then incorporate them into their collection. Any libraries seeking to join the program can write out an application for their district to join Zip and their application then goes through a review process determined by need and the funding that is available. Funding is then distributed to members each year, with current members and libraries already on a waitlist taking first priority. This program, as of early 2022, has been expanded to 89 districts throughout California and any new applicants can apply for up to $35,000 worth of books in tangible formats. The maintenance of this program does fall onto the individual libraries and their librarians are then responsible for record keeping and managing the grant funds and their requests.

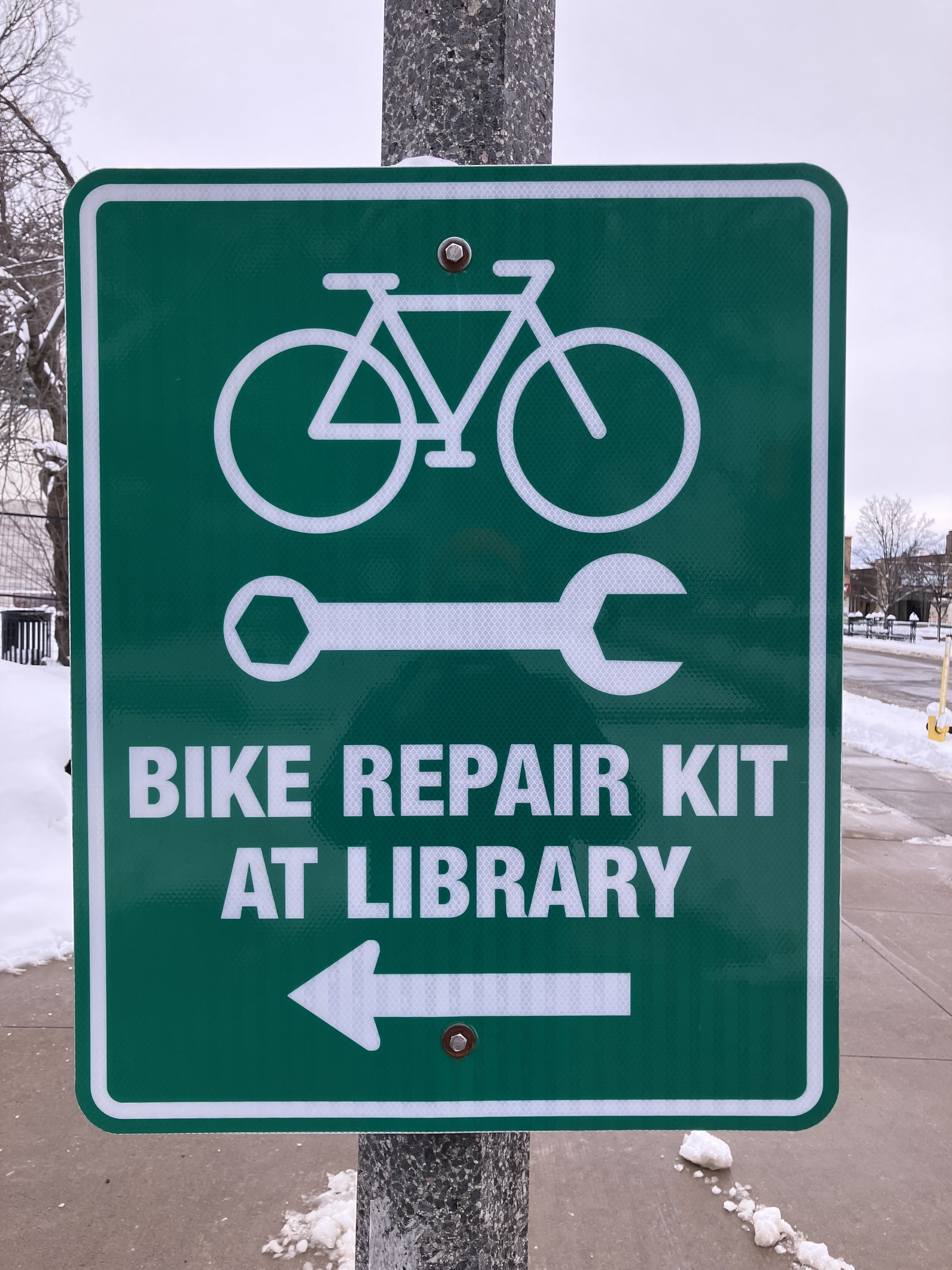
Some libraries offer bike repair kits as part of their lending services. This service is located at the St. Catharines Public Library

As more government services move online, libraries and librarians have a role in providing access to online forms and assistance with filling them out. For example, in 2013, American public libraries were promoted as a way for people to access online health insurance marketplaces created by the Affordable Care Act.

In rural areas, the local public library may have a bookmobile service, consisting of one or more buses or pack animals (such as burros, camels, donkey, or elephants) furnished as small public libraries, some equipped with Internet access points or computer labs, and serving the countryside according to a regular schedule. In communities that are extremely isolated or that have poor digital infrastructure, libraries may provide the only access to online education, telemedicine, or remote work. Libraries also partner with schools and community organizations to promote literacy and learning.

24-hour library access has been piloted in certain public libraries in North America, such as the Pioneer Library System's Norman Public Library in Oklahoma and Ottawa Public Library in Ontario. Such access may involve anywhere from a "library vending machine," in which print books are mechanically vended to (and dispensed from) patrons, to reduced staff during the night and early morning hours.

Libraries promote cultural awareness; in Newark, New Jersey, the public library celebrated African-American history with exhibits and programs. One account suggested libraries were essential to "economic competitiveness" as well as "neighborhood vitality" and help some people find jobs.

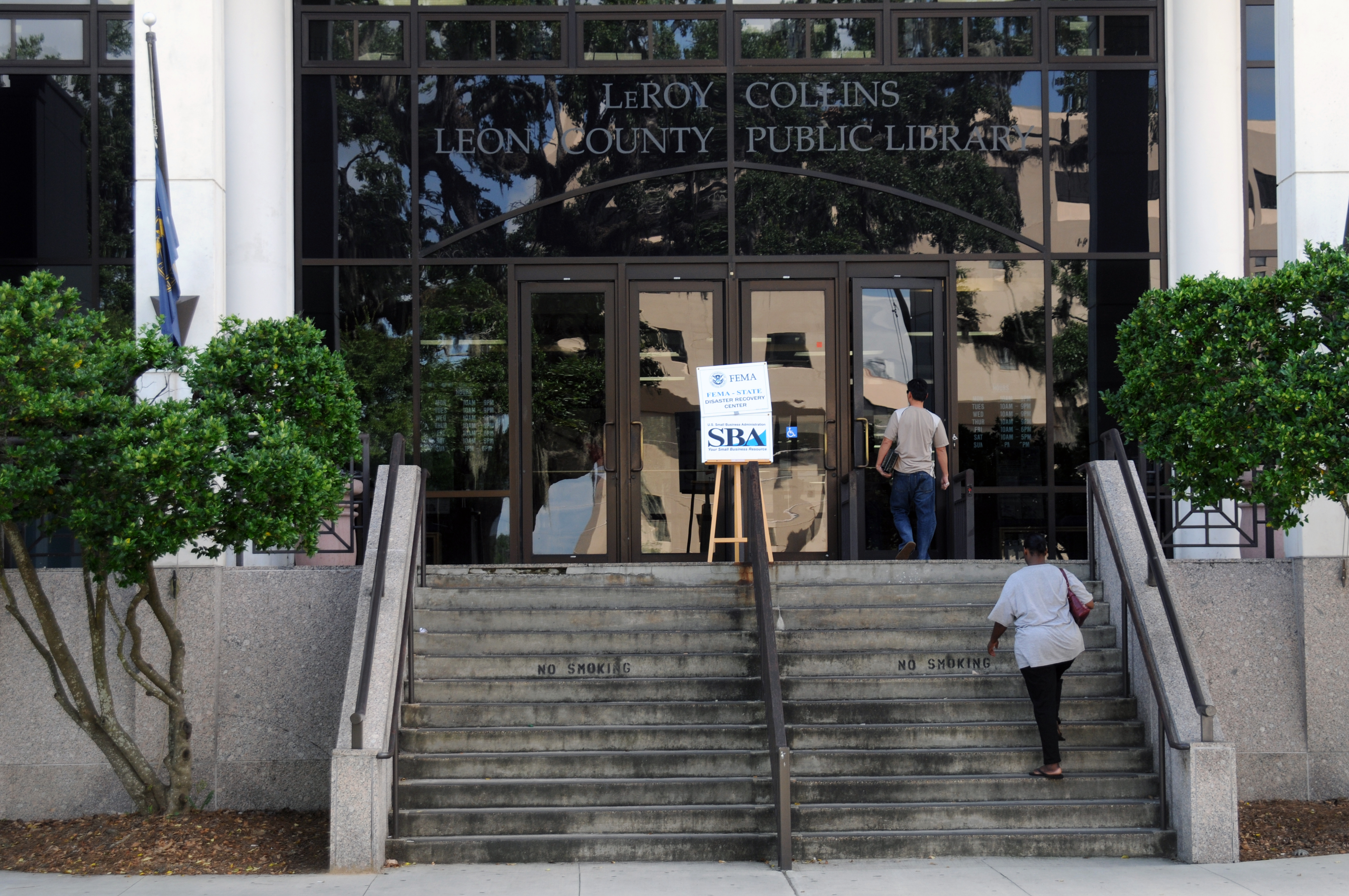
FEMA Leon County Disaster Recovery Center, located inside the LeRoy Collins Public Library, Tallahassee, Florida

Libraries have in important role during emergencies and disasters, where they may be used as shelters, provide space to charge phones and access the Internet, and serve as locations for the distribution of aid, especially financial aid, which requires access to computers and the Internet. The U.S. Federal Emergency Management Agency recognizes libraries as providing essential community service during times of disaster. Libraries have also had in increasingly important economic role during the recession, providing job search assistance, computer skills training and resume help to patrons.

In response to the COVID-19 pandemic, many libraries have begun offering remote and distance learning options for patrons.

== Organization ==
The establishment or development of a public library involves creating a legal authorization and governing structure, building a collection of books and media, as well as securing reliable funding sources, especially government sources. Most public libraries are small, serving a population of under 25,000, and are (or were) established in response to specific local needs. In A Library Primer, John Cotton Dana's 1899 work on the establishment and management of libraries in the United States, Dana wrote:

Each community has different needs, and begins its library under different conditions. Consider then, whether you need most a library devoted chiefly to the work of helping the schools, or one to be used mainly for reference, or one that shall run largely to periodicals and be not much more than a reading room, or one particularly attractive to girls and women, or one that shall not be much more than a cheerful resting-place, attractive enough to draw man and boy from street corner and saloon. Decide this question early, that all effort may be concentrated to one end, and that your young institution may suit the community in which it is to grow, and from which it is to gain its strength.

After being established and funded through a resolution, public referendum or similar legal process, the library is usually managed by a board of directors, library council or other local authority. A librarian is designated as the library director or library manager. In small municipalities, city or county government may serve as the library board and there may be only one librarian involved in the management and direction of the library. Library staff who are not involved in management are known in the United States and some other English-speaking countries as "library paraprofessionals" or "library support staff". They may or may not have formal education in library and information science. Support staff have important roles in library collection development, cataloging, technical support, and the process of preparing books for borrowing. All of these tasks may be referred to as technical services, whether or not they involve information technology. While the library's governing board has ultimate authority to establish policy, many other organizations may participate in library management or library fundraising, including civic and voluntary associations, women's clubs, Friends of the Library groups, and groups established to advise the library on the purchase and retention of books.

State and national governments may also have a role in the establishment and organization of public libraries. Many governments operate their own large libraries for public and legislative use (e.g., state libraries, the Library of Congress, the Bibliothèque Nationale de France). These governments can also influence local libraries by reserving formal recognition or funding for libraries that meet specific requirements. Finally, associations of library and information professionals, such as the American Library Association (ALA) and the Chartered Institute of Library and Information Professionals (CILIP) help establish norms and standard procedures, secure funding, advocate at the state or national level and certify library schools or information schools.

== Funding ==
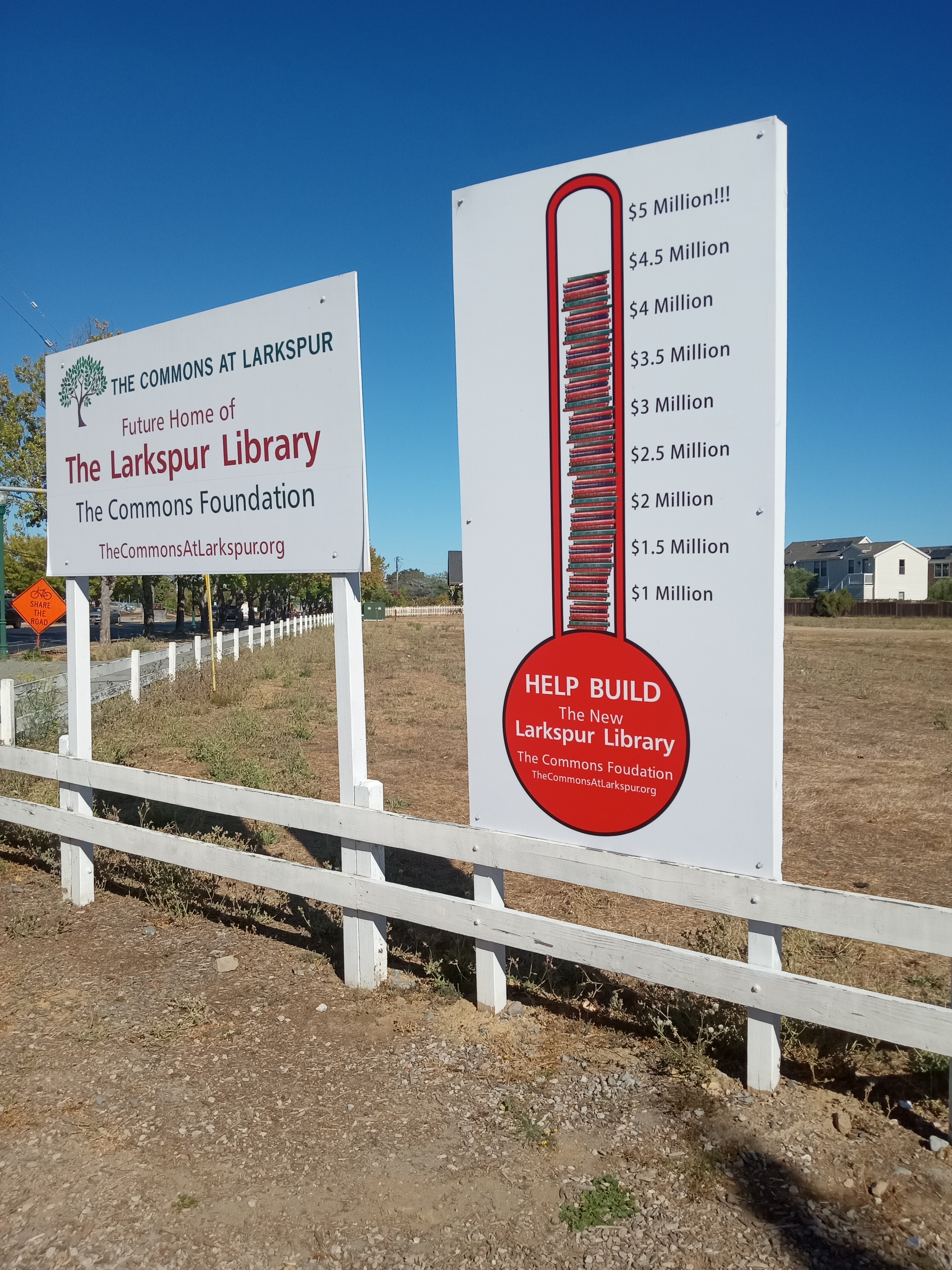
Funding meter sign for new library

Public libraries are funded from a range of sources, the most significant of which is usually local or municipal funding. The citizens who use a local library support it via the city or county government, or through a special-purpose district, which is a local government body that has independent leadership and may levy its own taxes. Local funding may be supplemented by other government funding. For example, in the United States, the state and federal governments provide supplementary funding for public libraries through state aid programs, the Library Services and Technology Act (LSTA) and E-Rate. In England, Local Authorities have a statutory duty to provide residents with a library service as set out in the Local Government Act 1974. State and local governments may also offer cities and counties large grants for library construction or renovation. Private philanthropy has also had a significant role in the expansion and transformation of library services, and, like other educational institutions, some libraries may be partially funded by an endowment. Some proactive librarians have devised alliances with patron and civic groups to supplement their financial situations. Library "friends" groups, activist boards, and well organized book sales also supplement government funding.

Public funding has always been an important part of the definition of a public library. However, with local governments facing financial pressures due to the Great Recession, some libraries have explored ways to supplement public funding. Cafes, bakeries, bookstores, gift shops and similar commercial endeavors are common features of new and urban libraries. The Boston Public Library has two restaurants and an online store which features reproductions of photographs and artwork. Pressure on funding has also led to closer partnerships between libraries, and between libraries and for-profit ventures, in order to sustain the library as a public space while providing business opportunities to the community. While still fairly uncommon, public-private partnerships and "mixed-use" or "dual-use" libraries, which provide services to the public and one or more student populations, are occasionally explored as alternatives. Jackson County, Oregon (US), closed its entire 15-branch public library system for six months in 2007, reopening with under a public-private partnership and a reduced schedule. Small fees, such as library fines or printing fees, may also offset the cost of providing library services, though fines and fees do not usually have a significant role in library funding. The decline of support from local governments has left libraries compensating at the expense of their patrons. In the article "Waking Up to Advocacy in a New Political Reality for Libraries", as early as the 1980s, libraries began charging fees and accruing fines for services rendered. These services included "printing, notarizing, scanning, photocopying, photo services, library cards for those who live outside of the service area, meeting room usage, document searches, inter-library loan, and e-book checkouts, and among many others."

Data shows disparities in private and public libraries, exemplifying that libraries in rural areas possess weaker technological infrastructures and fewer full-time employees holding the title of Librarian. Data shows that funding and service levels differ across and within states. Rural libraries tend to have smaller collections, lower bandwidth rates, less staff and fewer hours of operations. Access to high quality internet may be limited for lower-income individuals, ethnic minorities and rural residents. Due to underused libraries in less-advantaged communities, local governments have permanently closed libraries, affecting individuals that are less educated.

Although usage of public libraries has increased significantly in recent decades, libraries are under intense financial pressure and scrutiny. The American Library Association says media reports it compiled in 2004 showed some $162 million in funding cuts to libraries nationwide. In 2009, 40% of states reported a decline in state aid for libraries. In 2012, Great Britain lost over 200 libraries to budget cuts, part of a general trend of fiscal austerity in Europe. However, there are signs of stabilization in library funding. As of 2012, funding for construction and renovation of new libraries remains steady. Cities' plans to close public libraries are frequently cancelled or scaled back. In 2012, voters in 13 U.S. states approved new funding for library construction or operations. In the UK, the Library of Birmingham, which opened in 2013, is the largest cultural space in Europe.

Survey data suggests the public values free public libraries. A Public Agenda survey in 2006 reported 84% of the public said maintaining free library services should be a top priority for their local library. Public libraries received higher ratings for effectiveness than other local services such as parks and police. But the survey also found the public was mostly unaware of financial difficulties facing their libraries. In various cost-benefit studies libraries continue to provide returns on the taxpayer dollar far higher than other municipal spending. A 2008 survey discusses comprehensively the prospects for increased funding in the United States, saying in conclusion "There is sufficient, but latent, support for increased library funding among the voting population." A 2013 Pew Research Center survey reported that 90% of Americans ages 16 and older said that the closing of their local public library would affect their community, with 63% saying it would have a "major" impact.

== See also ==
- Public libraries in North America
- Public library advocacy
- Public Library Association, a division of the American Library Association

== Sources ==
- Casson, Lionel (2001). Libraries in the ancient world. New Haven: Yale University Press. ISBN 9780300088090.
