= Mass media in Belgium =

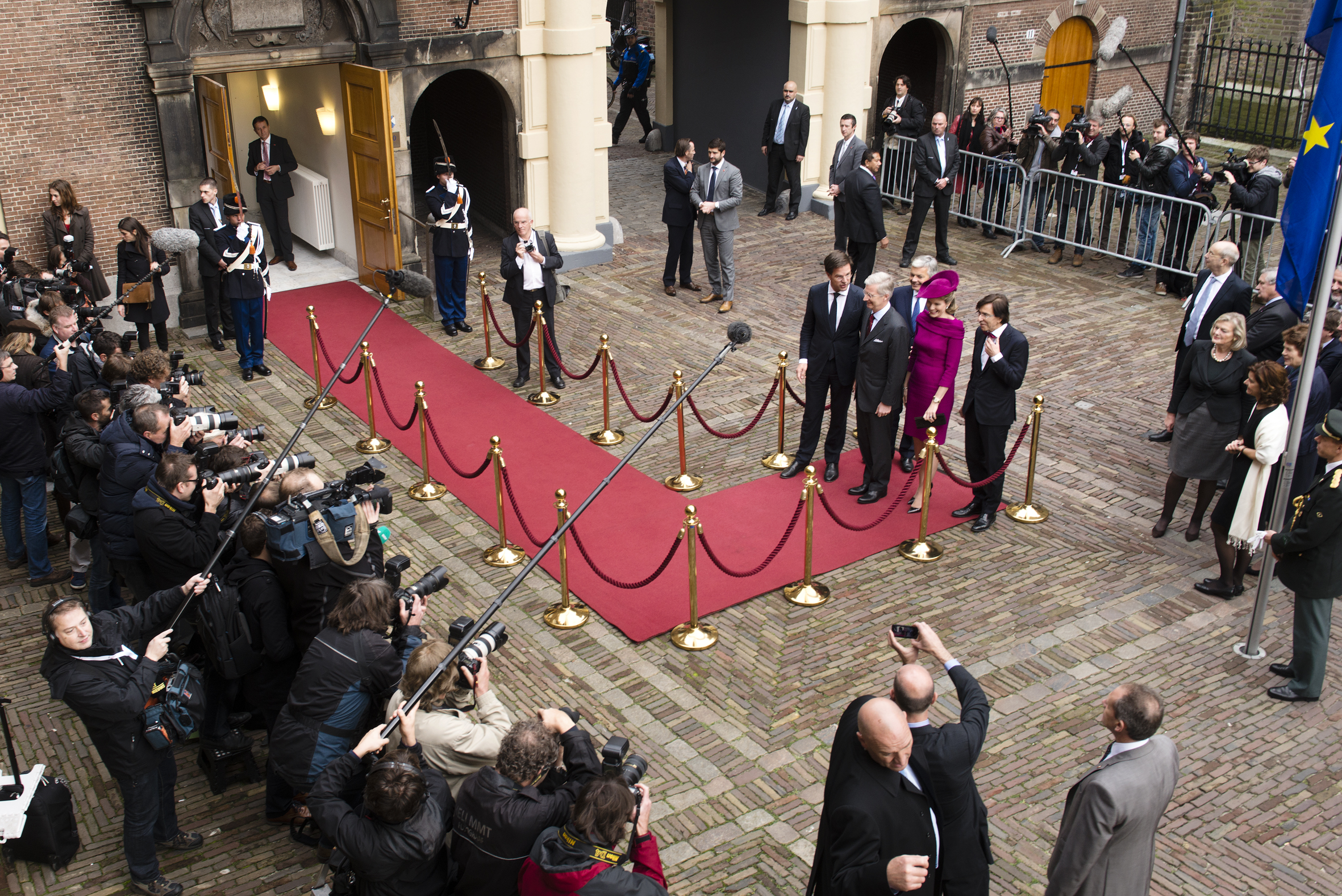
Prime Minister Rutte receives the Belgian King Filip and Queen Mathilde for an initial introduction. They were accompanied by Prime Minister Di Rupo. In Belgium, it is customary for the Prime Minister to travel with the Royal Couple on such visits.

The mass media in Belgium is characterized by its diversity due to the linguistic divide in the country.

== Radio and television ==
Radio and television regulation are regional competencies.

=== Radio ===
In 1998, Belgium had 79 FM radio stations, 7 AM stations and 1 SW station, serving 8.075 million radios owned in the country. Transmission is primary by terrestrial broadcast antenna. Analogue transmissions are provided by Norkring Belgium, Broadcast Partners, D'Hont Noël and TVVV Sound. Digital transmissions are provided by Norkring Belgium. Digital cable operators and internet providers also provide radio signals. Satellite transmission is provided by TV Vlaanderen.

Public radio in Belgium is controlled by the VRT for the Dutch-speaking region (Flanders and Brussels) the RTBF for the French-speaking region (Wallonia and Brussels) and the BRF for the German community in Belgium. Numerous private operators exist. The main competitor in the Flanders and Brussels regions is VMMa. The main competitor in the Wallonia and Brussels regions is RTL Group.

Next to these regional channels, local channels exists. E.g. Radio 2 Limburg and GO FM. In 2009 radio market share in the Dutch-speaking region was 63.08% for the VRT channels (Radio 1, Radio 2, MNM, Studio Brussel and Klara, 23.13% for the VMMa channels (Q-Music and Joe FM) and 2.65% for the Corelio/Concentra joint venture channel (Radio Nostalgie).

==== Publicity management ====
Radio advertising is managed in house in most cases. Two radio advertising agencies operate, Vlaamse Audiovisuele Regie and IP Plurimedia.

=== Television ===
Transmission is primary by fiberoptic or coax cable television network (DVB-C) or copper telephone line (xDSL). Terrestrial transmission (DVB-T) also exists. In terms of television, there were 25 broadcast stations in 1997, and a further 10 repeaters. This digital terrestrial network is owned by Norking Belgium. Small operators of analog networks exist. Satellite transmission (DVB-S) in Flanders, Brussels and Wallonia is operated by Airfield Belgium or Digidream. MNO's Proximus and Mobistar offer digital television over mobile phone (DVB-H). In 1997, 4.72 million televisions were owned nationwide.

Public television in Belgium is controlled by the VRT for the Dutch-speaking region (Flanders and Brussels) the RTBF for the French-speaking region (Wallonia and Brussels) and the BRF for the German community in Belgium. Numerous private operators exist. The main competitors in the Flanders and Brussels regions are VMMa and SBS Belgium. VMMa is a joint venture of De Persgroep and Roularta Media Group. The main competitors in the Wallonia and Brussels regions are RTL Group and AB Groupe.

Next to these regional channels, local channels exists. E.g. TV Oost and ROB TV. In Flanders, VRT channels (Eén, Canvas and Ketnet/OP12) had a combined market share of 42.0% in 2012, VMMa channels (Vtm, 2BE, Vitaya and vtmKzoom) 28.8%, SBS Belgium channels (VIER and VIJF) 10.5% and Concentra (Acht) 0.5%.

There are numerous public and private media companies that specialise as producer or distributor of channels, content and video services. E.g. Studio 100 and Woestijnvis.

==== Production facility providers ====
There are numerous public and private media companies that specialise as producer or distributor of television production facilities. e.g. Videohouse.

== Printed press ==
Major newspapers and magazines in Belgium are printed monolingual either in Dutch or in French. Bilingual publications are very minor. Belgium's major news agency is Belga. Minor news agencies exist. Belgium's major photo agencies are Scripta, IP Plurimedia or Mediashake.

=== Newspapers ===
Major Dutch-language daily newspapers in 2008 were Het Laatste Nieuws (De Persgroep) (30.96%), Het Nieuwsblad (Corelio) (27.04%), Gazet van Antwerpen (Concentra) (11.27%), Het Belang van Limburg (Concentra) (10.71%), De Standaard (Corelio) (9.95%), De Morgen (De Persgroep) (5.99%) and De Tijd (Mediafin) (4.08%). Mediafin is a joint venture of De Persgroep and Groupe Rossel.

Major French-language daily newspapers in 2008 were La Dernière Heure (IPM) (16.1%), Le Soir (Groupe Rossel) (16.0%), L'Avenir (Corelio) (15.8%), La Libre Belgique (IPM) (8.3%), L'Echo (Mediafin) (3.7%) and La Meuse (Groupe Rossel), La Capitale (Groupe Rossel), La Nouvelle Gazette (Groupe Rossel), La Province (Groupe Rossel) and Nord éclair (Belgian edition of Nord éclair; Groupe Rossel) (22.0%).

The only major German-language daily newspaper in 2008 was Grenz-Echo (Groupe Rossel). Metro (Concentra) is a major daily free newspaper in a Dutch and French edition.

The Brussels Times is the leading daily online newspaper in English. They also publish an English language printed magazine.

=== Magazines ===
Major Dutch-language weekly magazines in 2008 included Kerk en Leven (Drukkerij en Uitgeverij Halewijn) (409,817), Dag Allemaal (402,097), HUMO (227,614), Libelle (DPG Media) (216,506), TV-Blad (158,283), Story (Belgian magazine) (Sanoma Belgium) (159,833), Plus Magazine (Belgium) (134,242), TV-Familie/Blik (129,328), Flair (Sanoma Belgium) (126,831), Knack (DPG Media) (126,646), Trends (Roularta Media Group), 't Pallieterke.

Major French-language weekly magazines in 2008 were Trends (Roularta Media Group), Le Vif/L’Express (Roularta Media Group), Télé Moustique (Sanoma Belgium), Femmes d'Aujourd'hui (DPG Media).

Numerous by-weekly and monthly magazines exist. E.g. Eos Magazine, P-Magazine, and ZozoLala.

The Brussels Times magazine is published every two months for English speakers.

== Media groups ==
There are several major media companies in Belgium, active in numerous media and telecommunication sub-sectors. These companies hold interests in Belgium, France, the Netherlands, Germany, Luxembourg, and the Republic of Ireland:

- Proximus Group
- DPG Media (Christian Van Thillo)
- Roularta (Rik De Nolf)
- Mediahuis
- Play Media
- Telenet Group (Liberty Global)
- VRT (Flemish community)
- Groupe Rossel
- SFR
- RTBF (French community)
- Groupe IPM (Patrice Le Honey)
- Mediawan Thematics (Mediawan)
- Lagardère Group

== Intellectual property rights ==
Intellectual property rights in Belgium are managed by SABAM.

== See also ==
- Telecommunications in Belgium
- Open access in Belgium to scholarly communication

== Bibliography ==
- Ross Eaman (2009). "Belgium". Historical Dictionary of Journalism. Scarecrow Press. ISBN 978-0-8108-6289-0.
- Paul Arblaster (2014). From Ghent to Aix: How They Brought the News in the Habsburg Netherlands, 1550-1700. Brill. ISBN 9789004276475.
