= JIM (Flemish TV channel) =

Flemish television channel

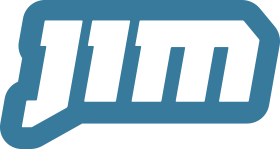
- Country: Belgium
- Headquarters: Vilvoorde, Belgium

Programming
- Languages: Dutch; English
- Picture format: 16:9 576i (SDTV)

Ownership
- Owner: VMMa
- Sister channels: vtm, 2BE

History
- Launched: 2 April 2001
- Closed: 16 December 2015
- Replaced by: Kadet
- Former names: JIMtv (2001-2005)

Links
- Website: www.jim.be

Availability

Streaming media
- Jim.be: Watch live
- JIM Livestream: Watch live
- Yelo TV: Watch live (Belgium only)
- TV Overal: Watch live (Belgium only)

JIM (launched as JIMtv in 2001) was a Flemish television channel of the Medialaan (Now DPG Media) that is aimed at people aged between 15 and 24. Its name is a backronym for "Jong, Interactief en Meer" (English: Young, Interactive and More). During its first years, the channel mainly broadcast music videos. They have since started mixing this with programs such as Brainiac and Snoop Dogg's Father Hood. The channel stopped broadcasting on 16 December 2015.

== History ==
The cradle of JIMtv were Jo Nachtergaele, Michael Dujardin, Peter Hoogland, Frank Molnar, Serge Jespers and Inge Tossyn. They were responsible for the content, the channel look and positioning of JIMtv. The first broadcast on 2 April 2001 started with "God Is A DJ" by Faithless followed by an introductory program in which all people and behind the scenes themselves were submitted. By June, the channel was now at the level of TMF.

During 2002, the channel registered a share of 11,4%. In October of that year, it initiated a talent drive, attracting over 1,200 candidates, later shortlisted to 75 candidates for a video test, and then, just five. The winner was 23-year old Jimmy Borghs from Kempen; he would present The Wok alongside Nina De Man and Nathalie Delporte. For its second anniversary on 2 April 2006, it held a 24-hour live broadcast and introduced a roster of new programs, which included an homage to Jacques Brel. The channel planned entering cable networks in Brussels, but, as of 2004, was still blocked alongside Vitaya because of high costs.

On 2 April 2006, the channel celebrated its fifth anniversary.

Since 2005 until its closure in 2015, the channel was just called JIM. Originally, the letter combination 'JIM' stood for "Jong, Interactief en Meer" (English: Young, Interactive and More). The suffix 'TV' was omitted because VMMa (later called Medialaan from 2014-2018, now DPG Media) initially also wanted to set up a radio station called JIMfm, but those plans were abandoned. In November 2001 VMMa launched still a radio station: Q-music.

On 15 September 2015 Medialaan announced that JIM would cease broadcasting on 16 December 2015. The vacant channel is filled by a new children's channel Kadet from 19 December 2015, which focuses primarily on boys between 8 and 12 years old.

== VJs ==
Some of the VJs of the music channel were Anneleen Liégeois, Anneke Van Hoof, Jan Van den Bossche, Ben Roelants, Thomas Vanderveken, Tess Goossens, Ilse Lievens, Frank Molnar, Eline De Munck, Jelle van Dael, Sean D'Hondt, Kevin Janssens, and many more. In 2015 Niko Van Driessche, Britt Valkenborghs, Vincent Banic, Elisa Guarraci and Jolien De Greef were the VJs of service.

== Logos ==
2001 - 2010

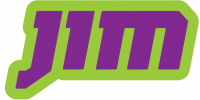
2010 - 2014

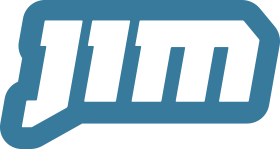
2014 - 2015

== Events ==
=== Jimmies ===
Since 2012 JIM presented annually in February his own playful prizes, De Jimmies (officially JIM awards), in a variety of musical and other mediatic categories:

- best film, the faux pas of the year, person of the year, best game
- the musical in every national and international versions: best group, best newcomer, best clip, best singer, best female singer.

== Livestream ==
Since the logo of JIM and the full range of programs was changed on 11 October 2010, one can now watch JIM live via JIM website.

== Radio station ==
Originally, the VMMa was planning on launching a youth radio station called JIMfm as a complement to JIMtv. These plans were later dropped.
