= Hersilie Rouy =

French pianist and composer (1814–1881)

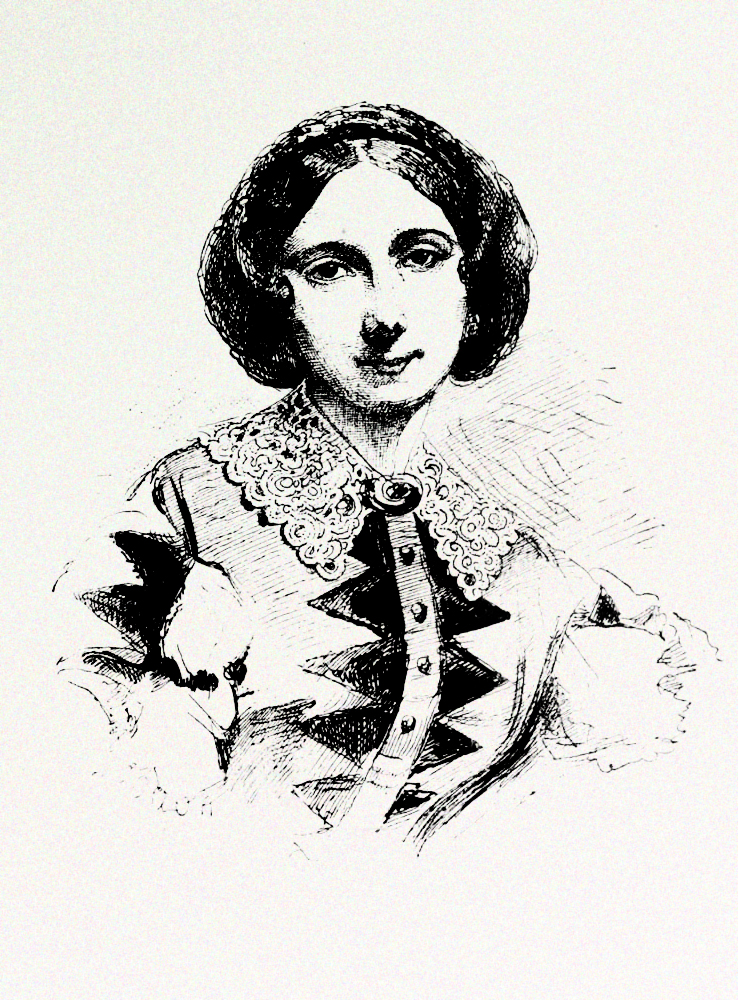
- Born: Camille Joséphine Hersilie Rouy; 14 April 1814; Milan, Napoleonic Italy
- Died: 27 September 1881 (aged 67); Orleans, France
- Education: Conservatoire de Paris
- Occupations: Pianist, composer and asylum reform activist
- Known for: Mémoires d'une aliénée and L'affaire Rouy

Signature
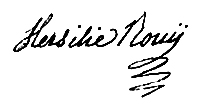

Hersilie Rouy (1814–1881) was a French pianist, composer, and an honorary member of the Paris-based Society of Fine Arts. She spent 14 years in psychiatric asylums before her release, after which she received state compensation. The 'Rouy affair' became known beyond France, where it took on a political dimension. Along with her diaries, Rouy's life events are the subject of historical psychiatric research as well as the portrayal of women's lives in the 19th century.

== Life ==
=== Early life and education ===
Camille Joséphine Hersilie Rouy, called Hersilie Rouy, was born on 14 April 1814 in Milan, then part of Napoleonic Italy, to Charles Rouy and Henriette Chevalier. Her father held a patent for a device for celestial cartography and worked as an astronomer. After Napoleon's rule ended, the French family moved back to Paris. From 1816 to 1823, they travelled through Poland and Russia while Charles worked as a house teacher for aristocratic families.

Although little is documented about Rouy's early piano training, she was admitted to the Conservatoire de Paris in 1824 on her tenth birthday.

=== Career ===
After her mother's death in 1831, Rouy became a governess for a family in Blois and later in London. In 1836, due to her father's health, Rouy returned to Paris and resumed teaching piano.

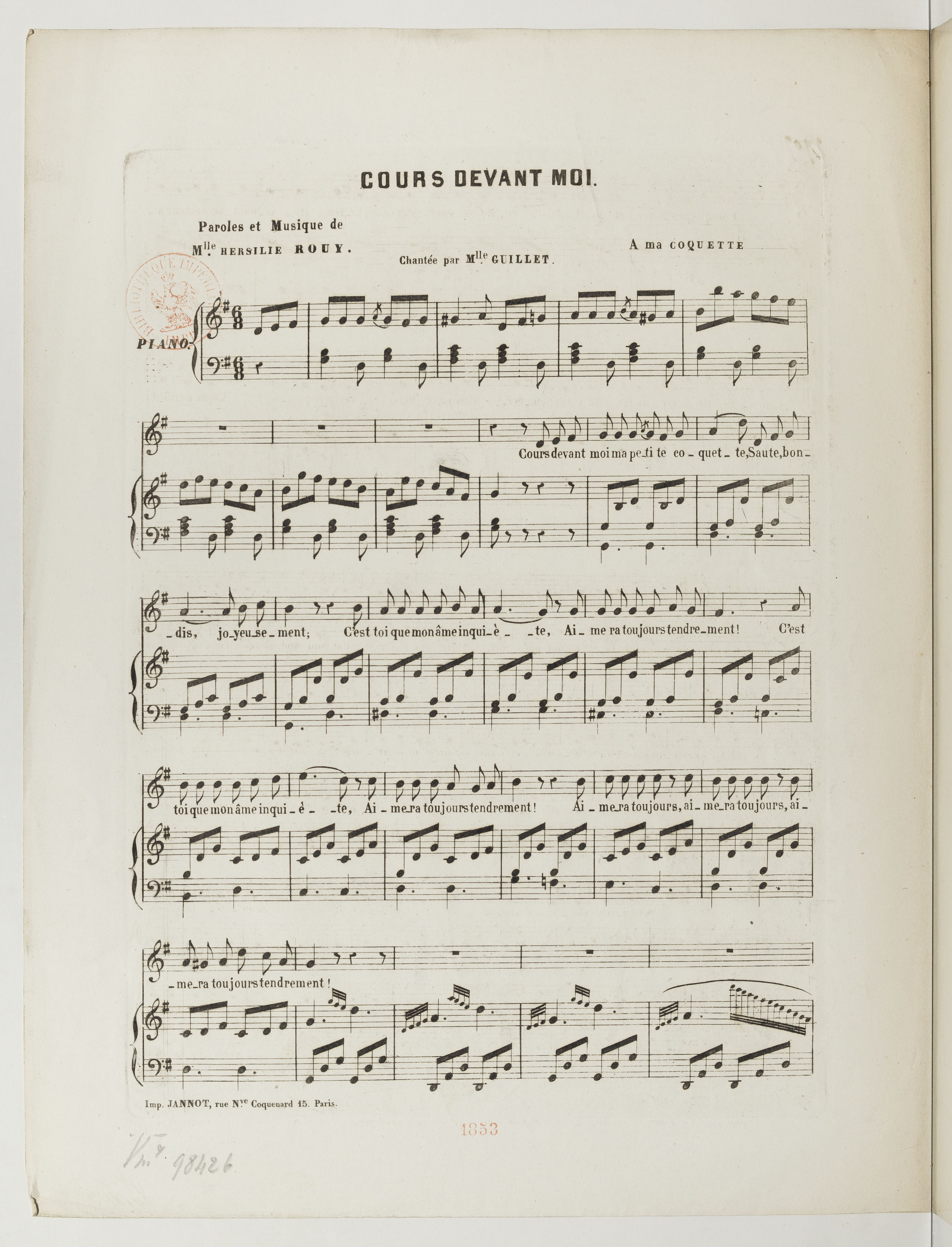
Cours devant moi !

Rouy established herself in the Parisian music scene. From 1838 to 1840, French poet and music reviewer Théophile Gautier expressed his fascination with Rouy, describing her as "one of the best pianists in Paris" whose "nouvelles études" further enhanced her "consummate talent" and "almost placed her on a par with Döhler, with Liszt, with Herz and with Kalkbrenner". Rouy's name reappeared in the annals of Paris at the end of 1848 when, after the Revolution and following her father's death, she fell into financial hardship and received financial assistance from the Fine Arts Department (Direction des Beaux-Arts). In 1850, Rouy became an honorary member of the Society of Fine Arts (Société des Beaux-Arts). She resumed her work as a house concert performer and piano teacher and led a financially secure life as a recognised pianist, also known outside France. Rouy also began composing during this period.

In 1853, Parisian art book publisher de Bonnot released her piano song under the misspelt name Roux, "Cours devant moi" (Run in front of me), based on a text by the French Renaissance female poet Du Guillet.

=== After 1868 ===
Beginning in 1854 at age 40, Rouy spent a total of 14 years in asylums and did not play the piano during this period. Following her asylum release in 1868, which was reported in the Journal des débats (which referred to her as the "former young brilliant pianist") and was picked up by English-speaking newspapers, Rouy gave her final concert for a circle of friends and supporters.

After her release, Rouy was homeless and destitute with her possessions having been auctioned off in 1854. With the support of friends, Rouy successfully applied and was granted state compensation in 1878. Rouy died of pneumonia on 27 September 1881.

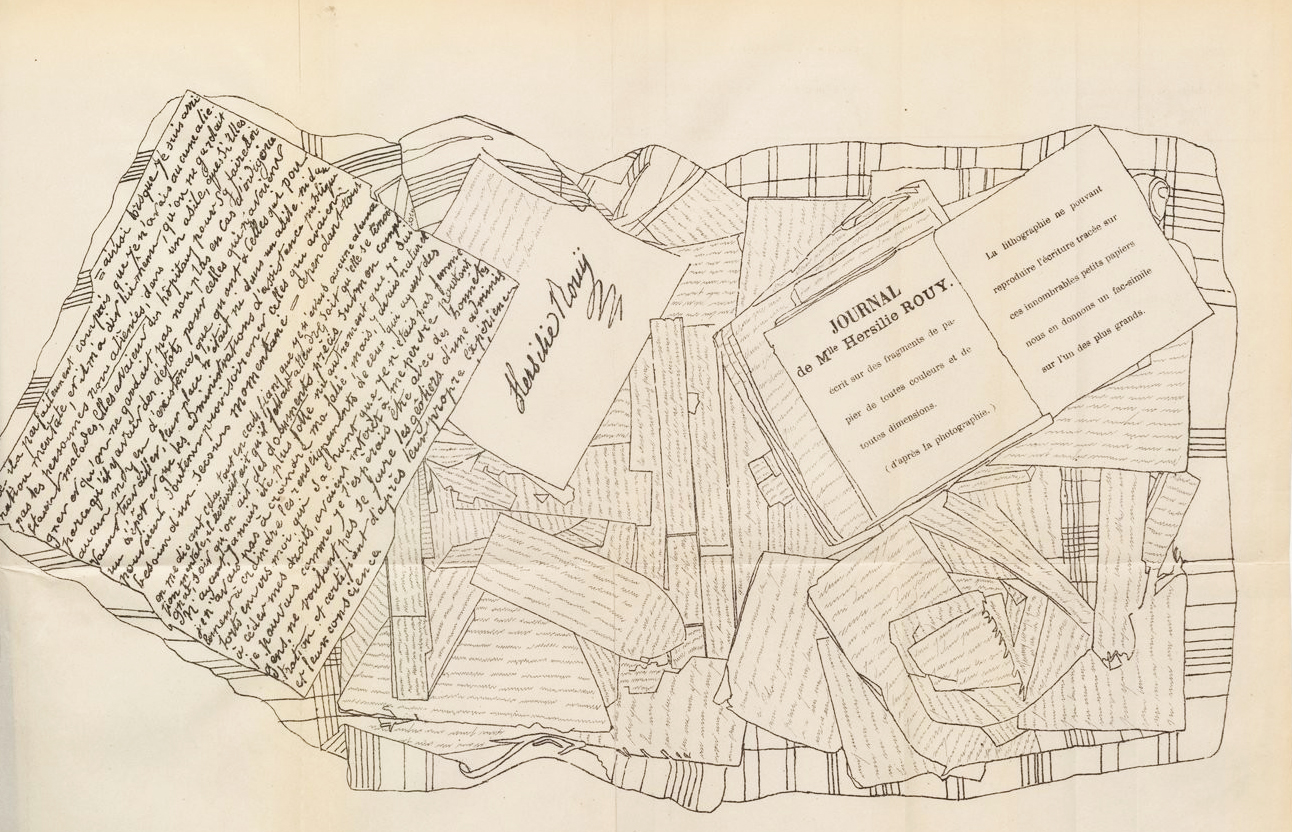
Drawn facsimile of Hersilie's writings in her published memoirs by Le Normant

In 1883, Rouy's entries from her time in asylums was published by Ollendorff, a French publishing house. These writings were compiled by Le Normant de Varannes, the director of her final asylum in Orleans. The resulting work, titled "Mlle Hersilie – Rouy Mémoires D'une Aliénée" (The Memoirs of a Madwoman), also features a preface by Jules-Stanislas Doinel. Doinel later founded the first Gnostic church of the modern era.

In 1882, a year before the publication of Rouy's memoirs, a "fictionalised version" of Rouy's diary (where Rouy appears as Eucharis Champigny) written under the pseudonym Édouard Burton was published by Le Normant and was called "Les Mémoires d'une feuille de papier écrites par elle-même" (Memoirs of a sheet of paper written by herself).

== 'The Rouy affair' ==
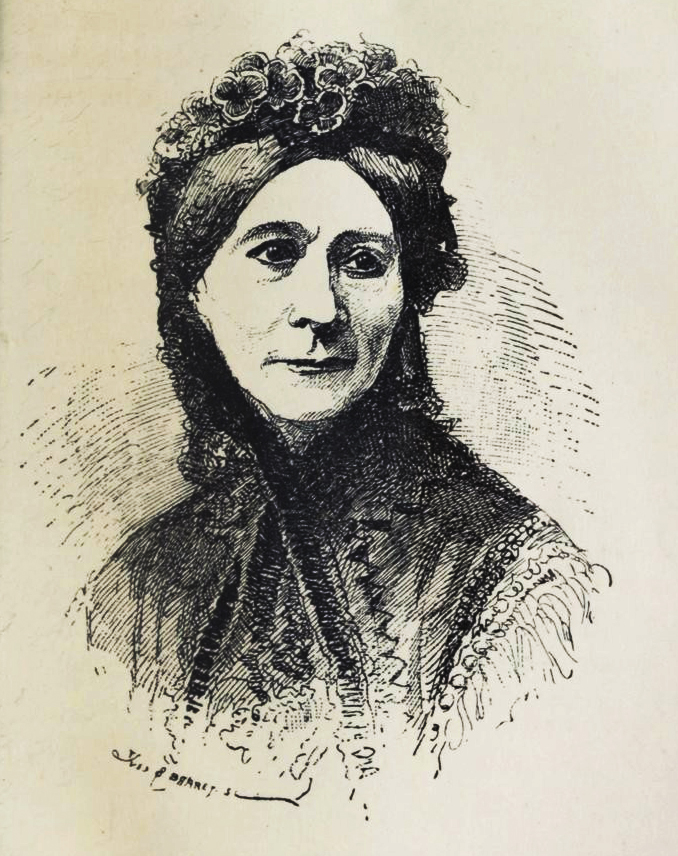
A drawing of Rouy by Yves Barret

=== Institutionalization ===
Rouy was committed to the Hôpital Esquirol on 8 September 1854. Lacking financial resources for this privately run mental institution, Rouy was soon transferred to the Hôpital de la Salpêtrière, resulting in an "unprecedented social decline" for the pianist. In 1863, after staying in three additional asylums, Rouy was finally brought to Orleans and admitted to a hospice under Le Normant's direction.

Her admission under the name Josephine Chevalier, her second given name and her mother's surname, was arranged by her half-brother, the respected Parisian citizen Claude Daniel Rouy who had disapproved of her lifestyle. Rouy exhibited, for the time period, "genuine behavioural abnormalities, which were confirmed by her neighbours", and also an interest in emerging spiritualism. Her half-brother Claude also considered Rouy to be of illegitimate birth, since his father had married Hersilie's mother in Milan before divorcing his first wife.

Throughout her institutionalization, Rouy sought to prove her true identity and gained the support of the director, Le Normant, of her final asylum. Over the course of more than five years, Le Normant attested to Rouy's lucidity and identity and appealed to the prefect. The case reached the Ministry of Justice, which, in 1868, ended her confinement by issuing a certificate of recovery.

Rouy's petition for state compensation drew significant press coverage, including in German-language newspapers that called the case a "horror novel." Her claim was debated in the National Assembly and, after the collapse of the Second Empire, finally approved by the Assembly of the Third Republic. She had been forcibly committed under a false identity as an orphan and registered as destitute. In 1878 she received compensation and a lifelong pension by decree of the Ministry of the Interior as a victim of the abuse of the French law concerning the confinement of the mentally ill (Loi du 30 juin 1838 sur l'enfermement des aliénés). This outcome represented both personal vindication for Rouy and a public acknowledgement of the injustices she endured.

From this perspective, her case entered French history as the "Rouy Affair," serving as a rallying symbol for those challenging psychiatric injustices.

She became an anti-asylum activist through her actions. Although no corresponding evidence exists from any self-advocacy organisation in which she participated, her individual courage inspired later efforts to advocate for patients' rights.

=== Political impact ===
The 'Rouy affair' was initially portrayed in the press as a scandalous imprisonment, and her fight for compensation was reported. However, as early as 1983, during a review of her memoirs, demands for comprehensive political reforms were voiced. These concerned not only the law that "so easily facilitated arbitrary arrests", but also other circumstances surrounding her imprisonment from a time perspective. These included "the urgency of a swift resolution to the divorce issue and the adoption of a law on establishing paternity", those ambiguities Rouy's half-brother could use to justify her confinement, as French historian Monod noted.

The affair gained renewed attention from 1879 onward, when the French politician Guyot and Jean Manier, a former member of the Seine General Council, advocated it. Guyot published detailed articles about Rouy in La Lanterne under the pseudonym L'infirmier (The nurse). Manier released "a lengthy diatribe describing incidents" such as Rouy's, which, in his opinion, illustrated the "abuse of psychiatric power" authorised by the Second Empire. In which, with the support of the psychiatric community, it enables individuals acting in their own interest to exonerate themselves from unwanted family members and have them committed. High-ranking Republicans Gambetta and Favre participated in the "anti-psychiatry press campaigns" and repeatedly raised the issue in the National Assembly because such practices undermined the rights of the bourgeois class. Gambetta had already submitted a draft to the National Assembly in 1870 to revise the 1838 law, mentioning the "Hersilie Rouy" case. However, the change of government in 1871 sealed his initiative at that time.

Through their public and political outcry, activists primarily sought the repeal or reform of the law. French "anti-alienists" joined European Lunatics' rights activism, referencing Rouy as an example of an"ex-inmate". The campaign in France sparked a decades-long public debate that ultimately led to the amendment of the law in 1990.

The institutionalised care of the mentally ill, which emerged in Central and Continental Europe in the 19th century, repeatedly provoked fierce social criticism. In France, the 'Rouy affair' served this purpose, among others, and was repeatedly invoked in the press and in political debates. Not least due to advances in psychiatry that led to new treatment methods, the extensive state-run institutionalisation of the mentally ill underwent profound changes in the 20th century. Ultimately, it was abandoned as impractical.

== Historical context: Psychiatric research and French women in the 19th century ==
Rouy's original diary from 1882 and the version by Le Normant from 1883, purged of evidence of her occasional megalomania, describe her experiences in the asylum and her struggle against her family, doctors, and the 1838 law. Together with the asylum records, they are valuable research sources of which there are very few. Rouy's surviving accounts continue to inform modern perspectives on mental health, injustice, and women's history.

Analysis of these primary materials has produced extensive secondary commentary, which falls into two main categories. The first consists of "psychiatrists who use her memoirs as case-historical material in treatises on afflictions." The second camp includes "critics and re-evaluators of the nineteenth-century French psychiatry", as well as "revisionist historians" who use "Hersilie's description of her experiences in the wider context of women's incarceration in the nineteenth century".

=== Historical psychiatric research as it relates to Rouy ===
Among the first mentioned were French psychiatrists Sérieux and Capgras. In 1909, they published Les Folies raisonnantes: le délire d'interprétation (Reasoning Follies: The Delirium of Interpretation), including their article Roman et vie d'une fausse princesse (Novel and life of a false princess), in which they analysed Rouy's writings, among others. Based on her published 1883 diary by Le Normant, they wrote: "This book reveals the extent to which administrators and magistrates can be impressed by the intellectual vivacity of these «reasoning madwoman», by the correctness of her writing and the skill of her reticence; they even manage to justify a strange, ambitious delusion, based exclusively on interpretations". This publication led to the diagnosis of Delirium of Interpretation, then Capgras delusion in subsequent scientific discussions.

In 1988, author Jeffrey Masson's Against Therapy: Emotional Tyranny and the Myth of Psychological Healing "brought Hersilie's memoirs to the attention of the English-speaking world as a case of 'false commitment' in consideration of the prehistory of psychotherapy". He limited himself to her committal under a false name.

Jann Matlock from University College London, in the 1991 literary analysis Scenes of Seduction: Prostitution, Hysteria, and Reading Difference in Nineteenth-Century France, identifies "Hersilie's strength in the face of adversity as coming from her use of writing as a means of outmanoeuvring her incarcerators" and concluded "Hersilie's autobiography represents her attempt to situate herself among the sane".

In her 2007 book, Mad, Bad and Sad: A History of Women and the Mind Doctors from 1800 to the Present, Lisa Appignanesi documents the historical treatment of mental illness in women, using case studies that also include Rouy. She wrote that Rouy, in response to her complaints about being institutionalised, was told: "Your delusion is total, and all the more dangerous and incurable in that you speak just like a person who is fully in possession of her reason."

The 2010 book L'affaire Rouy: une femme contre l'asile au XIXe siècle (The Rouy case: a woman against the asylum in the 19th century) by historian Yannick Ripa "is a gripping account of an incredible, tragic, and Kafkaesque saga", based on Rouy's 1883 diary and archival material. Ripa examines all aspects concerning Rouy from the perspective of a woman's fate during that period. "Over a person ... about whom everything is supposedly known because of her memoirs. ... The fact that she was a woman could only contribute to a discourse that was more strongly influenced by male ideology than by scientific rigour and truth." Ripa highlights "the place of historical discourse in relation to psychiatric discourse".

In 2015 French psychoanalyst Laurent Soulayrol published Les Mémoires d'une aliénée d'Hersilie Rouy — Vers de nouvelles perspectives, Études Psychanalytiques (The Memoirs of a Madwoman Hersilie Rouy — Towards New Perspectives, Psychoanalytic Studies) which analyzed the chronology of events, Rouy's delusional nature, the perspective of the psychiatrists, and locates her madness in the family constellation according to a typology developed by the French psychoanalyst and psychiatrist Lacan.
