= Christian Van Thillo =

Belgian businessman (born 1962)

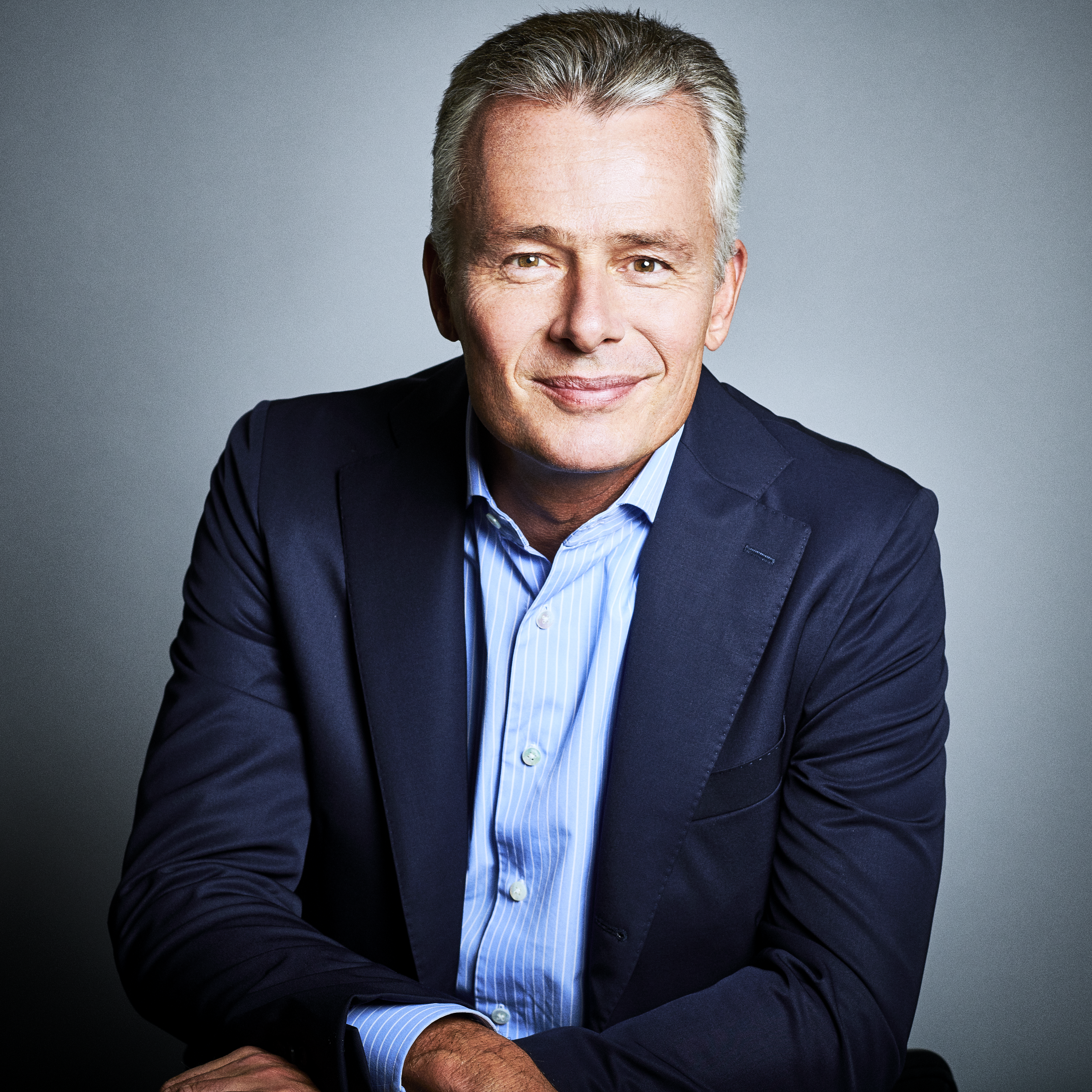
Van Thillo (2020)

Christian Van Thillo (born 25 March 1962) is a Belgian businessman.

He was chief executive officer of DPG Media, a leading family-owned Belgian media concern that owns print media and broadcast media in Belgium and the Netherlands and print media in Denmark. His family-owned business controls the Belgian newspapers Het Laatste Nieuws and De Morgen, Dutch newspapers Algemeen Dagblad, Trouw and De Volkskrant and publications in Denmark. The concern also owns the largest group of commercially funded TV channels in Belgium and several national radio stations including Q-music in Belgium and the Netherlands. It also has a big online presence in Belgium with hln.be being the most visited website in the country. The media concern had a turnover of €1.45 billion ($1.64 billion) in 2017.

== Career ==
In 1989, he became Group Managing Director of De Persgroep, and in 1990, Chief Executive – General Manager of Aurex NV. His subsequent position was CEO of De Persgroep NV. Alongside he was a member of the Regency Committee, of the National Bank of Belgium (NBB). Christian Van Thillo is a member of the Belgian business club Cercle de Lorraine.

On 1 March 2020, Christian Van Thillo stepped down as CEO of DPG Media, a role he had taken up for 30 years. Van Thillo became the company's board's executive chairman, and in that capacity spearheads the group's strategy, acquisition policy and the development of the group's media brands.

== Education and personal life ==
Van Thillo was born in Antwerp, Belgium.

He obtained a master's degree in law at the Katholieke Universiteit Leuven, (Leuven, Belgium) and an MBA from Duke University, (North Carolina, United States).

Van Thillo's personal net value is estimated at €1.6 billion ($1.8 billion). He is married to Nathalie Van Reeth (born 1966), an interior architecture enthusiast.
