= Groupe Rossel =

Belgian media group

Groupe Rossel (French pronunciation: [ɡʁup ʁɔsɛl]; full name: Rossel & Cie, S.A.) is a major media group in Brussels and Wallonia, the French-speaking part of Belgium. The daily newspaper Le Soir is one of its major publications. The other daily the company owns is the subsidiary SudPresse, publishing dailies including La Capitale and La Meuse. Together with DPG Media, Rossel purchased broadsheets De Tijd and L'Echo, and merged these into the new Mediafin. Rossel also owns several French newspapers, including La Voix du Nord. Rossel led a consortium that acquired the French magazines Psychologies and Première.

== Portfolio of publications ==
- 20 minutes, French daily newspaper established in 2002, published together with SIPA - Ouest-France
- Le Soir, Belgian daily newspaper based in Brussels and established in 1887
- Le Soir, Belgian weekly magazine established in 1928
- Metro, Belgian daily newspaper, active from 2000 until 2023

=== Mediafin ===
- De Belegger, Belgian magazine established in 1994
- De Tijd, Belgian newspaper established in 1968
- L'Echo, Belgian newspaper established in 1981
- L'Investisseur, Belgian magazine established in 1983

=== Rossel La Voix ===
Notable daily publications owned by Rossel La Voix include L'Union (a French regional newspaper based in Reims and established in 1944); La Voix du Nord (French regional newspaper based in Lille and established in 1941) and Nord éclair (a French regional newspaper based in Roubaix and established in 1944).

=== Sudmedia ===
Notable dailies owned by Sudmedia include La Capitale, a Belgian regional daily newspaper established in 2002 as a successor of La Lanterne, and La Meuse, French regional daily newspaper established in 1856.
