= European Newspaper Award =

- Description: Design and editorial competition for European newspapers
- Country: Europe (Organized from Germany)
- Presented by: Norbert Küpper in cooperation with journalism magazines

European Newspaper Award is a design competition for European newspapers. The competition was founded and organized by newspaper designer Norbert Küpper from Meerbusch, Germany. He co-operates with the journalist magazines Medium Magazin (Frankfurt), Der Österreichische Journalist (Salzburg), and Schweizer Journalist (Oberuzwil). The first winners were announced in 1999.

In 2013, there were 20 different award categories and the winners would be announced around 15 November.

The following is a list of all winners of the title "European Newspaper of the Year":

== 1. European Newspaper Award (1999) ==
- Local newspaper: Firda, Norway
- Regional newspaper: Dagblad de Limburger, the Netherlands
- Nationwide newspaper: Die Welt, Germany
- Weekly newspaper: no award

== 2. European Newspaper Award (2000) ==
- Local newspaper: Laagendalsposten, Norway
- Regional newspaper: El Correo, Spain
- Nationwide newspaper: The Guardian, Great Britain
- Weekly newspaper: Die Woche, Germany

== 3. European Newspaper Award (2001) ==
- Local newspaper: no award
- Regional newspaper: no award
- Nationwide newspaper: Diário de Noticias, Spain
- Nationwide newspaper: Trouw, the Netherlands
- Weekly newspaper: Independent on Sunday, Great Britain

== 4. European Newspaper Award (2002) ==
- Local newspaper: Tønsbergs Blad, Norway
- Regional newspaper: Bergens Tidende, Norway
- Nationwide newspaper: Ta Nea, Greece
- Weekly newspaper: Frankfurter Allgemeine Sonntagszeitung, Germany

== 5. European Newspaper Award (2003) ==
- Local newspaper: Goienkaria, Spain
- Regional newspaper: Heraldo de Aragón, Spain
- Nationwide newspaper: Corriere della Sera, Italy
- Weekly newspaper: Sunday Tribune, Ireland
- Judges' Special Recognition: La Voz de Galicia, Spain

== 6. European Newspaper Award (2004) ==
- Local newspaper: Diario de Noticias, Spain
- Regional newspaper: Het Parool, the Netherlands
- Nationwide newspaper: De Morgen, Belgium
- Weekly newspaper: Sentinel Sunday, Great Britain
- Weekly newspaper: Bergens Tidende, Norway

== 7. European Newspaper Award (2005) ==
- Local newspaper: Östersunds-Posten, Sweden
- Regional newspaper: Kleine Zeitung, Austria
- Nationwide newspaper: The Guardian, Great Britain
- Weekly newspaper: Die Zeit, Germany
- Weekly newspaper: Presso, Finland

== 8. European Newspaper Award (2006) ==
- Local newspaper: Hufvudstadsbladet, Finland
- Regional newspaper: Bergens Tidende, Norway
- Nationwide newspaper: De Morgen, Belgium
- Weekly newspaper: Expresso, Portugal
- Judges' Special Recognition: Superdeporte, Spain

== 9. European Newspaper Award (2007) ==
- Local newspaper: The Mayo News, Ireland
- Regional newspaper: el Periódico de Catalunya, Spain
- Nationwide newspaper: Eleftheros Tipos, Greece
- Weekly newspaper: Welt am Sonntag, Germany

== 10. European Newspaper Award (2008) ==
- Local newspaper: Diári de Balears, Spain
- Regional newspaper: Basler Zeitung, Switzerland
- Nationwide newspaper: Svenska Dagbladet, Sweden
- Weekly newspaper: Athens Plus, Greece
- Judges' Special Recognition: nrc•next, the Netherlands

== 11. European Newspaper Award (2009) ==
- Local newspaper: Smålandsposten, Sweden
- Regional newspaper: Stuttgarter Zeitung, Germany
- Nationwide newspaper: i, Portugal
- Judges' Special Recognition: 24 sata, Croatia

== 12. European Newspaper Award (2010) ==
- Local newspaper: Diário de Notícias da Madeira, Portugal
- Regional newspaper: Bergens Tidende, Norway
- Nationwide newspaper: Politiken, Danmark
- Weekly newspaper: Sunday Herald, Scotland
- Judges' Special Recognition: Gealscéal, Ireland
- Judges' Special Recognition: Frankfurter Rundschau iPad, Germany

== 12+1. European Newspaper Award (2011) ==
- Local newspaper: Hordaland, Norway
- Regional newspaper: Berliner Morgenpost, Germany
- Nationwide newspaper: Berlingske, Denmark
- Weekly newspaper: NZZ am Sonntag, Switzerland

== 14. European Newspaper Award (2012) ==
- Local newspaper: Bygdanytt, Norway
- Regional newspaper: El Correo, Spain
- Nationwide newspaper: De Tijd, Belgium
- Nationwide newspaper: Trouw, the Netherlands
- Weekly newspaper: Die Zeit, Germany
- Judges' Special Recognition: Welt am Sonntag Kompakt, Germany

== 15. European Newspaper Award (2013) ==
- Local newspaper: Hallingdølen, Norway
- Regional newspaper: Leeuwarder Courant, the Netherlands
- Nationwide newspaper: de Volkskrant, the Netherlands
- Weekly newspaper: Welt am Sonntag, Germany
- Judges' Special Recognition: Moskovskie Novosti, Russia
- Judges' Special Recognition: público.pt, Portugal

== 16. European Newspaper Award (2014) ==
- Local newspaper: The Mayo News, Ireland
- Regional newspaper: De Twentsche Courant Tubantia, the Netherlands
- Nationwide newspaper: Público, Portugal
- Weekly newspaper: SonntagsZeitung, Switzerland

== 17. European Newspaper Award (2015) ==
- Local newspaper: Kvinnheringen, Norway
- Regional newspaper: Ara, Spain
- Nationwide newspaper: De Morgen, Belgium
- Weekly newspaper: Expresso, Portugal
- Judges' Special Recognition: público.pt, Portugal
- Judges' Special Recognition: Souriatna, Syria

== 18. European Newspaper Award (2016) ==
- Local newspaper: Hufvudstadsbladet, Finland
- Regional newspaper: Het Parool, the Netherlands
- Nationwide newspaper: Politiken, Denmark
- Weekly newspaper: Frankfurter Allgemeine Sonntagszeitung, Germany

== 19. European Newspaper Award (2017) ==
- Local newspaper: Tageblatt, Luxemburg
- Regional newspaper: De Limburger, the Netherlands
- Nationwide newspaper: Handelsblatt, Germany
- Weekly newspaper: Morgenbladet, Norway

== 20. European Newspaper Award (2018) ==
- Local newspaper: Sunnhordland, Norway
- Regional newspaper: Adresseavisen, Norway
- Nationwide newspaper: Het Financieele Dagblad, the Netherlands
- Weekly newspaper: der Freitag, Germany
- Judges' Special Recognition: Ara, Spain
- Judges' Special Recognition: Berliner Morgenpost, Germany
- Judges' Special Recognition: Politiken, Danmark
- Judges' Special Recognition: Stuttgarter Zeitung, Germany

== 21. European Newspaper Award (2019) ==
- Local newspaper: Contacto, Luxembourg
- Regional newspaper: Ara, Spain
- Nationwide newspaper: De Tijd, Belgium
- Weekly newspaper: Expresso, Portugal
- Judges' Special Recognition: Fuldaer Zeitung, Germany

== 22. European Newspaper Award (2020) ==
- Local newspaper: Fædrelandsvennen, Norway
- Regional newspaper: Leeuwarder Courant, The Netherlands
- Nationwide newspaper: Público, Portugal
- Weekly newspaper: Financial Times – FT Weekend, United Kingdom
- Judges' Special Recognition: de Volkskrant, the Netherlands

== 23. European Newspaper Award (2021) ==
- Local newspaper: Hallingdølen, Norway
- Regional newspaper: Ara, Spain
- Nationwide newspaper: De Tijd, Belgium
- Weekly newspaper: Expresso, Portugal
- Judges' Special Recognition: de Volkskrant, the Netherlands
- Judges' Special Recognition: Hamburger Abendblatt, Germany

== 24. European Newspaper Award (2022) ==
- Local Newspaper: Las Provincias, Spain
- Regional Newspaper: Bergens Tidende, Norway
- Nationwide newspaper: De Morgen, Belgium
- Weekly newspaper: NZZ am Sonntag, Switzerland

== 25. European Newspaper Award (2023) ==
- Local Newspaper: Naftemporiki, Greece
- Regional Newspaper: Der Tagesspiegel, Germany
- Nationwide newspaper: NRC, Netherlands
- Weekly newspaper: der Freitag, Germany

== 26. European Newspaper Award (2024) ==
- Local newspaper: JM Madeira, Portugal
- Regional Newspaper: El Periódico (Barcelona), Spain
- Nationwide newspaper: Trouw, Netherlands
- Weekly newspaper: Frankfurter Allgemeine Sonntagszeitung, Germany
