= Lyla and Jasmijn Kok =

Dutch entrepreneurs and twin sisters

Lyla Kok and Jasmijn Kok
- Born: January 1, 1992 (age 34); Delft, Netherlands
- Citizenship: Dutch
- Occupation: Entrepreneurs
- Known for: Co-founders of Nina.care

Lyla Kok and Jasmijn Kok (born 1 January 1992) are Dutch entrepreneurs and twin sisters. They are the founders of Nina.care, the Dutch childcare platform.

In 2021, Kok and Kok took part with their company in the television programme Dragons' Den. In 2022, they were included with Nanny Nina in the Challenger50 list of the entrepreneurship platform MT/Sprout.

== Early life and education ==
Lyla and Jasmijn Kok were born on 1 January 1992. According to MT/Sprout, they started around the age of sixteen with an online calendar to organise their own babysitting work. Lyla Kok studied industrial engineering and worked as Market and Business Analyst at Safran Aerospace at the time, Zodiac Aerospace after which she took on a part-time position as Lecturer at the Delft university whilst the company grew. She switched to working at their company full-time.

Jasmijn studied architecture at Delft University of Technology and worked as architect at KAAN Architecten, as the company grew, she devoted herself full-time to entrepreneurship.

== Career ==
The sisters' activities began with a babysitting network that later grew into Nanny Nina. The company later expanded its services from babysitting to include au pair placement, and the company name was subsequently changed to Nina.care.

By 2022, Nina.care reported revenue of €2.7 million and served roughly a quarter of the Dutch au pair market; the company set a €7 million revenue target for 2023 and outlined plans to expand into Germany and the United Kingdom.

=== Juno artificial womb project ===
Alongside Nina.care, Lyla and Jasmijn Kok co-founded Juno Perinatal Healthcare B.V., a spin-off of Eindhoven University of Technology developing an artificial womb intended to improve survival odds for extremely premature babies. The company grew out of a European research consortium that had received €2.9 million in EU grants in 2019, and was founded together with TU/e professor Guid Oei and researcher Beatrijs van der Hout. Jasmijn took on business development and investor relations for Juno, while Lyla Kok, as an industrial designer, worked on the device itself.

== Recognition and media ==
In 2022, Nanny Nina was included in MT/Sprout's Challenger50; the publication described their platform challenged existing providers in the childcare and au pair market.

In 2023, Lyla and Jasmijn Kok were included in the Role Model Campaign of Equals, an initiative aimed at female role models in technology; in the accompanying profile, they were identified as the founders of Nina.care.

In February 2024, Jasmijn Kok was the main guest on De Ondernemer Live, discussing Nina.care's growth and international ambitions.
