= 4fm =

4fm may refer to:

- 4FM, an Irish radio station now known as Classic Hits
- 4FM, a former Belgian radio station now known as JOE
