= Kadet (TV channel) =

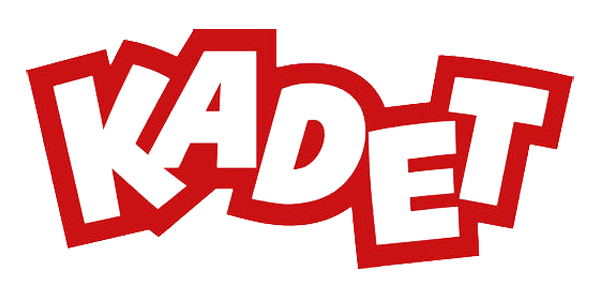
- Country: Belgium
- Headquarters: Vilvoorde, Belgium

Programming
- Picture format: 16:9 576i (SDTV)

Ownership
- Owner: Medialaan (now DPG Media)
- Sister channels: vtm, 2BE

History
- Launched: 18 December 2015
- Replaced: JIM
- Closed: 22 December 2018
- Replaced by: VTM Kids Jr

Links
- Website: www.kadet.be

Availability

Streaming media
- Yelo TV: Watch live (Belgium only)
- TV Overal: Watch live (Belgium only)

Kadet was a Flemish children’s television channel owned by Medialaan–De Persgroep (now DPG Media). The channel launched on 18 December 2015, replacing the youth-oriented channel JIM, which had ceased broadcasting two days earlier. Kadet was positioned primarily as a boys-focused channel, complementing Medialaan’s existing children’s brand vtmKZOOM.

In December 2018, Medialaan announced a full rebranding of its children’s portfolio. As a result, both Kadet and vtmKZOOM were discontinued and replaced by VTM Kids and VTM Kids Jr., marking the end of Kadet as a standalone channel.

== History ==
=== Replacement of JIM ===
After nearly fourteen years on air, the youth channel JIM closed down at midnight on 16 December 2015. Medialaan stated that the teenage audience had largely shifted toward adult entertainment, social media platforms, and online video services, making JIM’s format unsustainable. In response, the company decided to create a new channel targeting a younger demographic.

=== Launch of Kadet ===
Kadet officially launched on 18 December 2015 at 16:00. The channel was designed to cater primarily to children aged 6–12, with an emphasis on animated action programming and adventure-themed content.

To strengthen its programming slate, Medialaan formed a content partnership with The Walt Disney Company, allowing Kadet to broadcast many shows also seen on Disney XD in Belgium.

Daan Van Leeuwen, formerly programmes director for Fox Kids and Jetix Netherlands, was appointed as head of children’s channels within Medialaan. He was tasked with developing both Kadet and VTM Kids and positioning them competitively within the Flemish children’s television market.

=== Rebranding and closure ===
In December 2018, Medialaan announced that its children’s brands would be consolidated. vtmKZOOM and Kadet were retired, and the new channels VTM Kids (general programming) and VTM Kids Jr. (for preschool content) launched shortly thereafter.

The rebranding aimed to simplify the company’s children’s offerings and strengthen the VTM umbrella brand across all age groups.

== Programming ==
Kadet primarily aired animated and live-action series aimed at school-aged children, especially boys. A significant portion of its schedule consisted of content sourced from Disney XD, including action-adventure animation, comedy series, and youth-oriented live-action shows.

=== Typical programming included ===
- Action-adventure animation
- Comedy cartoons
- Superhero-themed series
- Science fiction and fantasy shows
- Live-action adventure series for older children

Although Kadet shared some content similarities with vtmKZOOM, its lineup was positioned as more action-driven and tailored to older children rather than preschool or family-oriented audiences.

== Branding and Presentation ==
Kadet adopted a visual identity aimed at a younger, adventurous demographic, using bold colours, dynamic motion graphics, and playful interstitials. The branding emphasised energy, discovery, and a modern, tech-inspired aesthetic consistent with boy-oriented channels in Europe.

The channel was available via major Flemish cable and digital platforms, including Telenet and Proximus TV.

== Availability ==
Before its closure, Kadet was carried on all major television providers in Flanders and was accessible in standard definition. It also had an online presence through the official Medialaan website, where limited catch-up content and programme information were available.

== See also ==
- vtmKZOOM
- VTM Kids
- VTM Kids Jr.
- DPG Media
- Disney XD
