= Le Soir (magazine) =

Weekly news magazine in Belgium

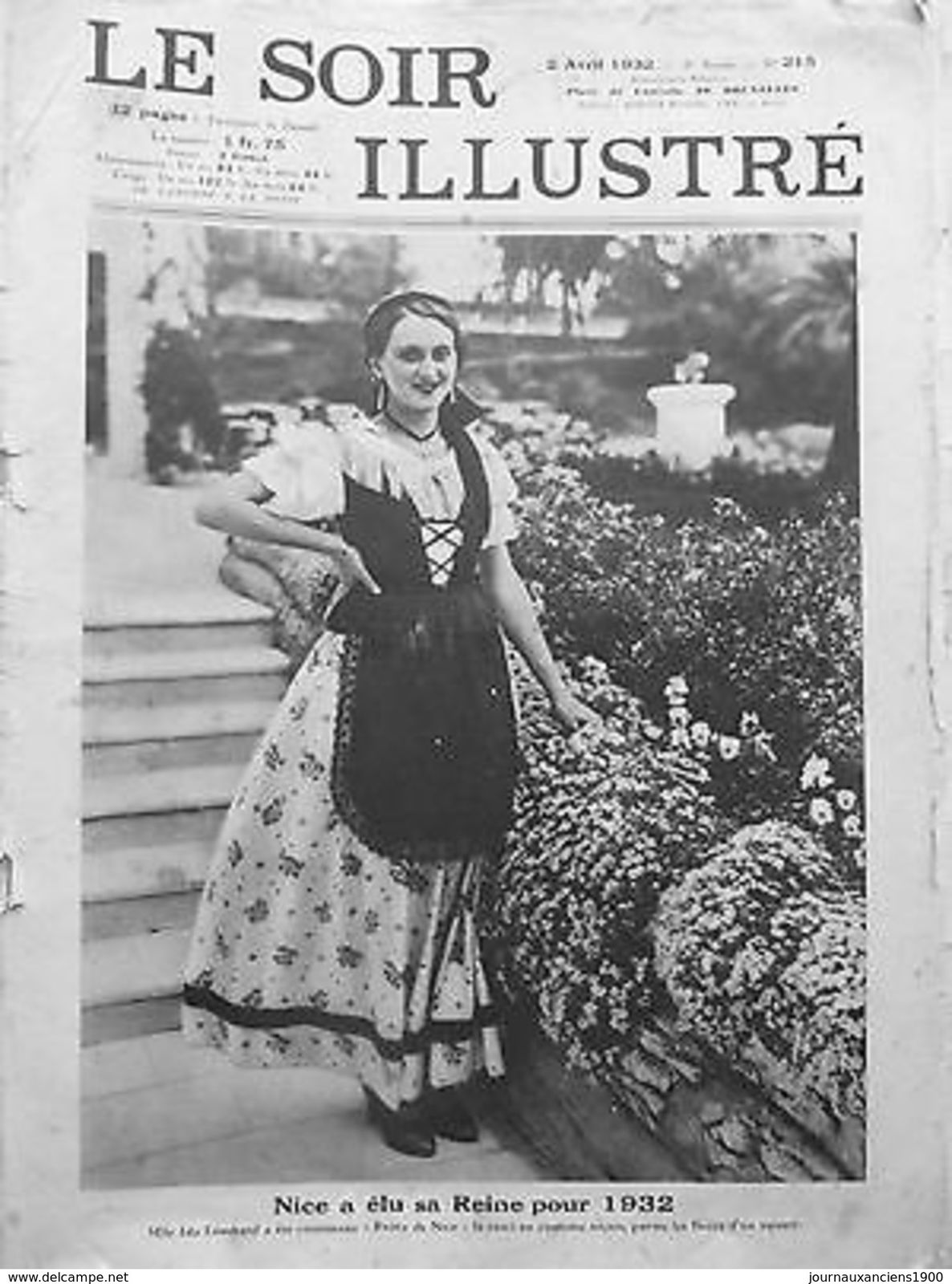
- Le Soir illustré reine de Nice (Queen of Nice, 1932)
- Editor-in-chief: Marc Pasteger
- Categories: News magazine
- Frequency: Weekly
- Publisher: Rossel et Cie SA
- Founded: 1928; 98 years ago
- Company: Rossel Group
- Country: Belgium
- Based in: Brussels
- Language: French
- Website: soirmag.lesoir.be
- ISSN: 1376-4853

Le Soir is a Belgian weekly news magazine published in Brussels. Founded 1928, it is one of the oldest magazines in the country.

== History and profile ==
Le Soir was established in 1928. The magazine is owned and published by Rossel et Cie SA on a weekly basis, and its headquarters is in Brussels. As of 2015 Marc Pasteger was the editor-in-chief of the magazine.

The weekly provides the political, economic, social and cultural news. The magazine also features articles about celebrity news and offers a TV guide.

Between February 2007 and June 2007 Le Soir sold 56,492 copies. The circulation of the weekly was 54.047 copies in 2010 and 56.611 copies in 2011. The magazine sold 56.044 copies in 2012. In 2013 the magazine had a circulation of 55,888 copies.

== See also ==
- List of magazines in Belgium
