= Underground media in the German-occupied Netherlands =

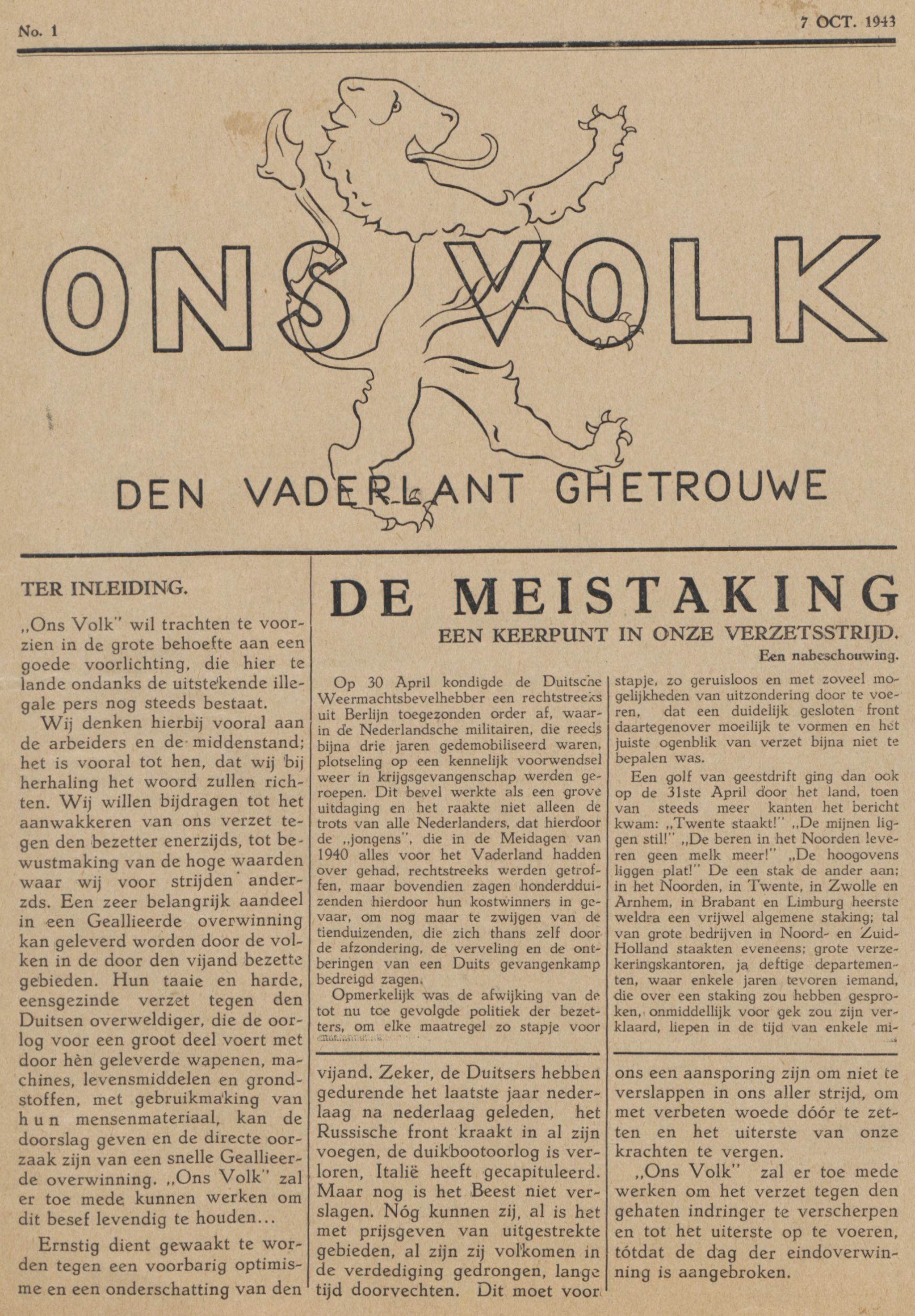
Ons Volk from October 1943

The Dutch underground press was part of the resistance to the German occupation of the Netherlands during World War II, paralleling the emergence of underground media across German-occupied Europe.

After the occupation of the Netherlands in May 1940, the Germans quickly took control over the existing Dutch press and enforced censorship and publication of Nazi propaganda. In response, independent Dutch citizens organized uncensored publishing of their own illegal papers. These papers were cherished by the population, and were better trusted than the official papers. Issues were distributed and passed on, even though there were heavy penalties (including the death penalty) for those involved with illegal anti-Nazi publications.

Some of modern-day Netherlands press and magazine originate from this period, including:

- Trouw,
- Het Parool
- Vrij Nederland

A collection is maintained in the British Library in London and by the NIOD Institute for War, Holocaust and Genocide Studies in Amsterdam.
