= Firda =

Norwegian newspaper

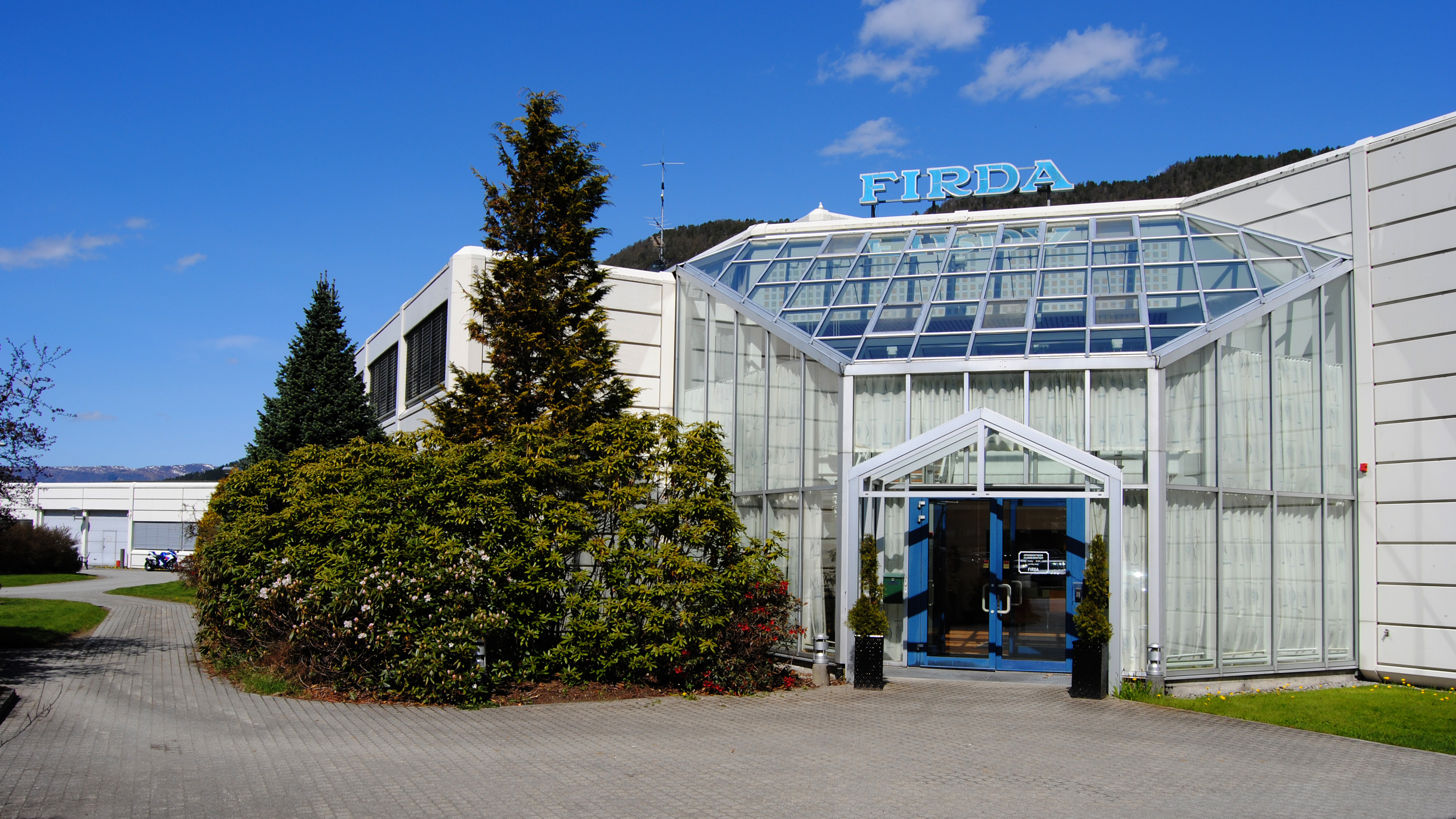
- Type: Daily newspaper
- Owner: Amedia (100%)
- Founder: Kristian Ulltang
- Founded: 1917; 109 years ago
- Language: Norwegian
- Headquarters: Førde
- Circulation: 11,972 (2013)
- Website: Firda

Firda is a Norwegian language daily newspaper, published in the town of Førde which is located in Sunnfjord Municipality in Vestland county, Norway.

== History and profile ==
Firda was founded in 1917 by Kristian Ulltang, who also was its first editor. The paper was published twice per week in the 1960s. Its frequency was six times per week in the 1990s. Its editor-in-chief is Jan Atle Stang.

In 1999 Firda was the recipient of the European Newspaper Award in the category of local newspaper.

At the beginning of the 1960s the circulation of Firda was about 6,000 copies. In the 1990s it had a circulation of about 15,000 copies, making it the major newspaper in Vestland. In 2009 its circulation was 13,500 copies. The 2013 circulation of the paper was 11,972 copies.
