= BiblioLED =

BiblioLED is a Portuguese public library for digital reading and borrowing, launched in January 2025. The borrowing service is accessible 24 hours a day, seven days a week, via smartphones, tablets, online readers and e-readers.

The free borrowing service includes digital books and audiobooks made available through participating municipal libraries that are part of the Portuguese National Network of Public Libraries (RNBP).

Although the largest percentage of books available are in Portuguese, the platform also has ebooks available in English, French and Spanish. In February 2026 the Portuguese newspaper Público reported that more than 70% of BiblioLED users are women between the ages of 24 and 64.

== Operation ==
The BiblioLED catalog consists of a national collection available to all libraries participating in the RNBP and 25 regional collections, accessible only within each Intermunicipal Network and Metropolitan Network. The user must be registered at a public library in a metropolitan or intermunicipal region in order to use the available catalog, and can simultaneously request two books and one audiobook, which are available for 21 days.
