= La Meuse (newspaper) =

Regional newspaper in Belgium

- Type: Regional newspaper
- Format: Tabloid
- Owner(s): Rossel Group
- Publisher: Rossel et Cie S.A.
- Founded: 1856; 169 years ago
- Language: French
- Headquarters: Liège
- Country: Belgium
- Sister newspapers: Le Soir; La Lanterne
- Website: www.lameuse.be

La Meuse (French pronunciation: [la møz]) is a French language regional newspaper published in Liège, Belgium, since 1856.

== History and profile ==
La Meuse was launched in 1856. The paper has its headquarters in Liège and is owned by the Rossel group which also owns Le Soir and La Lanterne, among others. La Meuse is published by Rossel et Cie S.A. in tabloid format. As of 2014 its editor-in-chief was Olympe Gilbart.

In the nineteenth century La Meuse had a progressive liberal political stance. The paper provides business-oriented news.

The paper together with La Lanterne had a circulation of 102,539 copies in 1990 and 97,869 copies in 1991.
