= I (Portuguese newspaper) =

Portuguese daily newspaper

- Type: Daily newspaper
- Format: Compact
- Owner(s): Lena Group
- Founded: 7 May 2009; 16 years ago
- Language: Portuguese
- Headquarters: Lisbon
- Country: Portugal
- Website: ionline.sapo.pt

I (stylised in lowercase; abbreviation for "informação", meaning information in English) is a Portuguese language compact daily newspaper published in Lisbon, Portugal.

== History and profile ==
I was first published on 7 May 2009. The founding company of the paper was Sojormedia group. The paper is part of Lena Group. It has its headquarters in Lisbon.

Martim Avillez Figueiredo was the editor-in-chief of the daily and Mónica Bello served as the editor-in-chief of the online version.

I is published in compact format. The paper covers in-depth news analyzes, reportages and news stories and is composed of four main sections: Opinion, Radar, Zoom and More.

In 2009, I won the European Newspaper Award in the category of nationwide newspapers. The paper was also awarded the World’s Best-Designed™ newspaper by the Society for News Design in 2011.

In May 2009, I had a circulation of 11,000 copies and it was 16,000 copies in August 2009. The circulation of the daily was 10,494 copies in 2010 and 8,939 copies in 2011. The paper sold 6,044 copies in 2012.
