= Tweakers =

Dutch technology website

- Available in: Dutch
- Owner: DPG Media
- Creator: Femme Taken
- Website: tweakers.net
- Commercial: Yes
- Registration: Optional
- Launched: 30 September 1998

Tweakers (formerly called Tweakers.net) is a Dutch technology website featuring news and information about hardware, software, games and the Internet. The name is derived from the verb "tweaking", which is a word used to refer to optimisation of hardware.

Tweakers has grown substantially since its founding in 1998. As of 2023, it publishes news, reviews, features and video reports about technology subjects, with a strong focus on the Netherlands and Belgium.

Tweakers has more features for computer enthusiasts, such as reviews, bi-monthly Best Buy guides, a classifieds section for jobs and used hardware, the Pricewatch and the Shop Survey, among others. While the majority of the reviews are written in Dutch, several articles covering non-standard topics are translated into English.

Tweakers has more than 1.000.000 members and its forum has over 29 million posts. It has won several awards, including "(Dutch) website of the year" in 2009, 2010, 2011, 2012, 2013 and 2014.

== History ==
The website was founded in 1998 by Femme Taken, a computer enthusiast, under the name World of Tweaking as a student's hobby project to offer a Dutch alternative to hardware review sites such as Tom's Hardware Guide.

As of March 2006, Tweakers was taken over by the Dutch media conglomerate VNU, now known as The Nielsen Company. After The Nielsen Company sold its Business Media division to private equity firm 3i, VNU Media became owner of the Tweakers website .

In October 2012, Tweakers launched a new design, designed by Femme Taken, the founder; the community was critical of this change. A couple of days later, Tweakers launched a new feature that enabled the community to change the appearance of the website.

A number of changes and improvements were made in 2014. The current responsive design was introduced on 6 January that year. The Android and iOS apps were removed from their respective stores on 7 October 2014.

In February 2014 Tweakers significantly improved the price comparison tool for sim only contracts.

In June 2014 Tweakers added prices of Belgian webshops to the Pricewatch, which now shows prices from Dutch and Belgian webshops.

Changes continue. In April 2015 Tweakers launched a completely new logo to be uniformly used throughout the website.

== Gathering of Tweakers ==
An important area of the site is the forum. Tweakers's forum is known as the Gathering of Tweakers (often abbreviated as GoT). The forum is focused mainly on technical subjects and tries to maintain a relatively high standard of posting. It has a fairly strong moderation policy, especially when compared to other online discussion forums. Users of the forum are strongly urged to read the FAQ and to have invested a fair amount of his/her own time into finding an answer, either on GoT using the search tools, or anywhere else on the Internet, before asking a question.

== Tweakers Awards ==
Tweakers Awards (formerly known as "Tweakers Gouden Steeksleutel Awards" 2007 to 2011) is a contest in which members can choose the best products from different technology categories.

Tweakers Awards 2022-2023
Category	Product
Best routers	Ubiquiti
Best headsets	Sony
Best cases	Fractal Design
Best case fans	Noctua
Best CPU coolers	Noctua
Best CPUs	AMD
Best electric cars	Tesla, Inc.
Best video game	Hogwarts Legacy
Best gaming monitors	LG
Best gaming headsets	Steelseries
Best gaming laptops	ASUS ROG
Best memory modules	Corsair
Best internet provider BE	Telenet
Best internet provider NL	KPN
Best laptop processors	AMD
Best laptops	Apple Inc.
Best motherboards	ASUS ROG
Best monitors	LG
Best computer mouses	Logitech
Best smart home devices	Philips Hue
Best smartphones	Apple Inc.
Best SSDs	Samsung
Best tablets	Apple Inc.
Best televisions	LG
Best keyboards	Logitech
Best graphics chipsets	Nvidia
Best graphics cards	ASUS ROG
Best power supplies	Corsair
Best wearables	Apple Inc.
Best web shop	Megekko
