= VTM Kids =

- Country: Belgium
- Headquarters: Vilvoorde, Belgium

Programming
- Language: Dutch
- Picture format: 16:9 576i (SDTV)

Ownership
- Owner: DPG Media

History
- Launched: 1 October 2009 (channel); 2 October 2017 (branded block)
- Closed: 9 January 2023; 3 years ago (channel)
- Former names: vtmKzoom (2009-2018)

Links
- Website: vtm.be/vtmgo-kids

Availability

Streaming media
- Yelo TV: Watch live (Belgium only)
- TV Overal: Watch live (Belgium only)

VTM Kids (formerly known as VTMKzoom) is a Belgian children’s programming block. The broadcasts of the block began on 1 October 2017 on VTM. VTM Kids was also a channel until 2023.

== History ==
The children channel VTM Kzoom was launched on 1 October 2009.

vtmKzoom logo (2018)

Since 15 February 2015, children's programmes have been broadcast on VTM in the morning again. Initially only on weekends, but since 3 July 2017 every day. Since 2 October 2017, the morning block is called VTM Kids. The block broadcasts repeats of vtmKzoom and Kadet.

On 22 December 2018 vtmKzoom and Kadet were replaced by the channels VTM Kids and VTM Kids Jr. Most of the programmes of vtmKzoom and Kadet were moved to VTM Kids. The toddler and pre-school programmes from vtmKzoom were moved to VTM Kids Jr.

On 22 January 2020, DPG Media announced that VTM Kids Jr. would be merged with VTM Kids into a single channel. On 2 March 2020, VTM Kids Jr. was replaced by CAZ 2.

On 9 January 2023, VTM Kids ceased broadcasting as a linear channel. The programs still broadcast during the VTM Kids program block in the morning on VTM and remain available via VTM GO.

The VTM Kids linear channel was replaced by the FAST channel VTM Non-Stop (initially as VTM Non-Stop Dokters, featuring medical dramas), on 9 January 2023.

== Programming ==
Most programs that are broadcast on VTM Kids are from the Flemish production companies Studio 100, Seamonster and Sultan Sushi. This list is incomplete.

=== Flemish children shows ===
- Booh
- De Wereld van K3
- Kabouter Plop
- My Name is Michael
- The Voice Kids
- vtmKzoom Hitlist
- vtmKzoom Pop
- vtmKzoom Pop Artiest

=== Imported children shows ===
- All Hail King Julien
- Annedroids
- Atomic Puppet
- Bakugan: Battle Planet
- Bananas in Pyjamas
- Bannertail: The Story of Gray Squirrel
- Bob the Builder
- Calimero
- Cavegirl
- Danger Mouse
- Dinotrux
- DreamWorks Dragons
- Fantasy Patrol
- Fireman Sam
- G.I. Joe: Renegades
- Harry & Bunnie
- Harry and His Bucket Full of Dinosaurs
- Heidi
- Heidi, Girl of the Alps
- Home: Adventures with Tip & Oh
- Hot Wheels Battle Force 5
- Kick Buttowski: Suburban Daredevil
- Kitty Is Not a Cat
- Lassie
- Littlest Pet Shop
- Lost in Oz
- Martin Morning
- Maya the Bee
- Meteor and the Mighty Monster Trucks
- Miffy's Adventures Big and Small
- My Little Pony: Friendship Is Magic
- Odd Squad
- Pingu
- Pippi Longstocking
- Pieter Post (season 6–8)
- Pokémon
- Polly Pocket
- Pound Puppies
- Sally Bollywood
- Simsala Grimm
- Sunny Bunnies
- Talking Tom & Friends
- Teletubbies
- Spirit Riding Free
- The Amazing Spiez!
- The Adventures of Puss in Boots
- The Blocks
- The Busy World of Richard Scarry
- The Donkey Kong Show
- The Epic Tales of Captain Underpants
- The Spooktacular New Adventures of Casper
- The Wild Adventures of Blinky Bill
- Thomas & Friends
- Transformers: Cyberverse
- Vicky the Viking
- Wendy
- YooHoo and Friends
- Zigby

== VTMKzoom+ ==
VTMKzoom+ was a digital addition to VTMKzoom which broadcast 24/24. The channel was accessible via the red button on the remote control of the digital TV.

The pay channel was available from 1 October 2009 via Telenet Digital TV, 24h/24. From 23 September 2013 the channel was no longer included in the new paying packages of Telenet. Only customers who were still subscribed to the old "kids package" can watch it.

The channel closed down on 1 June 2016.
