= Dag Allemaal =

Flemish weekly family and women's magazine

- Editor-in-chief: Ilse Beyers
- Categories: Women's magazine; Television magazine
- Frequency: Weekly
- Publisher: De Persgroep Publishing NV
- Founded: 1984; 42 years ago
- Company: DPG Media
- Country: Belgium
- Based in: Schelle
- Language: Dutch
- Website: Dag Allemaal

Dag Allemaal is a Flemish weekly family and women's magazine published in Schelle, Belgium. The magazine also provides TV and radio guides.

== History and profile ==
Dag Allemaal was established in 1984. The magazine is part of De Persgroep media group and is published by De Persgroep Publishing NV on a weekly basis. De Persgroep Publishing NV is part of Magnet Magazines, a subsidiary of De Persgroep. The weekly has its headquarters in Schelle.

Dag Allemaal offers entertainment news in addition to TV and radio guides. The magazine has a children magazine, Dag Kids. Belgian caricaturist Marec has been among the contributors for Dag Allemaal since 1994.

As of 2004 Ilse Beyers was the editor-in-chief of Dag Allemaal.

== Circulation ==
During the period of 2006-2007 Dag Allemaal had a circulation of 278,000 copies. The circulation of the magazine was 504,192 copies during the first quarter of 2009. Its circulation fell to 423,103 copies in 2010 and to 412,809 copies in 2011. The weekly had a circulation of 396,097 copies in 2012. It was the best-selling magazine in Belgium with a circulation of 349,165 copies in 2013.

== See also ==
- List of magazines in Belgium
