= Östersunds-Posten =

Swedish local newspaper

- Type: Local newspaper
- Format: Half Nordic
- Owner: MittMedia Förvaltning AB
- Founded: 1877; 149 years ago
- Political alignment: Center-right
- Language: Swedish
- Headquarters: Östersund
- Country: Sweden
- ISSN: 1104-0386
- Website: ÖP

Östersunds-Posten, simply ÖP, is a Swedish language local newspaper published in Östersund, Sweden. The paper has been in circulation since 1877.

== History and profile ==
Östersunds-Posten was established in 1877. Its headquarters is in Östersund. The Erfa-group was the owner of the paper until 1975 when it was acquired by the Centertidningar, a media company owned by the Center Party. The paper was sold to a newspaper consortium, including the companies of Stampen, Mittmedia, and Eskilstunakuriren and became part of MittMedia Förvaltning AB.

The political leaning of Östersunds-Posten is center-right. The paper was published in broadsheet format until Fall 2004 when it began to be published in half Nordic format. It has a weekend supplement, Lørdag.

The paper started its website in 1994. In 2005 Östersunds-Posten was named as the Europe's Best Designed Newspaper and awarded the European Newspaper Award in the category of local newspapers.

== Circulation ==
In 2010 Östersunds-Posten sold 26,400 copies. The circulation of the paper fell to 23,400 copies in 2012 and to 21,800 copies in 2013.
