= Mediafin =

Belgian media company

Mediafin is a Belgian media group. The company was established in 2005 when it was bought by De Persgroep and Rossel. Its name was switched from Publisher Tijd to Mediafin. De Persgroep and Rossel hold a fifty percent stake in Mediafin.

In 2018, De Persgroep sold its 50 percent stake in Mediafin to Flemish media group Roularta, who in return sold its 50 percent stake in Medialaan to De Persgroep for 217.5 million euros in cash.

Mediafin acquired the B2B data platform openthebox in 2022. openthebox aggregates and visualized public company data on more than 3 million companies, with a focus on banking, private equity and M&A. As of 2025, Mediafin fully owns openthebox.

The company is based in Brussels. It publishes two daily newspapers: De Tijd (in Dutch) and L'Echo (in French), and two weekly magazines for investors: De Belegger (in Dutch) and L'Investisseur (in French).
