= Paul Sérieux =

French psychiatrist (1864–1947)

Paul Sérieux (French: [se.ʁjø]; 1864–1947) was a French psychiatrist.

Paul Sérieux was born in Le Havre on 4 July 1864. His family relocated to Paris when he was a child and he studied medicine in Paris, defending his thesis in 1888.

He practiced medicine in several French hospitals and asylums during his career, including the Asylum of Ville-Evrard and the Sainte-Anne hospital. He also worked as a physician at the Asylum of Marsens in Switzerland.

Sérieux is best known for research of psychoses and delusional thought processes, and his collaborative work with Joseph Capgras (1873–1950). With Capgras, he described a type of non-schizophrenic, paranoid psychosis called délire d’interprétation, which is defined as a "chronic interpretive psychosis". Sérieux was also instrumental in introducing the theories of German psychiatrist Emil Kraepelin (1856–1926) into French psychiatry.

With his one-time mentor Valentin Magnan (1835–1916), he co-authored the book Le délire chronique a evolution systématique (1892), and in 1909 with Capgras, he published a treatise called Les folies raisonnantes. Sérieux traveled widely throughout Europe, and created an extensive report on the state and conditions of psychiatric treatment in French, German, Swiss and Belgian mental asylums.

== Works by Paul Sérieux ==
- 1904. L'Année Psychologique.,10, 532 : Paul Sérieux, 1903, Clinique psychiatrique de l’Université de Giessen (Grand Duché de Hesse), Arch. de neurologie, juillet, p. 15-31. (in French)

== Works on Paul Sérieux ==
- Haustgen, Thierry (2014). "Paul Sérieux (1864–1947), clinicien, historien et réformateur de l'hôpital psychiatrique". Annales médico-psychologiques (in French). 172 (9): 785–793. doi:10.1016/j.amp.2014.10.005.
