= Joseph Capgras =

French psychiatrist (1873–1950)

- Born: 23 August 1873; Verdun-sur-Garonne, France
- Died: 27 January 1950 (aged 76); Paris, France
- Known for: Discovery of and research on the Capgras delusion
- Scientific career
- Fields: Medicine; Psychiatry

Jean Marie Joseph Capgras (August 23, 1873 – January 27, 1950) was a French psychiatrist best known for describing the delusional disorder that bears his name. He received his medical degree in Toulouse, and later worked in several mental institutions in France until his work was interrupted by the Great War. From 1929 to 1936, he was associated with the Hôpital Sainte-Anne where he remained until his retirement.

Capgras and his mentor, Paul Sérieux (1864–1947), described their clinical findings in some significant publications. In 1902, they published Les Psychoses à Base d'Interprétations Délirantes (Psychosis Based on Delusional Interpretations). In 1909, they published Les Folies Raisonnantes (The Reasoning of Follies). Through this research, Capgras and Sérieux described a type of non-schizophrenic, paranoid psychosis referred to as Delerium of Interpretation.

In 1923, Capgras delusion was described in a study published by Capgras and his intern, Jean Reboul-Lachaux, titled L'illusion des "Sosies" Dans un Délire Dystématisé Chronique (The Illusion of Doubles in a Chronic Systematized Delusion). In this publication, Capgras's reported his first case, Mme. M., who had complex mental illness but the focus of the report was her eponymous delusion (Sinkman, 2008). Mme. M. believed that her husband, children, and many other relations had been abducted, poisoned, murdered, and replaced with doubles. Capgras recognized that her term “doubles” referred to people who looked identical to her known family and friends. Capgras wrote, “This belief in doubles, frequent as it is, can be seen as an accessory symptom in the delusions of persecution, in the form of misrecognition associated with a mistaken interpretation.” This quote demonstrates how he related this disorder to agnosia, more specifically prosopagnosia (Capgras & Reboul-Lachaux, 1923).

In 1931, Capgras was appointed the president of the Société Médico-Psychologique (The Medical-Psychological Society) for his case studies and journal articles. While in this role, he was able to reunite two branches that had separated 25 years earlier.
