= De Tijd =

Dutch-language Belgian business newspaper

- Logo

- Front page of De Tijd on 7 May 2025
- Type: Daily newspaper
- Format: Berliner
- Owner: Mediafin
- Editor: Peter De Groote
- Founded: 1968; 58 years ago
- Language: Dutch
- Headquarters: Havenlaan 86C, Box 309, 1000 City of Brussels, Brussels-Capital Region, Belgium
- Sister newspapers: L'Echo
- Website: www.tijd.be

De Tijd (Dutch: [də ˈtɛit]; lit. 'The Times') is a Belgian daily newspaper that mainly focuses on business and economics. It is published by Mediafin and mainly distributed in Flanders and Brussels. It is the Flemish counterpart of the French-language daily L'Echo, which is its sister paper.

== History and profile ==
Established as De Financieel-Economische Tijd (lit. 'The Financial Economic Times') in 1968, in 2003 the paper was renamed as De Tijd.

De Tijd has been printed on salmon pink paper since May 2009, following the example of its colleagues Financial Times, Het Financieele Dagblad, FT Deutschland and many more.

De Tijd is owned by De Persgroep (50%) and Rossel (50%). The current editor-in-chief of De Tijd is Stephanie De Smedt. It is published in the Dutch language.

De Tijd is a typical financial daily, covering economy and business, financial markets and national and international politics. The paper is the main information source for Belgian managers (CIM-survey 2009). It is published from Tuesday to Saturday with no Sunday or Monday edition. The weekend edition is enriched with two magazines: Netto, on personal finance, and Sabato on lifestyle.

In March 2012 the paper began to be published in Berliner format.

De Tijd was named as the Newspaper of the Year in the category of nationwide newspaper by the European Newspapers Congress in 2012.

== Mediafin ==
De Tijd was established and financially supported by the Vlaams Economisch Verbond. In 2005, two major Belgian media conglomerates, the Flemish De Persgroep which is the owner of Het Laatste Nieuws and De Morgen among others and the Walloon Rossel which is the owner of Le Soir among others purchased Uitgeversbedrijf Tijd, the mother company of De Tijd and Editeco, the publishing company of L'Echo, the French counterpart. Both newspapers were integrated in the newly established Mediafin, in which De Persgroep and Rossel each hold a stake of 50 percent. Both newspapers stayed independent, but they work in the same building at the historical site of Tour & Taxis in Brussels since the merger. Frederik Delaplace was editorial director of Mediafin.

== Circulation ==
The circulation of De Tijd was 59,144 copies and its market share was 4.7% in 2002. The circulation of the paper was 39,315 copies in 2008 and 36,569 copies in 2009. It was 37,448 copies in 2010, 39,431 copies in 2011 and a total circulation of 41.065 (digital+print) in 2015.

According to the Centrum voor Informatie over de Media, (CIM) De Tijd had a total paid for distribution of 37,031 copies at the end of 2011. It reached 123.300 readers every day. De Tijd had an average market share of 6,4% in Flanders.

The newspaper has been investing in multimedia projects since 2007. The website of De Tijd now reaches about 150.000 unique visitors a day. The website has a (frequency based) paid for model since May 2010. The newspaper is also available via mobile, it has apps for both iPad and iPhone and a html-based app for other tablets.

According to CIM, in 2018–2019, De Tijd recorded 568,700 readers, combining the digital and paper versions.

== Slogans ==
- Het Lijfblad van de Manager (1968–1996).
- Voor kennis van Zaken (1996–2002).
- Uit op Inzicht (2002–2003).
- De Essentie (2003–2006).
- Voor kennis van Zaken (2006–2007).
- Tel mee (2008-2010)
- Voor belangrijke zaken neemt u De Tijd (since 2010)
