= La Capitale =

Belgian daily regional newspaper

La Capitale (French pronunciation: [la kapital]) is a Belgian daily regional newspaper, specializing in the region around Brussels and published in French. It is part of the Sud Presse group. The paper is published by Rossel & Cie, S.A. and is based in Brussels.
