= Frank Molnar =

Hungarian-born Canadian artist (1936–2020)

Frank Molnar (1936-2020) was a Hungarian-born Canadian artist. Fleeing to the United States as a result of the Hungarian Revolution of 1956, he studied at the Pennsylvania Academy of Fine Arts before moving to Vancouver, Canada in 1962. An oil painter and watercolourist, he was one of the first instructors at Capilano College's art and design college, where his students included Charles van Sandwyk.
