= Trouw =

Dutch newspaper

- Front page of Trouw on 27 March 2010
- Type: Daily newspaper
- Format: Compact
- Owner: DPG Media
- Editor-in-chief: Cees van der Laan
- Founded: 18 February 1943; 83 years ago
- Language: Dutch
- Headquarters: Jacob Bontiusplaats 9
- City: Amsterdam
- Country: Netherlands
- Circulation: 102,631 (as of 2017)
- Website: trouw.nl

Trouw (Dutch pronunciation: [trʌu]; lit. 'loyal, true') is a Dutch daily newspaper appearing in compact size. It was founded in 1943 as an orthodox Protestant underground newspaper during World War II. Since 2009, it has been owned by DPG Media (known as De Persgroep until 2019). Trouw received the European Newspaper Award in 2012. Cees van der Laan is the current editor-in-chief.

== History ==
Trouw is a Dutch word meaning "fidelity", "loyalty", or "allegiance", and is cognate with the English adjective "true". The name was chosen to reflect allegiance and loyalty to God and country in spite of the German occupation of the Netherlands.

Trouw was started during World War II by members of the Dutch Protestant resistance against the German occupation. Hundreds of people involved in the production and distribution of the newspaper were arrested and killed during the war. The newspaper was published irregularly during the war due to lack of paper. In 1944 the German forces tried to stop publication by rounding up and imprisoning some 23 of the couriers. They issued an ultimatum to the leaders of Trouw; however, the editors did not give in and all of the captured couriers were executed. Amongst the people that lost their life during the war due to their involvement with the newspaper was Trouw co-founder and resistance member Wim Speelman.

After the war the paper became a daily, its allegiance to the Reformed Churches in the Netherlands. By 1967, though, the paper's chief editor made it clear that Trouw was not to be considered a paper only for Christians: it wanted to be a paper for everyone. In the course of time the percentage of Trouw readers that belong to the Reformed churches shrank considerably: in 1965 69% of readers belonged to one of those churches, but by 1979 this had dropped to 48%, and by 1999 to 28%. In their own words, in 2005, they intended to "remain a newspaper rooted in a Christian tradition and to be a source of contemplation and inspiration for everyone, churchgoer or not, who feels a need for moral and spiritual orientation."

Circulation at the end of the 20th century was a little over 133,000. On 3 February 2005, Trouw changed its format from broadsheet to compact.

Currently, Trouw is a part of the De Persgroep Nederland, the name given to the former PCM group after the Belgian publishing house De Persgroep bought a majority stake in PCM in the summer of 2009. NRC Handelsblad, Het AD, Het Parool and de Volkskrant are also owned by De Persgroep Nederland. NRC Handelsblad was sold before the summer of 2010.
