= Joe (Belgian radio station) =

Dutch language radio station in Belgium

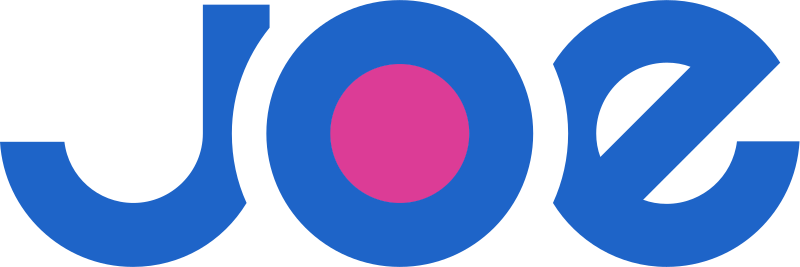
- Vilvoorde; Belgium
- Broadcast area: Flanders
- Frequency: See list

Programming
- Language: Dutch
- Format: Oldies, Adult contemporary music

Ownership
- Owner: DPG Media
- Sister stations: Qmusic, Willy

History
- First air date: 1 April 2009
- Former names: 4fm (2001–2009); Joe FM (2009–2016)

Links
- Website: joe.be

Joe is a commercial Belgian radio station broadcasting in Dutch, and is mainly dedicated to pop music from the 1970s, 1980s, 1990s and 2000s. Since 2007 the radio station has been owned by DPG Media.

Joe mainly plays hit music from the 1980s to the present. According to the latest figures from the CIM, Joe achieved an average market share of 12,3% on a daily basis.

== History ==
On 27 October 2001, Joe's predecessor 4FM was launched. Together with Q-music, it was the first commercial radio station to be licensed as a national broadcaster in the Flemish Community. The station was purchased by Talpa Media in 2005. In May 2007, 4fm was taken over by DPG Media - then known as the Vlaamse Media Maatschappij. In 2008, 4fm started broadcasting a news-focused breakfast show named 4fm actueel that was simulcast on KANAALTWEE, owned by former Joe owner, Medialaan. It was axed a few months later.

On 19 February 2009, the hosts of 4fm announced that the station would relaunch as Joe FM on 1 April 2009. The station's format largely stayed the same. On Saturdays and Sundays, a show called Joekes broadcast excerpts of standup sets and comedy skits. In August 2012, Joe FM changed its slogan to Your Greatest Hits and implemented several new programmes.

In September 2023, following the launch of Joe on FM in the Netherlands, the Belgian counterpart changed its slogan again, this time to Good Times, Great Music. The main color of the station also switched from green to blue.

== Frequencies ==
Joe broadcasts in the Flemish Community (Flanders and Brussels) on the following frequencies:

- Aalst: 104.2 MHz
- Antwerp: 103.4 MHz
- Beringen: 98.4 MHz
- Bree: 93.5 MHz
- Brussegem: 95.6 MHz
- Brussels: 103.4 MHz
- Dendermonde: 92.2 MHz
- Diest: 103.3 MHz
- Egem: 104.1 MHz
- Geel: 93.5 MHz
- Genk: 103.4 MHz
- Ghent: 92.8 MHz
- Herzele: 90.9 MHz
- Heusden-Zolder: 88.8 MHz
- Holsbeek: 90.3 MHz
- Kasterlee: 91.4 MHz
- Leuven: 99.7 MHz
- Lommel: 103.7 MHz
- Mechelen: 96.7 MHz
- Ninove: 99.7 MHz
- Sint-Niklaas: 93.5 MHz
- Sint-Pieters-Leeuw: 95.5 MHz
- Sint-Truiden: 89.2 MHz
- Temse: 93.5 MHz
- Tongeren: 89.1 MHz
- Turnhout: 90.6 MHz
- Wuustwezel: 103.7 MHz

The station is also available via DAB+, digital TV and online streams.
