= Metro (Belgian newspaper) =

Belgian free daily newspaper

Metro was a free newspaper in Belgium, distributed on working days and aiming in particular at 18- to 44-year-old urban, active, mobile students and commuters. Separate Dutch and French-language versions, each with its own content, were according to the area's language(s) available in railway stations, subway stations, universities, etc. from dedicated stands that had the colour of the paper's header: blue for Dutch and green for French for easy recognition, especially where both occur.

The publisher was N.V. Mass Transit Media, located in the centre of the City of Brussels. The legal publisher was the company's General Manager Monique Raafels with an address in Antwerp. Its chief editor (Content Director) was Stefan Van Reeth.

In the period of 2001-2002 the paper had a circulation of 200,000 copies. On an ordinary Thursday, 10 May 2007, its 1,455th issue in Dutch version as always mentioned the number of prints, which was 265,000. Having over 800,000 readers, it claimed to be the second largest newspaper of the country.

It has an online presence, where breaking news and entertainment are posted. When Metro was published on paper, a complete online version of the newspaper was available in PDF format as well as a slightly simpler layout in ordinary HTML.

Metro's revenue came from advertising. Its news sources are mainly the longstanding Belgian press agency Belga, Associated Press (AP), and Agence France-Presse (AFP); the legal rights to its pictures are with Belga and AP (unless otherwise specified). The model's reliance on other news sources remained controversial, as Metro journalists were not allowed to leave the redaction for field work, as this was deemed too expensive.

In October 2023, publisher Rossel announced its intent to terminate Metro, after the newspaper had recorded financial losses 4 consecutive years. The Coronavirus outbreak and associated lockdowns of 2020 - 2021 were cited as the cause, with the transition to a permanently increased number of readers working from home reducing the advertising revenue. Until 2022, the newspaper was published 5 days a week, the last year this was reduced to 3 days per week. The news of termination came as a surprise to many readers, after the newspaper had received a significant overhaul of its looks in March 2023. The last edition of Metro was published on 27 October 2023. The website remains accessible until 15 January 2024.
