= Qmusic (Flanders) =

- Vilvoorde; Belgium
- Broadcast area: Belgium (Flanders)
- Frequencies: Limburg FM 102.5 MHz; Antwerp FM 99.2 MHz; Flemish Brabant FM 103.1 MHz; West Flanders FM 103.0 MHz; East Flanders FM 88.6 MHz

Programming
- Format: CHR/Hot AC (1980s-today)

Ownership
- Owner: DPG Media
- Sister stations: Joe, Willy

History
- First air date: 12 November 2001

Links
- Webcast: Webstream; Webcam; Playlist
- Website: www.qmusic.be

Qmusic (formerly Q-music) is a Flemish commercial radio station of media company DPG Media. In 2016, Qmusic is the biggest commercial radio station and the third largest radio station in Flanders. According to the latest listening figures from the Centrum voor Informatie over de Media (English: Centre for Information on the Media), the station achieves on a daily basis an average market share of 12.95%.

The station plays particularly popular music. Since 20 February 2012 all activities are filmed in the radio studio and broadcast live via the website, a private TV channel on Telenet Digital TV and a mobile application for the smartphone.

== History ==
=== 2001–2015: Q-music - Q is good for you ===
On 12 November 2001 Q-music went nationwide in the ether at 6am. Two months earlier, the broadcaster with 4fm (now JOE fm ) recognized as a national commercial radio by the Flemish Community. To radio to gain experience, VMMa (later called Medialaan, now DPG Group) worked until 2003 along with local radio stations for Top Radio and Radio Mango.

The first broadcast on Q-music was the Deckers en Ornelis Ochtendshow with Erwin Deckers and Sven Ornelis, a program that previously ran on the former competing radio station Radio Donna (now MNM). The program was very popular and there was after the switch from Deckers Ornelis be the strongman of Q-music, which worked. Until the summer of 2015 Sven Ornelis continued to present the same morning block, albeit with a different co-presenter after Deckers in 2008 chose a function behind the scenes. From autumn 2008 to spring 2014 Ornelis formed a duo with Kürt Rogiers, Rogiers was succeeded in late 2014 by Maarten Vancoillie.

In the spring of 2006, Q-music Wim Oosterlinck moved to the former strongman competitor Studio Brussel. Oosterlinck had since on Q-music for 9 years the fixed presenter during the evening rush.

=== 2015–present: Qmusic - You make us Q ===
On 31 August 2015 there was a major renovation of the station, which shall include the name was changed to Qmusic (without hyphen) and with You make us Q a new slogan was introduced. The program schedule is thereby thoroughly renovated. As Sven Ornelis swaps the morning show for another program for the first time since the start of the station. Maarten Vancoillie and Dorothee Dauwe who presented the morning program with Sven the previous season, will only continue there now with it in Dauwe en Vancoillie. Except Ornelis, also presents fixture Wim Oosterlinck now at a new time. As his successor in the evening rush hour was with Sam De Bruyn attracted another strong competitor holder of Studio Brussel. In the evening and weekend programming, where previously mostly average broadcasts were made, since the renovation more space for alternative music. Finally, there is greater focus on the interaction with the audience, including from a new daily program on request noon.

== Presenters ==
Of the original presenters of the station, only Sven Ornelis and Bart-Jan Depraetere remains in 2015. Other voices from the very beginning, included Herbert Bruynseels and Carl Schmitz, who now both work for sister station JOE fm.

=== Current presenters ===
- Rik Boey
- Anke Buckinx
- Marcia Bwarody
- Born Meirlaen
- Dorothee Dauwe
- Sam De Bruyn
- Bart-Jan Depraetere
- Sean Dhondt
- Vincent Fierens
- Violette Goemans
- An Lemmens
- Marie Monballiu
- Jolien Roets
- Wim Oosterlinck
- Sven Ornelis
- Elias Smekens
- Toon Smet
- Loïc Thaler
- Maarten Vancoillie
- Shalini Van den Langenbergh
- Vincent Vangeel
- Arne Vanhaecke
- Heidi Van Tielen
- Peter Verhoeven (radio personality)

Without a regular program:

- Felice Dekens
- Serge De Marre
- Evi Geysels
- Kenneth Stevens
- Jan Thans

=== Former presenters ===
- Dorianne Aussems
- Herbert Bruynseels
- Séverine Champeaux
- Erwin Deckers
- Jolien De Greef
- Anneke De Keersmaeker
- Frederika Del Nero
- Nathalie Delporte
- Eline De Munck
- Yasmina El Messaoudi
- Jenno Hallaert
- Wine Lauwers
- Kris Mannaerts
- Kristin Moers
- Johan Notenbaert
- Hans Otten
- Xander Peeters
- Astrid Philips
- Elke Plancke
- Alexandra Potvin
- Kürt Rogiers
- Carl Schmitz
- Kenny Smet
- Sara Steegen
- Elke Vanelderen
- Francesca Vanthielen
- Erika Van Tielen
- Bjorn Verhoeven
- Steffi Vertriest

=== Q-academy ===
Since 2008, the station offers with the project Q-academy regularly some young people the chance, after an audition and subsequent selection process, internally to get training as a radio DJ. Those who complete the course successfully, on request, gets a job as a radio producer. Often they are taking up their duties presenter of a night program, after which a further advancement to a printer listened time belongs to the possibilities.

Of the current presenters on Qmusic, several owe their jobs to the aforementioned training. These include Maarten Vancoillie, Jolien Roets, Jan Thans, Vincent Fierens, Felice Dekens and Marcia Bwarody.

== Events ==
=== Qparty ===
About once a month the station organizes the so-called Qparty, a big party held each time in a different location in Flanders. The night is always followed by three DJ sets of Qmusic presenters, today's regular trio Maarten Vancoillie, Bart-Jan Depraetere and Sven Ornelis.

=== Foute Party ===
Years of fixture in the programming of the channel, was a daily morning hour which was marked by bad music. The line drawn through every last Friday of June at De Foute Dag. During the day, then a chart sent with wrong numbers, titled De Foute 128, and in the evening the whole concludes with the Foute Party, the biggest party with bad music, which can accommodate about 20,000 visitors. Over the years, the Foute Party alternately organized in Flanders Expo in Ghent and in the Ethias Arena in Hasselt.

=== Q-Beach House ===
Since 2006, the station makes radio from a temporary radio studio in July and August every day between 10:00 and 22:00 (23:00 during events) on the beach in Ostend, which the Q-Beach House is called. Besides the radio studio also features a terrace bar where anyone can come without obligation. Around the studio, the speakers does the radio broadcast resound on the terrace and the adjacent beach area.

In fine weather, the presenters pulls up during programs sometimes the terrace, the beach or the seawall to organize to interact with listeners and passers-by and, for example, a match. In the evening at sunset on the beach regularly organized a Sunset Concert, a performance of a popular music artist or band. Since 2013 is also held every Friday night at the Q-Beach House a Que Pasa Party, a half-hour beach party as part of the radio show Que Pasa.

=== The Qube ===
Qmusic regularly invites emerging artists to give a free introductory concert for a very limited number of listeners. These concerts take place in the air outside the Qube, a space adjacent to the radio studio. In many cases, the tickets will be given away on the basis of a match.

== Hit ==
- De Foute 128
- iTunes Top 40
- Top 40 Hitlist
- Top 500 van de 90's
- Top 500 van de Zeroes

== See also ==
- JOE fm, the sister station Q-music
- Que Pasa, a current program of Q-music
