= La Lanterne (newspaper) =

Defunct newspaper in France

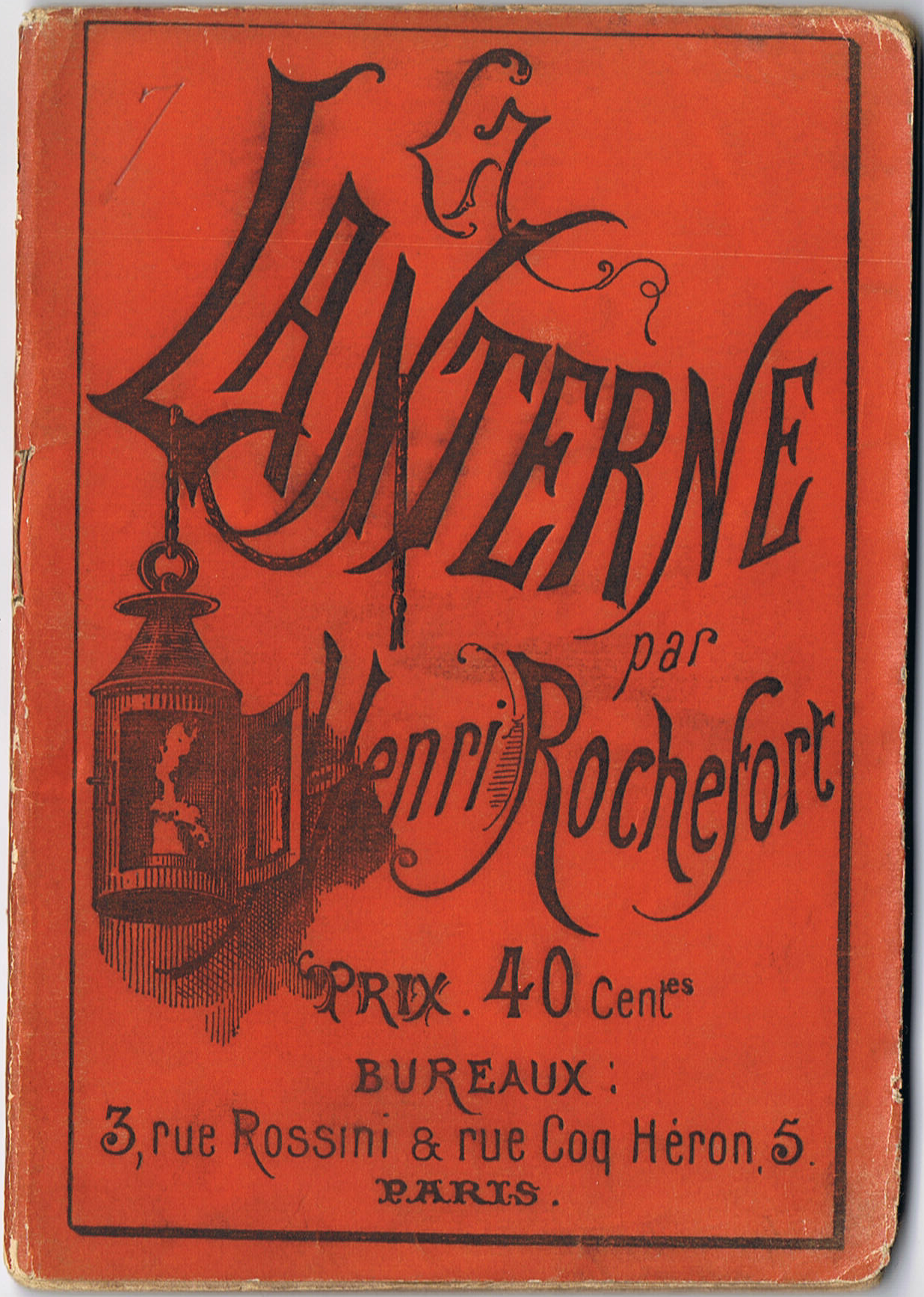
- Type: Weekly newspaper
- Founded: 1868
- Ceased publication: 1876
- Language: French
- City: Paris, then Brussels
- Country: France, then Belgium
- Circulation: Between 15.000 and 120.000 copies

La Lanterne (French pronunciation: [la lɑ̃tɛʁn]) was a satiric weekly newspaper edited by Henri Rochefort.

Created in 1868, La Lanterne was sold clandestinely before ceasing publication in 1876. The title La Lanterne was reissued in 1877.

== Description ==
With the support of Hippolyte de Villemessant, La Lanterne was created to distance Henri Rochefort from Le Figaro, where the tone of his articles displeased the authorities. Published weekly, it was a small, red brochure measuring 14.5 cm by 10 cm (5.7 in by 3.9 in). The selling price was relatively high at 40 centimes. Some issues sold for 15 to 20 francs.

The first issue of La Lanterne was published in Paris on May 31, 1868, with 15,000 copies printed. It was popular in Paris and the provinces and investors were soon repaid. Due to high demand, the issue was reprinted several times, eventually reaching a total circulation of 120,000.

The first issue began with the now-famous editorial phrase, "France contains thirty-six million subjects, excluding the subjects of discontent."

Two separate series were published, with a five-year break between November 1869 and July 1874:

- The first series consisted of 77 issues from May 30, 1868, to November 20, 1869. Issue no. 11, dated August 8, 1868, was seized for "offenses against the person of the Emperor; offenses against the person of the Empress; contempt of the Judiciary; [...]". As a result, Rochefort was condemned and had to take refuge in Belgium. From no. 14 onwards, the newspaper was definitively banned in France and started being printed in Brussels.
- The second series consisted of 86 issues from July 4, 1874, to February 19, 1876.

== Criticism of Napoleon III's regime ==
Rochefort claimed the journal was inspired by Louis-August Rogeard and his criticisms of Napoleon III in La Rive gauche. La Lanterne attacked the weaknesses of the Second Empire and even made jokes about Napoleon's dog, Nero, as well as the emperor's family.

The regime did not accept these criticisms and initiated numerous legal proceedings. After a prohibition on public sale, Rochefort was taken to court and sentenced to fines and imprisonment. He had to flee to Brussels to escape the police.

In Belgium, he met with Victor Hugo, another enemy of "Napoléon-le-Petit", (Note: "Napoleon The Small", in reference to Victor Hugo's political phamphlet) who took him in for several months. Rochefort continued to edit his newspaper, and renewed his criticism of Napoleon III's regime.

In France, La Lanterne was sold clandestinely (printed in Brussels and smuggled in busts of Napoleon to escape censorship) and still found readers. Protected by his exile, Rochefort took an even more caustic approach to attacking the Empire. A sworn enemy of the Bonapartists, he ran in the 1869 legislative elections in Paris but was defeated by Jules Favre, whom the Bonapartists supported. In November, he was elected to the seat vacated by León Gambetta.

Rochefort stopped publishing La Lanterne in 1876 in order to create a new newspaper, La Marseillaise.

== Popularity ==
La Lanterne adopted a light and sometimes irrational style similar to boulevard theater, abundant use of puns and jokes. This style ensured its success in Paris. According to some testimonials, notably that of journalist Francisque Sarcey during his tour with the Comédie-Française, the newspaper could be found in Lyon and Dijon in equal measure. Additionally, Rochefort's prosecution reinforced La Lanterne's sulfurous character.

The newspaper's growing popularity soon sparked jealousy and irritation. Blanqui wrote:

"The lantern is a terrible festive fire against Bon (Bonaparte), which delights the bourgeois. They pay dearly for its satires; they chase after them. Smuggling thrives. But look at our writings! The bourgeois would rather denounce them."

According to some historians, the shape and lightness of La Lantern inspired late 19th-century newspapers such as Le Gaulois, La Cloche, and Le Lorgnon.

== Bibliography ==
- Chisholm, Hugh, ed. (1911). "Rochefort, Henri" . Encyclopædia Britannica (11th ed.). Cambridge University Press.
- Dauphiné, Joël (2004). Henri Rochefort: déportation et évasion d'un polémiste. Paris, France: L'Harmattan. ISBN 978-2-7475-6967-5.
- Rochefort, Henri; Lidsky, Paul (2005) [1896]. Les aventures de ma vie. Temps retrouvé. Paris, France: Mercure de France. ISBN 978-2-7152-2455-1.
- Williams, Roger L. (1966). Henri Rochefort, Prince of the Gutter Press. Scribner.
