= L'Echo =

French-language Belgian business newspaper

- Type: Daily newspaper
- Format: Berliner format
- Owner: Mediafin
- Founded: 22 May 1881; 144 years ago
- Language: French
- Headquarters: Avenue du Port 86C, Box 309, 1000 City of Brussels, Brussels-Capital Region, Belgium
- Circulation: 18,736 (second half of 2012)
- Sister newspapers: De Tijd
- Website: www.lecho.be

L'Echo (French pronunciation: [leko]) is a Belgian daily newspaper that mainly focuses on business and economics. It is published by Mediafin and mainly distributed in Wallonia and Brussels. It is the French-language counterpart of the Flemish daily De Tijd, which is its sister paper.

== History and profile ==
L'Echo originated as L'Écho de la bourse de Bruxelles (lit. 'The Brussels Stock Exchange Echo') which was first published on 22 May 1881. It was renamed L'Écho de la Bourse (lit. 'The Stock Exchange Echo') in 1889 and retained the name until 1990 when the paper adopted its current title. It is owned by Mediafin which is also the owner of the Flemish business daily De Tijd. Both papers offer financial and economic news.

L'Echo is headquartered in Brussels. In March 2012 it began to be published in Berliner format.

== Circulation ==
L'Echo sold 260,000 copies in 1990. The paper had a circulation of 28,765 copies and a market share of 4.5% in 2002. The paper had a 18,736 copies in the second half of 2012.
