= De Morgen =

Flemish newspaper published in Brussels

DeMorgen.

- De Morgen of 7 May 2025
- Type: Daily newspaper
- Format: Berliner
- Owner: DPG Media
- Editor: An Goovaerts
- Founded: 1978; 48 years ago
- Headquarters: Antwerp
- Circulation: 53,860
- Website: www.demorgen.be

Logo in 2005

De Morgen (Dutch pronunciation: [də ˈmɔrɣə(n)]; The Morning) is a Flemish newspaper with a circulation of 53,860. The paper is published in Antwerp, Belgium.

== History and profile ==
De Morgen originates from a merger in 1978 of two socialist newspapers Vooruit (newspaper) (meaning "Onwards" in English) and Volksgazet (meaning "People's Newspaper" in English). The Vooruit was founded in Ghent by Edward Anseele and appeared the first time on 31 August 1884, just before the foundation of the Belgian Labour Party (Dutch: Belgische Werklieden Partij) in 1885.

De Morgen was modelled on French daily Libération. The paper is published by De Persgroep which also publishes Het Laatste Nieuws.

De Morgen presents itself as an independent and progressive newspaper and a more dynamic alternative to its two competitors in the Flemish market, De Standaard and De Tijd. On the other hand, the paper is described as a leftist and socialistic publication. According to the former editor-in-chief Yves Desmet, the Flemish press was "de-pillarized" under the influence of De Morgen.

The paper has won several prizes for its revolutionary lay-out. It has applied advanced printing technology to be able to print with greener, water-based ink and higher quality paper.

=== Obama controversy ===
The controversial cartoon. The caption reads: "Vladimir Putin is the president of Russia. He sent us this attachment at our request, and chose to send pictures instead of text 'because he doesn't have a lot of time'."

On 22 March 2014, De Morgen ran a satirical news section titled The Obama Herald about then-US president Barack Obama's upcoming visit to Belgium and the recent annexation of Crimea by Russia. The "Opinion" section included two images supposedly sent by Vladimir Putin: an image macro of Barack which reads, "First Black president of the USA starts selling weed"; and an image of Barack and Michelle Obama with chimpanzee-like faces. This sparked accusations of anti-Black racism, including from Nigerian-born Belgian novelist Chika Unigwe, who tweeted, "so photo of the Obama's [sic] as chimps in De Morgen of today is the paper's attempt at satire. I forgot to laugh." On March 27, 'De Morgen issued an apology for the publication, explaining, "When you consider the fragment apart from its context, which is a properly worked out satirical section, then you don’t see the joke but just a picture evoking sheer racism. We wrongly assumed that racism is no longer accepted, and that in this way it could be the subject of a joke."

== Circulation ==
The 2002 circulation of De Morgen was 68,359 copies. Its market share in the same year was 5.4%. The circulation of De Morgen was 57,248 copies in 2008. During the first quarter of 2009, the paper had a circulation of 76,439 copies. Its total circulation was 58,496 copies in 2009. It was 55,973 copies in 2010 and 55,936 copies in 2011.
