= DPG Media =

Belgian media group active in Belgium and the Netherlands

DPG Media Group NV

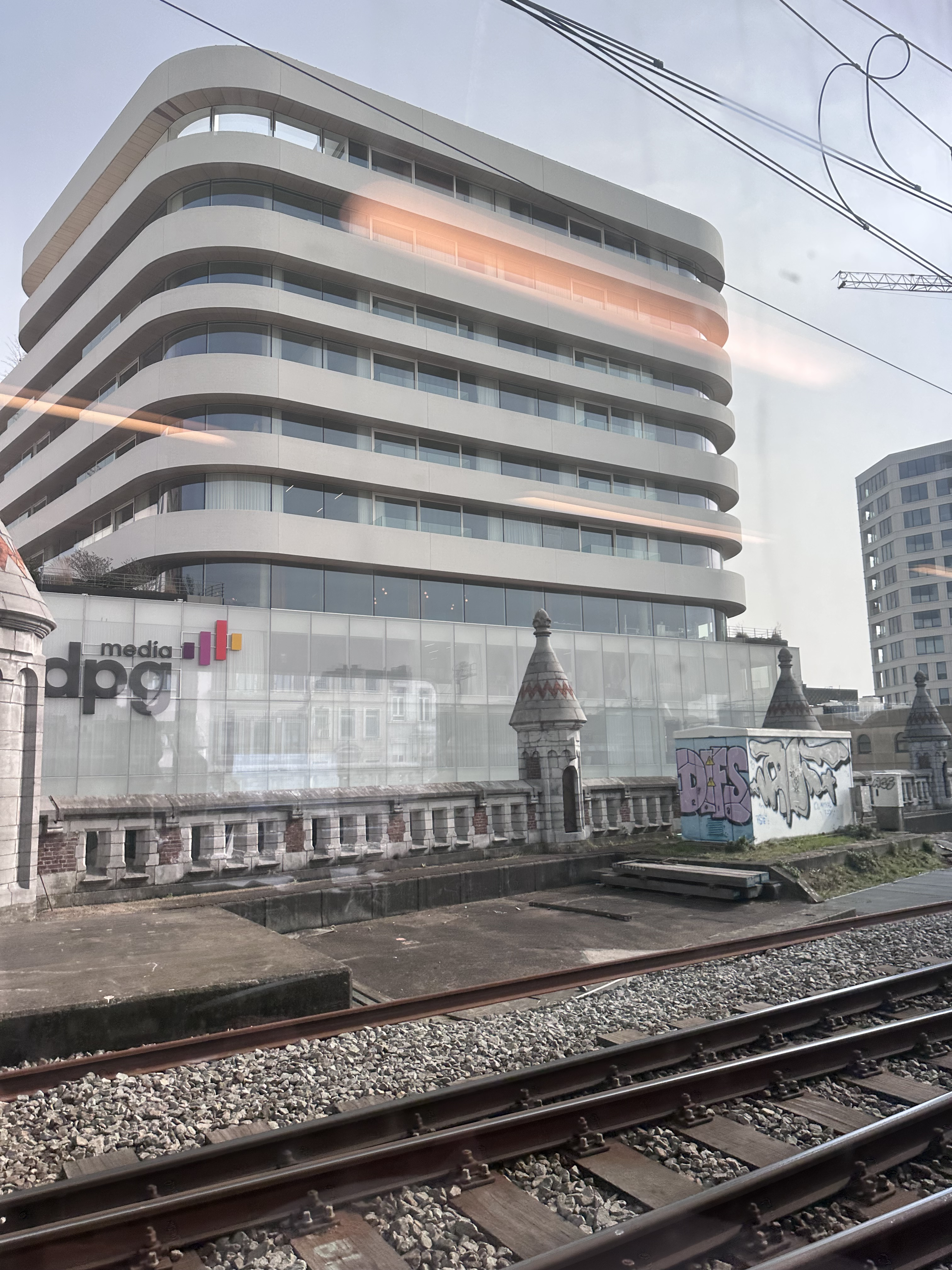
- DPG Media's editorial office in Antwerp
- Trade name: DPG Media
- Formerly: Vlaamse Televisie Maatschappij (VTM) (1987–1999); Vlaamse Media Maatschappij (VMMa) (1999–2014); Medialaan (2014–2019)
- Type: Privately held company
- Industry: Media; News; Entertainment
- Founded: 1987 (De Persgroep); 2019 (DPG Media)
- Founder: Christian Van Thillo
- Headquarters: Antwerp, Belgium
- Areas served: Belgium; Netherlands; Denmark (until 2024)
- Key people: Erik Roddenhof (CEO); Christian Van Thillo (Executive chairman); Piet Vroman (CFO)
- Products: Print media; TV; Radio; Broadcasting; Online services; Video on demand
- Revenue: €2.054 billion (2025)
- Net income: €178 million (2020)
- Number of employees: 6,271 (2025)
- Website: dpgmediagroup.com

DPG Media Group (Note: DPG is short for its former name, De Persgroep. In Dutch, it is also called DPG Media Group.) is a Belgian media group active in Belgium and the Netherlands. It was founded as a merger of Medialaan and De Persgroep in 2019. From 2014 to 2024, they also owned holdings in Denmark. The exact ownership structure is not clear; it is believed that the group is mainly owned by the Belgian Van Thillo family, led by Christian Van Thillo, who is the executive chairman as of 2025 and the former CEO.

== Divisions ==
The DPG Media Group operates through two national subsidiaries:

- DPG Media België was founded on 1 January 2019, when Medialaan and de Persgroep Publishing merged into one organization. The company is active in television, radio, newspapers, magazines, and online services.
- DPG Media Nederland is the largest media organization in the Netherlands. After the merger between Medialaan and de Persgroep Publishing into DPG Media Belgium, the Dutch branch Persgroep Nederland was renamed DPG Media Nederland. In 2020, the company took over the Dutch activities of Sanoma Media Netherlands. The company is also active in radio, newspapers, magazines, and online services in the Netherlands.

== History ==
=== 1987–2002: Formation in Flanders ===
The prior logo of Medialaan, when it was still known as VTM.

In 1987 the Van Thillo family, already the publishers of magazines Joepie (1973) and Dag Allemaal (1984), obtained 66 percent of shares in the Flemish publishing company Hoste NV, publisher of newspaper Het Laatste Nieuws and magazine Blik. In 1990 the rest of the shares were acquired and the company's name was changed to De Persgroep. The company had already bought Flemish newspaper publisher De Nieuwe Morgen in 1989, giving it ownership over a second newspaper, De Morgen.

Also in 1987, De Persgroep was one of nine publishers involved in the foundation of the Vlaamse Televisie Maatschappij (VTM), the first and main commercial TV broadcaster in Flanders. The channel was launched on 1 February 1989. Each publisher originally owned 11.1% of the new company's shares. On 30 January 1995, Vlaamse Televisie Maatschappij launched a second TV channel, Ka2 (now VTM 2).

In 1992, De Persgroep launched Goed Gevoel, the group's first magazine. In 1995, the first issue of showbiz magazine TV Familie appeared. In November 2001 at 6 am, Qmusic went live with the Deckers & Ornelis Ochtendshow.

In 2002, De Persgroep expanded to book publishing and DVD distribution.

=== 2003–2013: Expansion into the Netherlands ===
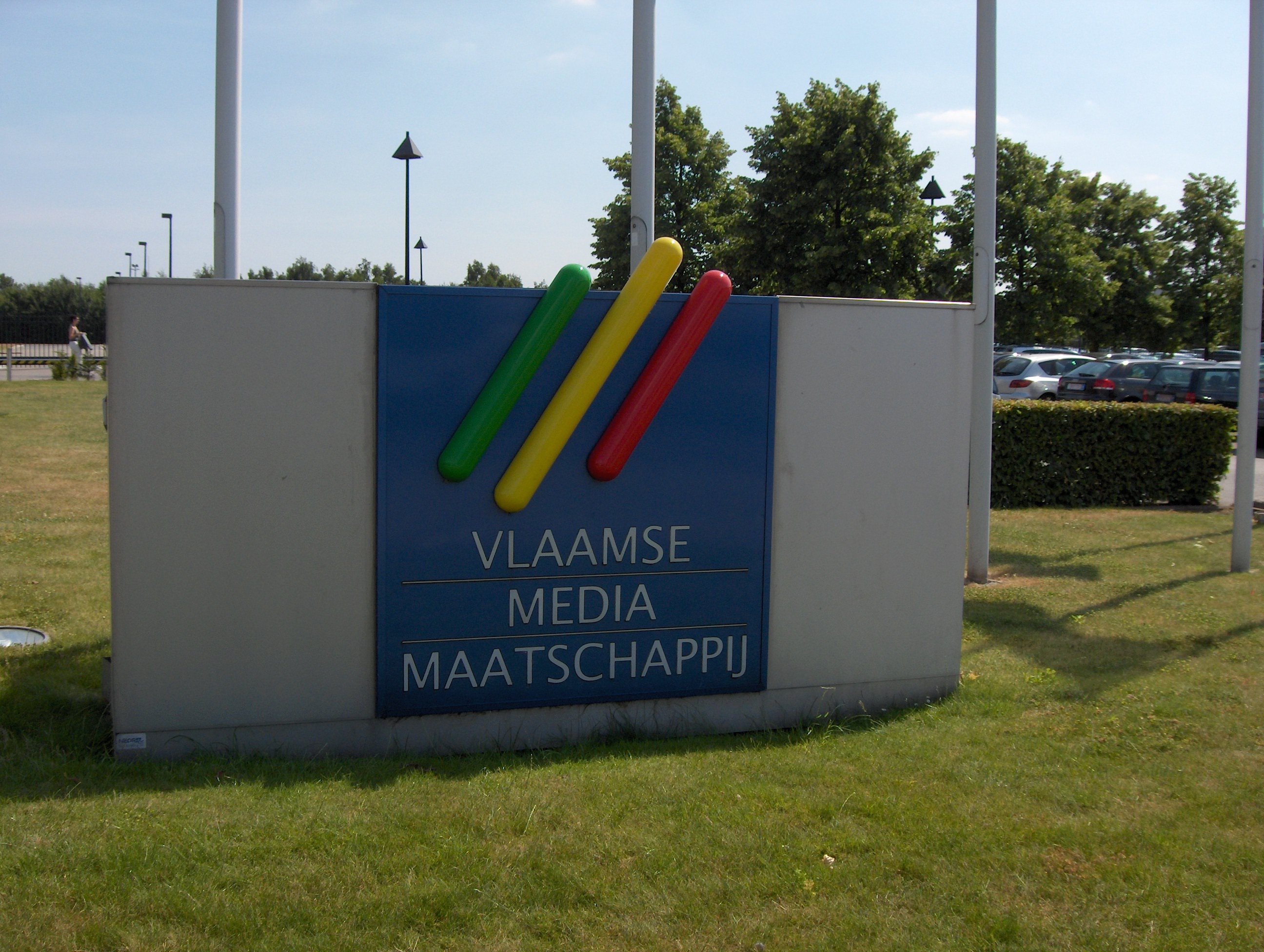
The logo and sign of VMMa. prior to its rebranding

In 2003, De Persgroep acquired ailing Amsterdam city newspaper Het Parool, entering the Dutch market. In August 2003, HLN.be went online. In December 2004, the website, with 700,000 unique monthly visitors, was the most visited news site in Belgium.

In 2005, De Persgroep acquired the Dutch radio station Radio Noordzee and renamed it Qmusic Nederland. That same year, De Persgroep joined forces with the Walloon media group Groupe Rossel to acquire Editco, publisher of the French-language business paper L'Echo, distributed in Brussels and Wallonia. In 2005, the two groups also bought Uitgeverij De Tijd, publisher of De Tijd, the Flemish counterpart to L'Echo. Editco and Uitgeverij De Tijd merged and became Mediafin, with De Persgroep and Groupe Rossel each holding 50% in the venture.

In 2007, radio station 4FM was acquired by VVMa. In 2009 the station was renamed Joe. That same year, VMMa started telco brand JIM Mobile, together with KPN.

In 1994, the Perscombinatie (publisher of the De Volkskrant, Trouw and Het Parool) acquired a majority stake in Meulenhoff & Co. Perscombinatie Meulenhoff was rebranded PCM Publishing and publication of newspapers and books became its core activities. In late 1995, PCM acquired the Nederlandse Dagbladunie (publisher of TVNZ and Algemeen Dagblad) and became publisher of four of the five national newspapers, four regional titles and door-to-door papers in the Randstad. PCM sold its stake in Het Parool to De Persgroep in 2002, making it De Persgroep's first foreign investment.

PCM was acquired by British-based investment group Apax Partners in 2004. In 2005, Algemeen Dagblad and four regional newspapers were housed in AD New Media BV with PCM holding a 63% interest in the venture.

In July 2009, De Persgroep acquired a majority stake in PCM Publishing and renamed the subsidiary De Persgroep Nederland. A number of transactions were connected to the main acquisition. In July 2009, De Persgroep Nederland sold the house-to-house papers (PCM Local Media) to Wegener. Shortly after, De Persgroep Nederland acquired the 37% stake that Wegener held in AD New Media BV. The acquisition also included the printing house of Wegener in The Hague. Next, De Persgroep Nederland sold NRC Handelsblad and nrc.next for 70 million euros to Egeria in 2009 and the PCM Algemene Boeken book-publishing unit (business object Meulenhoff & Co) to WPG Uitgevers and Lannoo. As a result, De Persgroep Nederland remained the publisher of four national newspapers, Algemeen Dagblad, De Volkskrant, Trouw and Het Parool.

In 2012, De Persgroep Nederland acquired VNU Media, a Dutch publisher of magazines and online tools for professionals, especially in the recruiting and employment sectors. In 2013, De Persgroep acquired the car website Autotrack from Wegener, consolidating its digital portfolio in the Netherlands.

=== 2014–2018: Acquisitions of Mecom and Medialaan ===
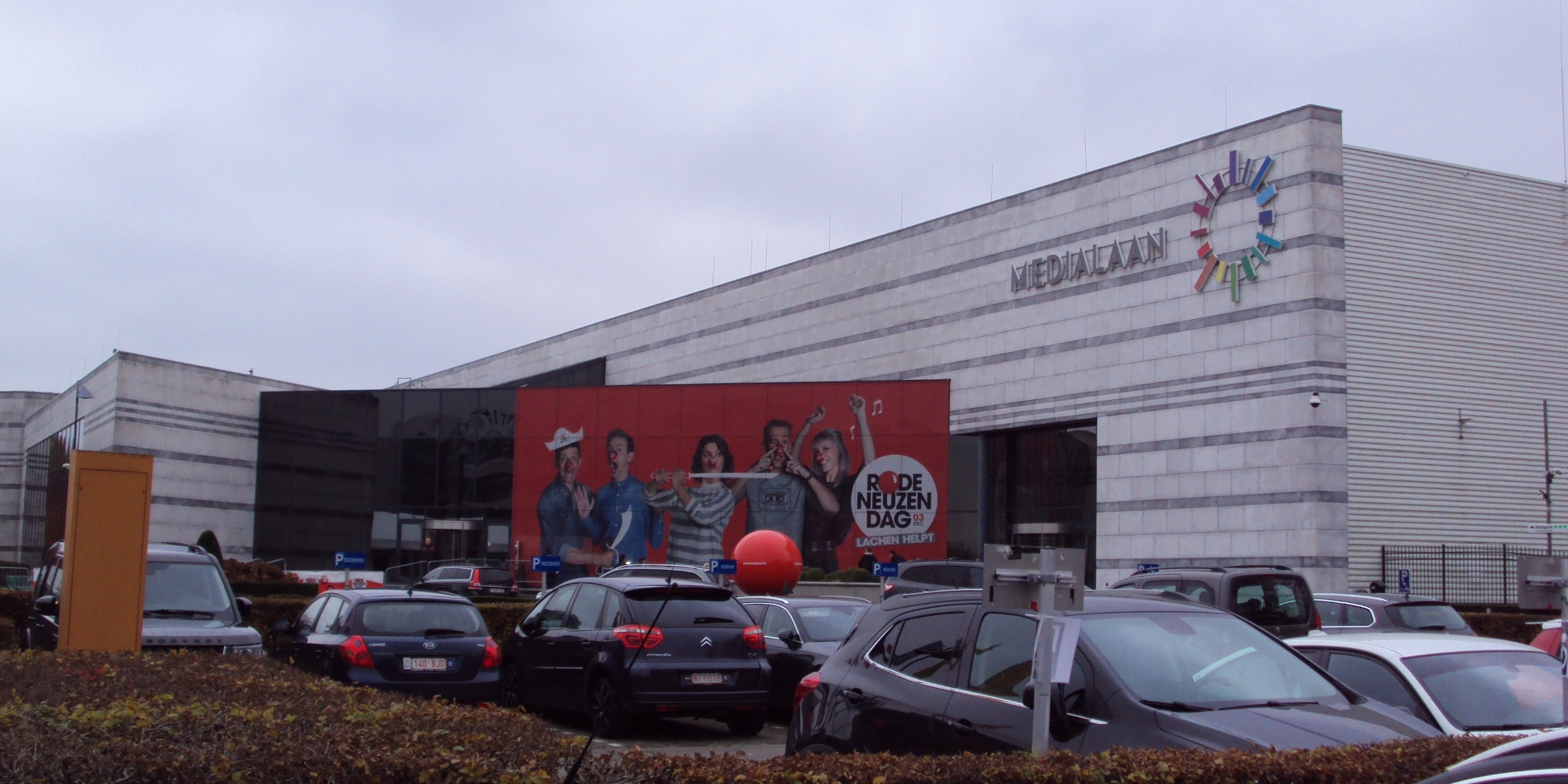
Medialaan

In February 2014, what started out as Vlaamse Televisie Maatschappij (VTM) in 1987, then becoming Vlaamse Media Maatschappij (VMMa) in 1999, was renamed Medialaan (meaning 'media avenue'), reflecting the street in Vilvoorde on which it is located.

De Persgroep acquired Mecom Group in 2014, thereby adding Wegener, publisher of regional newspapers in the Netherlands, to its assets. The acquisition also included Berlingske Media a Danish media group particularly known for the Berlingske newspaper, one of the world's oldest, and the popular tabloid paper B.T.. De Persgroep sold Midtjyske Media, Berlingske Media's regional newspaper division, to Jutland Funen Media in 2015.

In 2015, Sanoma's Belgian division sold four magazines (Humo, Story, TeVe Blad and Vitaya magazine) to De Persgroep. Vitaya magazine was merged with another Persgroep title, Goed Gevoel, in February 2017. De Persgroep further expanded its magazine holdings when it bought Cascade, publisher of the magazines Primo, Eos, Bahamontes, Motoren & Toerisme and For Girls Only, from Dutch media company Audax Groep in 2018. On 30 April 2019 the company closed two separate deals, whereby three of the former Cascade titles - Bahamontes, Motoren & Toerisme and For Girls Only - were acquired by a new company, De Deeluitgeverij, and a fourth, popular science title Eos, was sold to the new Eos Wetenschap vzw.

In 2016, De Persgroep carried out several acquisitions in the Netherlands, expanding its portfolio with website Hardware.info, B2B marketing company Synpact, and online video platform MyChannels. In Belgium De Persgroep acquired financial comparison website Spaargids.be. With virtual network operator Mobile Vikings, an additional telecom brand was brought in. In 2017, De Persgroep acquired Reclamefolder.nl in the Netherlands. In 2018, De Persgroep bought magazine Primo and price comparison websites Independer and Mijnenergie.

In 2017, De Persgroep bought Roularta's ownership stake in VTM parent company Medialaan and increased its interest to 100%. Roularta received a 50 percent stake in Mediafin and 217.5 million euros in cash. This turned De Persgroep into the sole owner of Medialaan. The company merged Medialaan with its newspaper and magazine publishing holdings in Belgium. To represent this change, the company changed the name of its Belgian holdings to Medialaan-De Persgroep Publishing.

=== 2019–: Name change and acquisition of RTL Nederland ===
On 23 May 2019, Medialaan-De Persgroep Publishing changed its name to DPG Media.

On the job and automotive markets, DPG Media joined forces with Mediahuis. The online platforms AutoTrack.nl (DPG Media) and Gaspedaal.nl (Mediahuis) became the joint venture Automotive MediaVentions. On the job market, Vacature.com (DPG Media) and Jobat.be (Mediahuis) merged into Jobat, the new reference on the Belgian recruiting market. In December 2019, DPG Media announced the acquisition of all Dutch assets of Finnish media and publishing company Sanoma, gaining ownership of the magazines Libelle and vtwonen and news platform NU.nl. Sanoma's Belgian unit, that was already stripped down after selling many of its brands and businesses to both DPG Media and Roularta in previous years and consequently having become a publisher of home and deco magazines exclusively, was also included in the deal. The transaction was approved on 10 April 2020 by the Netherlands Authority for Consumers and Markets and became effective on 20 April.

On 1 March 2020, Christian Van Thillo stepped down as CEO of the company, a role he had taken up for 30 years. His successor was Erik Roddenhof, who previously managed the company's Belgian and Dutch businesses. Roddenhof will continue to run the Dutch division, on top of his duties as the new CEO of the entire group. Kris Vervaet and Anders Krab-Johansen remained CEOs of respectively the Belgian and Danish divisions. Van Thillo became the company's board's executive chairman and in that capacity spearheads the group's strategy, acquisition policy, and the development of the group's media brands.

On 1 June 2021, the sale of Mobile Vikings to Proximus was approved by the Belgian Competition Authority.

In December 2022, it was announced that the RTL Group was considering selling its Dutch TV station RTL Nederland. After merger plans failed in 2023, it was officially announced in December that RTL Group was selling RTL Nederland for 1.1 billion euros to DPG Media. The acquisition was scheduled to be completed by mid-2024. The takeover was approved by the Netherlands Authority for Consumers and Markets in June 2025.

In December 2024, DPG Media announced that it had sold its shares of the Danish media group Berlingske Media to Norwegian media group Amedia.

== Brands ==
DPG Media carries brands in television, radio, news, magazines (including tabloids), online services, and video on demand. In Flanders and the Netherlands, they are in Dutch, and in Wallonia, they are in French.

DPG Media Belgium
Television		Radio		News		Magazines	Online services	Video on demand	
Dutch	French	Dutch	French	Dutch	French	Dutch	Online services	Dutch	French
VTM	RTL TVI (50%) (Note: This station is a joint venture with Groupe Rossel.)	Q-Music	Bel RTL (50%)	7SUR7	RTL Info (50%)	Dag Allemaal	Jobat (Note: Formerly "Vacature.com"; vacature.com redirects to jobat.be.)	Streamz (Note: Streamz is a joint venture with Telenet.)	RTL Play (50%)
VTM 2	RTL Club (50%)	JOE	Mint (50%)	Het Laatste Nieuws (daily)		DM Magazine	Livios	VTM GO	
VTM 3	RTL Plug (50%)	Willy	Radio Contact (50%)	De Morgen (daily)		Goed Gevoel	Mijnenergie.be		
VTM 4	RTL District (50%)			VTM Nieuws		Humo	Spaargids.be		
VTM Gold						Nina	Tweakers		
VTM Series						Primo			
						Story			
						TeVe Blad			
						TV-Familie			

=== DPG Media Netherlands ===
==== Television ====
- RTL Nederland :
  - RTL 4
  - RTL 5
  - RTL 7
  - RTL 8
  - RTL Crime
  - RTL Lounge
  - RTL Telekids
  - RTL Z
  - Videoland (on-demand service)
  - Buienradar (weather and climate app)

==== Radio ====
- Joe
- Qmusic

==== News ====
===== National =====
- Algemeen Dagblad
- De Ondernemer
- de Volkskrant
- Nu.nl
- Sportnieuws.nl
- Trouw
- Topics

===== Regional =====
- Brabants Dagblad
- BN De Stem
- De Gelderlander
- De Stentor
- De Twentsche Courant Tubantia
- Het Parool
- Eindhovens Dagblad
- Provinciale Zeeuwse Courant

==== Magazines ====
- Ariadne at Home
- AutoWeek
- AutoWeek GTO
- Bladcadeau
- Donald Duck
- Eigen Huis & Interieur
- Fashionchick
- Fashionchick Girls
- Flair (magazine
- Flow
- Kek MAMA
- Libelle
- Margriet
- Nouveau
- Ouders van nu
- Stijlvol Wonen
- Story
- Tina
- Totaal TV
- Veronica Superguide
- VIVA
- VIVA mama
- vtverbouwen
- vtwonen
- Wonen Landelijke Stijl
- Zo Zit Dat

==== Online services ====
- Tweakers
