= 1886 in Belgium =

- Decades: 1860s; 1870s; 1880s; 1890s; 1900s
- See also: Other events of 1886; List of years in Belgium

The following lists events that happened during 1886 in the Kingdom of Belgium.

== Incumbents ==
- Monarch: Leopold II
- Prime Minister: Auguste Marie François Beernaert

== Events ==
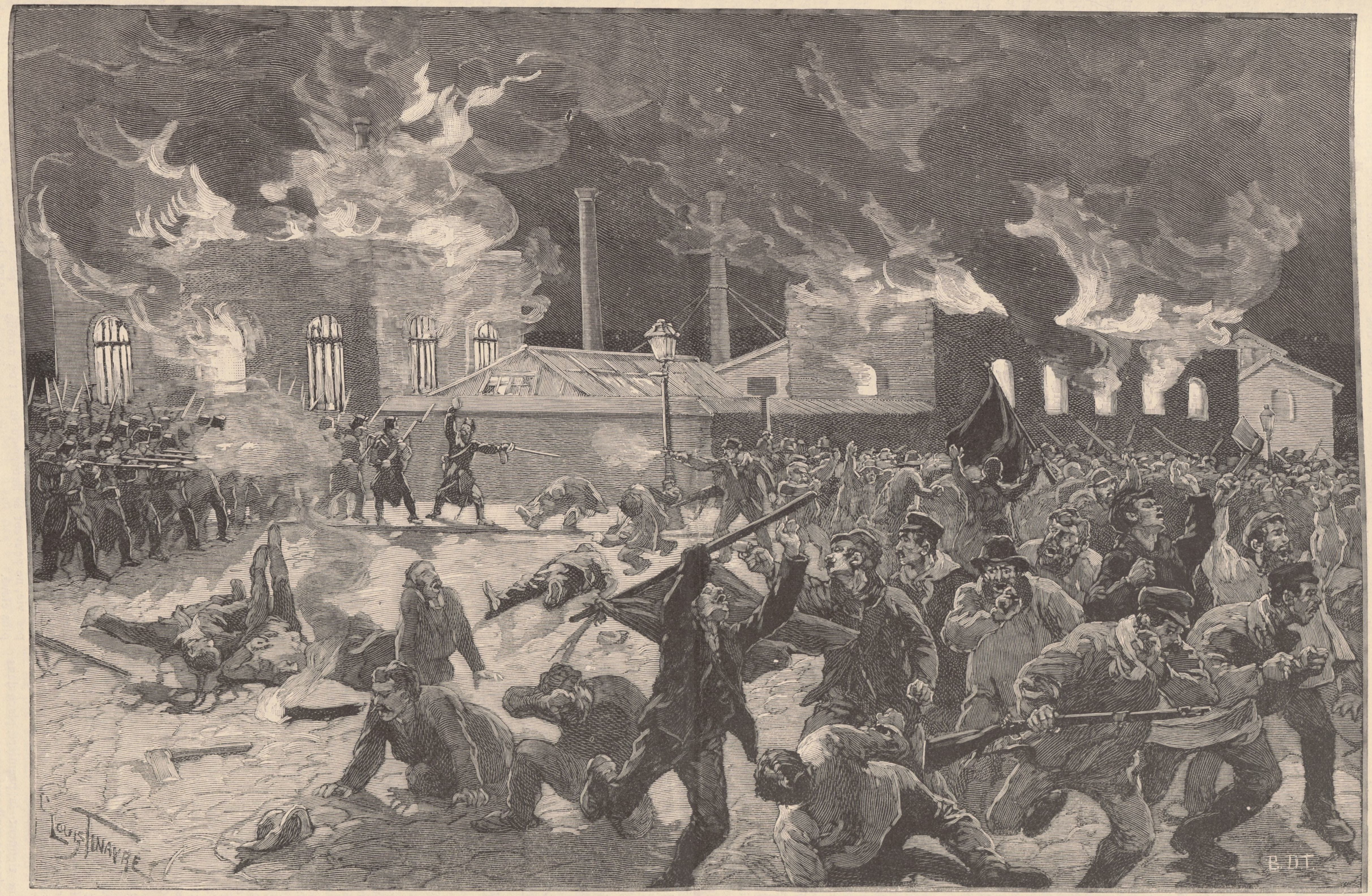
Soldiers fire on strikers in Roux, 10 April 1886

- 18–29 March – Series of strikes and disturbances in industrial areas of Wallonia
- 22 March – Law on copyright passed.
- 4 April – Henri-Charles Lambrecht consecrated coadjutor bishop of Ghent
- 10 April – Soldiers fire on strikers in Roux
- 23 May – Provincial elections
- 8 June – Partial legislative elections of 1886
- 8 July – Royal decree establishing Royal Flemish Academy of Language and Literature

== Publications ==
Periodicals

- Het Belfort begins publication
- La Wallonie begins publication
- Bulletin du Musée royal d'histoire naturelle de Belgique, vol. 4.

Books

- Adolphe Burdo, Les Belges dans l'Afrique Centrale: De Zanzibar au lac Tanganika (P. Maes)
- Clémentine Louant, Le bonheur d'Andrée
- Jean Stecher, Histoire de la Littérature néerlandaise en Belgique (Brussels, 1886)
- Émile Verhaeren, Les Moines

== Art and architecture ==
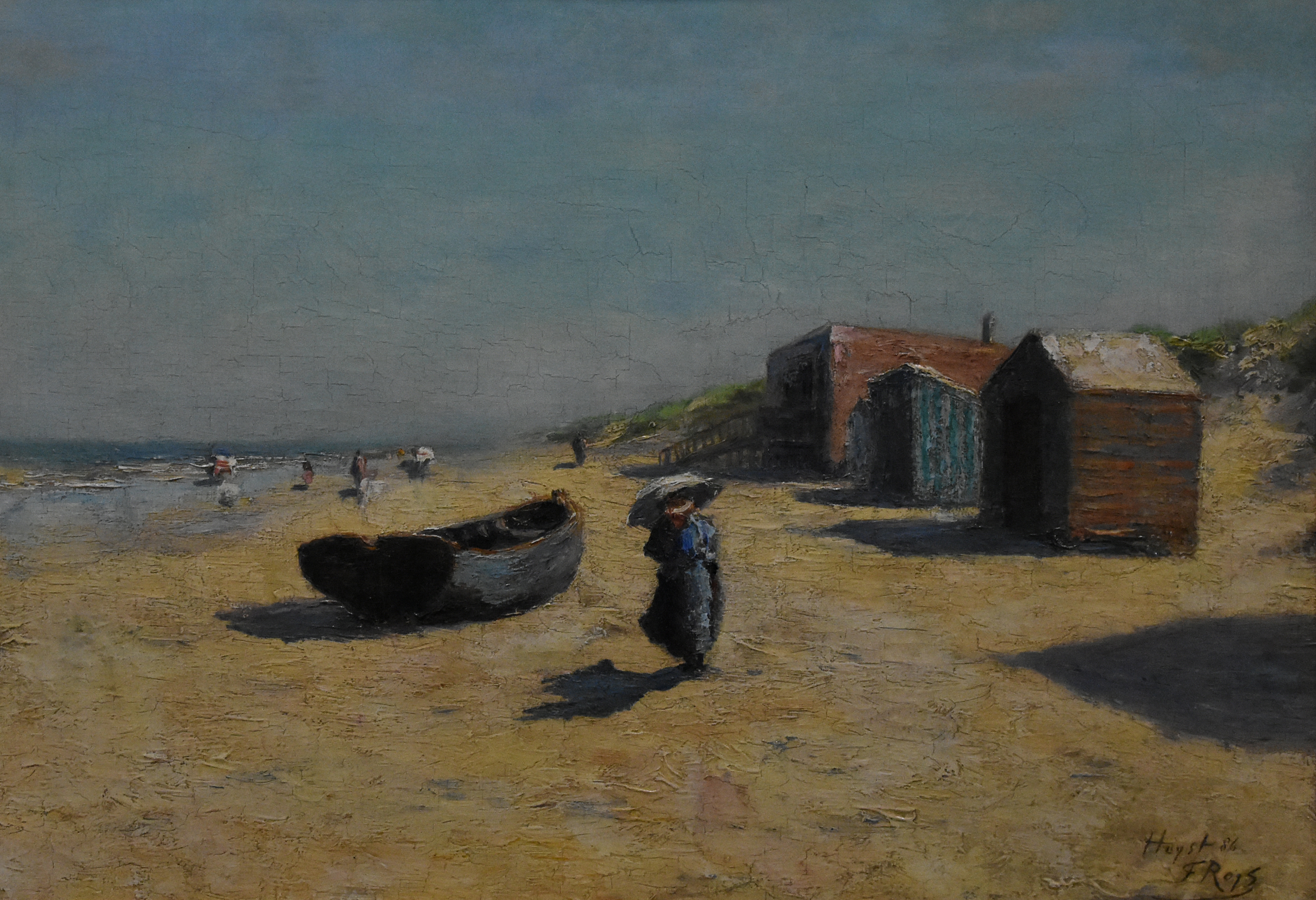
Félicien Rops, The Beach in Heist

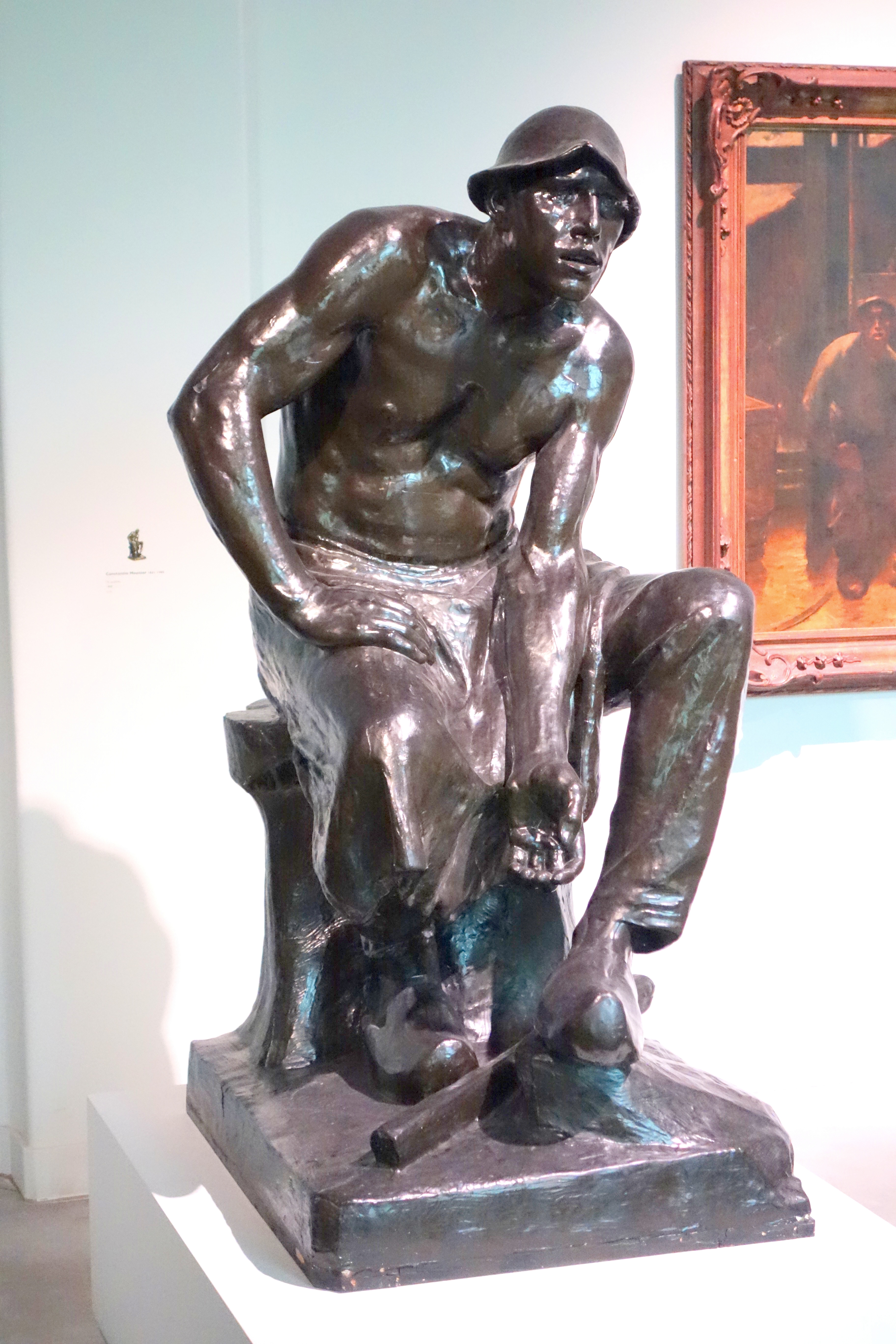
Constantin Meunier, The Puddeler (1886)

Paintings

- Félicien Rops, The Beach in Heist
- Théo van Rysselberghe, Portrait of Marguerite van Mons

Sculptures

- Constantin Meunier, The Puddeler

== Births ==
- 4 February – René-Gabriel van den Hout, priest and editor (died 1969)
- 12 February – Maurice Bladel, writer (died 1968)
- 18 May – Marcel Wolfers, sculptor (died 1976)

== Deaths ==
- 9 February – Edmond Speelman (born 1819), Jesuit
- 30 March – Jean-Joseph Charlier (born 1794), revolutionary
- 5 July – Charles Baugniet (born 1814), artist
- 11 July – Jules Malou (born 1810), politician
- 6 August – Jean-François Abeloos (born 1819), sculptor
