= 1890 in Belgium =

- Decades: 1870s; 1880s; 1890s; 1900s; 1910s
- See also: Other events of 1890; List of years in Belgium

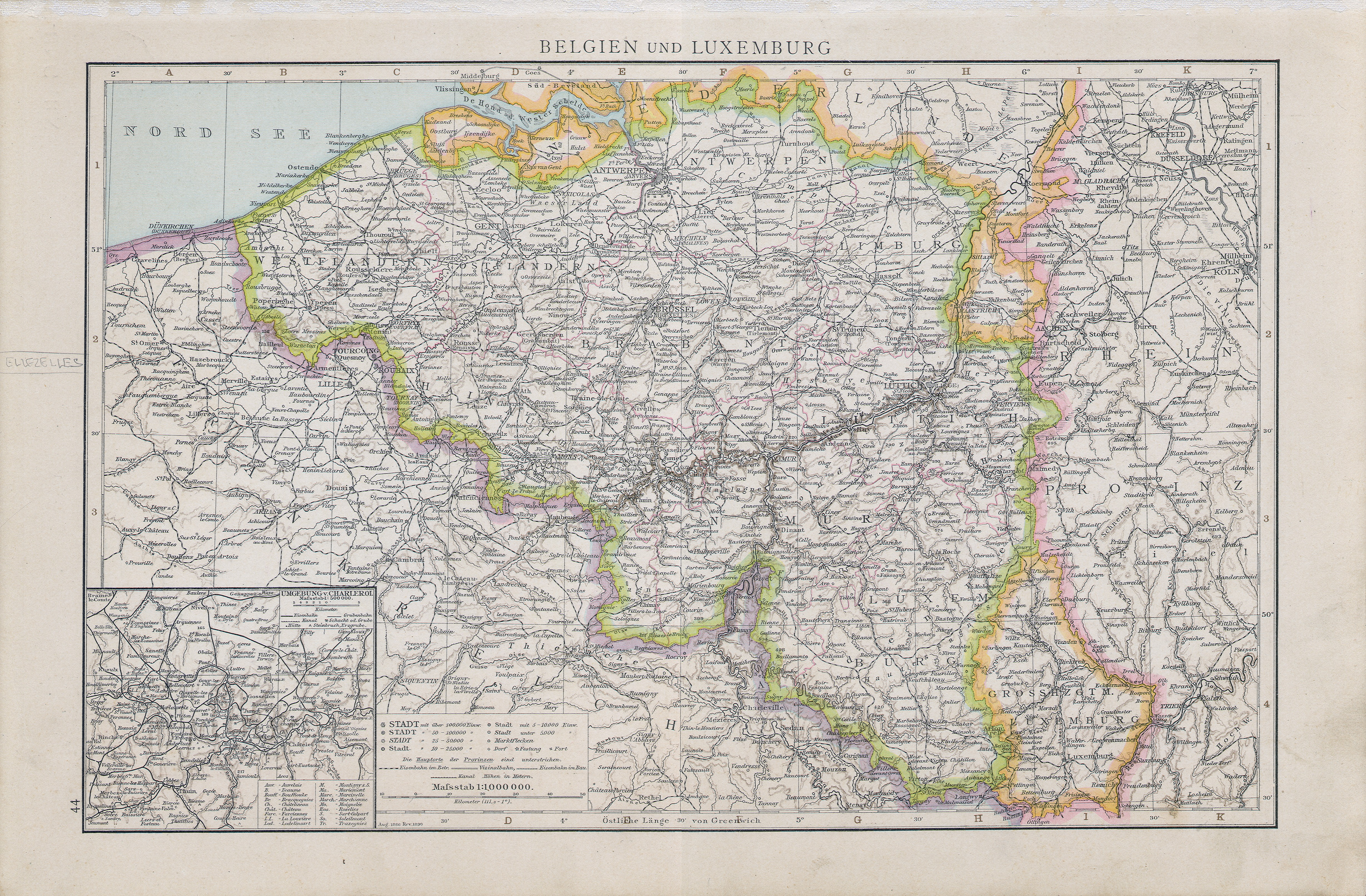
Map of Belgium and Luxembourg from Andrees Allgemeiner Handatlas (1890)

Events in the year 1890 in Belgium.

== Incumbents ==
- Monarch - Leopold II
- Prime Minister: Auguste Marie François Beernaert

== Events ==
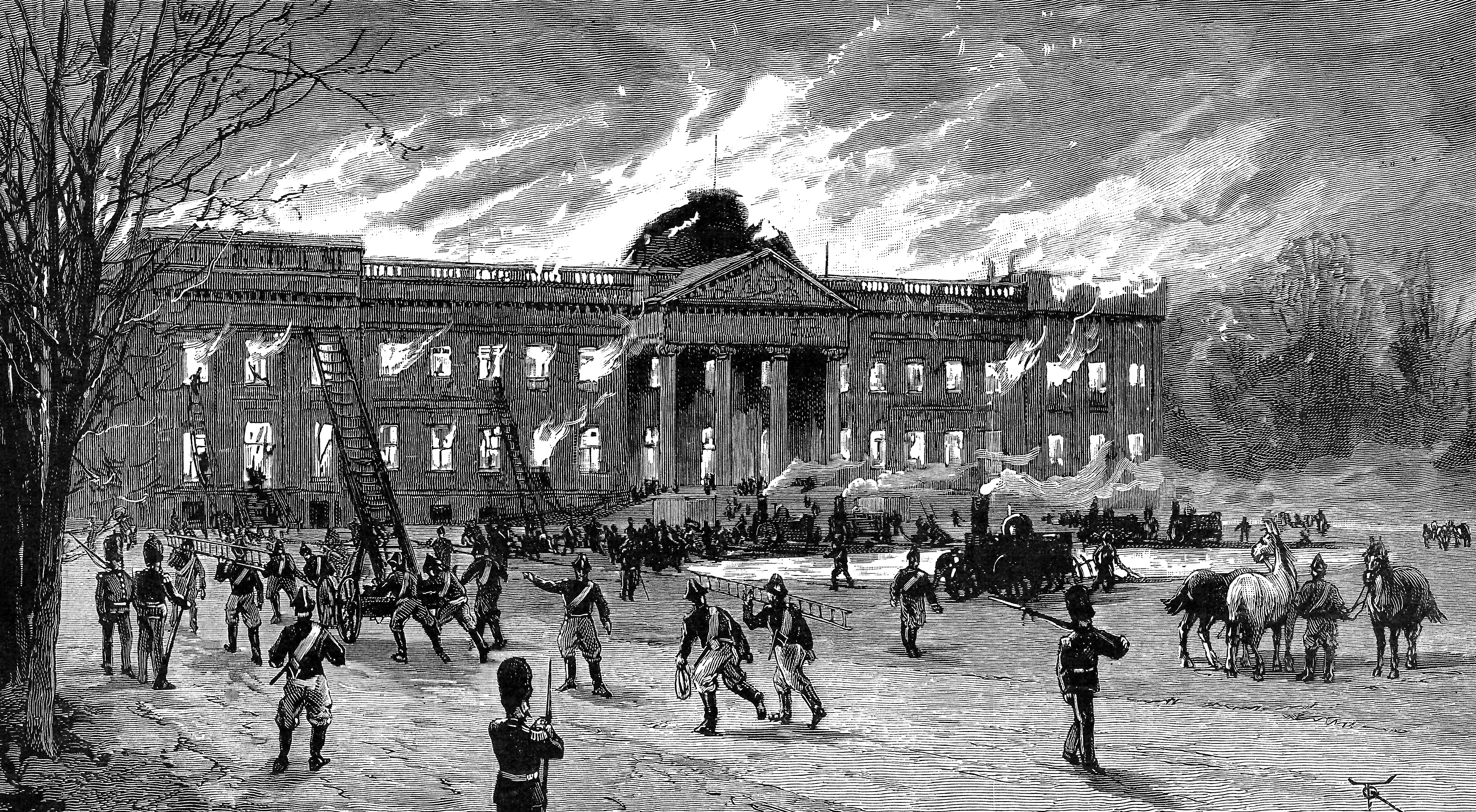
T. Griffiths, The Burning of Laeken Castle, Brussels, The Residence of King Leopold, published in The Graphic, 11 January 1890

- 1 January – Fire at Palace of Laeken
- 25 May – Provincial elections
- 27 May – Belgian National Day is made a legal holiday
- 10 June – Belgian general election, 1890
- 2 July – Brussels Conference Act of 1890 (anti-slavery convention)
- 21 July – first observance of 21 July as Belgian National Day; king lays the foundation stone of the Arcade du Cinquantenaire in Brussels.
- 16 to 21 August – Seventh International Eucharistic Congress held in Antwerp, with an estimated 150,000 participants.
- establishment of Sint-Leocollege in Bruges

== Art and architecture ==
Louis Titz, Halle, St Martin's Basilica, 1890

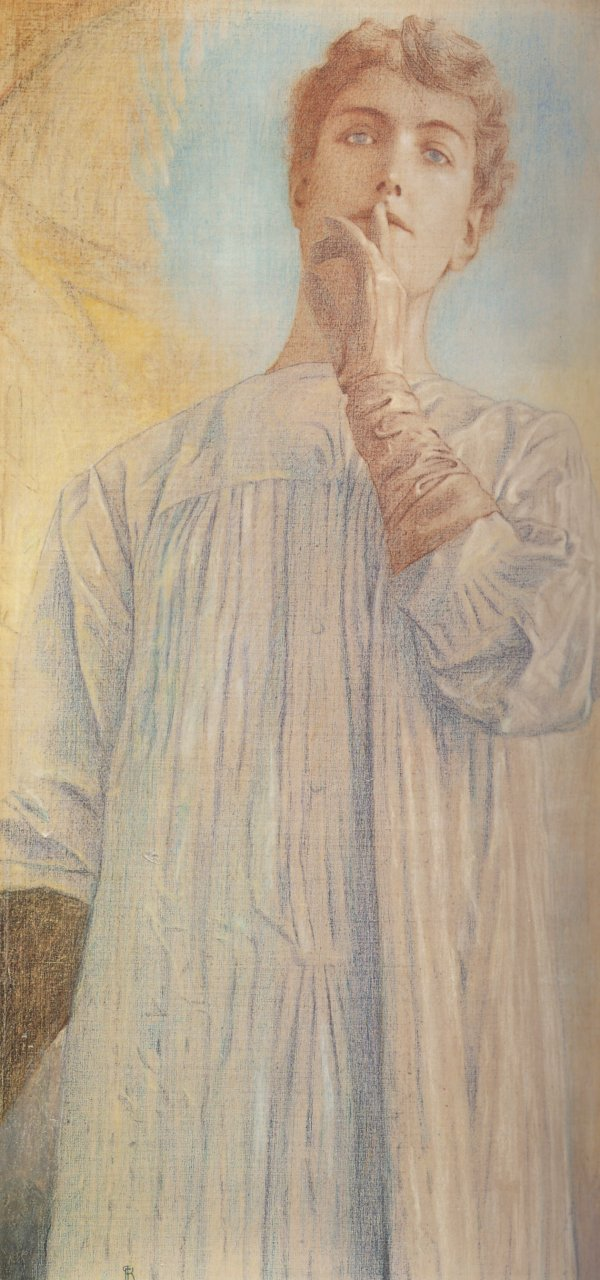
Fernand Khnopff, Silence, c. 1890 (Royal Museums of Fine Arts of Belgium)

Paintings

- Fernand Khnopff, Silence (c. 1890)
- Louis Titz, Halle, St Martin's Basilica

== Publications ==
- Sylvain Balau, Soixante-dix ans d'histoire contemporaine de Belgique (1815-1884), 3rd edition, with a preface by Charles Woeste (Liège, L. Grandmont-Donders, and Ghent, A. Siffer).
- Dom Bernard, Geschiedenis der Benedictijner Abdij van Affligem (Ghent, A. Siffer)
- Prosper de Haulleville, Les nonciatures apostoliques en Belgique depuis 1830
- Paul Fredericq, The Study of History in Holland and Belgium, translated by Henrietta Leonard (Baltimore, Johns Hopkins University Press)
- Iwan Gilkin, La Damnation de l'artiste (Brussels, Edmond Deman)
- Alexis Marie Gochet, Les Congolais: leurs moeurs et usages. Histoire, géographie et ethnographie de l'état indépendant du Congo (Liège, H. Dessain)
- Philippe Kervyn de Volkaersbeke, La Lutte de l'Irlande (Lille, Société de Saint-Augustin)

== Births ==
- 1 January – Alphonse Six, footballer (died 1914)
- 5 March – Ann Codee, actress (died 1961)
- 25 June – Camille Tihon, archivist (died 1972)
- 10 October – Jan Vanderheyden, film-maker (died 1961)
- 13 November – Oscar Blansaer, Olympic athlete (died 1962)

== Deaths ==
- 2 March – Eudore Pirmez (born 1830), politician
- 22 March – Désiré de Haerne (born 1804), priest
- 11 May – Eugène Albert (born 1816), clarinet maker
- 23 May – Louis Artan (born 1837), artist
- 5 July – Pierre Van Humbeeck (born 1829), politician
- 3 September – Willem Linnig the Younger (born 1842), artist
- 22 September – Joanna Courtmans (born 1811), writer
- 23 October – Charles Verlat (born 1824), painter
- 16 November – Jean Auguste Ulric Scheler (born 1819), philologist
- 19 December – César De Paepe (born 1841), syndicalist
- 21 December – Eugène Anspach (born 1833), governor of the national bank
