= 1888 in Belgium =

- Decades: 1860s; 1870s; 1880s; 1890s; 1900s
- See also: Other events of 1888; List of years in Belgium

The following lists events that happened during 1888 in the Kingdom of Belgium.

== Incumbents ==
- Monarch: Leopold II
- Prime Minister: Auguste Marie François Beernaert

== Events ==
- Belgian State Railways Type 12 taken into service.

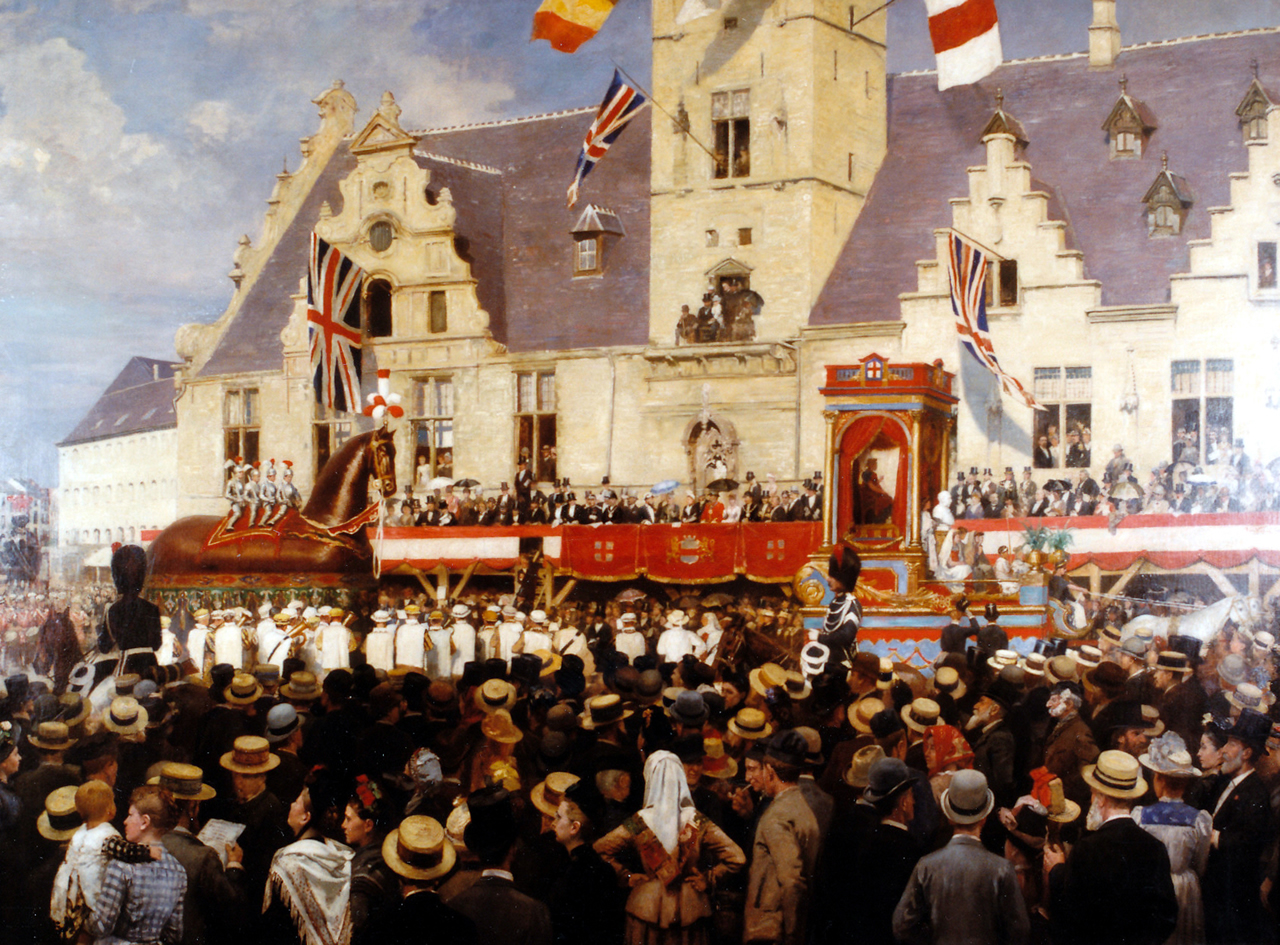
Jan Verhas, Sir Polydore de Keyser's visit to Dendermonde (1891)

- May to October – International Congress of Science and Industry held in the Jubelpark in Brussels
- 27 May – Provincial elections
- 12 June – Partial legislative elections of 1888
- August – Preaching of Charles Lavigerie in Brussels Minster inspires the founding of the Belgian Anti-Slavery Society
- 26-27 August – Polydore de Keyser, Lord Mayor of London, visits Dendermonde

== Publications ==
Periodicals

- Het Laatste Nieuws begins publication

Studies

- Theodore Low De Vinne, Christopher Plantin, and the Plantin-Moretus Museum at Antwerp (Grolier Club, New York)

Literature

- Clémentine Louant, Pauvre Germaine!
- J.-H. Rosny, Les Xipéhuz
- Émile Verhaeren, Les Soirs and Les Débâcles

== Art and architecture ==
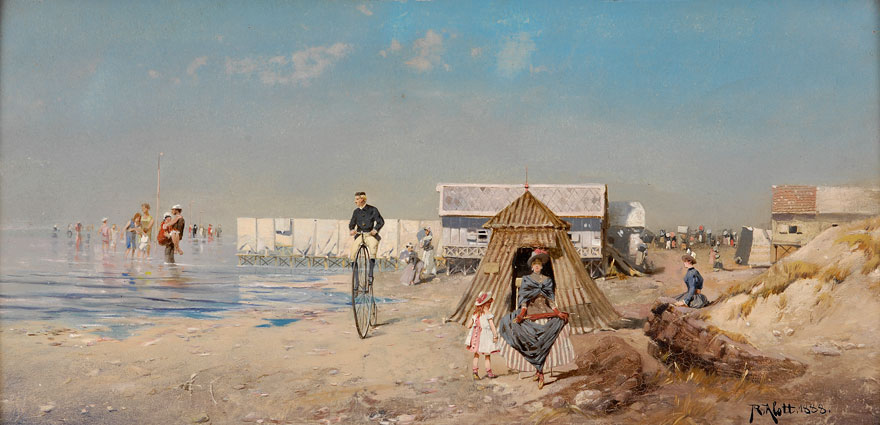
Robert Alott, Am Strand von Ostende (1888)

Paintings

- Robert Alott, Am Strand von Ostende
- Théo van Rysselberghe, Portrait of Alice Sethe

Opera

- Patrie! performed at Ghent (25 January) and Antwerp (6 March)

== Births ==
- 2 February – Valerius Coucke, biblical scholar (died 1951)
- 19 February – Hector Tiberghien, cyclist (died 1951)
- 29 February – Fanny Heldy, opera singer (died 1973)
- 4 March – Charles Leirens, photographer and musician (died 1963)
- 19 March – Léon Scieur, coureur cycliste (died 1969)
- 23 May – Dieudonné Saive, small arms designer (died 1970)
- 14 July – Odile Defraye, cyclist (died 1965)
- 11 August – Paul Loicq, hockey administrator (died 1953)
- 16 October – Émile Masson, cyclist (died 1973)
- 2 December – Omer Verschoore, cyclist (died 1932)

== Deaths ==
- 8 January – Josephus Laurentius Dyckmans (born 1811), painter
- 6 February – Gaston Errembault de Dudzeele (born 1819), diplomat
- 17 July – Henricus Franciscus Bracq (born 1804), bishop of Ghent
- 20 July – Henri de Braekeleer (born 1840), painter
- 15 August – Alexandre Jamar (born 1821), businessman
- 8 October – Jules d'Anethan (born 1803), politician
