= 1885 in Belgium =

- Decades: 1860s; 1870s; 1880s; 1890s; 1900s
- See also: Other events of 1885; List of years in Belgium

The following lists events that happened during 1885 in the Kingdom of Belgium.

== Incumbents ==
- Monarch: Leopold II
- Prime Minister: Auguste Marie François Beernaert

== Events ==
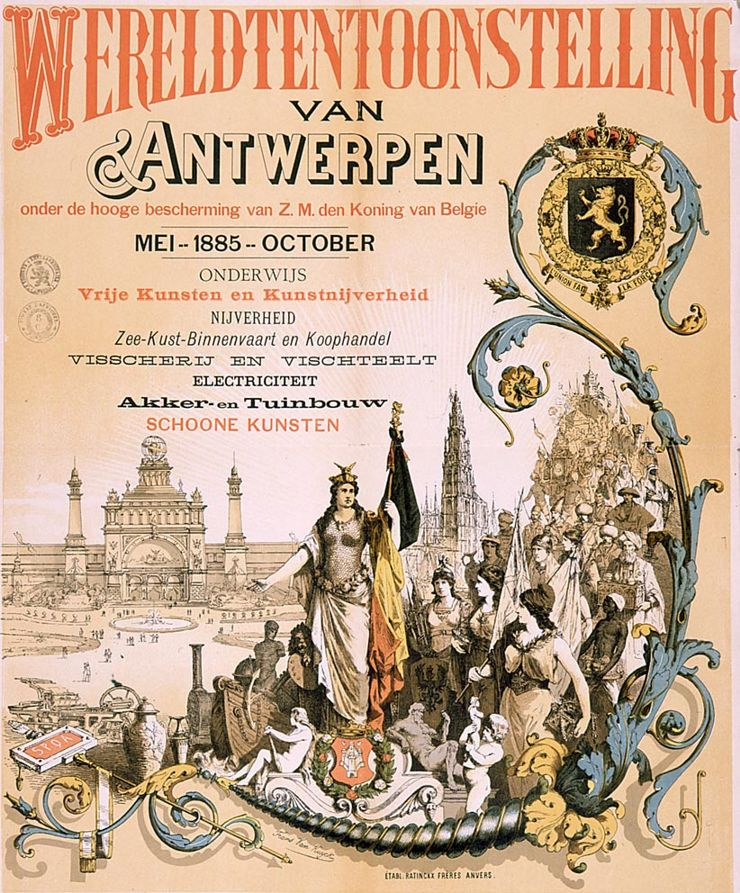
Poster advertising the 1885 World Exhibition in Antwerp

- Belgian State Railways Type 6 steam locomotive taken into use.
- 26 February – Conclusion of the Berlin Conference granting sovereignty over the Congo Basin to Leopold II.
- 6 April – Inaugural meeting of the Belgian Labour Party held in Brussels.
- 30 April – Leopold II receives parliamentary authorisation to assume sovereignty over the Congo Basin
- 2 May – World Exhibition in Antwerp opens (to 2 November)
- 1 August – Congo Free State established

== Publications ==
Periodicals

- Bulletin du Musée royal d'histoire naturelle de Belgique, vol. 3.

Books

- Karl Baedeker, Belgium and Holland: Handbook for Travellers
- Joseph Van den Gheyn, Essais de mythologie et de philologie comparée

== Art and architecture ==
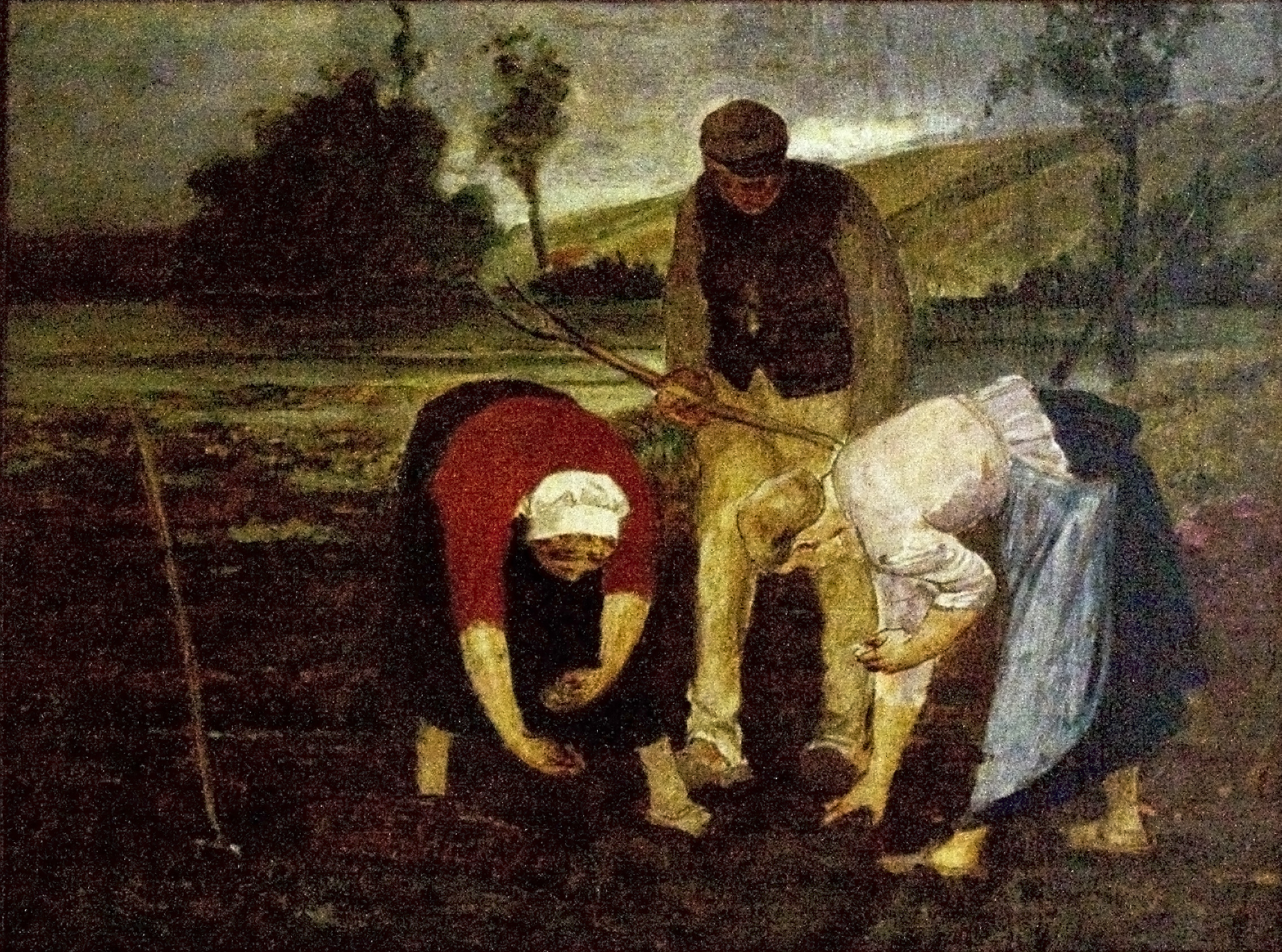
Constantin Meunier, The Potato Diggers (1885)

Paintings

- Fernand Khnopff, Portrait of Jeanne Kéfer
- Constantin Meunier, The Potato Diggers
- Théo van Rysselberghe, Portrait of Octave Maus

Sculptures

- Thomas Vinçotte, The Horse Tamer (Brussels)

== Births ==
- 29 January – Raoul Van Overstraeten, general (died 1977)
- 29 June – Camille Clifford, actress (died 1971)
- 17 November – Henri De Man, politician (died 1953)

== Deaths ==
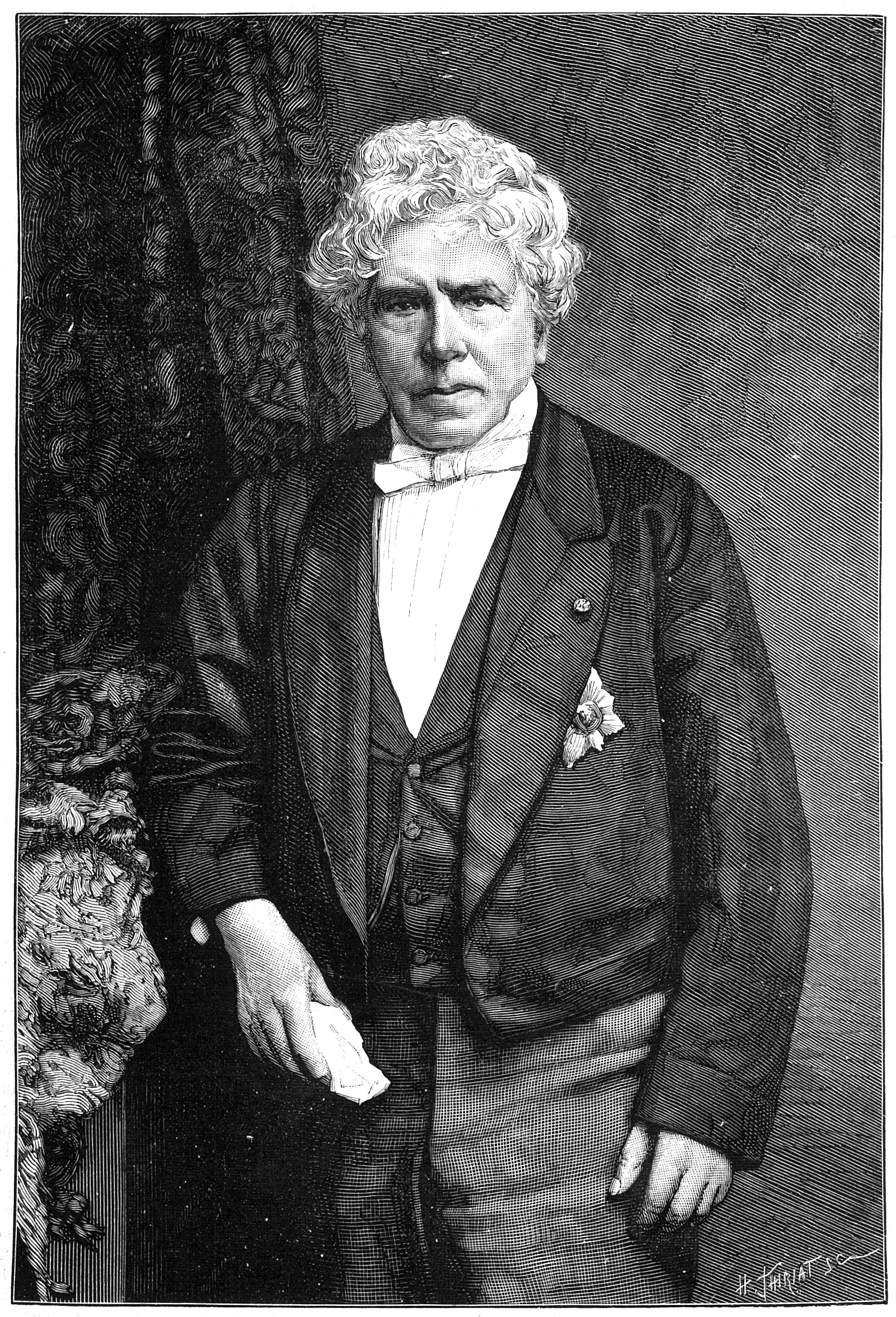
Charles Rogier (1800–1885)

- 27 May – Charles Rogier (born 1800), politician
- 20 August – Édouard Agneessens (born 1842), painter
- 9 October – Joseph Geefs (born 1808), sculptor
