= 1887 in Belgium =

- Decades: 1860s; 1870s; 1880s; 1890s; 1900s
- See also: Other events of 1887; List of years in Belgium

The following lists events that happened during 1887 in the Kingdom of Belgium.

== Incumbents ==
- Monarch: Leopold II
- Prime Minister: Auguste Marie François Beernaert

== Events ==
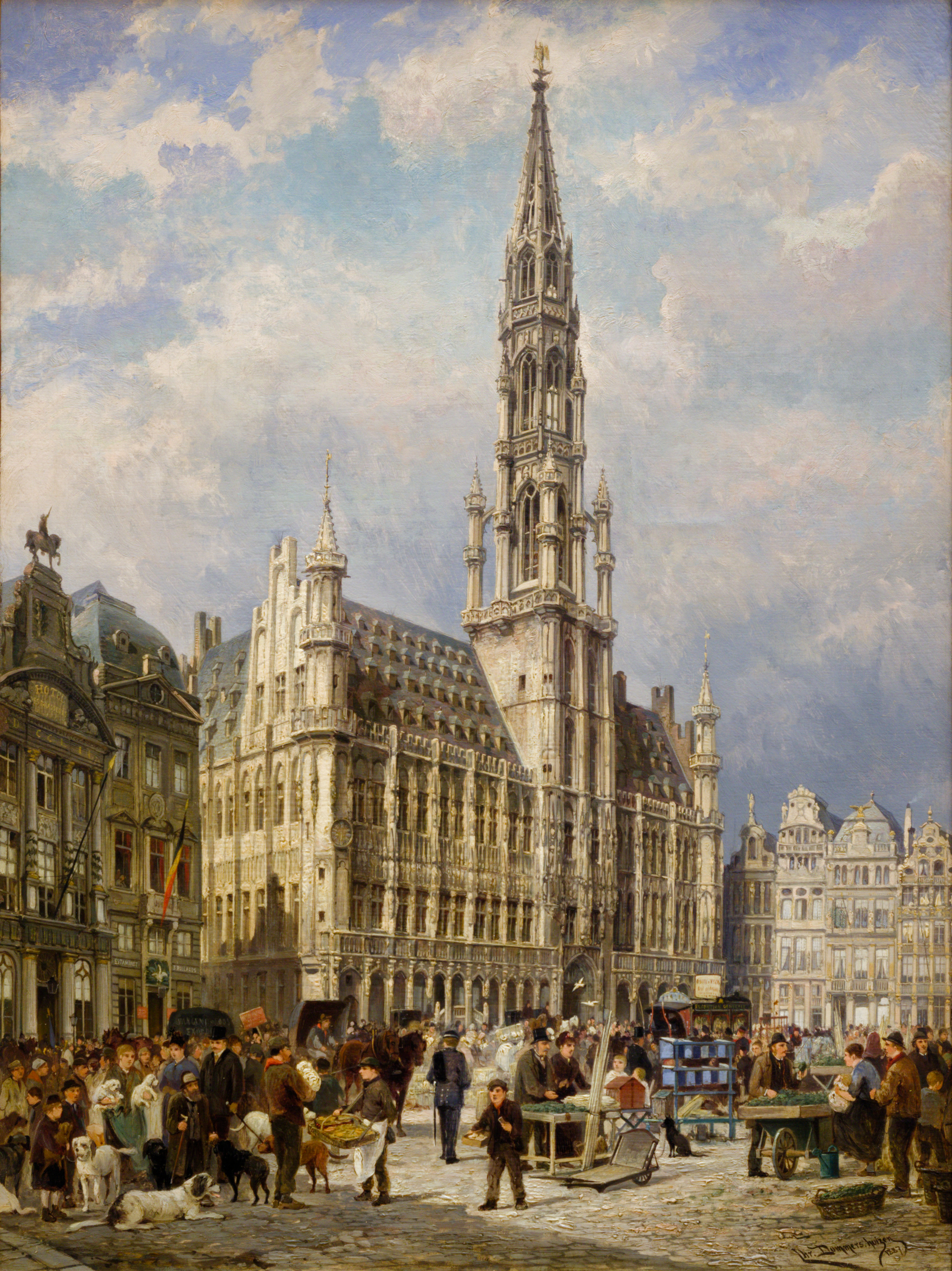
Christiaan Dommershuijzen, Brussels' Grand Place in 1887

- Progressive Party founded, led by Paul Janson
- 24 February – The first international telephone line in Europe is opened to the public between Brussels and Paris
- 24 August – Soldiers fire upon Ostend trawlermen protesting the favouritism shown to British trawlermen
- 21 December – Achel Abbey buys the buildings of Rochefort Abbey to restore the monastery there

== Publications ==
Periodicals

- Le Soir begins publication

Books

- Alphonse Dubois, Faune des vertébrés de la Belgique: Série des oiseaux (Brussels, A la librairie C. Muquardt, Th. Falk Sr), vol. 1

== Art and architecture ==
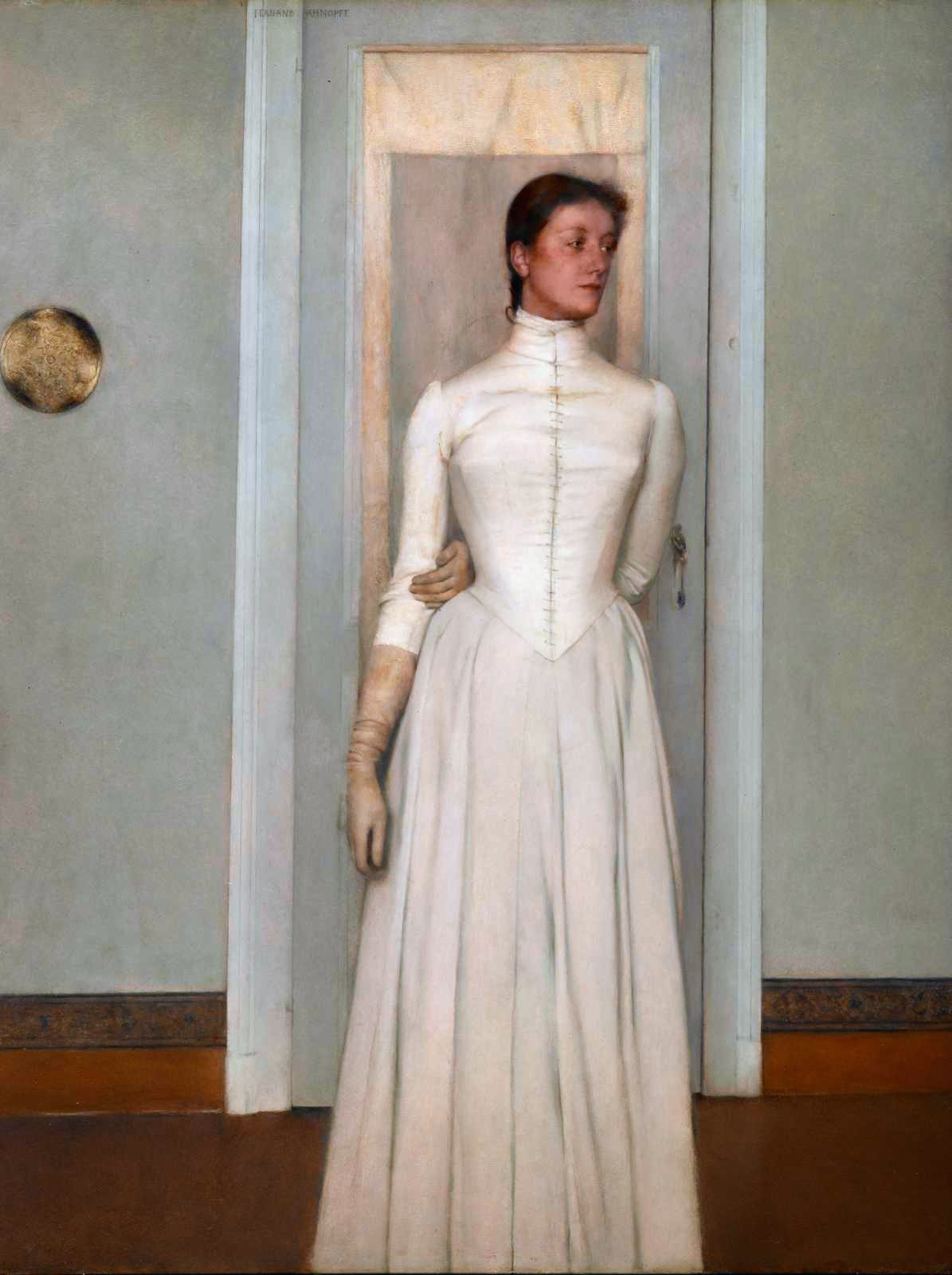
Fernand Khnopff, Portrait of Marguerite Khnopff (1887)

- Brussels City Museum inaugurated

Paintings

- James Ensor, Carnaval sur la plage
- Fernand Khnopff, Portrait of Marguerite Khnopff

Buildings

- Franz Seulen, Schaerbeek railway station
- Work starts on Provinciaal Hof, Bruges

== Births ==
- 6 January – Berthe Bovy, actress (died 1977)
- 14 January – Félix Rousseau, historian (died 1981)
- 28 March – Pierre Nothomb, writer (died 1966)
- 23 April – Georges-Marie de Jonghe d'Ardoye, papal diplomat (died 1961)
- 8 June – Émile Dupont, Olympic marksman (died 1959)
- 25 October – Léon Darrien, gymnast (died 1973)
- 27 October – Philippe Le Hardy de Beaulieu, fencer (died 1942)
- 23 November – Paul de Maleingreau, composer (died 1956)

== Deaths ==
- 11 February – François Laurent (born 1810), historian
- 4 March – Peter Jan Beckx (born 1795), Jesuit
- 16 July – Laurent-Guillaume de Koninck (born 1809), palaeontologist
- 17 July – Nicaise De Keyser (born 1813), painter
- 20 November – Louis Gallait (born 1810), painter
- 29 December – Jules Van Praet (born 1806), diplomat
