= International Federation for Human Rights =

Non-governmental federation of organisations

- Founded: 1922; 104 years ago
- Type: Federation of Human Rights Organisations; Non-profit; NGO
- Headquarters: Paris, France
- Region served: Worldwide
- Services: Protect human rights defenders, ensure effective human rights, and justice for all, globalisation with due respect for human rights.
- Fields: Human rights
- Members: 196 organisations (in more than 115 countries)
- President: Alexis Deswaef
- Key people: Daniel Jacoby; René Cassin; Joseph Paul-Boncour; Victor Basch; Khurram Parvez
- Website: fidh.org

The International Federation for Human Rights (French: Fédération internationale pour les droits humains, FIDH) is a non-governmental federation for human rights organizations. Founded in 1922, FIDH is the third oldest international human rights organization worldwide after Anti-Slavery International and Save the Children. As of 2025, the organization is made up of a federation of 196 organizations from 115 countries.

FIDH is nonpartisan, nonsectarian, and non-governmental. Its core mandate is to promote respect for all the rights set out in the Universal Declaration of Human Rights, International Covenant on Civil and Political Rights, and the International Covenant on Economic, Social and Cultural Rights.

Between 2009 and 2012, FIDH conducted 280 international missions focused on fact-finding, trial observation, solidarity, and advocacy in nearly 80 countries.

FIDH coordinates and supports collaborations with intergovernmental organizations.

== Overview ==
FIDH was established in 1922, when it united ten national organizations. In 1927, the FIDH proposed an international declaration of human rights for adoption by states, followed by a bill of human rights in the 1930s. Neither initiative was adopted before the outbreak of the Second World War. In the 1940s and 1950s, FIDH was among the first organizations to conduct international trial observations. As of 2020, the organization comprises a federation of 192 organizations from 112 countries, including Israel and Palestine. FIDH coordinates and supports the activities of its member organizations at the local, regional and international levels. FIDH is not linked to any party or religion and is independent. It also has a consultative status before the United Nations, UNESCO and the Council of Europe, and observer status before the African Commission on Human and Peoples' Rights, the Organisation internationale de la Francophonie and the International Labour Organization.

In addition, FIDH has "regular contact" with the European Union, Organization for Security and Cooperation in Europe (OSCE), Organization of American States, United Nations Development Programme, World Trade Organization, International Monetary Fund, World Bank, and Organisation for Economic Co-operation and Development.

FIDH's mandate "is to contribute to the respect of all the rights defined in the Universal Declaration of Human Rights." It aims to make "effective improvements in the protection of victims, the prevention of Human Rights violations and the sanction of their perpetrators." Its priorities are established by its World Congress and International Board, which counts 22 members, with the support of its International Secretariat, which has 45 staff members.

In 2025, FIDH was designated as an 'undesirable organization' in Russia.

== Funding ==
In 2000, FIDH's annual budget was US$2 million. FIDH's total income in 2012 was €5,362,268 (nearly US$7.1m), of which approximately 80% came from "grants and donations". To view current financial statements, FIDH publishes its annual financial statements on its website.

== Priorities ==
- Protecting human rights defenders:

To protect defenders of human rights, FIDH and the World Organisation Against Torture (OMCT) created the Observatory for the Protection of Human Rights Defenders. Its role is to establish the facts, alert the international community, hold discussions with national authorities and promote the strengthening of mechanisms to protect human rights defenders at national, regional and international levels.

- Promote and protect women's rights:

Discrimination and violence against women is still the norm in many states. FIDH is striving to abolish discrimination, facilitate women's access to justice, and fight impunity for perpetrators of sexual crimes committed during conflict.

- Protect migrants' rights:

States imposing stricter controls on people's movements are reducing migrant workers to mere commercial goods, leaving them vulnerable to exploitation. FIDH investigates the violation of migrants' rights from the country of origin to the country of destination, advocates for legislative and political reforms, and litigates to bring perpetrators of violations to justice.

In June 2013, FIDH provided legal assistance to two survivors of the 'left to die' boat: 72 migrants from Sub-Saharan Africa had left Libya in 2011 in a small dinghy, had run out of fuel and drifted "for two weeks along one of the busiest shipping lanes in the world". A complaint—with FIDH and three other NGOs as civil parties—was lodged against the French and Spanish military for failing to 'assist people in danger'.

- Promote effective judicial mechanisms that respect human rights:

FIDH seeks to strengthen independent judicial systems and supports transitional justice processes that respect victims’ rights. When recourse to national remedies is ineffective or impossible, FIDH helps victims to either access courts in other countries through extraterritorial jurisdiction, or to bring their cases to the International Criminal Court (ICC) or regional human rights courts. FIDH participates in strengthening these regional and international mechanisms. Achieving the universal abolition of capital punishment and securing the right to a fair trial, including in the fight against terrorism, are also important FIDH objectives.

- Strengthen respect for human rights in the context of globalisation:

FIDH documents and denounces human rights violations involving corporations and demands that economic actors be held accountable, including through litigation. FIDH aspires to see human rights positioned at the heart of investment and trade negotiations, and strives for the effective implementation of economic, social and cultural rights.

- Defend democratic principles and support victims in times of conflict:

FIDH responds to requests from member organisations in times of armed or violent political conflict and in closed countries. It conducts fact-finding missions in the field and mobilises the international community through international and regional organisations, third countries and other levers of influence.

== Activities ==
Monitoring and promoting human rights, assisting victims

These activities, including fact-finding and trial observation missions, research, advocacy and litigation, are implemented by independent human rights experts from all regions. In 1927, the FIDH proposed a "World Declaration of Human Rights", then an International Criminal Court. In 1936, FIDH adopted an additional declaration including the rights of mothers, children and the elderly, the right to work and welfare, the right to leisure and the right to education. In 1998, FIDH launched a campaign for the release of Hafez Abu Saada, who was then serving as Secretary-General of the Egyptian Organization for Human Rights. Six days after FIDH's intervention, he was released. In 2000, the Egyptian public prosecutor's office decided to resume legal proceedings against Abu Saada. Representatives of FIDH held talks with the Egyptian authorities, after which a meeting took place in Paris between Abu Saada and the head of President Hosni Mubarak's administration, and Abu Saada was able to return to the country. Between 2009 and 2012, 576 defenders of human rights were released and the judicial harassment of 116 defenders ended.

Mobilizing the international community

FIDH provides guidance and support to its member organizations and other local partners in their interactions with international and regional inter-governmental organizations (IGOs). FIDH has established delegations at the UN in Geneva and New York, at the European Union in Brussels and, since 2006, at the League of Arab States in Cairo. From 2004 to 2005, FIDH filed and supported over 500 cases before international IGOs. FIDH participates in standard-setting processes and promotes the establishment of monitoring mechanisms.

Supporting national NGOs and increasing their capacity

FIDH, together with its members and partners, implements cooperation programs at the national level, aimed at strengthening the capacity of human rights organizations. FIDH provides training and assists in creating opportunities for dialogue with authorities. From 2004 to 2005, FIDH undertook such programs in 32 countries in Africa, 16 in Latin America, 3 in Asia and 10 in the North Africa/Middle Eastern region.

Raising awareness—informing, alerting, bearing witness

FIDH draws public attention to the outcomes of its missions, its research findings and eyewitness accounts of human rights violations, by means of press releases, press conferences, open letters, mission reports, urgent appeals, petitions and the FIDH website (in English, French, Spanish, Russian, Arabic, Persian and Turkish). In 2005, internet traffic on www.fidh.org amounted to approximately 2 million pages visited, and 400 references to FIDH per day were calculated on websites based in over 100 countries.

== Structure ==
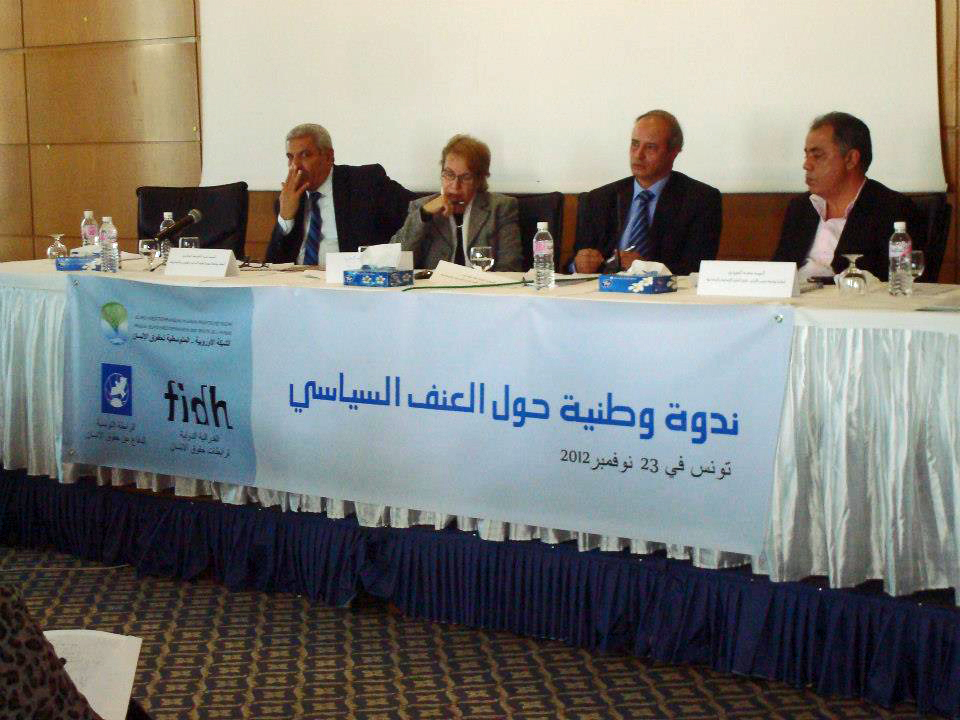
Tunisian human rights defenders seek solutions to the increase in political violence and radicalism.

FIDH has its headquarters in Paris. It relies primarily on a pool of dedicated volunteers. The organizational structure consists of elected boards and a small body of permanent staff who support the activities of the board members and the mission delegates.

Every three years, the FIDH Congress gathers together member organizations to elect the International Board, fix the priorities of the organization and decide whether to grant membership to new partners or to exclude member organizations which no longer satisfy its requirements.

On 31 October 2025, the 42nd FIDH Congress was held in Bogotá. Alexis Deswaef was elected president of the organization for a three-year term, succeeding Alice Mogwe, who became honorary president.

The FIDH International Board is composed of a President, Treasurer, 15 Vice-presidents and 5 Secretaries General, all of whom work on a voluntary basis and represent all regions of the world. Honorary Presidents have consultative status on the International Board. The International Board meets three times per year to define FIDH's political and strategic orientations and to draw up and approve the budget. The Executive Board is composed of the President, the Treasurer and the 5 Secretaries General, and is responsible for the management of FIDH on a daily basis. This body meets once per month to take decisions on current concerns and requests submitted by member organizations. The two Boards call on the expertise of other collaborators in FIDH's activities, including the permanent delegates to intergovernmental organizations and the mission delegates. The team of mission delegates gathers together several hundred individuals from all regions.

The International Secretariat is based in Paris, with delegations to the United Nations in Geneva, to the European Union in Brussels, to the International Criminal Court in The Hague, to the African Union in Nairobi and to the Asean in Bangkok. It implements decisions taken by the International and Executive Boards and ensures regular support to member organizations.
