= 1889 in Belgium =

- Decades: 1860s; 1870s; 1880s; 1890s; 1900s
- See also: Other events of 1889; List of years in Belgium

The following lists events that happened during 1889 in the Kingdom of Belgium.

== Incumbents ==
- Monarch: Leopold II
- Prime Minister: Auguste Marie François Beernaert

== Events ==
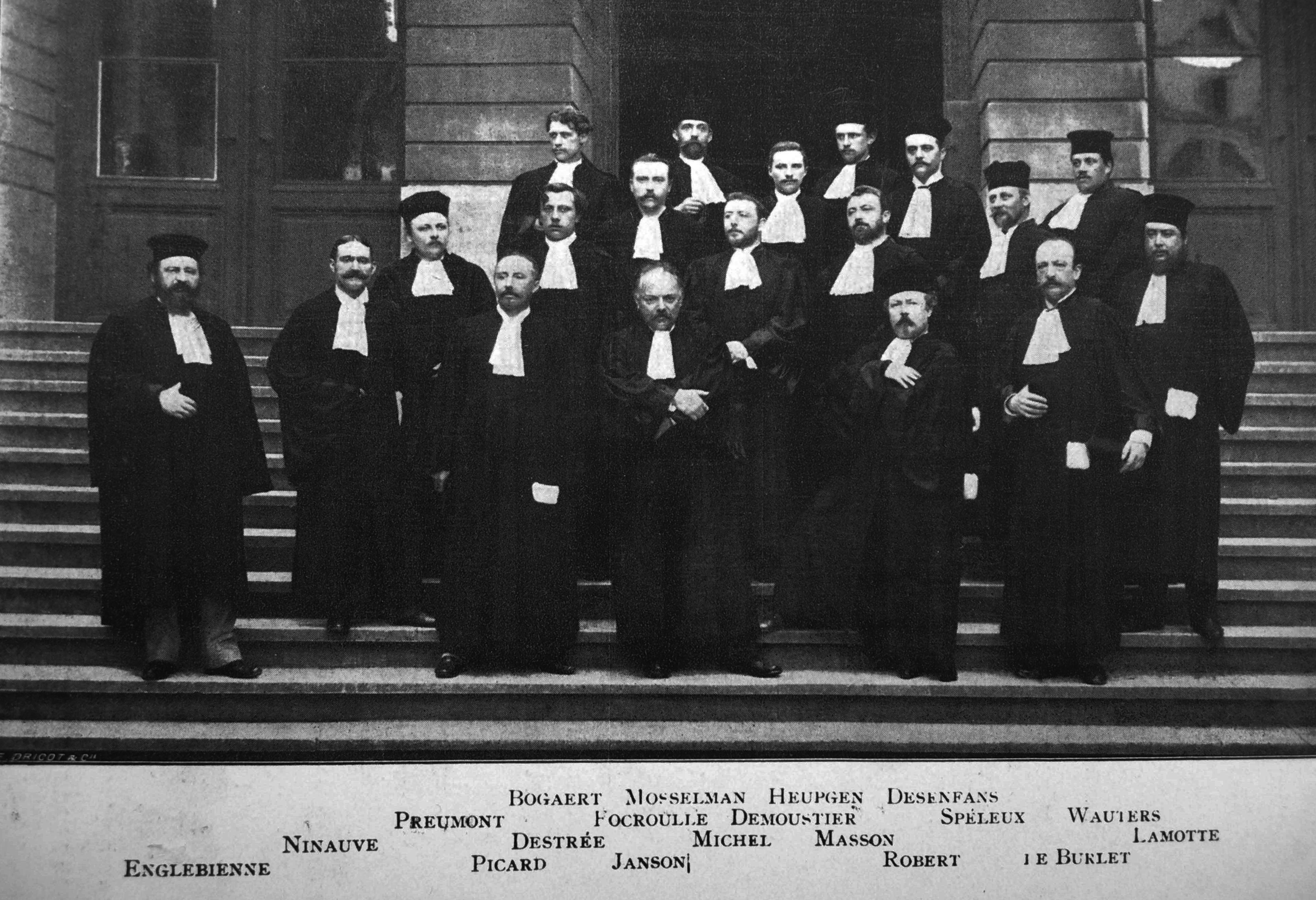
Defence lawyers at the Mons subversion trial, May 1889

- 6-25 May – Subversion trial in Mons reveals activity of security service agents provocateurs in the Parti socialiste républicain
- 3 July – FN Herstal arms manufactory founded
- 8 November – Higher Institute of Philosophy founded at Catholic University of Leuven

== Publications ==
- Napoléon de Pauw, Obituarium Sancti Johannis: Nécrologe de l'église St. Jean (St. Bavon) à Gand, du XIIIe au XVIe siècle (Brussels, F. Hayez)
- Alexis Marie Gouchet, La traite des nègres et le croisade africaine (Liège)

== Art and architecture ==
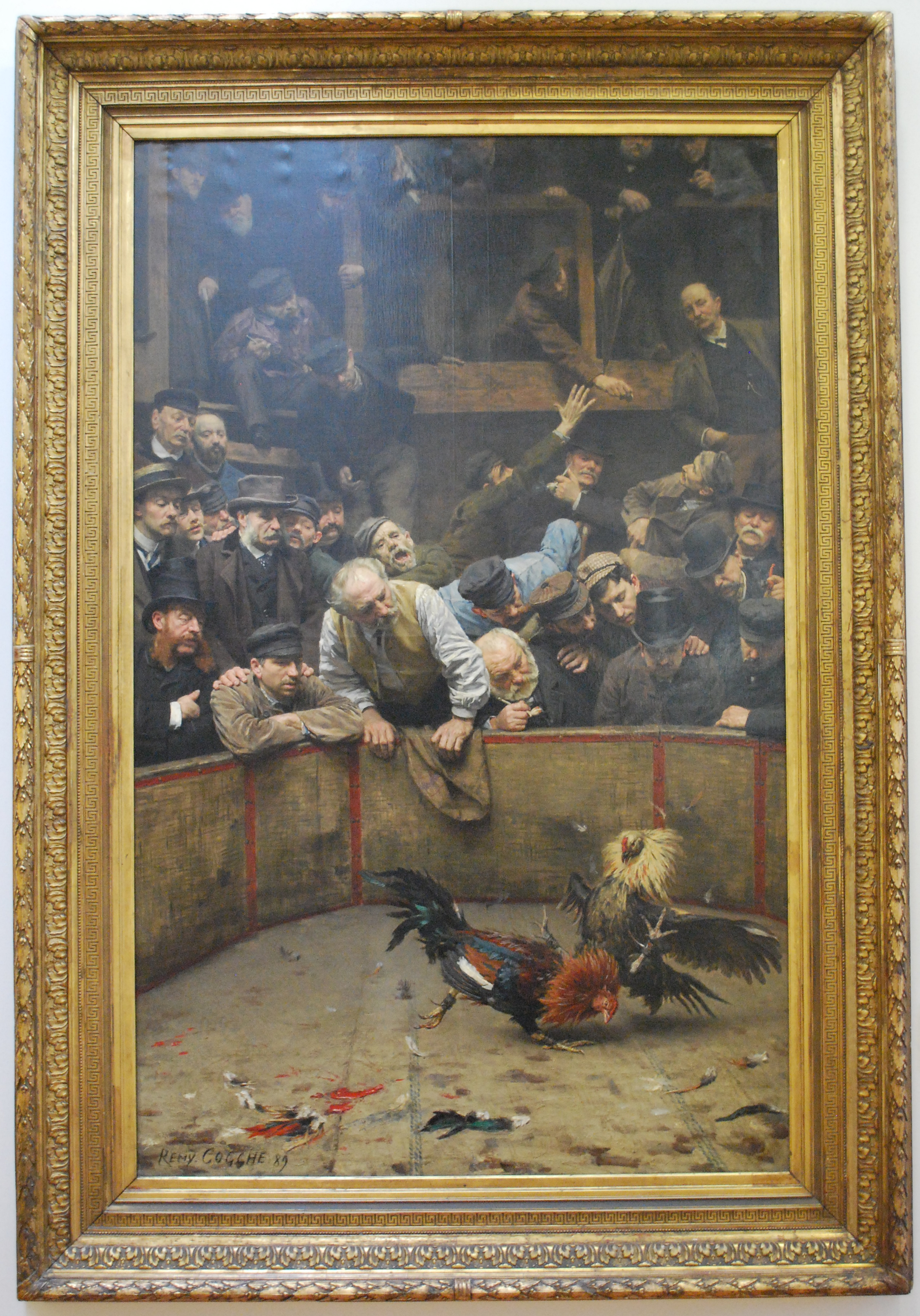
Rémy Cogghe, Cockfights in Flanders (1889)

Paintings

- Rémy Cogghe, Cockfights in Flanders
- James Ensor, Christ's Entry Into Brussels in 1889
- Léon Herbo, Salome
- Fernand Khnopff, Memories
- Constantin Meunier, Firedamp

== Births ==
- 18 March – Floris Jespers, artist (died 1965)
- 25 April – Paul Deman, cyclist (died 1961)
- 26 May – Victor Linart, cyclist (died 1977)
- 6 July – Louis Mottiat, cyclist (died 1972)
- 30 July – Frans Masereel, artist (died 1972)
- 8 October – Philippe Thys, cyclist (died 1971)
- 11 November – Marcel Buysse, cyclist (died 1939)
- 16 December – Joseph Van Daele, cyclist (died 1948)

== Deaths ==
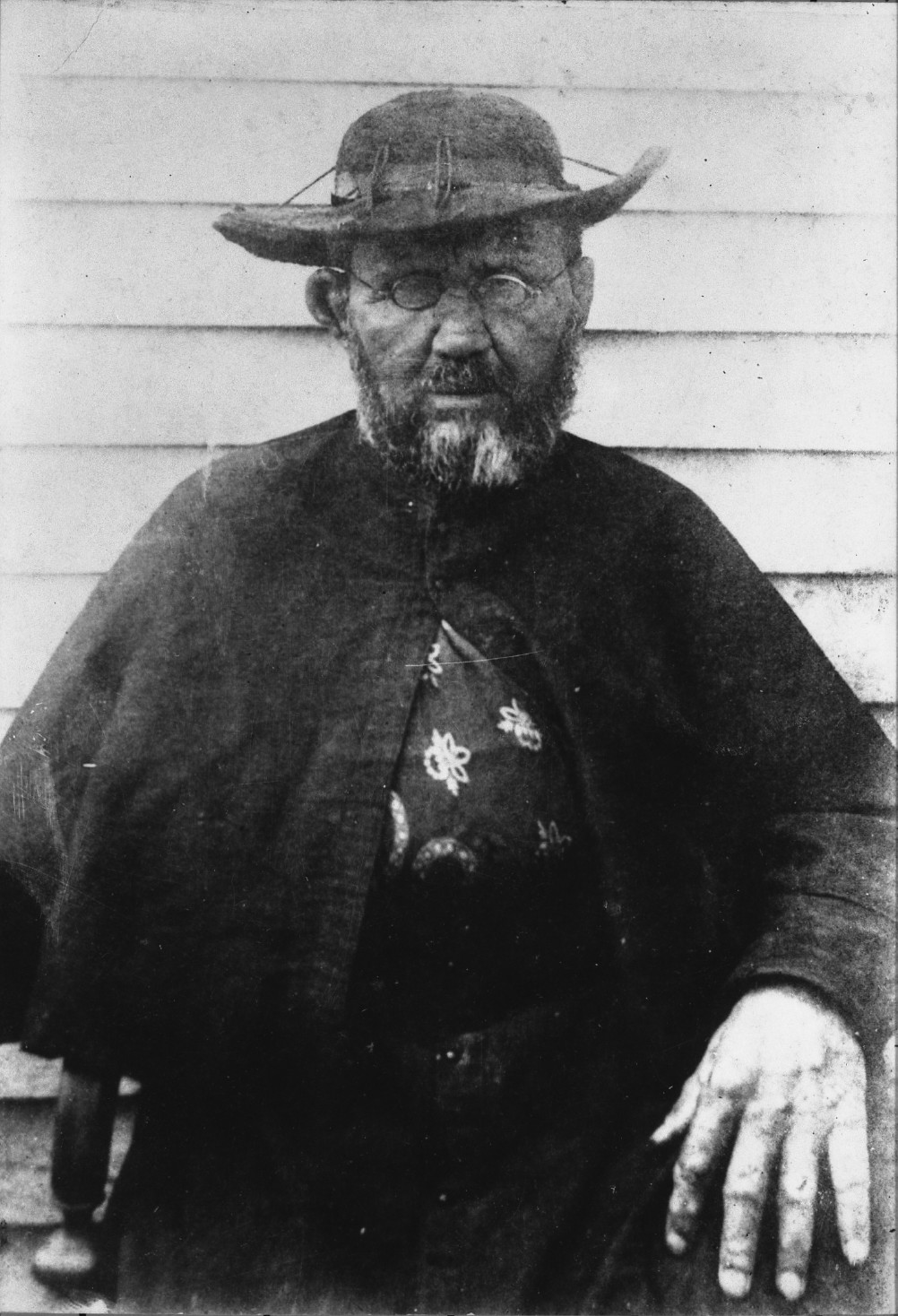
A photograph of Father Damien taken in February or March 1889, a few weeks before his death

- 15 April – Father Damien (born 1840), missionary
- 2 July – Henri-Charles Lambrecht (born 1848), bishop of Ghent
- 6 September – Guillaume d'Aspremont Lynden (born 1815), politician
- 30 September – François-Antoine Bossuet (born 1798), painter
- 16 October – Pierre-Joseph Witdoeck (born 1803), painter
