= Les Belges dans l'Afrique Centrale =

Multi-volume book about the colonization of the Congo basin

Les Belges dans l'Afrique Centrale. Voyages, aventures et découvertes d'après les documents et journaux d'explorateurs
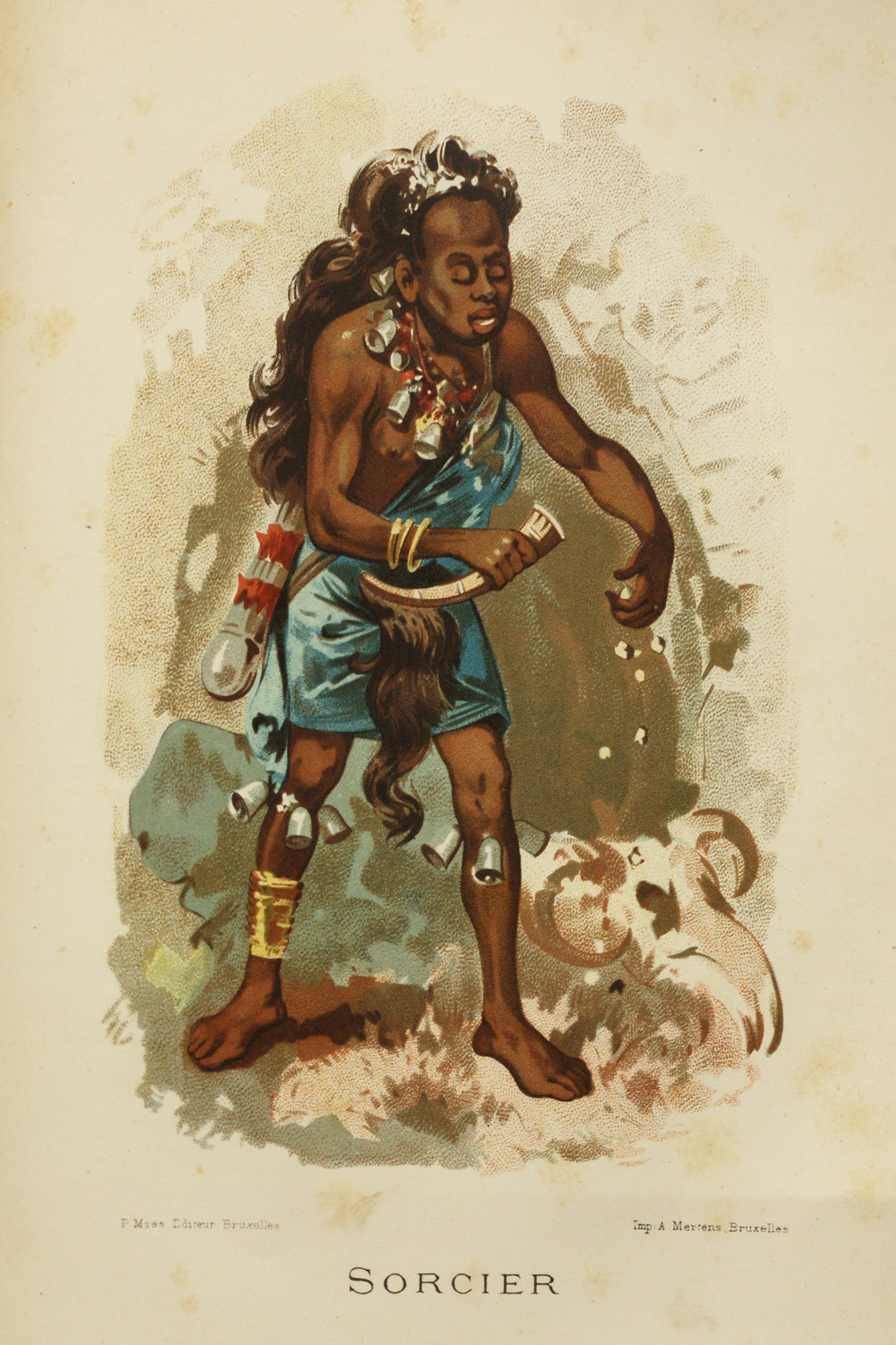
- Sorcerer from Les Belges dans l'Afrique Centrale
- Author: Pierre Maes
- Language: French
- Subject: travel account
- Publication place: Belgium

Les Belges dans l'Afrique Centrale. Voyages, aventures et découvertes d'après les documents et journaux d'explorateurs is a travel account composed of three volumes about the early years of the colonization of the Congo basin by Léopold II, which was published several times as both books and instalments between 1884 and 1893. The first volume was written by Adolphe Burdo (1849-1891) and subtitled De Zanzibar au Lac Tanganika. The second and third were written by Charles de Martrin-Donos (1857-1904) and subtitled Le Congo et ses affluents. The volumes were written to "popularize and glorify the civilizing African enterprise, and the Belgians who took part in it".

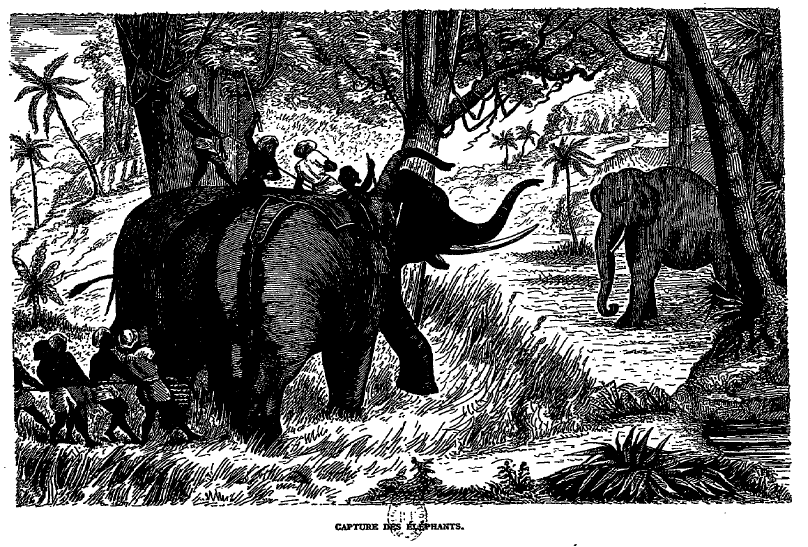
Capturing elephants from Les Belges dans l'Afrique Centrale

== Context ==
Pierre Maes was the editor of Les Belges dans l'Afrique Centrale and his publishing house was located in Brussels. Producing this travel account was his project and he hired Adolphe Burdo and Charles de Martrin-Donos to write the volumes. He had two interests in publishing those travel books. Firstly, travel writing was a popular genre in the late nineteenth century and selling such books thus ensured economic profit. Secondly, Pierre Maes produced Les Belges dans l'Afrique Centrale with the propagandist aim of supporting Léopold II's colonial project. Thus far, there has been no evidence enabling to link Maes to Léopold II's or his agents' own propagandist efforts. It is therefore probable that Maes belongs to the group of individual colonial enthusiasts which saw an occasion for economic profit in the king's colonial project. Additionally, the editor also published other books on central Africa. In 1886, he published translations in Dutch of Henry Morton Stanley's How I Found Livingstone (1873) and The Congo and the Founding of its Free State (1885).

Adolphe Burdo was born in Liège in 1849 and died in Paris in 1891. He was a Belgian explorer and participated in the third exploration of the Congo. His writings contain other travel accounts such as Bénoué et Niger, voyage dans l'Afrique centrale. and reports for the Royal Geographical Society. Although he authored the first volume of Les Belges dans l'Afrique Centrale, he was replaced by Martrin-Donos in 1885 because Maes was not satisfied with Burdo's contribution. In the editor's opinion, Burdo's contribution did not achieve the propagandist goal of his project. Consequently, the editor took the matter to court in March 1885 and Burdo was sentenced to pay a fine and edit his work. Charles de Martrin-Donos was recruited to finish the project. The latter was born in 1857 in Narbonne and died in 1904. He was a French baron and authored about a dozen books such as Verlaine intime: rédigé d'après les documents recueillis sur le roi des poètes par son ami et éditeur, Léon Vanier or Légendes et contes de Provence.

== Content ==
Les Belges dans l'Afrique Centrale roughly covers the period between the 1876 Brussels Geographic Conference and the 1885 Berlin Conference. The first event marks the moment at which Léopold II, king of the Belgians, started financing expeditions to the Congo basin through international associations such as the International African Association or International Association of the Congo. The second event was the occasion on which he was designated sovereign of the newly created Congo Free State.

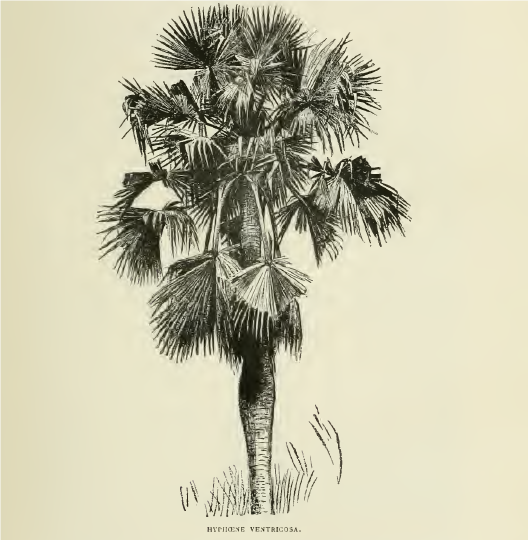
Palm tree from Les Belges dans l'Afrique centrale

== Successive editions ==
From November 1884 to December 1885, Burdo's and Martrin-Donos' contributions were published in instalments. In 1886, they were issued as books for the first time. In 1890, the volumes were edited a second time as books and instalments. Only the first volume was dated 1890 and their covers differed from the ones of 1884. In 1893, the three volumes were published once again, both as books and instalments, under a new title as well as under a new and sole author name, L. Hubert. This last version was given a more spectacular name La Conquête du Congo. Voyages émouvants & aventures dramatiques des explorateurs belges en Afrique. in an attempt to popularize the volumes. The first editions were aimed at an educated or intellectual audience whereas the last one was aimed at a more popular audience. The text of each volume was complemented by 150 to 200 illustrations, maps and engravings.

== About plagiarism ==
In 2006, an academic article on Les Belges dans L'Afrique Centrale was published in the Annales Aequotoria. Its authors, Emile Van Balberghe and Nadine Fettweis, demonstrated that Martrin-Donos’ volumes contain plagiarized excerpts from Charles Jeannest's Quatre années au Congo.

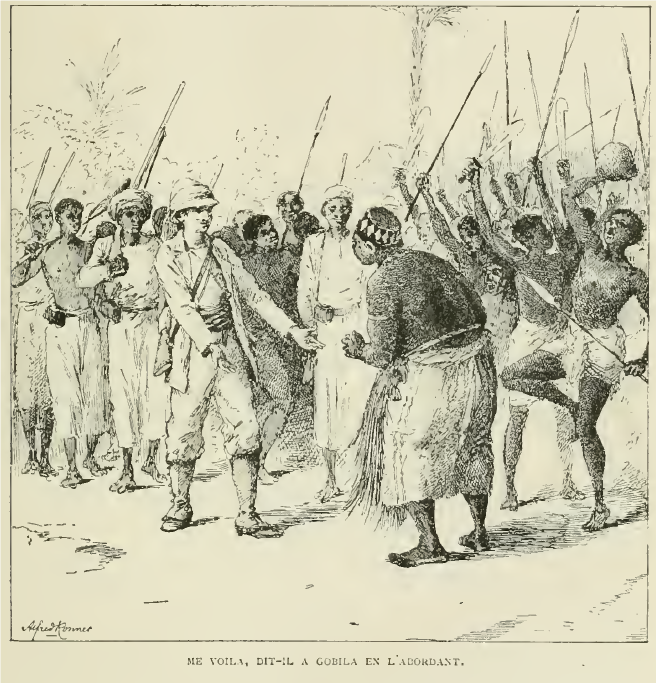
Gathering from Les Belges dans l'Afrique centrale

== Literature ==
- Belgian National Archives
- Burdo, A. (1886). Les Belges dans l’Afrique centrale. Voyages, aventures et découvertes d'après les documents et journaux d’explorateurs. De Zanzibar au Lac Tanganika. Bruxelles, Belgium: P. Maes.
- Fettweis, N. & Van Balberghe, E. (2006). Les Belges dans l'Afrique centrale d'Adolphe Burdo et Charles de Martrin-Donos. Commerce, propagande et plagiat. Annales Æquatoria, 27, 127–172.
- Martrin-Donos, de, C. (1886). Les Belges dans l'Afrique centrale. Voyages, aventures et découvertes d'après les documents et journaux d'explorateurs. Le Congo et ses affluents. Bruxelles, Belgium: P. Maes.
- Stanard, M. G. (2011). Selling the Congo: A history of European pro-empire propaganda and the making of Belgian imperialism. Lincoln, Neb.: Nebraska University Press.
- Zian, Y. (2011). Représentation des Arabo-Swahilis à travers les écrits des agents de Léopold II au Congo: Quand l'imaginaire se confronte au réel, 1876-1892. [Master's thesis, Université Libre de Bruxelles].
