= Revue catholique des idées et des faits =

Belgian weekly magazine

The Revue catholique des idées et des faits was a weekly review published in Belgium from 1921 to 1940. It was edited by René-Gabriel van den Hout and initially published under the patronage of Cardinal Mercier. The first issue appeared on 25 March 1921, and the last on 26 April 1940. A further issue was printed for publication in May 1940 but was never distributed due to the German invasion.

The editorial line was strongly influenced by Charles Maurras and came to represent more intransigently right-wing Catholic opinion in contrast to the constitutionalism and pragmatism of the Catholic Party. The editor, who regarded parliamentary democracy as a façade for the business interests that controlled affairs behind the scenes, expressed sympathy for Italian fascism in the 1920s and for Spanish nationalism in the 1930s. He opposed German Nazism and Belgian Rexism, but nevertheless called for authoritarian political reform in Belgium.
