= 1888 Belgian general election =

- 12 June 1888

69 of the 138 seats in the Chamber of Representatives 70 seats needed for a majority
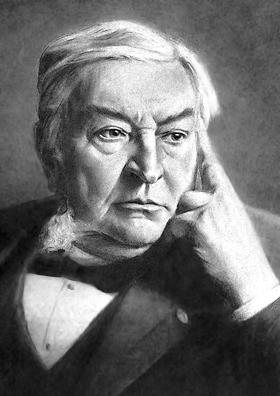

	First party	Second party
Leader	Auguste Beernaert
Party	Catholic	Liberal
Leader since	Candidate for PM
Seats before	98 seats	40 seats
Seats won	66	3
Seats after	98	40
Seat change	Steady	Steady
Popular vote	31,273	19,967
Percentage	58.44%	37.31%
Government before election
Beernaert
Catholic
Government after election
Beernaert
Catholic

Partial general elections were held in Belgium on 12 June 1888. The result was a victory for the Catholic Party, which won 98 of the 138 seats in the Chamber of Representatives and 47 of the 69 seats in the Senate.

Under the alternating system, elections were held in only five out of the nine provinces: Antwerp, Brabant, Luxembourg, Namur and West Flanders.

== Results ==
=== Chamber of Representatives ===
Party	Votes	%	Seats		
Party	Votes	%	Won	Total	+/–
Catholic Party	31,273	58.44	66	98	0
Liberal Party	19,967	37.31	3	40	0
Others	2,277	4.25	0	0	New
Total	53,517	100.00	69	138	0
Total votes	53,517	–			
Registered voters/turnout	73,276	73.03			
Source: Mackie & Rose, Sternberger et al.

=== Senate ===
Party	Seats
Catholic Party	47
Liberal Party	18
Independents	4
Total	69
Source: Sternberger et al.
