= Daniel Jacoby =

French lawyer (1933–2020)

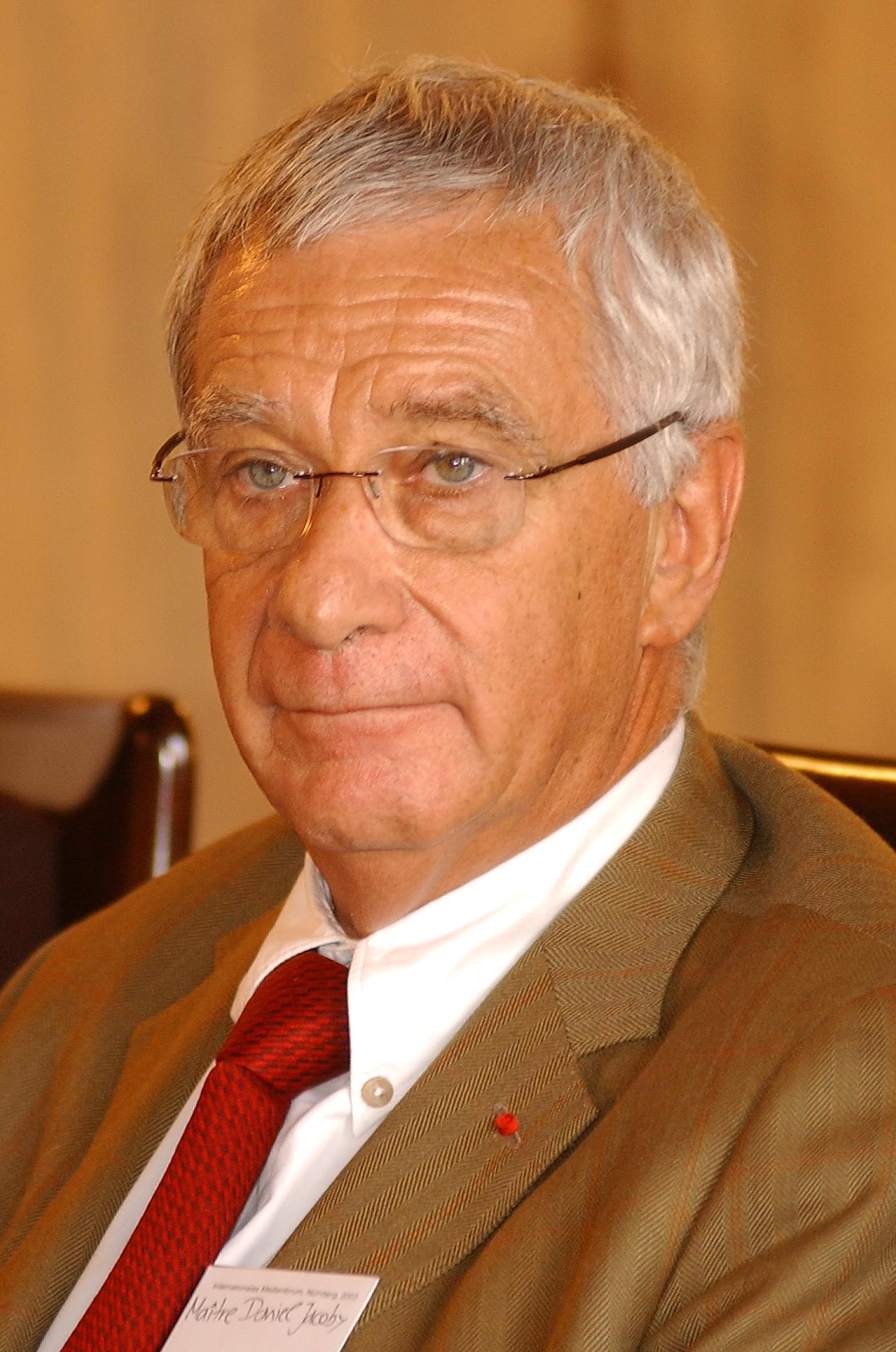
- Born: 14 August 1933; Saint-Mandé, France
- Died: 31 March 2020 (aged 86); Garches, France
- Occupations: Lawyer, human rights activist and writer
- Children: 3

Daniel Jacoby (14 August 1933 – 31 March 2020) was a French lawyer who specialised in intellectual property law, human rights activist and writer.

== Early and personal life ==
He was born in Saint-Mandé (Val de Marne) on 14 August 1933. He fathered three children, Manuela, Anne-Carine and Jean-David.

== Career ==
He began his career in the 1960s in the Paris Court of Appeal, defending fighters of the Algerian resistance of the war of independence, as well as adversaries of Franco and the Soviet regimes. In 1970, he became a member of the International Federation for Human Rights (F.I.D.H.) and was the first cousin of Justice Robert Badinter and French minister and the uncle of Zeev Gourarier French museum director.

=== International Federation for Human Rights président (F.I.D.H) ===
He became president between 1986 and 1995 and then became honorary president. In addition, he has participated in international judicial inquiries in different countries. For his work in the field of human rights, he was knighted and as an officer of the French Legion of Honor.

=== Writer ===
He illustrated himself as a writer with Albert Cohen, writing the preface of the book Les Inedits. He published his first novel in 2007 Le Placard à Balai edition Gallimard, then Le livre des tremblements edition the belles lettres.
