= Belgian State Railways Type 6 =

Class of 32 Belgian 2-6-0 locomotives

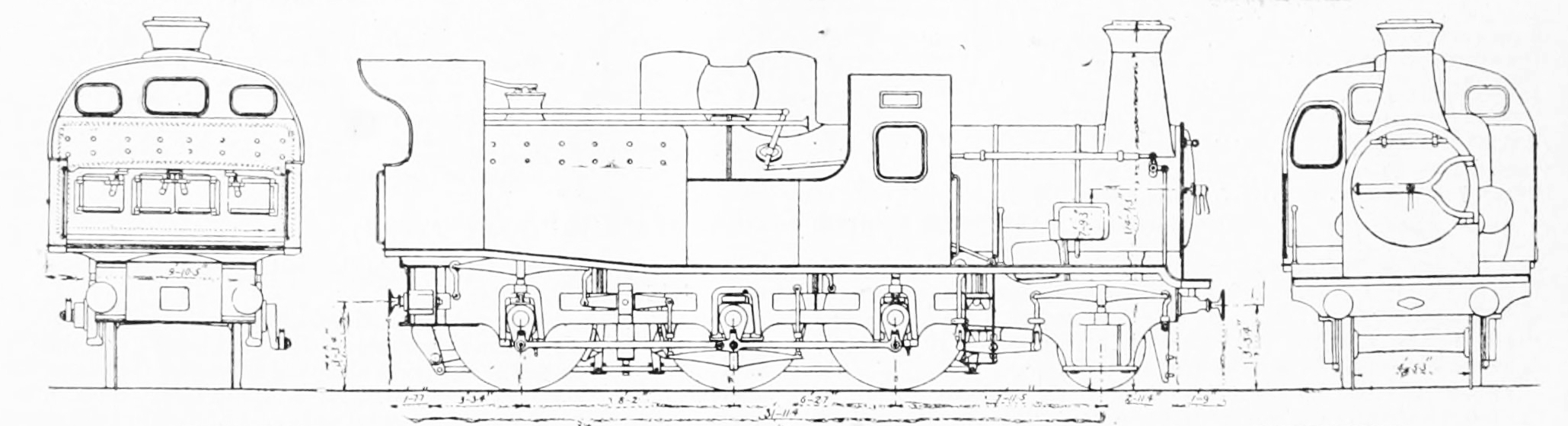
- Prototype locomotive 1818.
Type and origin
- Power type: Steam
- Build date: 1885–1894
- Total produced: 32
Specifications
- Configuration
  - Whyte: 2-6-0
  - UIC: 1C n2
- Gauge: 1,435 mm (4 ft 8 1/2 in) standard gauge
- Driver dia.: 1,700 mm (66.93 in)
- Wheelbase: 6.65 m (21 ft 9 3/4 in)
- Length: 9.8 m (32 ft 1 3/4 in)
- Axle load: 15.24 t (15.00 long tons; 16.80 short tons)
  - Leading: 11.88 t (11.69 long tons; 13.10 short tons)
  - 1st coupled: 12.66 t (12.46 long tons; 13.96 short tons)
  - 2nd coupled: 15.24 t (15.00 long tons; 16.80 short tons)
  - 3rd coupled: 14.28 t (14.05 long tons; 15.74 short tons)
- Loco weight: 54.06 t (53.21 long tons; 59.59 short tons)
- Firebox
  - Type: Belpaire
  - Grate area: 3.74 m^{2} (40.3 sq ft)
- Boiler pressure: 10 atm (1.01 MPa; 147 psi)
- Heating surface: 146.22 m^{2} (1,573.9 sq ft)
- Cylinders: Two, inside
- Cylinder size: 500 mm × 600 mm (19.69 in × 23.62 in)
- Valve gear: Walschaert
Performance figures
- Tractive effort: 5,924 kg (13,060 lb)
Career
- Operators: Belgian State Railways
- Class: Type 6

The Belgian State Railways Type 6 was a class of 2-6-0 steam locomotives for express passenger service on steep inclines, introduced in 1885. The three prototypes from 1885-1886 had a separate cab for the engineer, forward from the firebox, and would later be rebuilt to a more conventional arrangement with a single cab at the footplate.

They were superseded in 1897 by the similar but larger Type 16 Moguls, with twelve Type 6 receiving the improved Type 16 boiler that year. Owing to the deficiencies of the Belpaire firebox with a shallow grate, seven received new boilers with deep and narrow fireboxes, being reclassified as Type 6bis.

== Construction history ==
The locomotives were built by various manufacturers from 1885 to 1894. The machines had an outside frame and inside cylinders and a Walschaert valve gear.

Known production numbers
Manufacturer / factory number	Quantity	Date in service	État Belge numbers / Note
Cockerill 1411	1	1884	EB 1818 (prototype)
Cockerill 1456, 1480	2	1886	EB 1825, 235
Haine-Saint-Pierre 385 – 387	3	1889	EB 100 (1C), 156 – 157 (1B1)
Haine-Saint-Pierre	1	1891	EB 159
Franco-Belge 694 – 696	3	1889	EB 101, 105, 109
Franco-Belge 790 – 793	4	1891 – 1894	EB 81, 92, 94, 117
Franco-Belge 861 – 865	5	1892	EB 2101 – 2105
Franco-Belge 676 – 679	4	1893	EB 2111 – 2114
Franco-Belge 1000	1	1894	EB 39
Couillet 1011 – 1013	3	1891	EB 184, 224, 423
Couillet 1044 – 1048	5	1892	EB 2106 – 2110

== Bibliography ==
- Tordeur, Emile (1909). Le Machiniste des Chemins de Fer Belges (in French).
- Dambly, Phil (Dec 1966). "Nos inoubliables vapeurs - Cinquième période, 1884-1898 – Régime Masui et Belpaire". Le Rail (in French). No. 124.
- Morandiere, Jules (Jan 1886). "Les locomotives à l'Exposition d'Anvers 1885". Revue générale des chemins de fer (in French). 9, 1er Semestre. Paris: P. Vicq-Dunod: 33–47. OCLC 6536095.
- Deghilage (May 1890). "Les locomotives Belges pour voie normale, à l'Exposition Universelle de 1889". Revue générale des chemins de fer (in French). 13, 1er Semestre. Paris: P. Vicq-Dunod: 297–310. OCLC 6536095.
- Vandenberghen, J. (1988). Période Belpaire - Masui (in French). Bruxelles: SNCB.
- Dagant, André (1974). "Cent vingt-cinq ans de construction de locomotives à vapeur en Belgique". Bulletin de l'Institut archéologique liégeois (in French). 86. Liège: Maison Curtius: 23–244.
- "Stoomlocomotieven Type 6 / Type 16" (PDF). L.S.V. Tijdschrift (in Dutch). 86. As: Limburgse Stoom Vereniging: 1–10. June–July 1998.
