= René-Gabriel van den Hout =

Belgian priest and editor

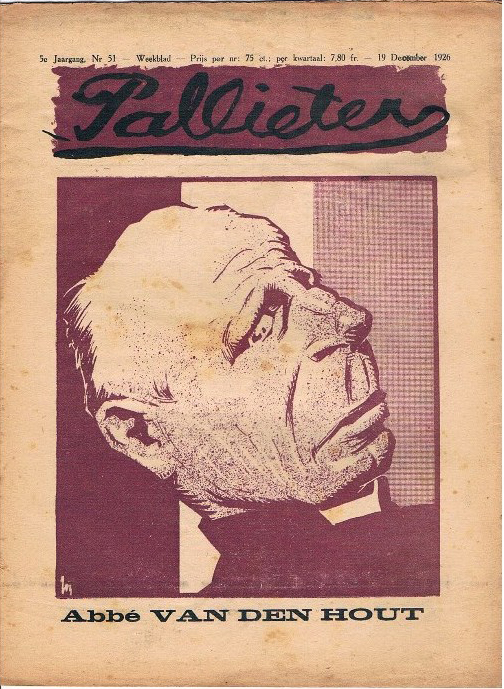
Caricature of René-Gabriel van den Hout by Jos De Swerts

René-Gabriel van den Hout (1886–1969) was a Belgian Catholic priest and the editor of Revue catholique des idées et des faits (1921–1940).

== Life ==
Van den Hout was born in Antwerp on 4 February 1886. His grandfather was a carpenter and his father was a shipping clerk. He was sent to secondary school at the Jesuit college in Namur, and went on to study at the Jesuit commercial college in Antwerp but was prevented from completing his studies by ill health. In 1910, having worked for several years in the commercial sector, he felt a call to the priesthood and sought an interview with Cardinal Mercier. He spent three years studying at the Leo XIII Seminary and the Higher Institute of Philosophy at the Catholic University of Leuven.

During the German occupation of Belgium in World War I, Mercier had him produce a translation of Emil Prüm's Der Witwenstand der Wahrheit, which was clandestinely printed as Le Veuvage de la vérité: une réponse aux catholiques allemands. Van den Hout was ordained to the priesthood in Mechelen on 24 September 1916 and was appointed to the staff of the Institut Saint-Louis in Brussels. From February 1917 to November 1918, he was responsible for publishing the clandestine newspaper that would become La Libre Belgique. After the war he undertook a number of confidential missions for the cardinal, particularly relating to the Paris Peace Conference.

In 1921, van den Hout founded the Revue catholique des idées et des faits, which he edited until it closed in May 1940. For three years he also co-edited Le Vingtième Siècle. His review, unusually for a publication that took the name "Catholic" in the title, was not subject to ecclesiastical censorship. Influenced by Charles Maurras and sympathetic to Italian fascism and Spanish nationalism, he opposed German Nazism and Belgian Rexism. In the summer of 1940 van den Hout was a refugee in France, where he became chaplain to General Henri Denis's staff. He was involved in fruitless plans to found an international review and to forge a Mediterranean "Eurafrican" alliance as a counterweight to the Nazism that then seemed victorious in northern Europe.

Van den Hout returned to Belgium at the end of 1941, and in 1942 was appointed to a parish in Brussels. At his appointment, Cardinal Van Roey instructed him to keep out of politics. As a parish priest, he was active in encouraging ecumenism and support for foreign missions. He celebrated his jubilee in 1966 and retired in 1967, dying in Brussels on 14 January 1969.

== Works ==
- La crise belge: essai de diagnostic d'une mentalité néfaste à l'unité nationale (1930)
