= Félix Rousseau =

Félix Rousseau (1887–1981) was a Belgian historian.

Rousseau was born at Namur on 14 January 1887 and died there on 7 September 1981.

== Publications (selected) ==
- 1921: Henri l'Aveugle, comte de Namur et de Luxembourg, 1136-1196
- 1936: Actes des comtes de Namur de la première race, 946-1196
- 1942: Introduction historique à l'art mosan
- 1951: Le Namurois; introduction et notes de Félix Rousseau; photographies de R. Tamines, J. Cayet et Ch. Dessart
- 1952: Le Mariage d'Ermesinde de Namur et de Thibaut de Bar, 1189 ou 1196-1197?
- 1967: La Wallonie, terre romane; 4e édition revue et augmentée
- 1970: L'Art mosan, introduction historique. 2ème édition
- 1971: Légendes et coutumes du pays de Namur
- 1977: À travers l'histoire de Namur, du Namurois et de la Wallonie. Recueil d'articles de Félix Rousseau
- 1993: La Wallonie, terre romane (sixième éd.); L'Art mosan (troisième éd.)
- --?--: Namur, ville mosane
