= Alexis Deswaef =

Belgian human rights activist (born 1969)

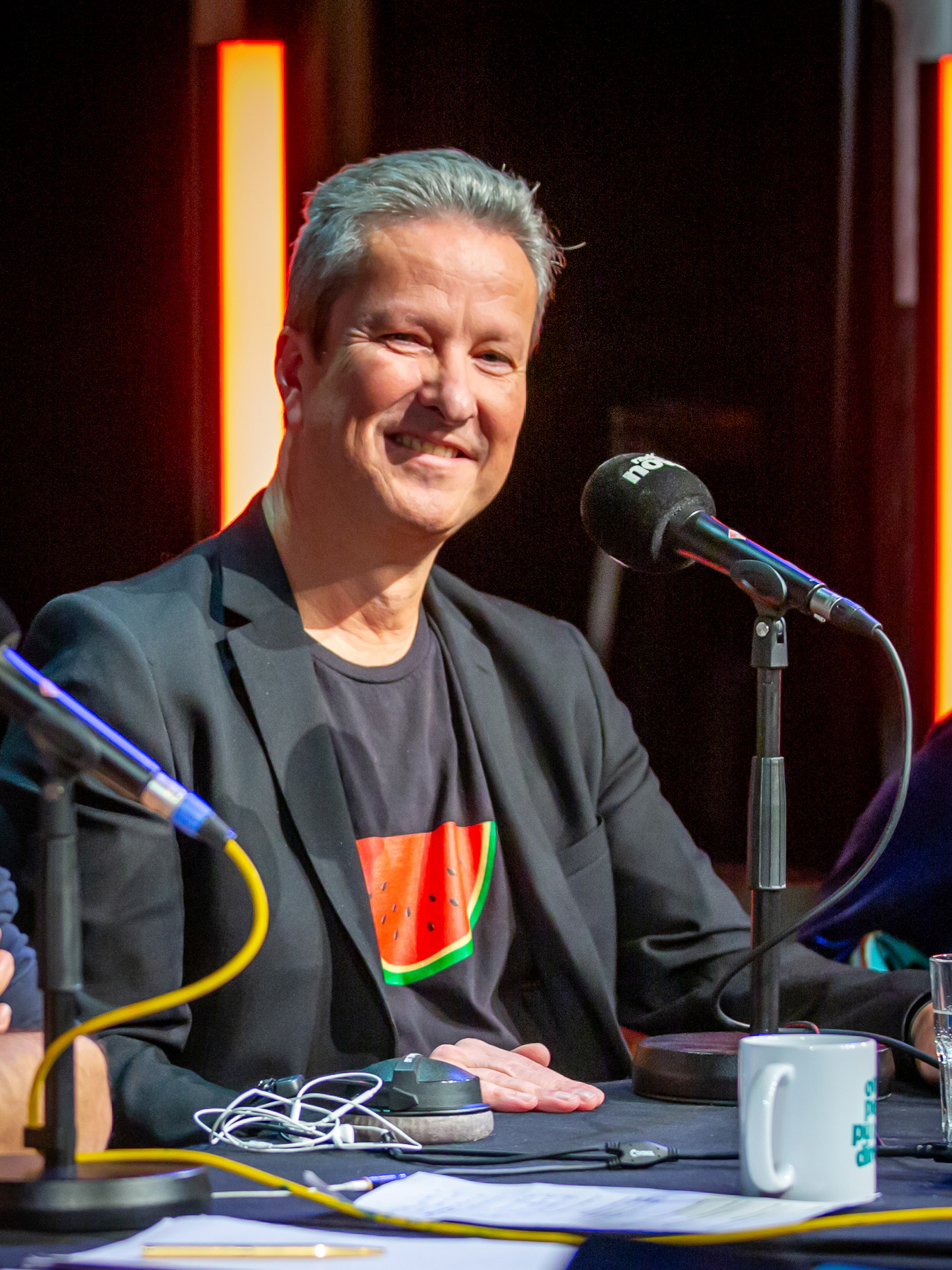
- Deswaef in 2026
- Born: 1969 (age 56–57); Ostend, West Flanders, Belgium
- Education: University of Louvain
- Occupation: Lawyer
- Organization: Human Rights League
- Known for: Support of migrant rights

Alexis Deswaef (born 1969) is a Belgian lawyer and human rights activist. He is known for his advocacy for the rights of asylum seekers and refugees living in Belgium. Between 2011 and 2018, Deswaef was the chair of the Human Rights League.

== Early life ==
Deswaef was born and raised in Ostend, West Flanders, in a bilingual French-Dutch-speaking home. His father ran a wood import company and his mother was a podiatrist. Deswaef completed his secondary education at Sint-Leocollege in Bruges and graduated from the University of Louvain with a degree in law in 1994. He subsequently completed an internship at a law firm in which he defended homeless people.

== Human rights advocacy ==
As a human rights lawyer, Deswaef has frequently appeared on French and Dutch language media in Belgium to discuss human rights, particularly issues impacting asylum seekers and refugees. He has been critical of various Belgian governments, including former Prime Minister Charles Michel and his secretary of state for asylum and migration, Theo Francken.

In 2012, Deswaef published a book, Israël-Palestine: au cœur de l'étau, about a trip he had taken alongside other human rights lawyers to Israel in Palestine, in which he criticised what he observed to be a series of international law violations by Israeli authorities against Palestinians, including the establishment of settlements in the West Bank, the construction of the West Bank barrier, the detention of political prisoners and the exploitation of Palestinian resources. He described the Israeli government as being an "apartheid regime".

In 2017, Deswaef publicly criticised a deal between Francken and the Sudanese ambassador in Brussels to repatriate Sudanese citizens living illegally in Belgium back to Sudan. Deswaef accused Francken of collaborating with the Sudanese government, which he described as a "dictatorship" led by Omar al-Bashir, who had been prosecuted by the International Criminal Court, and further cited evidence of the high rate of successful asylum applications by Sudanese citizens as evidence of the dangers of deportation.

In 2021, Deswaef acted as the lawyer of the family of Ibrahima Barrie, an immigrant from sub-Saharan Africa who had died in Brussels shortly after being arrested by police officers.

In 2023, Deswaef criticised the use of "preventative arrests" by the police against 20 young people at the Place de la Monnaie in Brussels, which he did not feel met the criteria of being "exceptional and proportionate", citing it as an example of police violence. The police chief of Brussels, Michel Goovaerts, later alleged that information had been received that the people arrested had previously purchased balaclavas and hammers.

In 2025, Deswaef took part in the Global Sumud Flotilla and was subsequently arrested by the Israeli army.

== Criminal charges, trial and acquittal ==
On 2 April 2016, Deswaef was among 16 people who were arrested during an anti-fascist demonstration at the Palais de la Bourse; he was briefly detained in Etterbeek before being released without charge.

In July 2019, Pierre Vandersmissen, the former head of law enforcement in Brussels responsible for managing public demonstrations, filed a criminal case against Deswaef, accusing him of "harassment and contempt" between 2008 and 2016. Vandersmissen had previously filed a complaint against Deswaef, which had been dismissed; Deswaef had also previously filed a complaint against Vandersmissen, accusing him of arbitrary arrest. The Human Rights League called the charges against Deswaef as "very worrying", describing them as "police intimidation and an attack on freedom of expression".

In July 2021, Deswaef was acquitted of all charges, with his public statements made against Vandersmissen and the Brussels police deemed to fall within the scope of freedom of expression.
