= Philippe Kervyn de Volkaersbeke =

Belgian politician (1815–1881)

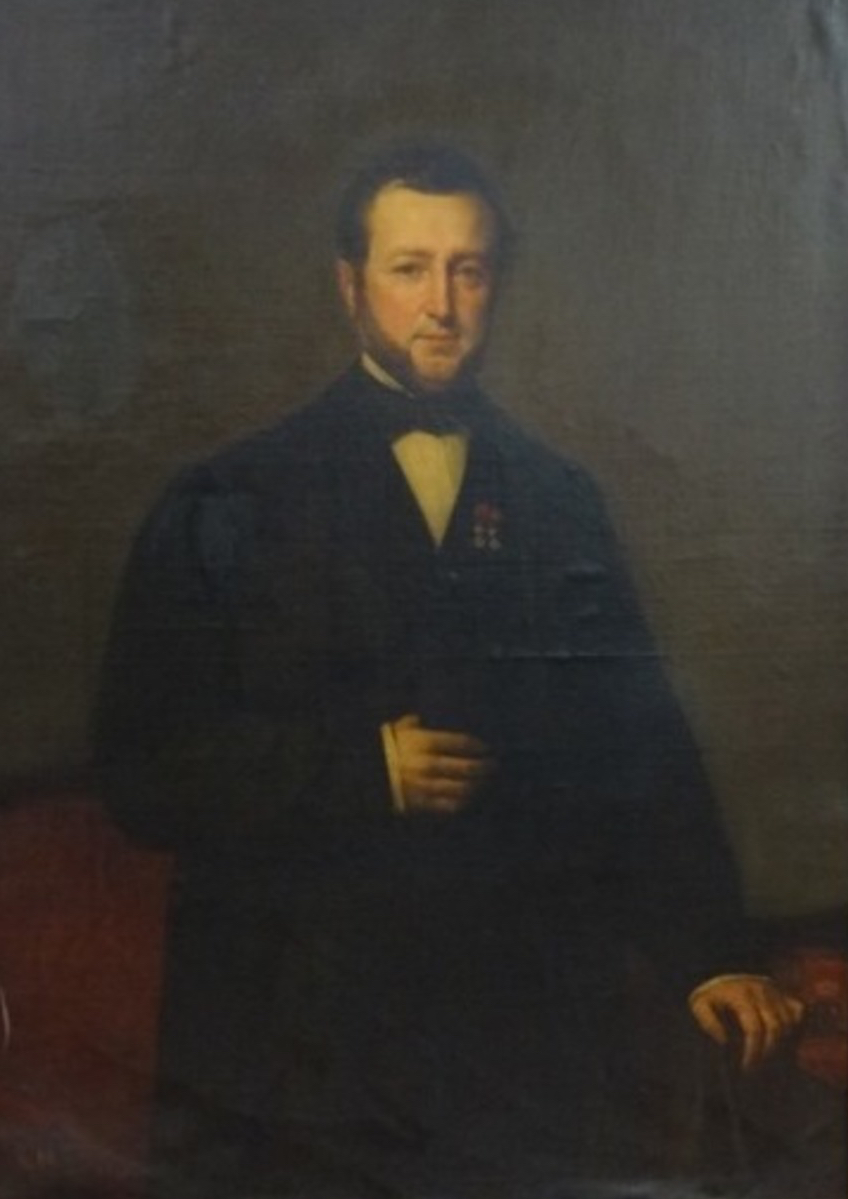

Philippe Kervyn de Volkaersbeke (19 April 1815 - 15 July 1881) was a Belgian politician and antiquary.

== Life ==
Kervyn de Volkaersbeke was born in Sint-Niklaas on 19 April 1815, the son of Jean Charles Kervyn de Volkaersbeke and Angélique Léonie de Nève. After secondary school in Brussels, he studied at the University of Ghent without taking a degree.

From 1854 to 1857 he served on Ghent city council as alderman of public works, extending the city library. In 1861 he succeeded his father-in-law as mayor of Nazareth, Belgium, retaining that position until his death.

In the 1861 parliamentary elections he was elected from the arrondissement of Ghent. He was not re-elected in the 1864 elections, but he again represented the same constituency from 1870 to 1878. His maiden speech in the Chamber of Representatives, on 11 June 1861, was against the Anglo-Belgian Treaty of Commerce and Navigation then being negotiated, which he saw as a threat to Ghent's textile industry. He took an active part in parliamentary debates on the budgets for home affairs and public works, demonstrating concern for the bridges, roads and telegraph lines in his own constituency, as well as for the enlargement of the Ghent–Terneuzen Canal, but also for the better accommodation of the National Archives of Belgium and the State Archives in Ghent, better wages and working conditions for librarians and archivists in state employ, and an increase in the subsidy to Ghent conservatory. He ensured that the Geeraard de Duivelsteen was acquired by the state to house the State Archives in Ghent.

Before and during his political career, he was active in cultural and literary societies, and published on antiquarian themes. In 1850 he became one of the directors of the Messager des sciences historiques, to which he was a frequent contributor throughout his life. He published several books, two articles in the Annales de l'Académie d'Archéologie d'Anvers, and sixteen items in the Biographie Nationale de Belgique, ten on members of the Borluut family. In 1878 he was appointed to the committee preparing the festivities for the celebration of the fiftieth anniversary of Belgian independence.

He died in Nazareth, Belgium, on 15 July 1881.

== Writings ==
- Histoire généalogique et héraldique de quelques familles de Flandres (Ghent, multiple volumes, 1848 onwards)
- with J. Diegerick, Documents inédits concernant les Troubles des Pays-Bas, 1577-1584 (2 vols., Ghent, 1848–1850)
- Verslag van 't magistraet van Gent nopens de godsdienstige beroerten aldaer, loopende van den 30 junij 1566 tot den 30 april 1567, gevolgd door talrijke bewijsstukken (Ghent, 1850)
- Le Songe d'un antiquaire: nouvelle fantastique (Ghent, 1853)
- Correspondance de François de la Noue, surnommé Bras de fer, accompagnée de notes historiques et précédée de la vie de ce grand capitaine (Ghent and Paris, 1854)
- Les Eglises de Gand (2 vols., Ghent, 1857–1858).
- Mémoires sur les Troubles de Gand, 1577-1579, par François de Halewyn, seigneur de Zwevegem (Brussels, 1865)
- Les Pourbus (Ghent, 1870)
- Les Missions diplomatiques de Pierre Anchement, 1492-1506 (Ghent, 1873)
