= Jean-François Abeloos =

- Born: 14 December 1819; Leuven, United Kingdom of the Netherlands
- Died: 6 August 1886 (aged 66); Leuven, Belgium
- Education: Leuven Academy of Fine Arts

Jean-François Abeloos (1819–1886) was a Belgian sculptor and art educator.

== Life ==
Abeloos was born in Leuven on 14 December 1819, the son of Pierre Abeloos and Catherine Van den Put. He trained as a sculptor under Karel Geerts at the Leuven Academy of Fine Arts, as did his younger brother Michaël Abeloos. In 1855, he succeeded Geerts in his position at the Academy.

He was also a practising sculptor, exhibiting a Madonna and a St. Cecilia at the Brussels Salon of 1854 and working on the restoration of Leuven Town Hall around 1860, for which he also produced a series of busts. He was particularly active in religious sculpture, executing works for churches throughout Belgium. Works by Abeloos preserved in the chapel of the Petit Séminaire in Mechelen include a mise au tombeau (a depiction of the Burial of Jesus) and a chemin de croix (the Stations of the Cross).

He died in Leuven on 6 August 1886 from typhoid fever.
