= Raoul Van Overstraeten =

Belgian officer

Raoul François Casimir Van Overstraeten (Ath, 29 January 1885—Brussels, 30 January 1977) was a Belgian general who fought during the First World War and Second World War and, from 1938 to 1940, military adviser of king Leopold III of Belgium.

== Early life ==
Van Overstraeten spoke Dutch and French fluently, since his father was a Fleming and his mother a Wallonian. Furthermore, he spoke English and German. His father was an officer at the infantry and ended his career as a general.

== First World War ==
During the German invasion of Belgium, Van Overstraeten was a part of the first line in Liège. He participated in the Battle of Halen, the siege of Antwerp, and the Race to the Sea. In 1916, he went to the Belgian Congo as a volunteer and participated in the Battle of Tabora under general Charles Tombeur in German East Africa.

== Second World War ==
From 1938 to 1940, Raoul Van Overstraeten was the military adviser of King Leopold III. He refused the function of chief of staff. Minister Paul-Henri Spaak characterised him as "by far the most intelligent of all military personnel. The drawback is that he knows it himself."

After the German invasion of Belgium in 1940, he remained in the country, living in Brussels, and was not interned by the occupying forces. On 19 November 1940, Leopold III met Adolf Hitler in Berchtesgaden. Van Overstraeten organised the meeting.

In 1944, Van Overstraeten, mistrusted by the Allies, was passed over for a leading role in the reconstituted Belgian armed forces. Two years later, he retired, and subsequently wrote four books based on his archives.

== Publications ==
- Raoul van Overstraeten (1921). Des principes de la guerre à travers les ages: Cartes et plans. Impr. du Ministère de la défense nationale.
- M. Tasnier (and Overstraeten (R. van)) (1923). L'Armée Belge Dans la Guerre Mondiale. [With Plates and Maps.].
- Raoul van Overstraeten (1946). Albert I-Leopold III: vingt ans de politique militaire belge 1920-1940. Desclee de Brouwer.
- Raoul van Overstraeten (1954). The War Diaries of Albert I, King of the Belgians. Kimber.
- Raoul Van Overstraeten (1960). Dans l'etau. Plon.
