= Sint-Leocollege (Brugge) =

Coordinates: 51.2141°N 3.229281°E

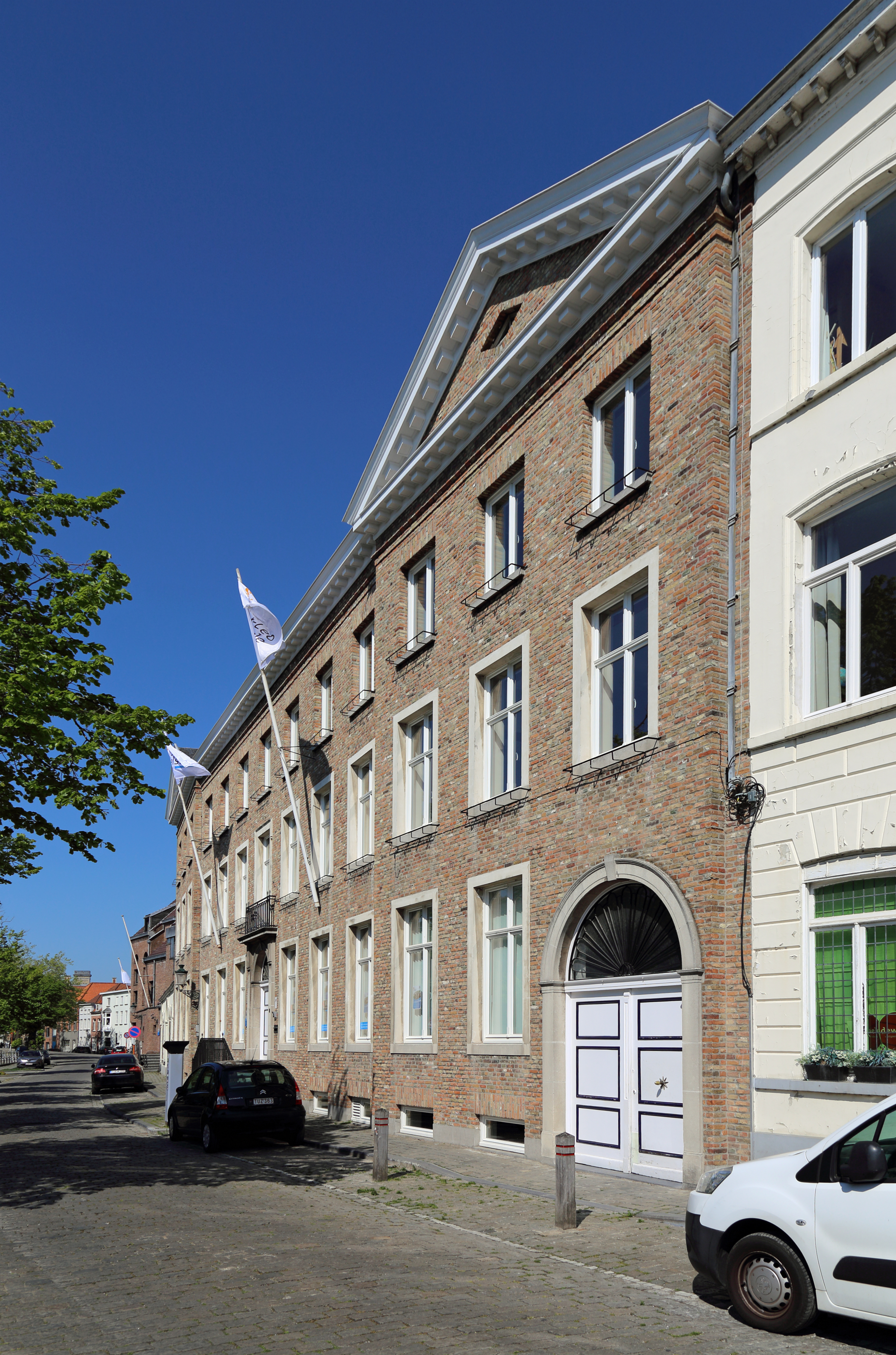
- Potterierei 11 Bruges; Belgium

Information
- Type: Public
- Established: 1890
- Principal: Koen Declerck
- Colors: Blue & Orange
- Mascot: Lion
- Website: www.sint-leocollege.be

Sint-Leocollege was a Catholic high school and elementary school in Bruges, Belgium. Sint-Leocollege was established in 1890 as a private boys' school. In 1916, it was transformed into a public school and in 1993, girls were first allowed to take classes.

== History ==
In May 1890, the Diocese of Bruges was able to acquire the building of the former English Seminary (located on the site where the Carmelite monastery used to stand) along the Potterierei, with the intention of housing a school there that would become a branch of Sint-Lodewijkscollege, which had already been in existence for over fifty years at that time. While Sint-Lodewijkscollege was an elite school for classical studies including Latin and Greek, Sint-Leocollege was meant to be a 'modern secondary school,' focusing primarily on languages, commerce, and mathematics.

Changes in the educational offerings meant that starting from the 1960s, Sint-Leocollege could also provide a broader range of courses, including the classical studies of Latin and Greek.

In January 2015, the governing authority decided to merge Sint-Leocollege and Hemelsdaele starting from September 1, 2015, under the name "Sint-Leo Hemelsdaele." The uniform was not introduced.

The secondary department fully occupies the premises of Sint-Leocollege, located between Potterierei, Carmersstraat, and Elisabeth Zorghestraat. The buildings of Hemelsdaele, situated between Sint-Jansstraat, Wapenmakersstraat, and Sint-Walburgastraat, house the primary school. The boarding facilities were partially retained.

In 2023, the governing authority decided to merge with the school board encompassing, among others, VTI-Brugge.

== Notable alumni ==
- Pieter Aspe, writer
- Dirk De fauw, politician
- Alexis Deswaef, human rights lawyer
- Tuur Dierckx, footballer
- Karel Dobbelaere, sociologist of religion
- Nicolas Lombaerts, footballer
- Bart Moeyaert, writer
