= Adolphe Burdo =

Belgian officer, writer and traveller

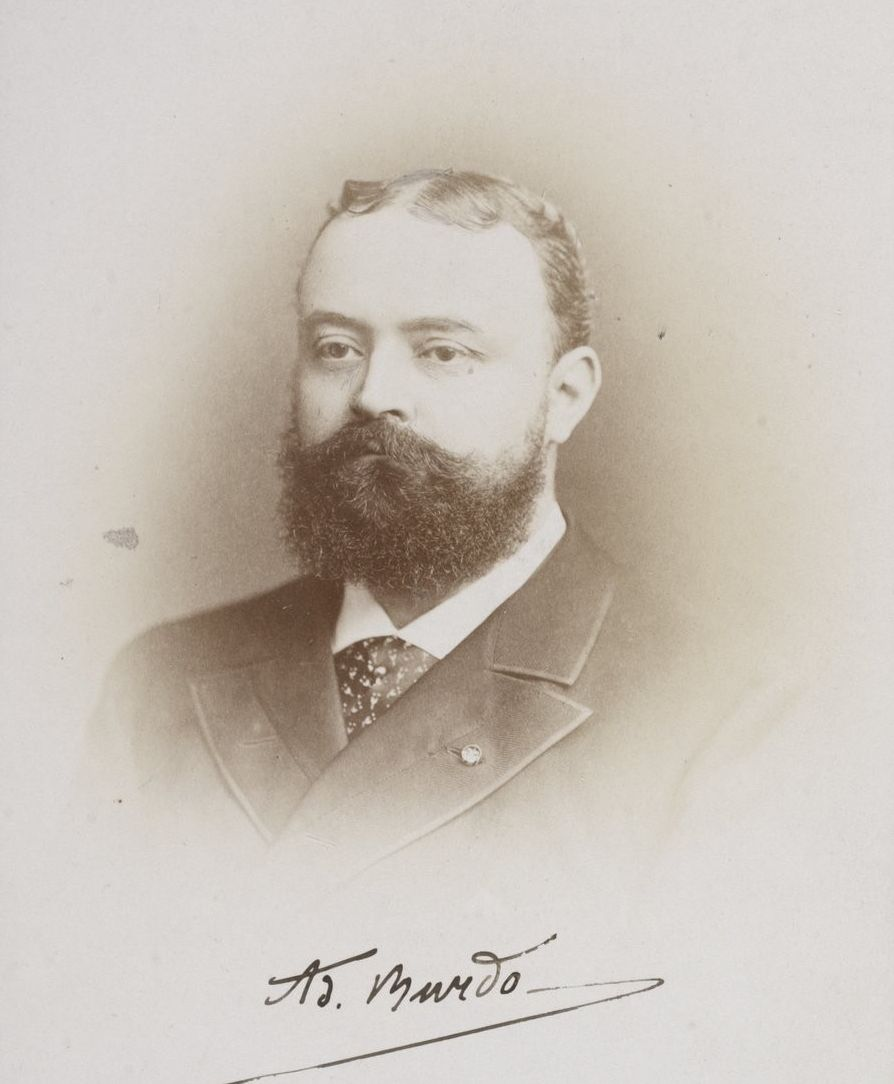
Photo (1880) of Burdo by Aimé Dupont

Adolphe Marie Louis Burdo (born 31 January 1849 in Liège; died, probably also in Liège, at an unknown date) was a Belgian officer, writer and traveller.

Adolphe Marie Louis Burdo was an officer in the Belgian Army. During the 1870s, he travelled in western Africa, making a journey from Dakar to the Niger and Benue rivers. By 1879, he was back in Belgium. In November of the same year, he received permission from King Leopold II during an to audience to go to Congo, and subsequently associated himself with the International African Association. He left Brussels in December the same year as a volunteer with the association, and spent almost two years in present-day Tanzania before returning to Belgium. He wrote several books about his travels in Africa, and together with Charles de Martrin–Donos he authored a three-volume work on Belgian exploration in Congo. He was a member of the Société Royale Belge de Géographie.
