= Clémentine Louant =

French aviator, novelist, poet

Clémentine Rolande Louant (1831–1915) was a Belgian poet, novelist and publicist.

== Life ==
Louant was born in Charleroi on 3 March 1831. Her poetry tended towards nature themes, in particular botanical and ornithological observation. In 1879–1880 she served on the organising committee of the literary and bibliographical exhibition that was part of the national celebrations of the fiftieth anniversary of Belgian independence. She also collaborated with several journals and reviews, including L'Éducation populaire (Charleroi) and L'Omnibus illustré (Tournai), as well as contributing to Le Dimanche (Lille) and the Journal des gens de lettres belges (Brussels). In 1888 she had a press pass for the International Congress of Science and Industry held in Brussels.

In 1882 she married the Brussels merchant Guillaume Matyn, a widower, but she continued to publish under her maiden name. Her husband commissioned the Matyn House (1890) from Victor Horta. Louant was a member of the Société d’Archéologie de Bruxelles and in 1894 she lent some pieces from her own collection for an exhibition of antique lace being organised at the Royal Academy of Fine Arts, Brussels. She was widowed in 1895, and died in 1915.

== Works ==
Poetry

- Poésies (1864)
- Les Fleurettes (1865)

Prose

- Le bonheur d'Andrée (1886)
- Pauvre Germaine! (1888)
