= Auguste Beernaert =

Prime Minister of Belgium and human rights activist

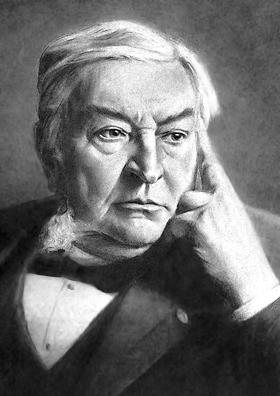

Prime Minister of Belgium
- In office 26 October 1884 – 26 March 1894
- Monarch: Leopold II
- Preceded by: Jules Malou
- Succeeded by: Jules de Burlet

President of the Chamber of Representatives
- In office 30 January 1896 – 18 July 1900
- Preceded by: Théophile de Lantsheere
- Succeeded by: Louis Marie Joseph de Sadeleer

Personal details
- Born: 26 July 1829 Ostend, United Kingdom of the Netherlands (now Belgium)
- Died: 6 October 1912 (aged 83) Lucerne, Switzerland
- Party: Catholic Party
- Education: Catholic University of Leuven; Heidelberg University

Auguste Marie François Beernaert (26 July 1829 – 6 October 1912) was the prime minister of Belgium from October 1884 to March 1894, and the 1909 Nobel Peace Prize laureate.

== Life ==
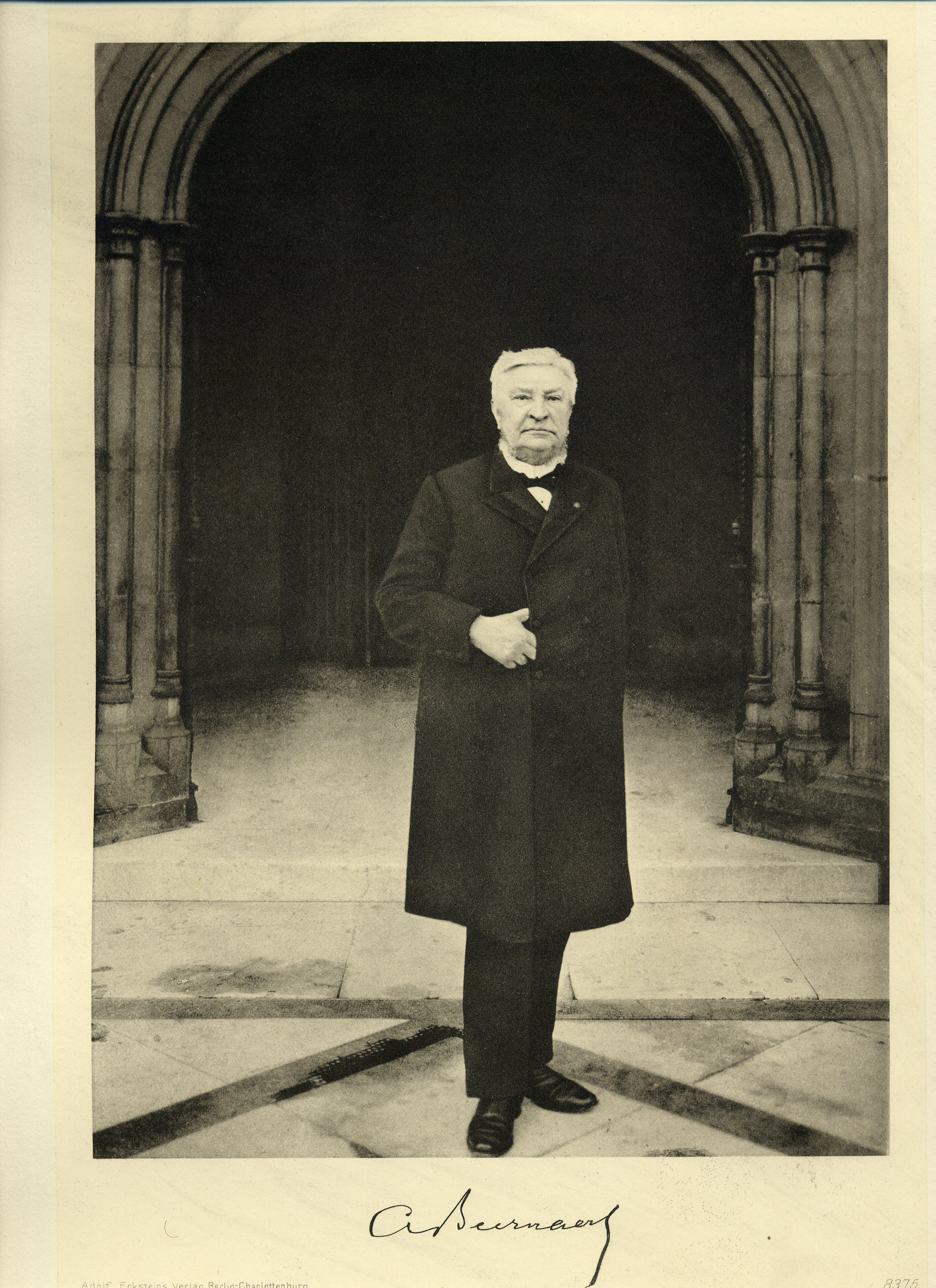
Beernaert, c. 1900

Born in Ostend in the United Kingdom of the Netherlands 1829, he entered the Faculty of Law at the Catholic University of Leuven at age 17. He finished five years later with greatest distinction.

He was elected to the Chamber of Deputies in 1873, and became minister of public works under Jules Malou, greatly improving the rail, canal and road systems. After his tenure as prime minister, he represented Belgium at the Hague conventions of 1899 and 1907, presiding at the Hague Peace Conference of 1907. He was also co-winner (with Paul d'Estournelles de Constant) of the Nobel Peace Prize in 1909 for his work at the Permanent Court of Arbitration. He was chosen as president of the panel established under the rules of that organization in the Sarvarkar Case in 1911. A year later, he died in Lucerne, Switzerland. A lawyer by profession, he served as minister of public works. He served as prime minister and minister of finance from 1884 to 1894. He held the post of president of the international law of association from 1903 to 1905. He was Belgium's first representative to the Hague peace conferences in 1899 and 1907. In the year 1912 he was hospitalised in Lucerne, where he died of pneumonia.

== Achievements ==
He was the primary force behind proposals to unify international maritime law. A number of conventions dealing with collision and assistance at sea drawn up in 1910 were soon signed by many nations.

Political offices
Preceded by Jules Malou	Prime Minister of Belgium; 1884–1894	Succeeded by Jules de Burlet
Preceded by Théophile de Lantsheere	President of the Chamber of Representatives; 1896–1900	Succeeded by Louis Marie Joseph de Sadeleer
