= List of magazines in Belgium =

The following is a list of Belgian magazines which are published in French, in Dutch and in other languages.

== 0 ==
- 24h01

== A ==
- A Prior Magazine
- À Suivre
- L’Art libre
- L'Art Moderne

== B ==
- Belgian Boutique
- La Belgique Horticole
- Boer en Tuinder
- The Bulletin
- The Brussels Times

== C ==
- Ciné Télé Revue
- Le Congo illustré
- The Courier (ACP-EU)

== Ç ==
- Ça Ira

== D ==
- Dag Allemaal
- De Bond
- Durendal
- DW B

== E ==
- E!Sharp
- Elle België
- Elle Belgique
- Elle á Table Belgique
- Elle Eten België
- Elle Décoration België
- Elle Décoration Belgique

== F ==
- Femmes d’Aujourd’hui
- Fire
- Flair
- Flore des Serres et des Jardins de l'Europe
- Forbes België
- Forbes Belgique

== G ==
- Gael
- Green European Journal
- Gonzo
- Le Guide musical

== H ==
- Het Overzicht
- Het Rijk der Vrouw
- HUMO

== I ==
- L'Illustration Européenne

== J ==
- La Jeune Belgique
- Joepie

== K ==
- Kerk en Leven
- Knack

== L ==
- La Lettre b
- Libelle
- L'Officiel België
- L'Officiel Belgique
- L'Officiel Hommes België
- L'Officiel Hommes Belgique
- Lumière

== M ==
- Le Magasin littéraire et scientifique
- Marie Claire België
- Marie Claire Belgique
- Modes & Travaux Belgique
- Mondiaal Nieuws
- Médor
- Mon Copain
- Le Moniteur Belge
- More
- Moustique
- Le Mouvement Géographique (1884–1922)

== N ==
- Nest
- Nieuwsblad

== O ==
- Ons Volkske

== P ==
- P-Magazine
- Paris Match Belgique
- The Parliament Magazine
- Le Petit Vingtième
- Plus Magazine
- Pourquoi pas ?
- Processing and Control News Europe

== R ==
- Radio
- Recherches husserliennes
- Rekto:verso
- Revue de Bruxelles
- Revue catholique des idées et des faits
- Rond den Heerd

== S ==
- Secret
- Snoecks
- Le Soir
- Spirou
- Story
- Suske en Wiske Weekblad

== T ==
- 't Pallieterke
- Technische Revue
- TeKoS
- Ter Zake
- Le Timbre-Poste
- Tintin
- Together
- Touring
- Trends

== V ==
- Van Nu en Straks
- Victoire
- Le Vif/L’Express
- Vitaya
- Vlaanderen

== W ==
- Wonder en is gheen Wonder
- World Aviation
- Wilfried

== Z ==
- Zeste
- Zondag Nieuws
- Zonneland
