= IEN =

IEN or ien or variation, may refer to:

== People ==
- Marci Ien (born 1969), Canadian politician
- Ien Ang (born 1954), Australian professor
- Ien Chi (born 1991), Korean-American filmmaker
- Ien Dales (1931–1994), Dutch politician
- Ien van den Heuvel (1927–2010), Dutch politician
- Ien Lucas (born 1955), Dutch artist

== Organizations ==
- Indigenous Environmental Network
- Irish Environmental Network

== Publications ==
- Internet Experiment Note
- Industrial Engineering News group of magazines
  - Industrial Engineering News Europe
  - Industrial Engineering News Italia

== Other uses ==
- Pine Ridge Airport, Pine Ridge, South Dakota, US, by FAA LID

== See also ==
- Iens, Friesland, Netherlands
- Ian (disambiguation)
- Ion (disambiguation)
