= Gael (magazine) =

Belgian monthly magazine

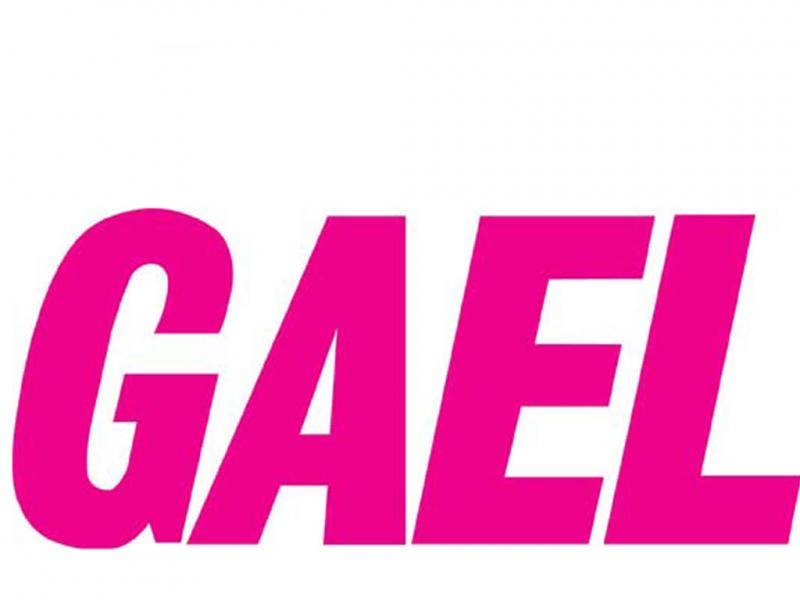
- Editor-in-chief: Anne-Sophie Kersten
- Categories: Women's magazine; Lifestyle magazine
- Frequency: Monthly
- Founded: 1988; 37 years ago
- Company: Roularta
- Country: Belgium
- Based in: Mechelen
- Language: French
- Website: Gael

Gael is a French language monthly women's and lifestyle magazine published monthly in Mechelen, Belgium. It has been in circulation since 1988.

== History and profile ==
Gael was started in 1988. The magazine was part of Sanoma and was published by Sanoma Magazines Belgium, a subsidiary of the company, on a monthly basis. It was acquired by the Roularta media company in June 2018 along with other women's magazines, including Libelle and Femmes d'Aujourd'hui.

Gael has its headquarters in Mechelen. The former headquarters of the magazine was in Brussels.

Its target audience includes women aged 25 to 44. The monthly focuses on fashion- and beauty-related news as well as features articles on a wide range of topics, including travel, health, society, food and culture. The magazine offers a 24-page regional section, which provides region-specific news. It has a special fashion supplement published twice per year.

As of 2015 Anne-Sophie Kersten was the editor-in-chief of Gael.

The circulation of Gael was 75,000 copies in the period 2006-2007. It was 32,467 copies in 2012. The magazine sold 22,726 copies in 2014.

== See also ==
- List of magazines in Belgium
