= Radio (disambiguation) =

Radio is a technology of using radio waves for communication.

Radio is also commonly used to refer to:

- Radio broadcasting
- Radio receiver

Radio may also refer to:

== Companies ==
- Radio Corporation of America
- Radio-Keith-Orpheum

== Films ==
- Radio (2003 film), an American film about James "Radio" Kennedy starring Ed Harris and Cuba Gooding, Jr.
- Radio (2009 film), a Hindi-language Indian film
- Radio (2013 film), a Malayalam-language Indian film
- Radio (2023 film), a Bangladeshi film

== Music ==
=== Albums ===
- Radio (Ky-Mani Marley album), 2007
- Radio (LL Cool J album), 1985
- Radio (Michael Rother album), 1993
- Radio (Naked City album), 1993
- Radio (Steep Canyon Rangers album) or the title song, 2015
- Radio (Wise Guys album) or the title song, 2006
- Radio, or the title song, by Chuck Brodsky, 1998

=== Songs ===
- "Radio" (Alesha Dixon song), 2010
- "Radio" (Beyoncé song), 2008
- "Radio" (Cir.Cuz song), 2011
- "Radio" (The Corrs song), 1999
- "Radio" (Danny Saucedo song), 2008
- "Radio" (Darius Rucker song), 2013
- "Radio" (Musiq Soulchild song), 2008
- "Radio" (Rammstein song), 2019
- "Radio" (Robbie Williams song), 2004
- "Radio" (Future song), 2026
- "The Radio" (Get Far song), 2010
- "The Radio" (Vince Gill song), 1988
- "Radio", by Alkaline Trio from Maybe I'll Catch Fire, 2000
- "Radio", by the Avalanches from Since I Left You, 2000
- "Radio", by Big & Rich from Between Raising Hell and Amazing Grace, 2007
- "Radio", by Busted from Half Way There, 2019
- "Radio", by Client from City, 2004
- "Radio", by Christie Front Drive from Christie Front Drive, 1997
- "Radio", by Eazy-E from Eazy-Duz-It, 1988
- "Radio", by Ed Sheeran from No. 5 Collaborations Project, 2011
- "Radio", by Frost Children featuring Kim Petras from Sister, 2025
- "Radio", by Henry from Journey, 2020
- "Radio", by Hot Chelle Rae from Whatever, 2011
- "Radio", by Jamiroquai from High Times: Singles 1992–2006, 2006
- "Radio", by Lana Del Rey from Born to Die, 2012
- "Radio", by Laura White, an outtake from What My Mother Taught Me, 2013
- "Radio", by Matchbox Twenty from North, 2012
- "Radio", by The Members from Uprhythm, Downbeat, 1982
- "Radio", by Merrill Nisker from Fancypants Hoodlum, 1995
- "Radio", by Rancid from Let's Go, 1994
- "Radio", by Saves the Day from Under the Boards, 2007
- "Radio", by Shakin' Stevens from The Epic Years, 1992
- "Radio", by Smash Mouth from Astro Lounge, 1999
- "Radio", by Sylvan Esso from What Now, 2017
- "Radio", by Teenage Fanclub from Thirteen, 1993
- "Radio", by Watt White from WWE The Music: A New Day, Vol. 10, 2010
- "Radio", by Yelawolf from Radioactive, 2011
- "Radio (Something to Believe)", by Mest from Not What You Expected, 2013
- "Radio I" and "Radio II", by King Crimson from Thrak

=== Other uses ===
- Radio Magazine, electronics technology magazine in China
- Radio (magazine), a radio broadcasting trade publication
- Radio (Belgium), amateur radio magazine
- Radio (play), a 2006 play by Al Smith
- Radio button, a graphical control element

== See also ==
- History of radio
- Outline of radio
- On the Radio (disambiguation)
- Radio.com
- Radioville, Indiana, an unincorporated community in Indiana, United States
- Radiowo, a neighbourhood of Warsaw, Poland
- Rdio, a defunct music streaming service
