= Libelle (Belgian magazine) =

Flemish lifestyle and women's magazine

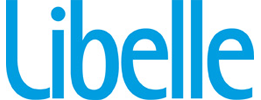
- Categories: Women's magazine; Lifestyle magazine
- Frequency: Weekly
- Founded: 1938; 87 years ago
- Company: Roularta Media Group
- Country: Belgium
- Based in: Mechelen
- Language: Dutch
- Website: Libelle

Libelle (Dutch: Dragonfly) is a Flemish weekly lifestyle and women's magazine based in Mechelen, Belgium. The magazine is the spin-off the magazine with the same name, Libelle, published in the Netherlands.

== History and profile ==
Libelle was started as a spin-off of the Dutch magazine with the same name in 1938. The parent brand of Libelle is published in the Netherlands. Each magazine has an independent editorial board.

Mediaxis sold both Libelle and its sister publication Femmes d'Aujourd'hui to the Finnish media company Sanoma in 2001. Then Libelle was published by Sanoma Magazines Belgium on a weekly basis. The Roularta Media Group acquired Libelle, Femmes d'Aujourd'hui and other women's title Gael in June 2018.

Libelle was the first Flemish women's magazine. It was also the first Belgian women's magazine, which did not heavily cover romantic serial novels. The publication of the magazine stopped during World War II, and it was relaunched as a weekly in November 1945. Libelle offers articles about home, recipes and fashion. The magazine had its headquarters in Antwerp before moving to Mechelen.

In 1970 Libelle merged with another Flemish women's magazine, Rosita. The magazine has had a conservative stance since then. In 1990 it merged with another magazine, Het Rijk der Vrouw. Libelle has its own clothing collection which is sold in cooperating stores. In 2004 the website of the magazine was started.

Libelle is the recipient of the 2003 Zorra Public Award for its woman-friendly commercial. The magazine also awarded the 2004 silver EFFIE prize.

== Circulation ==
In 2000 Libelle sold 214,700 copies. During the period of 2006-2007 it was the best-selling women's magazine in Belgium selling 267,000 copies. The circulation of the magazine was 226,161 copies in 2010 and 223,476 copies in 2011. It fell to 214,333 copies in 2012 and to 212,251 copies in 2013.

== See also ==
- List of magazines in Belgium
