= Armi =

Armi or ARMI may refer to:

- Armi (Syria), an unlocated ancient Syrian kingdom or city
- Fire (magazine), a Belgian-Francophone magazine that publish articles about firearms and militaria
- Armi Jager, an Italian firearms manufacturer
- Imperial Aramaic script, with ISO 15924 code Armi, 124
- Advanced Regenerative Manufacturing Institute, a Manufacturing USA research institute

== People with the name ==
- Armi Aavikko, Finnish singer
- Armi Kuusela, Finnish model
- Armi Ratia, founder of Marimekko
- Armi Toivanen, Finnish actress
- Frank Armi, American race car driver
