= TIMGlobal Media =

- Status: Active
- Founded: 1975; 50 years ago
- Country of origin: Belgium
- Headquarters location: Uccle, Belgium
- Publication types: Magazines, Websites
- Official website: www.tim-europe.com

TIMGlobal Media, formerly Thomas Industrial Media, is a Belgium publishing company that provides tailored editorial services, advertising, and marketing through a number of print magazines, digital media, and events in European. It was founded in 1975 and is headquarters in Uccle, Belgium.

It is a sister company of the American Thomas Publishing Company, which was founded in New York in 1898 and produced the first Thomas Register of American Manufacturers in 1902.

== Publications ==
=== International ===
- IEN Europe (Industrial Engineering News Europe, 1975) Provides industrial designers and manufacturing executives with general industrial engineering news and solutions.
- PCN Europe (Processing and Control News Europe, 2004) Covers industry news, application stories and product news from and for the processing world, including the chemical and pharmaceutical, food and beverage, oil and gas, as well as the rubber and the plastic industries.
- Energy Efficiency: business & industry (2011) Established at the European Commission, is set up to promote business dialogue and better industrial energy efficiency policy.
- icatalogs (2011) An online showcase of industrial catalogs from suppliers located internationally.

=== Country specific ===
- IEN D-A-CH, (1982 - first published as Technische Revue) - Product news and solutions for the manufacturing industries of German-speaking Europe.
- IEN Italia - (Industrial Engineering News Italia, 1999) Interviews, application stories, industry news, market research abstracts and product news for Italian-speaking industrial designers and manufacturing executives.
- Il Distributore Industriale - Targeted to key management in the distribution field, and provides a marketing perspective of relations between production and distribution as well as suggestions of industrial strategies in the Italian distribution market.
- Costruzione e Manutenzione Impianti - Components, machinery and services for design, construction and maintenance of facilities.
- Manutenzione Tecnica e Management - The official technical journal of the Italian Maintenance Association (A.I.MAN). It covers the Maintenance, Repair, Processing and MRO markets in Italy.
- PEI France (Produits Equipements Industriels, 1989) Provides a summary of the latest product and technological developments that are available to the French market.
- Electronique Composants & Instrumentation - for design engineers, design management, procurement and decision-makers in the French electronics industry.
- Endüstri Dünyası (2007) - Product news and solutions for the Turkish market.
