= Vlaanderen (disambiguation) =

Vlaanderen is the Dutch-language name for the region of Flanders, which consists of the northern half of Belgium.

Vlaanderen may also refer to:

- Bert van Vlaanderen (born 1964), Dutch long-distance runner
- Calvin Vlaanderen (born 1996), South African-born Dutch Motocross racer
- Vlaanderen (periodical), Dutch-language periodical
- .vlaanderen, generic top-level domain
