= On My Radio =

On My Radio may refer to:

- "On My Radio" (song), a 1979 single by The Selecter
- OnMyRadio, a 2008 album by Musiq Soulchild

== See also ==
- On the Radio (disambiguation)
