= Industrial Engineering News Italia =

Italian magazine for industry professionals

IEN Italia (Industrial Engineering News) is an Italian magazine launched in 1999 for industry professionals. It is published by the Italian office of Thomas Industrial Media BVBA whose offices are located in Mechelen, Belgium.

== Informations ==
10 times a year, IEN Italia provides a digest of the latest products news and technologies available on the Italian market. In 2009, nearly 14 000 subscribers received IEN Italia, mostly engineers and purchasing managers. IEN Italia also publishes newsletters and updates its website with daily news about new products and services available to the Italian market.

IEN Italia is published in Super A4 format since 2009, in a new style and with an enriched content. It covers articles on latest technologies, interviews and views from market leaders, application stories as well as industry news.

The headquarters of the publication is located in Milan, Italy.

Thomas Industrial media BVBA is also present in France, Germany and Turkey. Thomas Industrial media BVBA publishes as well other industrial publications and websites across Europe.

In English and distributed all across Europe:

- Industrial Engineering News Europe (IEN)
- Processing and Control News Europe (PCN)
- Power In Motion (PIM)

In French and distributed in France:

- Produits Equipements Industriels (PEI)

In German and distributed in Germany:

- Technische Revue (TR)

In Italian and distributed in Italy:

- Manutenzione Tecnica e Management
- Il Distributore Industriale

In Turkish and distributed in Turkey:

- Endustri Dunyasi

== Circulation ==
The magazine is free and available only on request for industry professionals. Over 13 000 copies are distributed ten times a year.

== See also ==
List of magazines published in Italy
