= Ciné Télé Revue =

Weekly television listings periodical in Belgium

- Editor-in-chief: Ingrid Fallay
- Categories: Television magazine
- Frequency: Weekly
- Publisher: Editions Ciné Revue
- Founder: Jean Leempoel
- First issue: 13 October 1944; 80 years ago
- Country: Belgium
- Based in: Brussels
- Language: French
- Website: Ciné Télé Revue

Ciné Télé Revue is a weekly television magazine published in Brussels, Belgium. The magazine has been in circulation since 1944.

== History and profile ==
The magazine was first published on 13 October 1944 under the name Théâtra Ciné Revue. The founder was Jean Leempoel, and Joe van Cottom was the first editor-in-chief. The magazine is published on a weekly basis and has its headquarters in Brussels. The original focus of the magazine was the American movies and film stars. In 1984 the magazine switched its name to the current one, Ciné Télé Revue, and began to focus on television programs.

Ciné Télé Revue is published by Editions Ciné Revue. The weekly provides news on celebrities and TV programs as well as articles on health, environment, culture and tourism. The latter topics were added in the 1990s. The weekly launched its online version in 2000, being the first Belgian magazine to have a website. Ingrid Fallay is the editor-in-chief of the magazine, which is also published in France.

== Circulation ==
Ciné Télé Revue had a circulation of 342,413 copies in 2010. It was the best-selling French-language magazine in Belgium with a circulation of 304,677 copies in 2011. The magazine sold 282,748 copies in 2012. The circulation of the magazine was 272,084 copies between the third quarter of 2012 and the second quarter of 2013. Its circulation was 231,134 copies in 2014.

== See also ==
- List of magazines in Belgium
