= Le Congo illustré =

Belgian magazine

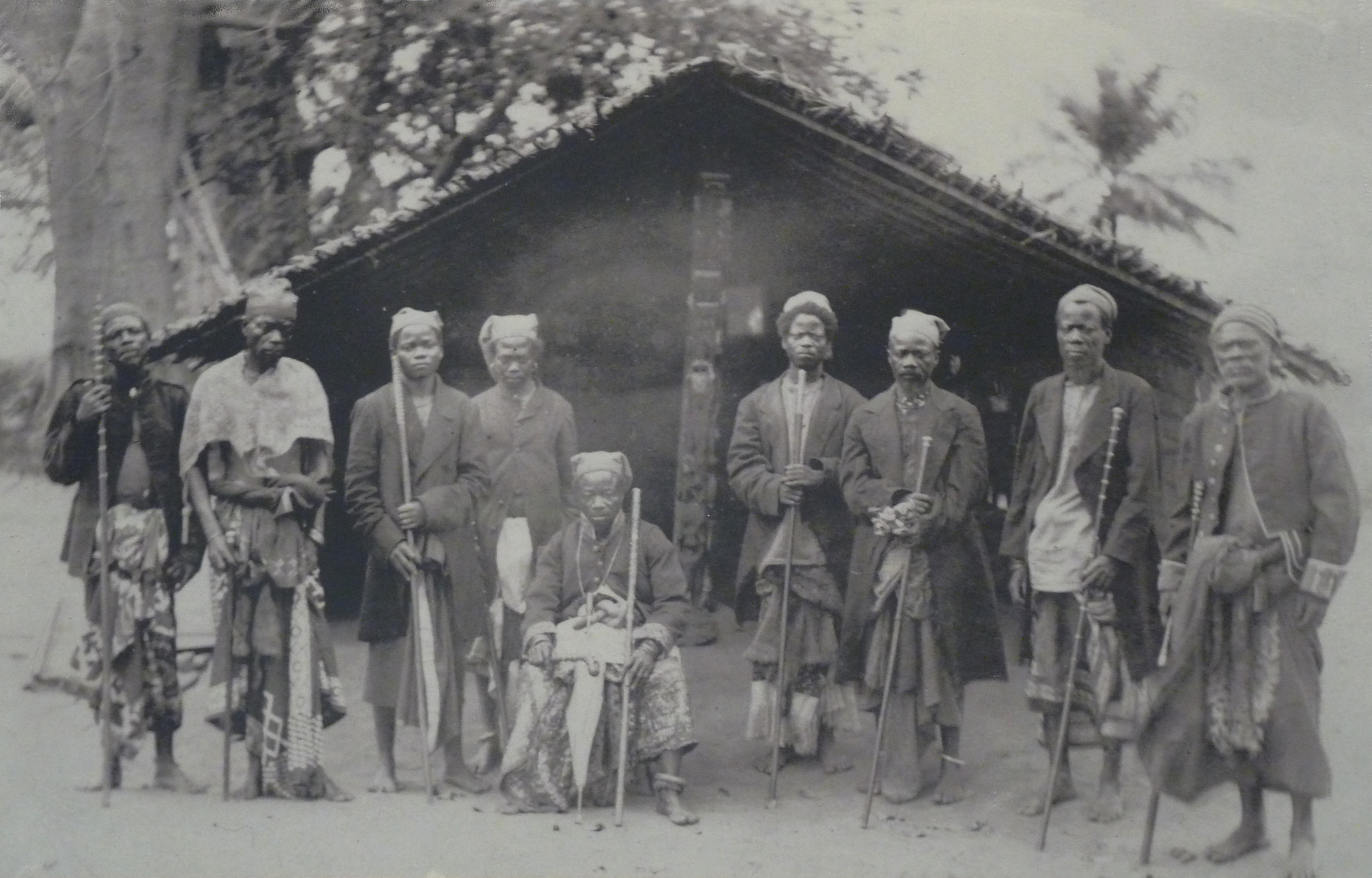
A photograph by Herzekiah Andrew Shanu published in Le Congo illustré 1/19 (1892)

Le Congo illustré (French; "The Congo Illustrated") was a fortnightly illustrated periodical, published in Brussels by Alphonse-Jules Wauters from December 1891 to December 1895. The magazine was dedicated to Belgian exploration and economic development in the Congo Free State with a focus on geography, ethnography and civil engineering. In 1896 Le Congo illustré was folded into Le Mouvement Géographique, a journal also edited by Wauters.

== See also ==
- List of magazines in Belgium
