= Trends (Belgian magazine) =

Belgian business and finance magazine

- Categories: Business magazine
- Frequency: Weekly
- Circulation: 44,351 (2013)
- Publisher: Roularta Printing
- Founded: 1975; 51 years ago
- Company: Roularta Media Group
- Country: Belgium
- Based in: Brussels
- Language: Dutch
- Website: Trends

Trends is a weekly Dutch language business and finance magazine published in Brussels, Belgium. It is the only business and finance magazine in the country.

== History and profile ==
Trends was established in 1975. The magazine is owned by Roularta Media Group and is published weekly by Roularta Printing company. In its initial phase the magazine was published on a biweekly basis. It offers business news and targets business executives, managers, entrepreneurs and professionals.

The headquarters of Trends is in Brussels. The magazine publishes a list, Trends Manager of the Year, in the fields of economy, politics and finance each year. The magazine has two main supplements, MoneyTalk and Trends Style. The latter began to be published separately in 2010 in addition to being a supplement of Trends.

== Circulation ==
Trends had a circulation of 42,658 copies in 1998 and 43,775 copies in 1999. The circulation of the weekly was 37,270 copies in 2010 and 37,113 copies in 2011. It was 37,764 copies in 2012. The magazine had a circulation of 44,351 copies in 2013.

== See also ==
- List of magazines in Belgium
