= Mieux Vivre Votre Argent =

French business magazine

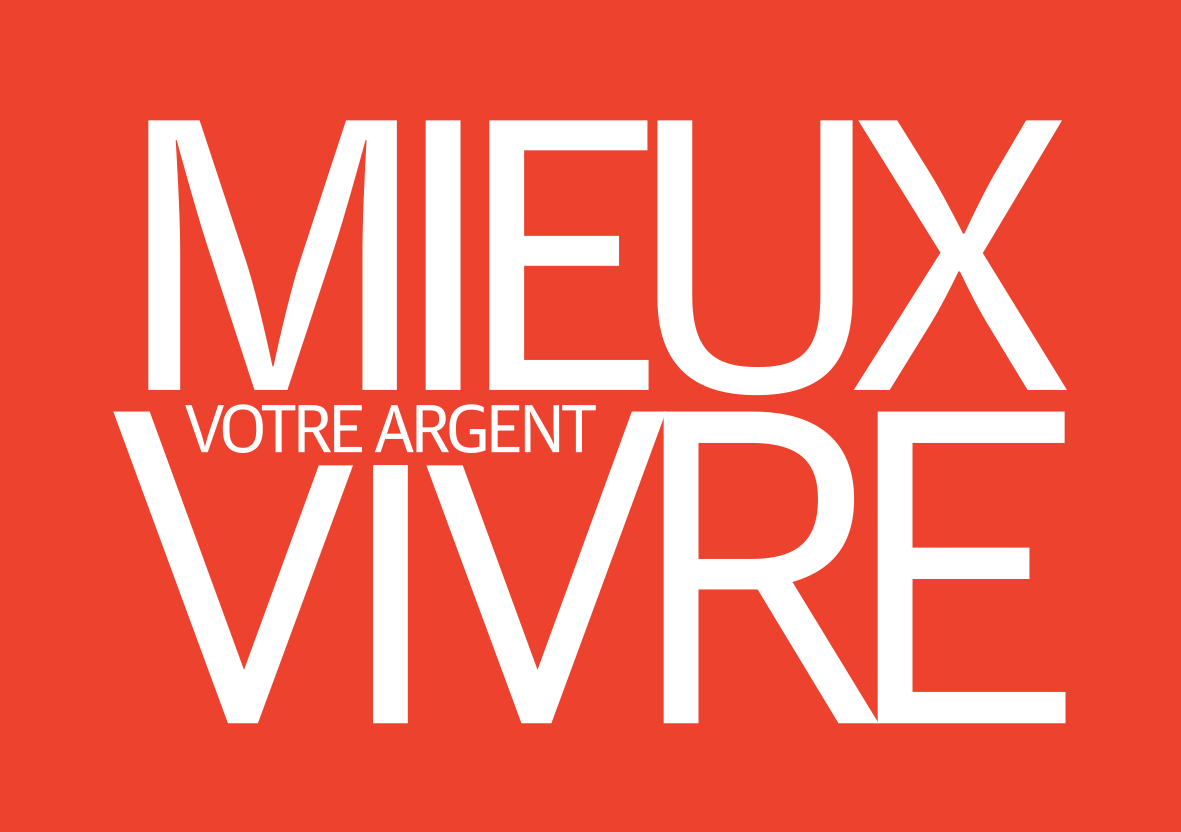
- Categories: Business magazine
- Frequency: Monthly
- Circulation: 128,732 (2019)
- Founded: 1968
- Country: France
- Based in: Paris
- Language: French
- Website: Mieux Vivre Votre Argent
- ISSN: 1291-2549
- OCLC: 433681224

Mieux Vivre Votre Argent (also known as MVVA) is a monthly business magazine published in Paris, France. It has been in circulation since 1968.

== History and profile ==
MVVA was founded in 1968. The magazine had been published by Hachette Filipacchi until 2001 when it began to be published by Quebecor World Inc. It is part of the Mieux Vivre group which was a subsidiary of the Groupe Express Roularta, a joint company of the French media company, Express Group and the Belgian media company, Roularta Media Group. The magazine was published by the Groupe Express Roularta on a monthly basis. At the beginning of 2015 the magazine was acquired by French businessman Patrick Drahi. Roularta also sold most of its magazines published in France to Drahi.

MVVA has its headquarters in Paris. The magazine covers articles concerned with the management of personal financial asset. The magazine also features articles about investment, savings taxes, pensions and inheritance. All these topics are offered in five sections of the monthly.

== Circulation ==
In 2001 MVVA was the twenty-third best-selling business magazine worldwide with a circulation of 265,000 copies. The circulation of the magazine was 252,917 during the last quarter of 2007.

The magazine had a circulation of 238,555 copies in 2010. Its circulation was 185,361 copies in 2014. In 2019 MVVA sold 128,732 copies.
