= Processing and Control News Europe =

PCN Europe is a compendium published six times a year of news concerning products and technologies available in the European market. In 2009, it boasted nearly 40,000 subscribers, predominantly engineers and purchasing managers. A newsletter and website accompany the magazine, offering daily updates on new products and services.

Thomas Industrial Media BVBA launched PCN Europe (Processing and Control News) in 2004 for industry professionals.

IEN (Industrial Engineering News) Europe, published by Thomas Industrial Media BVBA, serves a similar purpose. This publication encompasses articles on the latest technologies, interviews with industry leaders, application stories, and industry news.

The headquarters of these publications sit in Mechelen, Belgium.

Thomas Industrial Media BVBA extends its presence beyond Belgium into France, Italy, Germany, and Turkey. The company also publishes various other industrial publications and maintains websites across Europe.

In English and distributed across Europe:

- Industrial Engineering News Europe (IEN)
- Power In Motion (PIM)

In French and distributed in France:

- Produits Equipements Industriels (PEI)

In German and distributed in Germany:

- Technische Revue (TR)

In Italian and distributed in Italy:

- Industrial Engineering News Italia (IEN Italia)
- Manutenzione Tecnica e Management
- Il Distributore Industriale

In Turkish and distributed in Turkey:

- Endustri Dunyasi

== Circulation ==
PCN Europe has a circulation of 40,000 copies, six times a year. Subscription is free to industry professionals but it is only available upon request.
