= Real estate =

Land, including its buildings and resources

Real estate is a property consisting of land and the buildings on it, along with its natural resources such as growing crops, minerals or water, and wild animals; immovable property of this nature is real property or housing in general. In terms of law, real relates to land property and is different from personal property, while estate means the "interest" a person has in that land property.

Real estate is different from personal property, which is not permanently attached to the land (or comes with the land), such as vehicles, boats, jewelry, furniture, tools, and the rolling stock of a farm and farm animals.

The term real estate includes any land and buildings under private ownership, public (state) ownership or commercial (business) ownership.

The purpose or usage of the real estate in question may differ from its ownership status. The property may be for residential or commercial use, used by the state, government or the general public. One example where ownership and purpose might differ would be an apartment block that is owned by a business but intended for residential use.

In the United States, the transfer, ownership, or acquisition of real estate can be done by business corporations, individuals, nonprofit corporations, fiduciaries, or any legal entity as seen within the law of each U.S. state.

== History of real estate ==
The natural right of a person to own property as a concept can be seen as having roots in Roman law as well as Greek philosophy. The profession of appraisal can be seen as beginning in England during the 1500s, as agricultural needs required land clearing and land preparation. Textbooks on the subject of surveying began to be written and the term "surveying" was used in England, while the term "appraising" was more commonly used in North America. Natural law which can be seen as "universal law" was discussed among writers of the 15th and 16th centuries as it pertained to "property theory" and the inter-state relations dealing with foreign investments and the protection of citizens' private property abroad. Natural law can be seen as having an influence in Emerich de Vattel's 1758 treatise The Law of Nations which conceptualized the idea of private property.

One of the largest initial real estate deals in history known as the "Louisiana Purchase" happened in 1803 when the Louisiana Purchase Treaty was signed. This treaty paved the way for western expansion and made the U.S. the owners of the "Louisiana Territory" as the land was bought from France for fifteen million dollars, making each acre roughly 4 cents. The oldest real estate brokerage firm was established in 1855 in Chicago, Illinois, and was initially known as "L. D. Olmsted & Co." but is now known as "Baird & Warner". In 1908, the National Association of Realtors was founded in Chicago and in 1916, the name was changed to the National Association of Real Estate Boards and this was also when the term "realtor" was coined to identify real estate professionals.

The stock market crash of 1929 and the Great Depression in the U.S. caused a major drop in real estate value and prices and ultimately resulted in a depreciation of 50% for the four years after 1929. Housing financing in the U.S. was greatly affected by the Banking Act of 1933 and the National Housing Act in 1934 because it allowed for mortgage insurance for home buyers and this system was implemented by the Federal Deposit Insurance as well as the Federal Housing Administration. In 1938, an amendment was made to the National Housing Act and Fannie Mae, a government agency, was established to serve as a secondary market for mortgages and to give lenders more money in order for new homes to be funded.

Title VIII of the Civil Rights Act in the U.S., which is also known as the Fair Housing Act, was put into place in 1968 and dealt with the incorporation of African Americans into neighborhoods as the issues of discrimination were analyzed with the renting, buying, and financing of homes. Internet real estate as a concept began with the first appearance of real estate platforms on the World Wide Web (www) and occurred in 1999.

== Residential real estate ==
Residential real estate may contain either a single-family or multifamily structure that is available for occupation or for non-business purposes.

Residences can be classified by how they are connected to neighbouring residences and land. Different types of housing tenure can be used for the same physical type. For example, connected residences might be owned by a single entity and leased out, or owned separately with an agreement covering the relationship between units and common areas and concerns.

According to the Congressional Research Service, in 2021, 65% of homes in the U.S. are owned by the occupier.

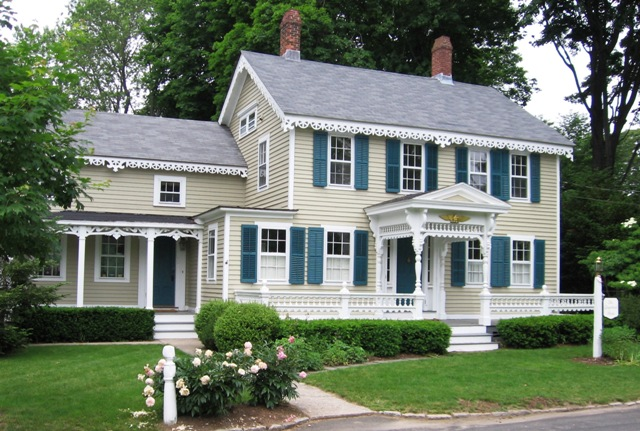
Single-family detached house in Essex, Connecticut, United States

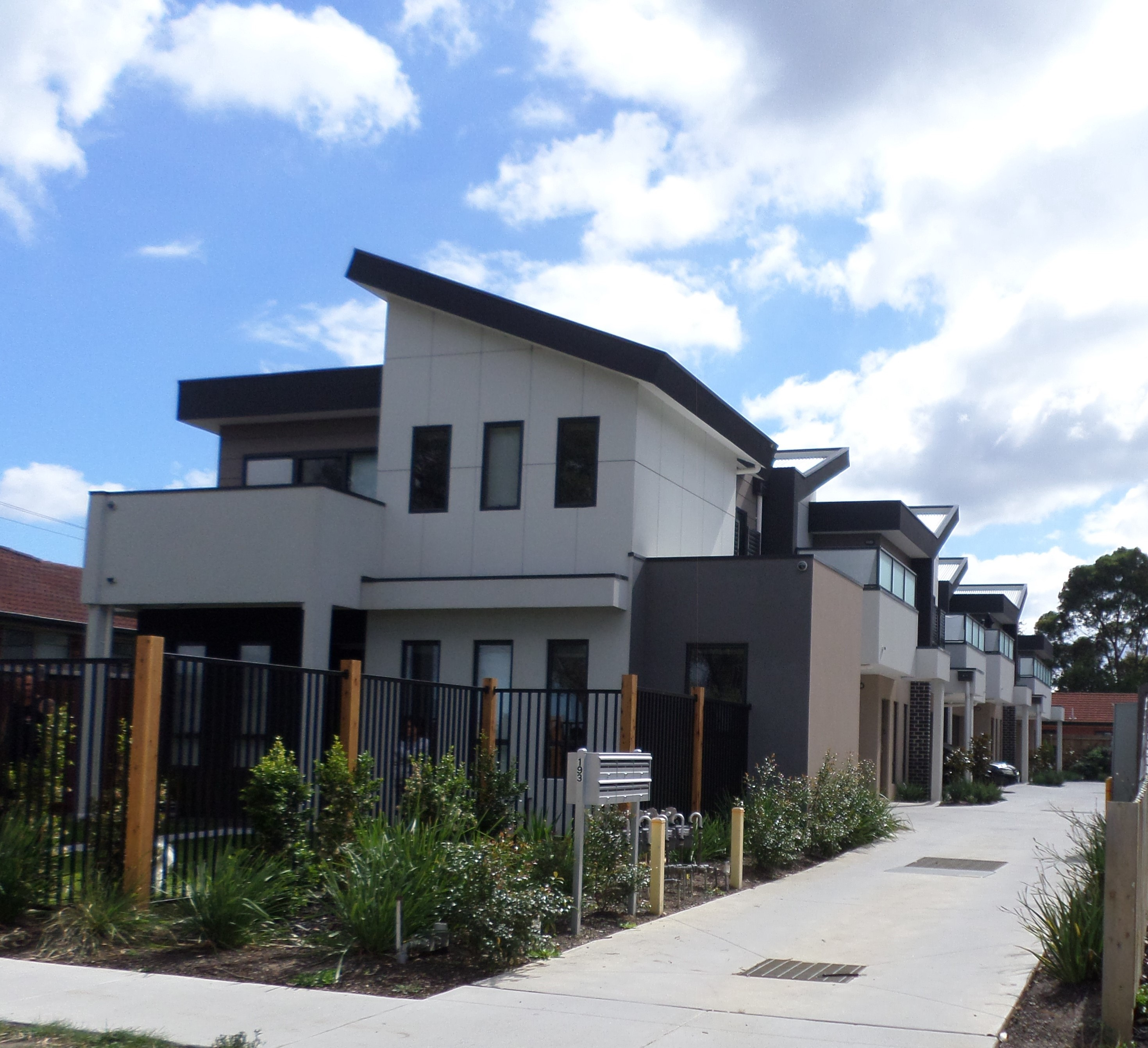
Townhouses in Victoria, Australia

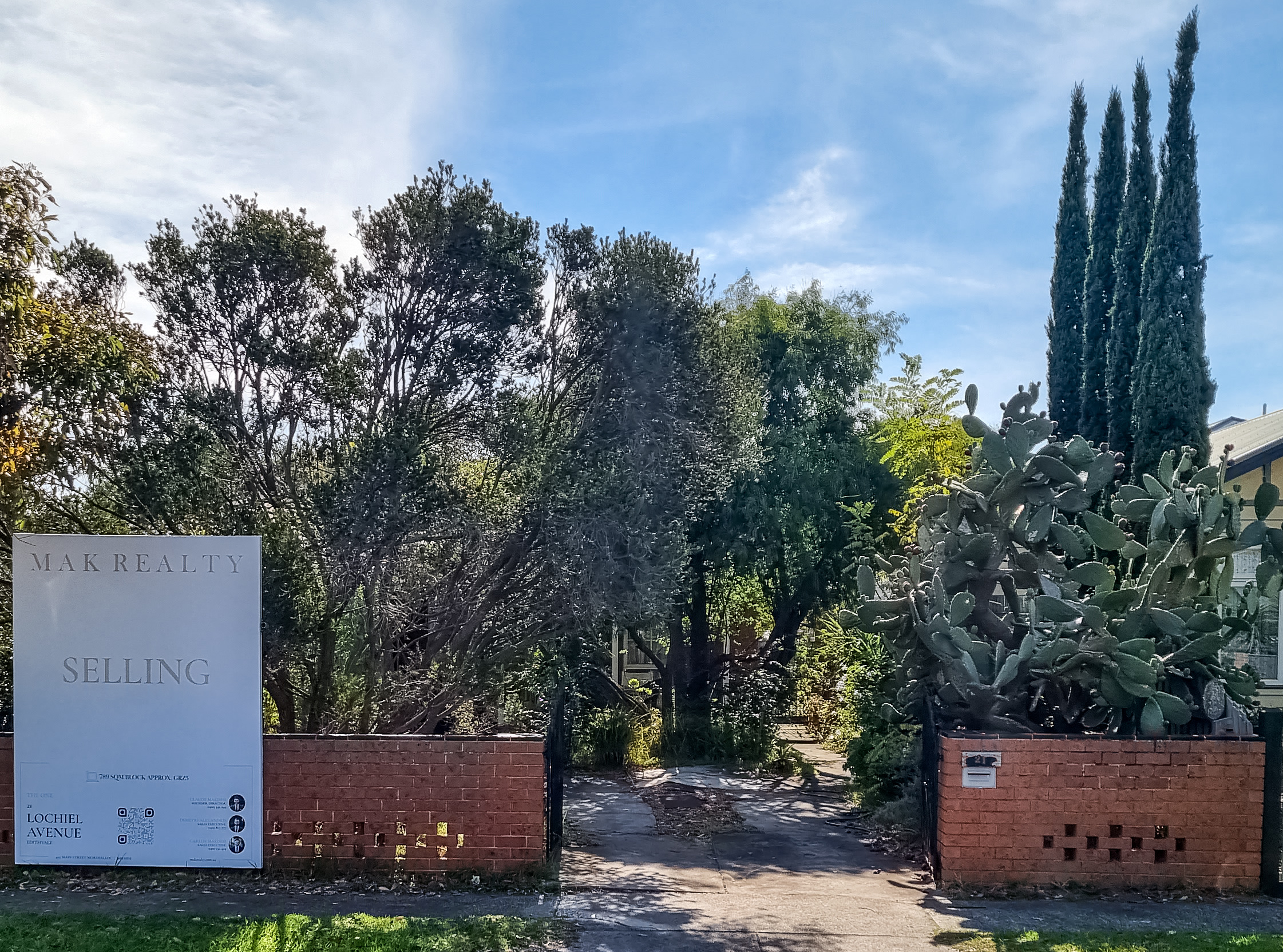
Property for sale in Victoria, Australia

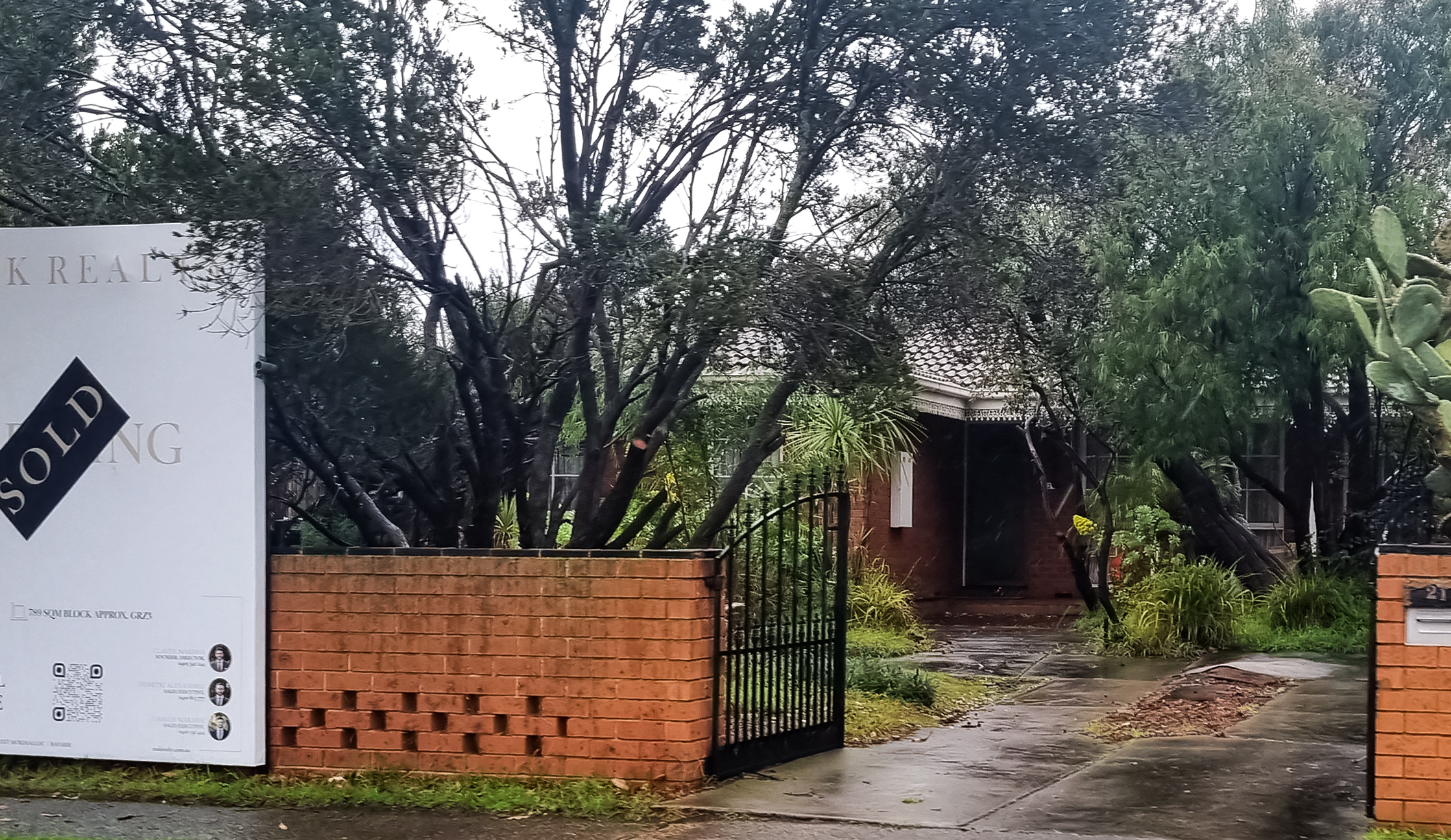
The property in Victoria after it was sold

Major categories

- Attached / multi-unit dwellings
  - Apartment (American English) or Flat (British English) – An individual unit in a multi-unit building. The boundaries of the apartment are generally defined by a perimeter of locked or lockable doors. Often seen in multi-story apartment buildings.
  - Multi-family house – Often seen in multi-story detached buildings, where each floor is a separate apartment or unit.
  - Terraced house (a.k.a. townhouse or rowhouse) – A number of single or multi-unit buildings in a continuous row with shared walls and no intervening space.
  - Condominium (American English) – A building or complex, similar to apartments, owned by individuals. Common grounds and common areas within the complex are owned and shared jointly. In North America, there are townhouse or rowhouse style condominiums as well. The British equivalent is a block of flats.
  - Housing cooperative (a.k.a. co-op) – A type of multiple ownership in which the residents of a multi-unit housing complex own shares in the cooperative corporation that owns the property, giving each resident the right to occupy a specific apartment or unit. Most housing in Indian metro cities is of this type.
  - Tenement – A type of building shared by multiple dwellings, typically with flats or apartments on each floor and with shared entrance stairway access found in Britain.
- Semi-detached dwellings
  - Duplex – Two units with one shared wall.
- Detached dwellings
  - Bungalows
  - Split-level home
  - Mansions
  - Villas
  - Detached house or single-family detached house
  - Cottages
- Portable dwellings
  - Mobile homes, tiny homes, or residential caravans – A full-time residence that can be (although might not in practice be) movable on wheels.
  - Houseboats – A floating home
  - Tents – Usually temporary, with roof and walls consisting only of fabric-like material.

Other categories

- Chawls
- Havelis
- Igloos
- Huts

The size of havelis and chawls is measured in Gaz (square yards), Quila, Marla, Beegha, and acre.

See List of house types for a complete listing of housing types and layouts, real estate trends for shifts in the market, and house or home for more general information.

== Development ==
Real estate development involves planning and coordinating of housebuilding, real estate construction or renovation projects. Real estate development can be less cyclical than real estate investing. The price of real estate increases with demand and decreases with supply according to demand and supply.

== Investment ==
In markets where land and building prices are rising, real estate is often purchased as an investment, whether or not the owner intends to use the property. Often investment properties are rented out, but "flipping" involves quickly reselling a property, sometimes taking advantage of arbitrage or quickly rising value, and sometimes after repairs are made that substantially raise the value of the property. Luxury real estate is sometimes used as a way to store value, especially by wealthy foreigners, without any particular attempt to rent it out. Some luxury units in London and New York City have been used as a way for corrupt foreign government officials and business people from countries without strict rule of law to launder money or to protect it from seizure. Investment in real estate can be categorized by financial risk into core, value-added, and opportunistic. Real estate value tends to depreciate with age according to hedonic regression.

== Real estate and the environment ==
Real estate can be valued or devalued based on the amount of environmental degradation that has occurred. Environmental degradation can cause extreme health and safety risks. There is a growing demand for the use of site assessments (ESAs) when valuing a property for both private and commercial real estate.

Environmental surveying is made possible by environmental surveyors who examine the environmental factors present within the development of real estate as well as the impacts that development and real estate has on the environment.

Green development is a concept that has grown since the 1970s with the environmental movement and the World Commission on Environment and Development. Green development examines social and environmental impacts with real estate and building. There are 3 areas of focus: environmental responsiveness, resource efficiency, and the sensitivity of cultural and societal aspects. Examples of Green development are green infrastructure, LEED, conservation development, and sustainability developments.

Real estate in itself has been measured as a contributing factor to the rise in greenhouse gases. According to the International Energy Agency, real estate in 2019 was responsible for 39 percent of total emissions worldwide and 11 percent of those emissions were due to the manufacturing of materials used in buildings.

== Professionals ==
- Real estate agent – North America
- Estate agent – United Kingdom
- Makler - Germany, Austria.

== See also ==
- Environmental Surveying
- Green Development – Real estate development concept
- Phase I environmental site assessment – Contamination assessment for US real estate, known as 'ESA'
- Commercial real estate – Buildings or land intended to generate a profit
- Housing estate – Group of homes and other buildings built together as a single development
- Estate (land) – Comprises the buildings and supporting farmland and woods of a very large property
- Extraterrestrial real estate – Ownership claims of property on other planets, moons, or parts of outer space
- Fractional financing
- Land lot – Tract or parcel of land that is owned
- Real estate appraisal – Process of developing an opinion of value for real property
- Real estate business – Profession of buying, leasing, managing, or selling real estate
- Real estate economics – Application of economic techniques to real estate markets
- Right to property – Human right to own property
- Imputed Rental Value Tax – Swiss tax on the imputed rental value of owner-occupied properties
