= Le Vif/L'Express =

Belgian weekly news magazine

- Editor-in-chief: Thierry Fiorilli
- Categories: News magazine
- Frequency: Weekly
- Circulation: 76,000 (March 2014)
- Publisher: Roularta Printing
- Founded: 1983; 43 years ago
- Company: Roularta Media Group
- Country: Belgium
- Based in: Brussels
- Language: French
- Website: Le Vif/L'Express
- ISSN: 0774-2711
- OCLC: 1031321905

Le Vif/L'Express is a weekly news magazine published in Brussels, Belgium. It has been in circulation since 1983.

== History and profile ==
The magazine was established under the name of Le Vif in 1983. Its name was changed to Le Vif/L'Express when an agreement was made with the French magazine L'Express. Both magazines have had a cooperation since then and are both owned by Roularta Media Group.

Le Vif/L'Express has its headquarters in Brussels. As of 2010 Thierry Fiorilli was the editor-in-chief of the magazine, which is published weekly on Fridays and offers news on politics, economics, investigations, society and culture in relation to both Belgium and international events. It also covers news on literature and sports. During the period of 2011-2012 55.3% of its readers were men.

Le Vif/L'Express magazine is the equivalent of Flemish weekly news magazine Knack, which is also owned by the Roularta Media Group. Both magazines are published by Roularta Printing, a subsidiary of the Roularta Media Group.

Le Vif/L'Express adopts a neutral political stance. The weekly has several supplements: Focus Vif, a culture publication, Le Vif Weekend, a lifestyle magazine and Vacature Emploi. In 2010 Le Vif/L'Express began to offer T'chin, a health supplement, together with its sister magazine Knack.

== Circulation ==
Le Vif/L'Express sold 82,362 copies in 1998 and 85,772 copies in 1998. The magazine had a circulation of 97,000 copies in the period of 2006–2007. Next year the magazine sold 97,605 copies.

The circulation of the magazine was 72,040 copies in 2010 and 68,781 copies in 2011. It was 65,274 copies in 2012 and 65,689 copies in 2013. In March 2014 its circulation grew to 76,000 copies.

== See also ==
- List of magazines in Belgium
