= Robert Brisart =

Belgian philosopher (1953-2015)

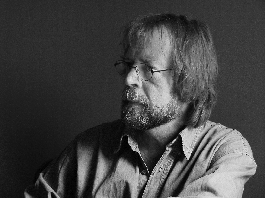
Photo of Belgian philosopher Robert Brisart

Robert Brisart (29 October 1953 – 25 February 2015, in Louvain-la-Neuve), was a Belgian philosopher. He was professor at the University of Luxembourg, and at the Facultés Universitaires Saint-Louis in Brussels. His works mainly focused on Husserl's phenomenology. He also published on the comparison between analytic philosophy and phenomenology.

== Bibliography ==
- SERON D., "Bibliographie de Robert Brisart (1953‐2015)", in Bulletin d'Analyse Phénoménologique, Vol. 15 (2019), 9, pp. 1–5. https://popups.uliege.be/1782-2041/index.php?id=1126.

=== Books ===
- BRISART R. et MAESSCHALCK M. (éd.), Idéalisme et phénoménologie, Hildesheim, Zürich, New York, Georg Olms Vlg, 2007.
- BRISART R. (dir.), Husserl et Frege. Les ambiguïtés de l'antipsychologisme, Paris, Librairie philosophique J. Vrin, coll. "Problèmes et Controverses", 2002.
- BENOIST J, BRISART R., ENGLISH J. (éd.), Liminaires phénoménologiques. Recherches sur le développement de la théorie de la signification de Husserl, Bruxelles, Publications des Facultés Universitaires Saint-Louis, coll. "Philosophie", 1998.
- BRISART R., La phénoménologie de Marbourg ou La résurgence métaphysique chez Heidegger à l'époque de Sein und Zeit, Bruxelles, Publications des Facultés Universitaires Saint-Louis, coll. "Philosophie", 1991.

=== Papers ===
- BRISART R., "L’expérience perceptive et son passif. À propos des sensations dans le constructivisme de Husserl", in Philosophie, n° 119, 2013, pp. 33–63.
- BRISART R., "True objects and Fulfiments under Assumptions in the Young Husserl", in Axiomathes, n° 22, p. 75-89.
- BRISART R., "Husserl et l’affaire des démonstratifs. À propos de la référence en régime noématique", in Revue philosophique de Louvain, n° 2, 2011, pp. 245–269.
- BRISART R., "Husserl et le mythe des objets", in Philosophie n° 111, 2011, pp. 26–51.
- BRISART R., "Husserl et la no ready-made theory : la phénoménologie dans la tradition constructiviste", in Bulletin d'Analyse Phénoménologique, vol. 7, 2011, pp. 3–36. https://popups.uliege.be/1782-2041/index.php?id=487.
- BRISART R., "La théorie des assomptions chez le jeune Husserl", in Philosophiques, vol. 36, n° 2, 2009, pp. 399–425.
- RISART R., "Perception, sens et vérité : la phénoménologie à l’épreuve de l’opacité référentielle", in Topos. To the 150th anniversary of. E. Husserl, n° 2-3 (22), 2009, pp. 33–47.
- BRISART R., "Les premières articulations du fonctionnement intentionnel : le projet d'un Raumbuch chez Husserl entre 1892 et 1894", in Philosophiques, vol. 34, n° 2, 2007, pp. 259–272.
- BRISART R., "Il recupero heideggeriano dell’onto-theologia a Marburgo e la questione della fenomenologica", in Heigegger a Marburgo (1923-1928), Curato da E. Mazzarella, Melangolo, Genova, 2006, pp. 55–72.
- BRISART R., "La théorie de l'objet dans les Recherches logiques de Husserl", in HUSSERL E., La représentation vide suivi de Les Recherches logiques, une oeuvre de percée, J. Benoist et J.-F. Courtine (dir.), Paris, Presses Universitaires de France, coll. "Epiméthée", 2003, pp. 125–139.
- BRISART R., "Das Unreduzierbare in phänomenologischer Hinsicht", in KÜHN R. und STAUDIGL M. (Hrsg.), Formen und praxis der Reduktion in der Phänomenologie, Würzburg, Königshausen & Neumann, 2003, pp. 81–106.
- BRISART R., "Le général et l'abstrait : sur la maturation des Recherches logiques de Husserl", in FISETTE D. et LAPOINTE S., Aux origines de la phénoménologie. Husserl et le contexte des Recherches logiques, Paris, Sainte-Foy, Librairie philosophique J. Vrin, Presses de l'Université Laval, 2003, pp. 21–40.
- BRISART R., "La logique de Husserl à l'épreuve du néokantisme marbourgeois : la Recension de Natorp", in Phänomenologische Forschungen, 2002, pp. 183–204.
- BRISART R., "Le problème de l'abstraction en mathématique : l'écart initial de Husserl par rapport à Frege entre 1891 et 1894", in BRISART R. (éd.), Husserl et Frege. Les ambiguïtés de l'antipsychologisme, Paris, Librairie philosophique J. Vrin, 2002, pp. 13–47.
- BRISART R., "Husserl et Bolzano : le lien sémantique", in Recherches husserliennes, vol. 18, 2002, pp. 3–29.
- BRISART R., "La découverte des processus signitifs dans la première oeuvre mathématique de Husserl (1887-1891), in BENOIST J, BRISART R., ENGLISH J. (éd.), Liminaires phénoménologiques. Le développement de la théorie de la signification chez Husserl, Bruxelles, Publications des Facultés Universitaires Saint-Louis, 1998, pp. 9-62.
- BRISART R., "Le tournant logique de Husserl en 1891. La recension de Schröder et ses antécédents", in Recherches husserliennes, vol. 10, 1998, pp. 3–34.
- BRISART R., "La réduction et l'irréductible phénoménologiques. Husserl critique de Heidegger", in BRISART R. et CELIS R. (éd.), L'évidence du monde et la phénoménologie, Bruxelles, Publications des Facultés Universitaires Saint-Louis, 1993, pp. 139–185.
- BRISART R., "Nature et liberté dans l'ontologie fondamentale de Heidegger. De la radicalisation d'une antinomie moderne à l'acosmisme existential", in Revue philosophique de Louvain, vol. 88, 1990, pp. 524–552.
- BRISART R., "La métaphysique de Heidegger", IJSSELING S. et TAMINIAUX J. (éd.), Heidegger et l'idée de la phénoménologie, Dordrecht, Kluwer, coll. "Phaenomenologica", 1988, pp. 217–238.
- BRISART R., "Remarques sur la conception de la réduction phénoménologique chez Heidegger", in FLORIVAL G. (éd.), Figures de la finitude. Études d’anthropologie philosophique III, Louvain, Bibliothèque philosophique de Louvain, 32, 1988, pp. 33–52.

== See also ==
- Recherches husserliennes
