= Vitaya (magazine) =

Belgian women's magazine

- Categories: Women's magazine; Lifestyle magazine
- Frequency: Monthly
- First issue: 9 May 2001
- Final issue: February 2017
- Company: De Persgroep
- Country: Belgium
- Based in: Mechelen
- Language: Dutch
- ISSN: 2031-9088

Vitaya is a former women's magazine published in Belgium which was founded in 2001. The magazine was owned by De Persgroep. In February 2017, Vitaya was merged with another Persgroep title, Goed Gevoel.

== History and profile ==
The magazine was started in 2001 with the name evita. The first issue appeared on 9 May 2001. The magazine was acquired by Flemish TV network Vitaya in 2008 and it was renamed Vitaya the same year. Later it was sold to Sanoma Media Belgium NV and moved its headquarters from Brussels to Mechelen. Sanoma merged its women's magazine Fit & Gezond, launched in 1992, with Vitaya. In May 2015, De Persgroep, which already owned the TV network by the same name, acquired the magazine. In February 2017, the company merged Vitaya magazine with another of its titles, Goed Gevoel.

Vitaya was published on a monthly basis. The magazine covered topics for women including fashion, lifestyle, cooking, nutrition and health.

== See also ==
- List of magazines in Belgium
