= Mondiaal Nieuws =

News magazine in Belgium

- Categories: News magazine
- Frequency: Monthly
- Publisher: Newsco Publishing
- Founded: 2002
- Country: Belgium
- Based in: Brussels
- Language: Dutch
- Website: Mondiaal Nieuws
- ISSN: 1379-5619

Mondiaal Nieuws, also called MO* - Mondiaal Magazine, (Dutch: Global News) is a Flemish quarterly alternative news magazine with a special focus on globalization. The magazine is published as a supplement of the news magazine Knack in Brussels, Belgium.

== History and profile ==
MO* was established in 2002. It is a quarterly supplement of Knack, a Flemish news magazine. Newsco Publishing, a subsidiary of Roularta Media Group, is the publisher of MO* of which headquarters is in Brussels. The magazine publishes articles on globalization and development, but it focuses on those topics that are not covered by mainstream media outlets.

The website of MO*, launched in 2007, covers articles published in four languages, Dutch, English, Spanish and French.

In 2013 the circulation of MO* was 99,699 copies.

== See also ==
- List of magazines in Belgium
