= Le Mouvement Géographique =

Geographical magazine published in Belgium

Le Mouvement Géographique was a geographical magazine published in Brussels from 1884 to 1922. It was initially edited by Alphonse-Jules Wauters, and primarily promoted and documented Belgian colonisation of Congo. From 1890, it was owned by the Compagnies du Congo pour le Commerce et l'Industrie. Another periodical edited by Wauters, Le Congo illustré, was folded into the Mouvement Géographique in 1896.

== See also ==
- List of magazines in Belgium
