= Imputed rental value tax (Switzerland) =

Swiss tax on the imputed rental value of owner-occupied properties

The imputed rental value tax (German: Eigenmietwert) is a real estate tax under Swiss taxation that applies to property owners based on the imputed rental value of their property since the 1940s.

== Description ==
As of 2024, this tax is levied in a limited number of relatively small countries: Switzerland, Iceland, Luxembourg and the Netherlands. It involves taxing the imputed income from owner-occupied (unrented) real estate as if it were rented. The taxed income is thus fictional, calculated based on the property's imputed rental value, treated as real income despite being hypothetical. This tax is applied in all Swiss cantons.

In return for the tax on this presumed rental income, property owners can claim deductions for maintenance costs and mortgage interest.

The rationale for this tax is based on several principles:

- When an owner occupies large premises not entirely necessary for their needs, they withhold these premises from the rental market for personal comfort. In times of housing shortages, taxing unrented properties encourages owners to rent them out.
- The tax offsets the cost of maintaining the owner's residence.
- It increases the tax burden on wealthy property owners.
- It promotes professional mobility: if an owner must relocate and pay rent elsewhere, they can rent out their property and use the full rental income (without additional tax deductions) to cover their own rent, creating a form of tax neutrality for migrating owners.
- It reduces tax evasion by owners tempted to underreport rental income, as they must pay the tax even without declaring rental activity.

== History ==
The tax was introduced in Switzerland during World War I, later abolished, reintroduced in 1934 as a temporary measure, and made permanent in 1958. It has faced regular criticism from right-wing parties in the Swiss parliament, as well as from various taxpayer groups and landowners' associations.

In 2018, the Commission for Economic Affairs and Taxation proposed abolishing the imputed rental value tax for owner-occupied residences, though it would remain for second homes. In return, deductions for maintenance costs, energy-saving measures, and restoration of historical monuments would be eliminated, though cantons could retain some of these deductions. In September 2021, the Council of States voted to abolish this tax.

== Role of the imputed rental value tax among property taxes ==
In addition to taxes on property transfers (sale, inheritance, donation), including the tax on real estate capital gains, three types of annual taxes affect property ownership:

- Taxes proportional to the tax base: the land tax.
- Progressive taxes based on wealth: the wealth tax in some Swiss cantons, Norway, Spain, and the real estate wealth tax in France.
- Progressive taxes based on income, often called income tax: the imputed rental value tax falls into this category.

== Swiss Referendums on the topic ==
- Popular Initiative "Home Ownership for All" on February 7, 1999 (41.3% yes, 58.7% no).
- Tax Package on May 16, 2004 (65.9% no).
- Popular Initiative "Home Ownership through Housing Savings" on June 17, 2012 (68.9% no).
- Popular Initiative "Secure Housing in Retirement" on September 23, 2012 (52.6% no).
- In June 2023, the Swiss National Council approved the abolition of the imputed rental value tax, with the trade-off that mortgage interest and maintenance costs would no longer be fully deductible.

== Criticism ==
As it taxes a theoretical income, this tax can particularly burden those with low incomes, such as retirees. Determining the precise amount of this income is complex and challenging to implement. The IMF and the OECD have raised concerns about Swiss household debt levels due to this tax, urging reform, particularly as total mortgage debt in 2024 exceeds 150% of Switzerland's CHF 800 billion GDP. The Swiss system thus encourages borrowing rather than repayment.

== Compensation after potential abolition ==
If the imputed rental value tax is abolished, the property tax on second homes could increase to compensate. Maintenance costs would no longer be deductible, and passive interest would only be deductible up to 40% of taxable wealth income.

== Comparison ==
In Belgium the imputed rental value tax is called Cadastral income. In France, the Cadastral rental value is the "theoretical annual rent a built or unbuilt property could generate if rented under normal conditions." It is used to calculate taxes benefiting local authorities: residence tax, Economic territorial contribution (replacing the former "business tax"), and land tax on built or unbuilt properties (e.g., agricultural operations).

== Imputed rental value tax worldwide ==
As of 2024 this tax is levied in a limited number of relatively small countries: Switzerland, Iceland, Luxembourg and the Netherlands.

=== France ===
In France, it was introduced in 1914 and abolished in 1965 to encourage middle-class homeownership.

== See also ==
- Real estate law
