= Knack (magazine) =

Belgian news magazine

- Categories: News magazine
- Frequency: Weekly
- Circulation: 104,542 (2013)
- Publisher: Roularta Printing
- Founded: 1971; 55 years ago
- Company: Roularta Media Group
- Country: Belgium
- Based in: Brussels
- Language: Dutch
- Website: Knack

Knack is a Belgian Dutch-language weekly news magazine covering local news, politics, sports, business, jobs, and community events.

== History and profile ==
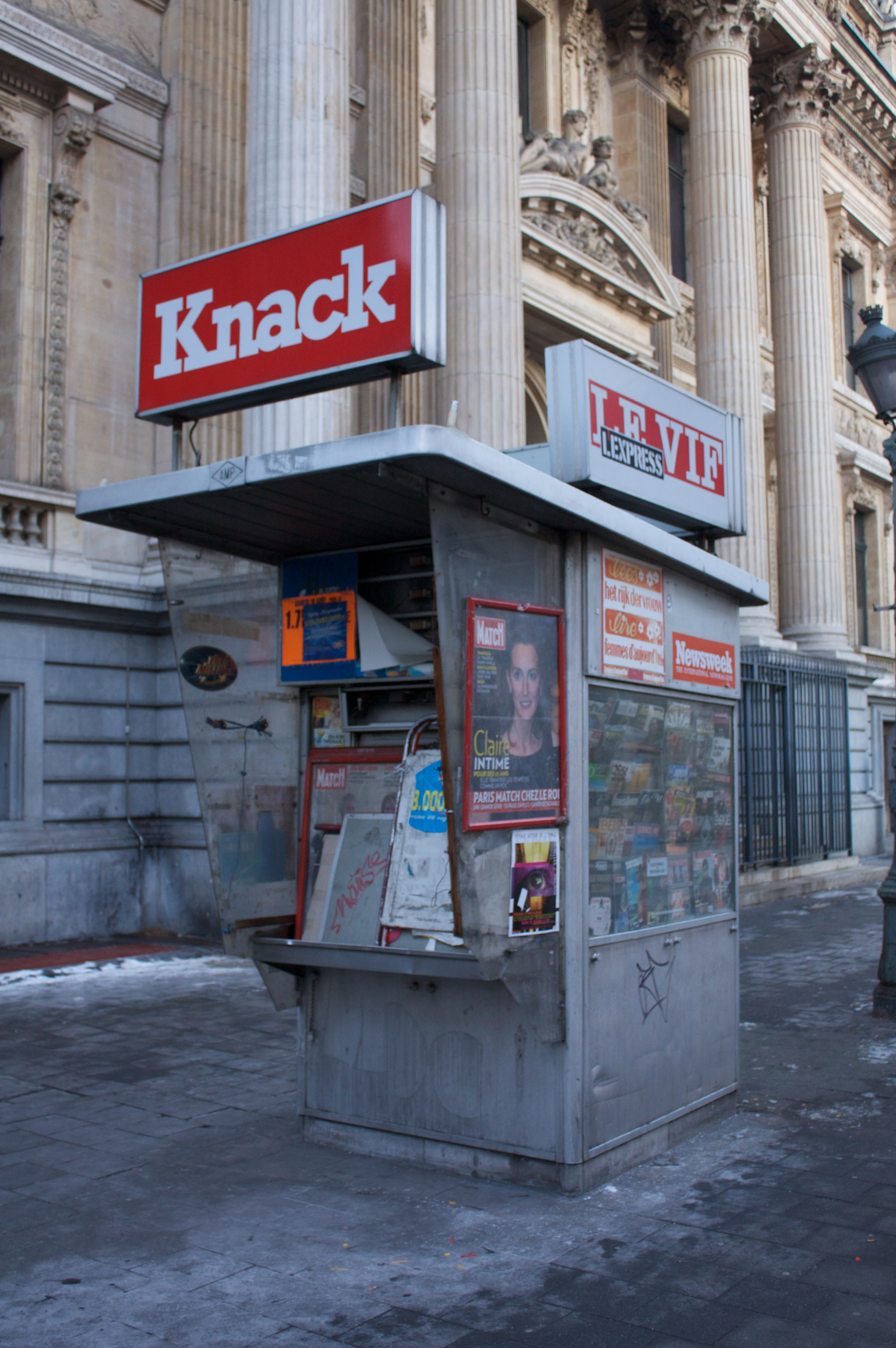
Knack magazine stand in Brussels, 2009

Knack was founded in 1971 as the first Dutch-language news magazine in the Belgium. The magazine was modelled on Time, Newsweek, Der Spiegel and L’Express. Knack has a left-liberal stance.

The owner of the magazine is Roularta Media Group. It is published weekly on Wednesdays. The headquarters of the magazine is in Brussels. It is Flemish equivalent of the French language news magazine Le Vif/L’Express which is also owned by Roularta Media Group. Both magazines are published by Roularta Printing, a subsidiary of the Roularta Media Group.

Knack has several supplements, Knack Weekend, Focus Knack and Mondiaal Nieuws, an alternative monthly news magazine. In 2010 Knack began to offer T'chin, a health supplement, together with its sister magazine Le Vif/L’Express.

== Circulation ==
Knack had a circulation of 123,924 copies in 1998 and 126,303 copies in 1999. In 2001 the circulation of the magazine was 144,000 copies.

During the period of 2006-2007 Knack had a circulation of 142,000 copies. The circulation of the magazine was 141,678 copies in 2008 and 141,361 copies during the first quarter of 2009. The magazine had a circulation of 112,928 copies in 2010 and 110,423 copies in 2011. Its circulation was 103,298 copies in 2012. The 2013 circulation of the weekly was 104.542 copies.

== See also ==
- List of magazines in Belgium
