= Vi over 60 =

Monthly seniors' magazine in Norway

- Categories: Seniors' magazine
- Frequency: Monthly
- Circulation: 54,990 (2022)
- Publisher: Grieg Media AS
- Founded: 1979; 46 years ago
- Company: Aller Media
- Country: Norway
- Based in: Bergen
- Language: Norwegian
- Website: Vi over 60

Vi over 60 (Norwegian: We over 60) is a Norwegian language monthly magazine for seniors and is published in Bergen, Norway.

== History and profile ==
Vi over 60 was established in 1979. The magazine is published on a monthly basis. It has been owned by different companies. In 1999, the owner and publisher of the magazine, Grieg Media AS, was acquired by the Belgian media company Roularta Media Group and Bayard Presse. In June 2008, the company was sold by them to the Norwegian media group, Aller. The magazine is published by Grieg Media AS, now a subsidiary of Aller Media. Its headquarters is in Bergen.

The target audience of Vi over 60 is the 60-plus men and women. The monthly covers articles on health and consumer affairs, law and rights, including inheritance, pension and legal and financial issues, and travel reports.

Johanne Grieg Kippenbroeck served as the editor-in-chief of the magazine. In 2003, Vi over 60 was the recipient of the best magazine award in Norway.

== Circulation ==
Vi over 60 sold 86,000 copies in 1999. The circulation of the magazine was 90,277 copies in 2011. Its circulation was 84,670 copies in 2013. The magazine sold 54,990 copies in 2022.
