= Het Rijk der Vrouw =

Belgian women's magazine (1925–1990)

- Categories: Women's magazine; Lifestyle magazine
- Founded: 1925
- Final issue: 1990
- Country: Belgium
- Based in: Brussels
- Language: Dutch
- OCLC: 428437809

Het Rijk der Vrouw (Dutch: Woman's Realm) was a Belgian women's magazine published in Brussels between 1925 and 1990.

== History and profile ==
The magazine was established in 1924, and its first issue appeared in 1925. Its original title was Het Modeblad. It was published by n.v. Het Rijk der Vrouw which was part of a company owned by Jan Meuwissen. The focus of the magazine was on fashion for women and girls. The magazine was renamed as Het Rijk der Vrouw in 1931 after it was redesigned.

Femmes d'Aujourd'hui was its sister publication, and both magazines were acquired by the publishing company J. Hoste in 1975. Later, Het Rijk der Vrouw became part of Almaspar. Mediaxis bought the magazine in 1990.

It was a conservative magazine emphasizing family values and connoisseurship. Its target audience was young women as well as experienced housewives. The magazine covered articles on fashion, home decoration and marriage. It also featured photonovels from the issue 617 dated 27 February 1957.

In 1990 Het Rijk der Vrouw went bankrupt and then, merged with Libelle, another Belgian women's magazine.

== See also ==
- List of magazines in Belgium
