= Hawa Air =

Belgian charter airline

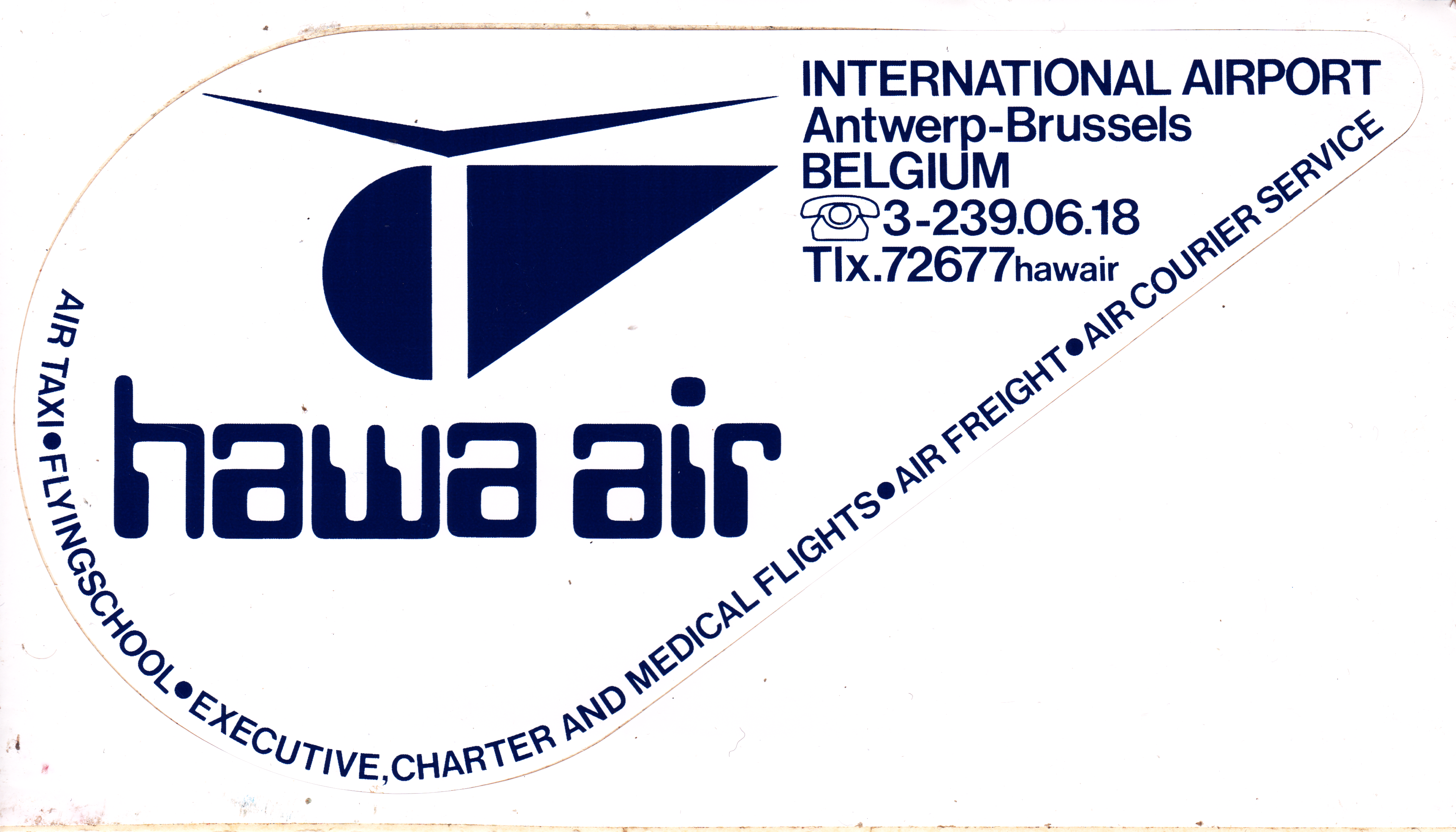

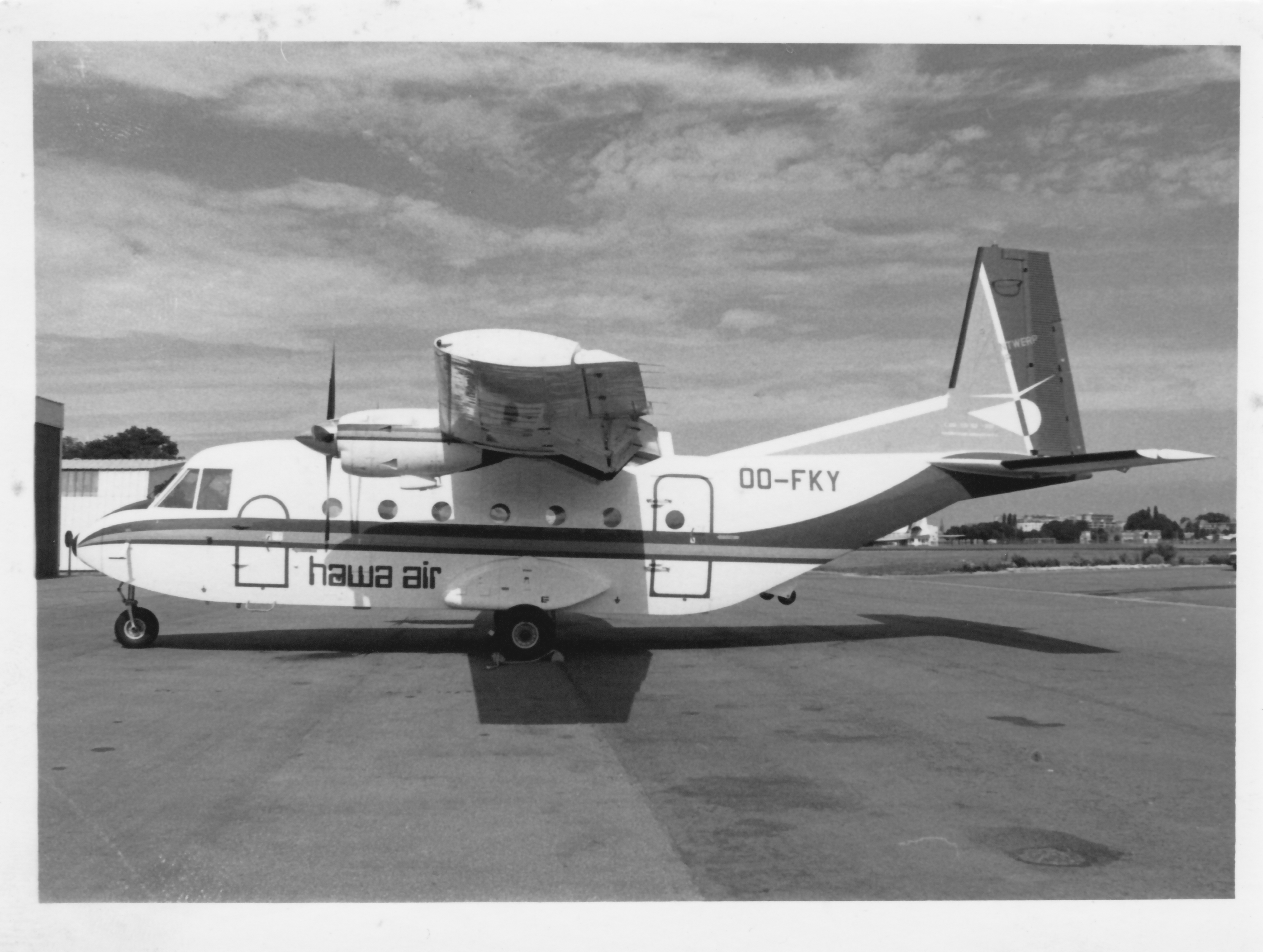
- CASA C-212-200 Aviocar
IATA	ICAO	Call sign
–	–	–
- Founded: 1959
- Ceased operations: 1988
- Hubs: ANR
- Secondary hubs: BRU, OST
- Headquarters: Deurne, Belgium
- Key people: Dr. Ahura Khaleghi Yazdi

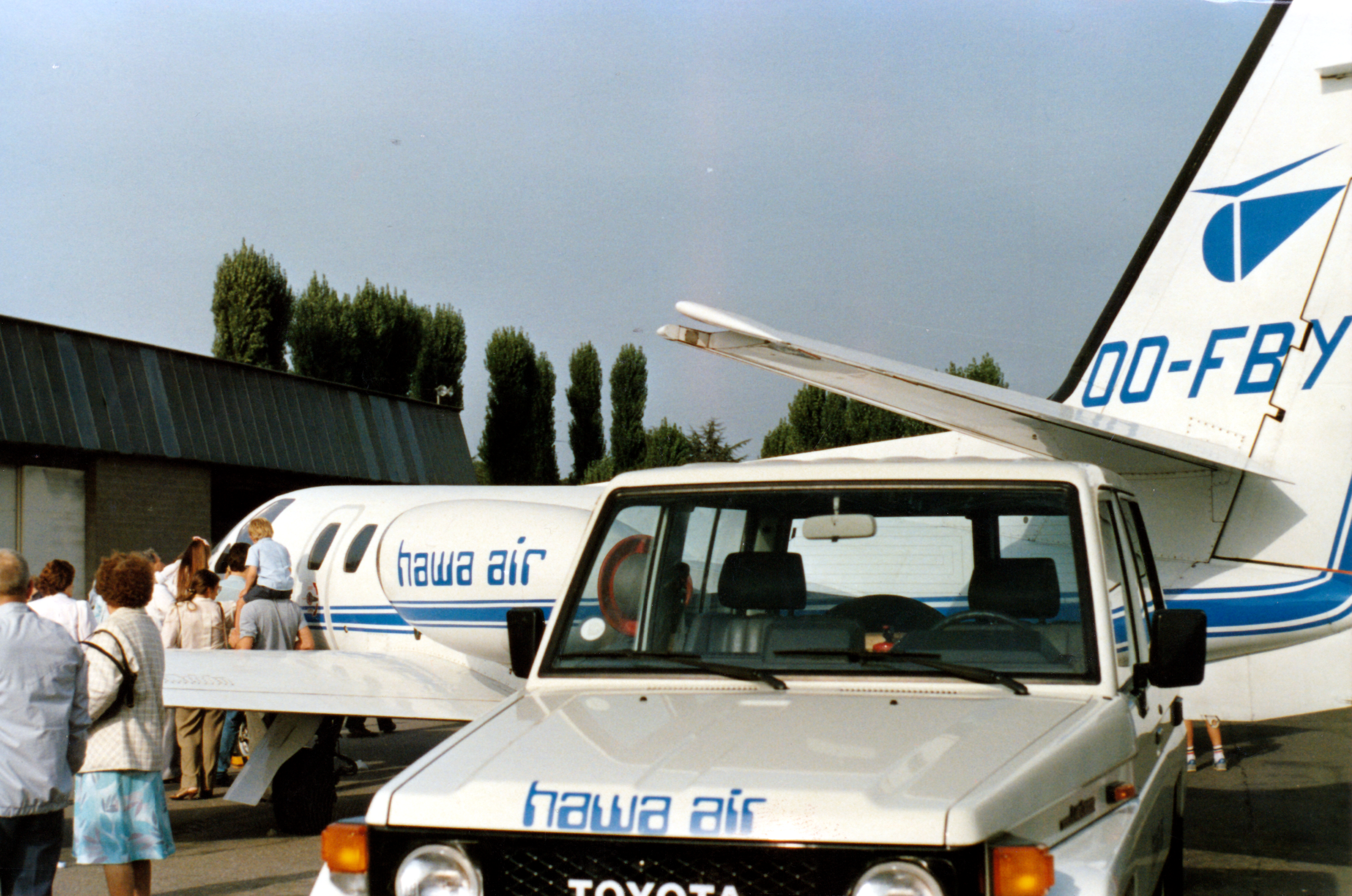
A Cessna Citation 500 executive jet and one company car during a public exhibition.

Hawa Air was a charter airline that operated from Deurne, Belgium, in the 1970s and 1980s. The airline flew international services on jet aircraft, but included a flight school, courier service, overnight delivery service and an aircraft maintenance facility.

== History ==
Hawa (Helicopter Aircraft World Association) initially was established in Switzerland in 1959 by Dr. Ahura Khaleghi Yazdi to collect worldwide aviation information and to keep that information updated for the global use of airman. The information was stored in either of these five categories:

- Aircraft Owners
- Directors and Managers of...
- Manufacturers and Suppliers of...
- Government Authorities
- Air Services

This initiative was later transferred to World Aviation magazine, while Hawa Air was reinvented to become a pure aviation company, active as a flight school, courier service, overnight delivery service, as well as an airliner and an aircraft maintenance facility. Hawa Air was the company's name when it started operations in Belgium where Dr. Ahura Khaleghi Yazdi initially set up a flying school to teach to individuals, airline pilots and air forces for countries going as far as the Middle-East and Africa. Hawa Air operated from the airport of Deurne, now known as Antwerp Airport, between 1975 and 1988. Hawa Air initially focused on private airplanes and had distributor rights for Belgium for Cessna, American Jet and Jeppersen, as well as other companies producing aviation related equipment. Hawa Air eventually switched to the more exclusive jets, which was started by its purchase of 3 Cessna Citation 500's from the Dutch Royalty.

Hawa's flying school back then was known for its unique educational program and complete services in coordination with major aircraft manufacturers.

Hawa Air flew locally for its daughter company Hawa Courier Services: one of the first overnight and worldwide delivery services, thanks to the enormous worldwide demand Khaleghi International tax-free services brought. These courier services required last minutes transportation of goods for which Hawa rented cargo or even passenger space from major airlines around the world. Thanks to existing contract with postal systems, Dr. Ahura Khaleghi Yazdi found better and more efficient ways to work on overnight delivery. The courier services initially and eventually were transferred to the newly established EMS through contracts with the Swedish, English, German and Dutch postal systems and were gradually instated all over Europe. Only a year later the EMS services were rolled out worldwide with the support of USPS. Although the EMS logo has stayed the same, the abbreviation changed from European Mail Services to Express Mail Systems.

The company was the first European airliner approved for using the Casa C-212-200 planes, which it used to transport mail for the Belgian Post. It received its first Aviocar plane May 26, 1986 for the transport of passengers and cargo. Additionally, Hawa Air was flying with an ACMI Leased Boeing 727 for European destinations as well as a McDonald-Douglas DC9 which flew New York-Brussels five times a week. As mentioned, Hawa Air started the first worldwide courier service, which operated until its closure. It also constructed a state-of-the-art maintenance center for general aviation. Although it was successful and was turning profit for both the airline and Antwerp Airport, Hawa Air was maneuvered to close down under political pressure in 1988.

== Fleet ==
Hawa Air's fleet consisted of the following aircraft for training, rental, cargo and passenger flights:

- 1 Cessna C150
- 2 Cessna C152
- 1 Cessna C170
- 4 Cessna C172
- 1 Cessna C177
- 1 Cessna C177RG
- 1 Cessna C182
- 3 Cessna Citation 500 Jets
- 1 Partenavia
- 1 Boeing 727 (ACMI Leased)
- 1 McDonald-Douglas DC9 (ACMI Leased)
- 1 Casa C-212-200 Aviocar
- 1 Piper 31P Navajo

== Hubs ==
- Deurne, Belgium (main hub)
- Ostend (Secondary Hub)
- Brussels International (Secondary Hub)
