= Alphonse-Jules Wauters =

Belgian historian, geographer, and editor

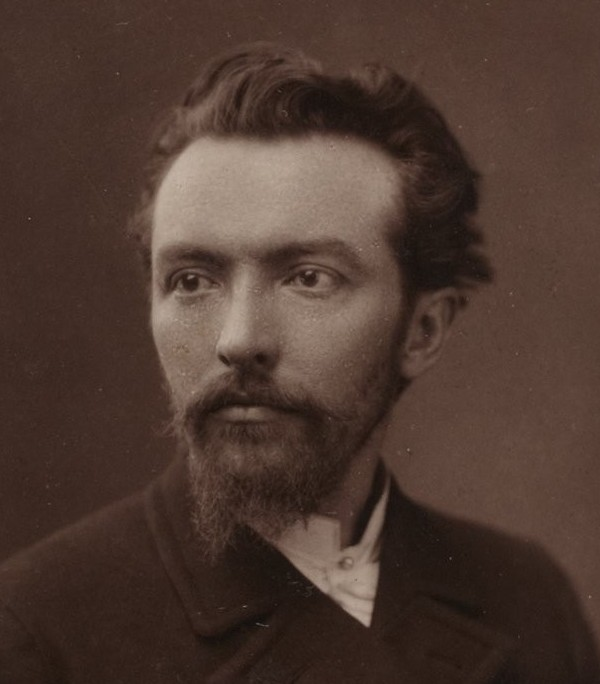
Geruzet Frères photograph portrait of Alphonse Wauters

Alphonse-Jules Wauters (1845–1916) was a Belgian art historian, geographer, and magazine editor.

== Life ==
Wauters was born in Brussels, Belgium, on 13 June 1845. In 1887 he became a professor of Art History at the Académie Royale des Beaux-Arts in Brussels, and in 1894 a member of the Royal Academy of Science, Letters and Fine Arts of Belgium.

His passion, however, was geography. He became Secretary of the Brussels Geographical Society, and founded and edited two geographical journals, Le Mouvement Géographique (1884–1922) and the shorter-lived Le Congo illustré (1891–1895), which supported projects for colonisation in Central Africa. Wauters died in Ixelles, Belgium, on 25 March 1916.

== Works ==
- La peinture flamande (Paris, 1883)
  - English edition as The Flemish School of Painting, tr. H. Rossel (London, 1885)
  - Dutch edition as De Vlaamsche Schilderkunst, tr. J. Sabbe (Ghent, 1887)
- Carte de l'état indépendant du Congo, dressée d'après les derniers renseignements (Brussels, 1887)
- Liste chronologique des doyens des corps de métiers de Bruxelles de 1696 à 1795 (Brussels, 1888)
- Croquis de la region entre la Côte de Guinée et Timbouctou (Brussels, 1888)
- Le Congo : dix ans d'exploration (Brussels, 1888)
- Stanley au secours d'Émin-Pacha (Paris, 1890)
  - published in English as Stanley's Emin Pasha Expedition (London, 1890)
- with A. Buyl, Bibliographie du Congo, 1880-1895 (Brussels, 1895)
- Carte du Bas Congo donnant le tracé du chemin de fer de Matadi au Stanley Pool (Brussels, 1896)
- Denis van Alsloot, peintre des archiducs Albert et Isabelle (Brussels, 1899)
- L'état indépendant du Congo (Brussels, 1899)
- Le Musée de Bruxelles. Tableaux anciens. Notice, guide & catalogue (Brussels, 1900)
- Album de l'exposition rétrospective de l'art belge : 80 reproductions hors texte d'oeuvres exposées à Bruxelles en 1905 avec catalogue et notices biographiques (Brussels, 1906)
- Histoire politique du Congo belge (Brussels, 1911)
