= Ien Ang =

Indonesian academic

- 洪宜安
- Born: 17 June 1954 (age 71); Surabaya, East Java, Indonesia

Academic work
- School or tradition: Cultural Studies
- Main interests: Media, cultural consumption, audiences, identity politics

May Ien Ang (Chinese: 洪宜安, born 17 June 1954) is a Professor of Cultural Studies at the Institute for Culture and Society at the University of Western Sydney (UWS), Australia, where she was the founding director and is currently an ARC Professorial Fellow. She is also a Fellow of the Australian Academy of the Humanities.

Born in Indonesia, but raised and educated in the Netherlands, Ang received her Doctorate in the Social and Cultural Sciences, from the University of Amsterdam in 1990. Her work focuses on media and cultural consumption, the study of media audiences, identity politics, nationalism and globalisation, migration and ethnicity, and issues of representation in contemporary cultural institutions. In 2001 she was awarded the Centenary Medal 'for service to Australian society and the humanities in cultural research'.

Her writing encompasses contemporary Asia and the changing world order, Australia-Asia relations, as well as theoretical and methodological issues. She is a public commentator in Australia and a member of the Council of the Australian Academy of the Humanities.

== Methodology ==
Ang relies heavily on the use qualitative case studies to illustrate her research instead of using quantitative methods to analyse audiences as was popular. Her first book Watching Dallas relied on the letters of 42 Dutch viewers of the popular television soap Dallas. Ang writes of her analytical method for the letters; they "cannot be taken at face value, 'they should be read 'symptomatically': we must search for what is behind the explicitly written, for the presuppositions and accepted attitudes concealed within them. In other words the letters must be regarded as texts, as discourses people produce when they want to express or have to account for their own preference…" Also, Ang does not attempt to generalize or triangulate the cases study to apply it to other cases, instead arguing that it was sufficient to illustrate the audience response to Dallas in this instance alone, a style which is increasing in popularity. Ang pioneered this method whilst other practitioners were developing pseudo scientific models to apply to the social sciences, Louise Spence, a fellow soap opera researcher, praises Ang's methodological style: “She had to redefine the position of the analyst and the language of analysis, challenging the once-dominant ideal of a detached observer using neutral language to describe ‘brute facts’, demystifying the idea of any strict separation of theory and data. Her effort reminds us that researchers are neither innocent nor omniscient”

== Selected bibliography ==
- Watching Dallas: Soap Opera and the Melodramatic Imagination, Methuen, 1985.
- Desperately Seeking the Audience, Routledge, 1991
- Living Room Wars: Rethinking Media Audiences for a Postmodern World, Routledge, 1996
- (ed. with Sharon Chalmers, Lisa Law and Mandy Thomas), Alter/Asians: Asian-Australian Identities in Art, Media and Popular Culture, Pluto Press, 2000
- On Not Speaking Chinese: Living between Asia and the West, Routledge, 2001
- The SBS Story, UNSW Press, 2008

For more complete list see Ang's page at the UWS.

=== Watching Dallas ===
Watching Dallas was first written in Dutch (as Het geval Dallas) and released in the Netherlands in 1982, later translated into English in 1985. The work studies how an audience experiences pleasure in a soap opera using the replies of 42 viewers to an advertisement placed by Ang. As the research was carried out in the Netherlands and the case study was the US soap opera Dallas the work also questions how an audience responds to an international export. Ang continues this line of research in her later book Living Room Wars: Rethinking Media Audience for a Postmodern World as she researches how national content is influenced by the introduction of international content and the effect this has on both national programming and broadcast stations.

=== The SBS Story ===
This work was co-authored with Gay Hawkins and Lamia Dabboussy, the Australian Special Broadcasting Service cooperated extensively in the collaboration of this work. This research argues that a television audience is an internationally diverse group rather than a nationally homogeneous group as was represented in Watching Dallas. They argue that the SBS serves a vital role by representing a country as it actually is and reflecting a more holistic group rather than the narrow portion generally depicted and catered to in mainstream programming "While the imperial cosmopolitanism induced by American TV is characterised by overcoming difference, suggesting that we can all watch the same thing despite our differences, the multicultural cosmopolitanism of SBS proceeds by trying to incorporate and acknowledging the landscape of difference that is world culture".
