= On the Radio =

On the Radio may refer to:

- "On the Radio" (The Concretes song), 2006
- "On the Radio" (Donna Summer song), 1979
- On the Radio: Greatest Hits Volumes I & II, a 1979 album by Donna Summer
- "On the Radio" (Groove Coverage song), 2006
- "On the Radio" (Regina Spektor song), 2006
- "... On the Radio (Remember the Days)", a 2001 single by Nelly Furtado
- "On the Radio", a song from Cheap Trick's 1978 album, Heaven Tonight
- "On the Radio", a song from Hurt's third album, Vol. II
- "On the Radio", a 2006 single by Poni Hoax
- "On the Radio", a song from Thunder's 2008 album, Bang!
- "On the Radio", a song from Crash Crew's 1984 album, The Crash Crew
- "On the Radio" (Three Up, Two Down), a 1989 television episode

== See also ==
- Radio (disambiguation)
