= Together (magazine) =

International lifestyle magazine based in Belgium

Together is an international lifestyle magazine based in Brussels, Belgium. The magazine is published ten times per year, and was created in 2006 by Jérôme Stéfanski.

== Distribution ==
The magazine prints around 20,000 copies of every issue, which are distributed by hosts and hostesses in the environs of Brussels' European institutions such as the European Parliament.

== Publisher ==
In 2008, David McGowan became the magazine's publisher.

== Editors ==
James Drew was the magazine's first editor, from 2007 onwards, and he was joined by his business partner Colin Moors from 2008 to 2010. Drew left the position in May 2011, though Moors and Drew still contribute articles regularly. Drew was followed by Patricia Kelly as editor. Paul Morris succeeded Kelly in October 2012.

== Features ==
The magazine features interviews with entertainers, fashion designers, politicians, and entrepreneurs. It also offers articles and editorials relating to themes such as the European Union, high-class fashion, health, travel, restaurants, achieving success in life, seduction, going out, cinema and culture.
