= Recherches husserliennes =

Recherches husserliennes was a Belgian French-speaking journal devoted to Husserlian-style phenomenological philosophy. Founded in 1994 by Robert Brisart, the review ceased publication in 2006. It was headquartered in Brussels.
