= Femmes d'Aujourd'hui =

Weekly magazine published in Belgium

- March 2019 edition
- Categories: Women's magazine
- Frequency: Weekly
- Founded: 1933
- First issue: 1 April 1933; 93 years ago
- Company: Roularta Media Group
- Country: Belgium
- Based in: Mechelen
- Language: French
- Website: Femmes d’Aujourd’hui
- ISSN: 0014-9950
- OCLC: 472861181

Femmes d'Aujourd'hui (French: Women of Today) is a weekly women's magazine published in Mechelen, Belgium. Founded in 1933, it is one of the oldest magazines in the country and the first Belgian women's magazine.

== History and profile ==
Femmes d’Aujourd’hui was first published on 1 April 1933, being the first Belgian women's magazine. Its founder was an entrepreneur, Jan Meuwissen, and it was published by s.a. Femmes d’Aujourd’hui. The magazine was part of a company owned by Jan Meuwissen which also published Het Rijk der Vrouw. The publishing company J. Hoste acquired both magazines in 1975, and the Sparta company, part of the publishing group Van Thillo and the Walloon businessman Maurice Brébart also bought their shares. All shares of the magazines were sold to the Van Thillo group in 1990 which would established the De Persgroep company. Immediately after these transactions Femmes d’Aujourd’hui and Het Rijk der Vrouw were acquired by Mediaxis.

Mediaxis sold Femmes d’Aujourd’hui to Sanoma in 2001. Then the magazine was published by Sanoma Magazines Belgium on a weekly basis. It was acquired by the Roularta Media Group in June 2018.

Femmes d’Aujourd’hui has its headquarters in Mechelen. The weekly was formerly based in Brussels. The magazine has been distributed in France since the 1950s. It had sister publications, Lectures d’Aujourd’hui in French and Lectuur voor Allen in Dutch. The former was in circulation between September 1952 and 27 August 1966, whereas the latter appeared from September 1952 to 29 December 1956.

Femmes d’Aujourd’hui covers various sections for fashion, beauty, health, decoration, tourism, gardening and psychology. After 1960 the weekly began to include romance photos and graphic fiction. At the beginning of the 1970s it featured graphic editions of classical novels such as Jane Austen's Pride and Prejudice. Between 1952 and 1991 the magazine also published the comics by several caricaturists on three pages per week, including Edmond Calvo, Henri Vernes and William Vance.

Femmes d’Aujourd’hui celebrated its 80th anniversary with a special edition published on 28 March 2013.

== Editors-in-chief ==
The founding editor-in-chief of Femmes d’Aujourd’hui was Rosita Verbeeck who gave its title and designed its content and frequency. Annick Poncelet was the editor-in-chief of the magazine whose tenure ended in January 2003 when she resigned from the post. Anouk Van Gestel also served as the editor-in-chief of the weekly. As of 2023 its editor-in-chief was Anne Daix.

== Circulation ==
In 1961 Femmes d’Aujourd’hui had a circulation of 1,122,000 copies in France, and nearly 200,000 copies in Belgium. During the period of 2006-2007 it was the third best-selling women's magazine in Belgium with a circulation of 130,000 copies. The circulation of the magazine was 100,038 copies in 2010 and 95,621 copies in 2011. It fell to 93,516 copies in 2012 and to 92,873 copies in 2013. Between July 2013 and June 2014 the circulation of the magazine was 86,434 copies. It sold 84,596 copies in 2014.

== See also ==
- List of magazines in Belgium
