= World Aviation =

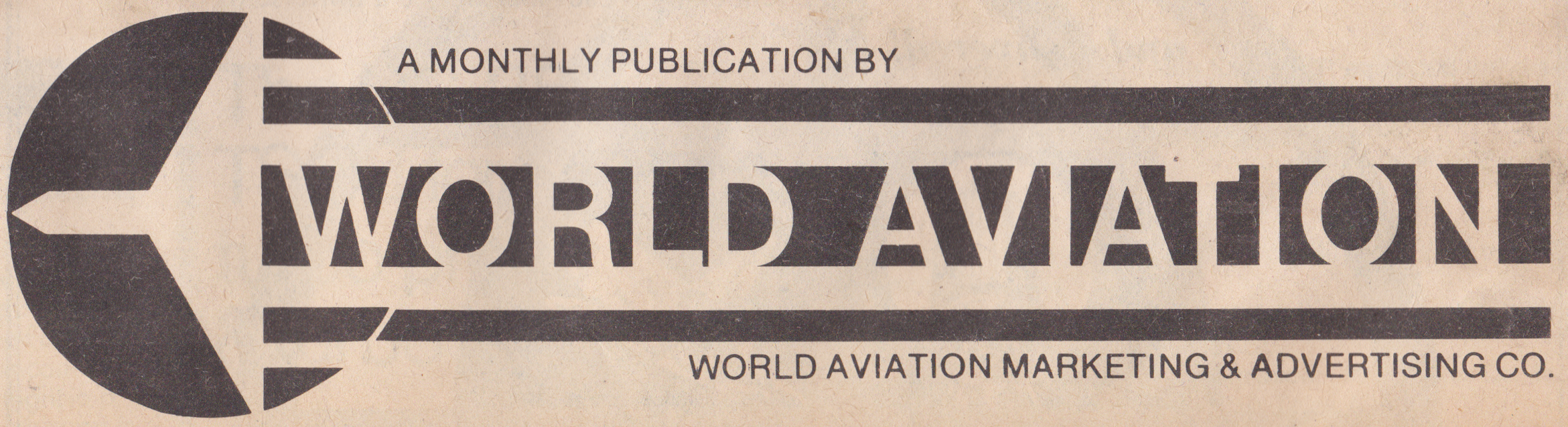
- Categories: Aerospace
- Frequency: Monthly
- Circulation: 170,417 (September 1984)
- Publisher: Dr. Ahura Khaleghi Yazdi
- Founded: 1960
- Company: World Aviation Marketing & Advertising
- Country: Belgium
- Language: English

World Aviation magazine was a long-running publication for the aviation industry. It was aimed at companies and aviation professionals and was freely distributed to more than 170.000 manually selected addresses worldwide. Its front page famously had a quote by US astronaut David Scott to Dr. Ahura F. K. Yazdi (founder of World Aviation): "I've been fortunate enough to have a view of the world that few men have seen... to realize just how small it can really be. WORLD AVIATION will make the world a smaller, closer place for you to do business. We've needed this publication for a long time".

== History ==
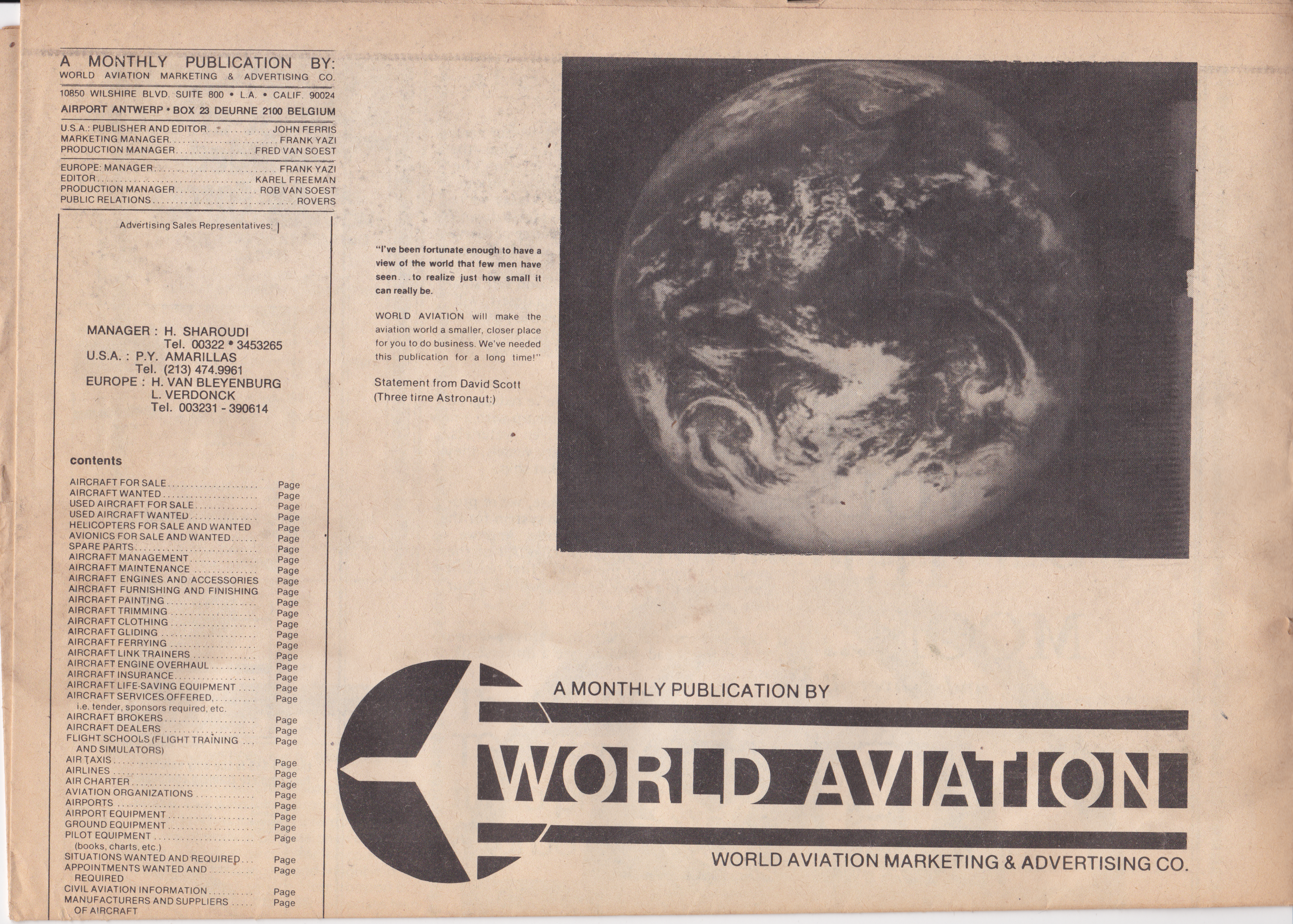
World Aviation as it appeared until its relaunch on glossy, full-color paper in September 1984. Note the quote by US astronaut David Scott to Dr. Ahura F. K. Yazdi (founder of World Aviation, left of the Earth's photo.

Dr. Ahura Khaleghi Yazdi started preparation for World Aviation in 1959 under the Hawa Air umbrella. He addressed embassies and consulates requesting them lists of companies and individuals active in the aviation industry. At the same time, he noticed how contemporary magazines were distributed on small regional scales in multiple languages. He found out that geographically dispersed buyers and sellers were not always able to find each other, which the idea of World Aviation was born from.

The magazine's goal was to provide aviation professionals and companies with a unique global medium connecting different geographical regions and globally dispersed aviation world to inform and update it with any new development in the industry, to allow them to promote and sell their products using one global publication. The information was initially collected by Helicopter Aircraft World Association or Hawa until World Aviation magazine was officially founded and registered in 1960. Prior to World Aviation magazine, the aviation industry needed communication through different multilingual and multinational magazines. World Aviation allowed to target them all at once.

The magazine was distributed free of charge to over 170.000 manually selected companies and individuals. Over the years it grew from one recto-verso page on newsprint paper to a hefty tome of over 100 pages. In September 1984, the magazine was relaunched on glossy, full-color pages. It was till free to Aviation top decision-makers in 183 countries, while non-selected individuals or companies could buy the publication for the equivalent of 200 Belgian Francs (US$5). World Aviation has successfully existed since its inception, became a "bible" to every single aviation company worldwide and was later sold to a provisional publishing company, which eventually sold it through to McGraw-Hill.

== Layout ==
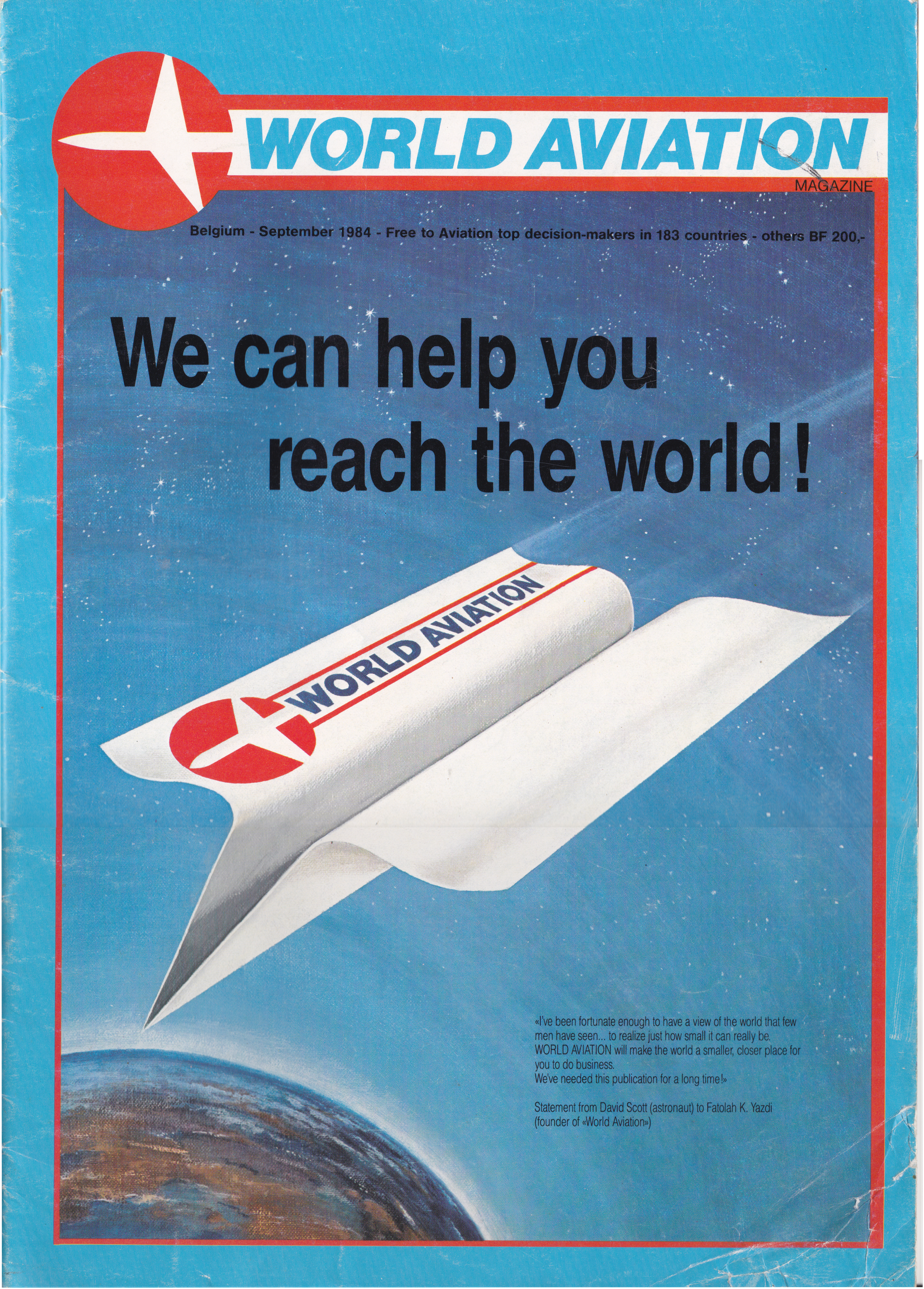
World Aviation as it appeared with its relaunch on glossy, full-color paper in September 1984. Note the quote by US astronaut David Scott, below the paper plane, to Ahura Khaleghi Yazdi.

World Aviation's layout was simple but effective. The September 1984 relaunch issue consisted of 40 pages:

- The Cover,
- The founder and chairman of the board's foreword,
- A table of contents and contact details,
- Classifieds offering used aircraft located worldwide,
- Both center pages showed a map divided in regions, which allegedly were used as a basis for ICAO's regional codes,
- 9 pages of smaller classifieds, costing $30 for 120 characters, then an additional $10 for each 40 characters,
- 20 pages were for full-page adverts,
- The back-cover was reserved for the Distribution per Country table.
