= Radio Magazine =

Electronics technology magazine in China

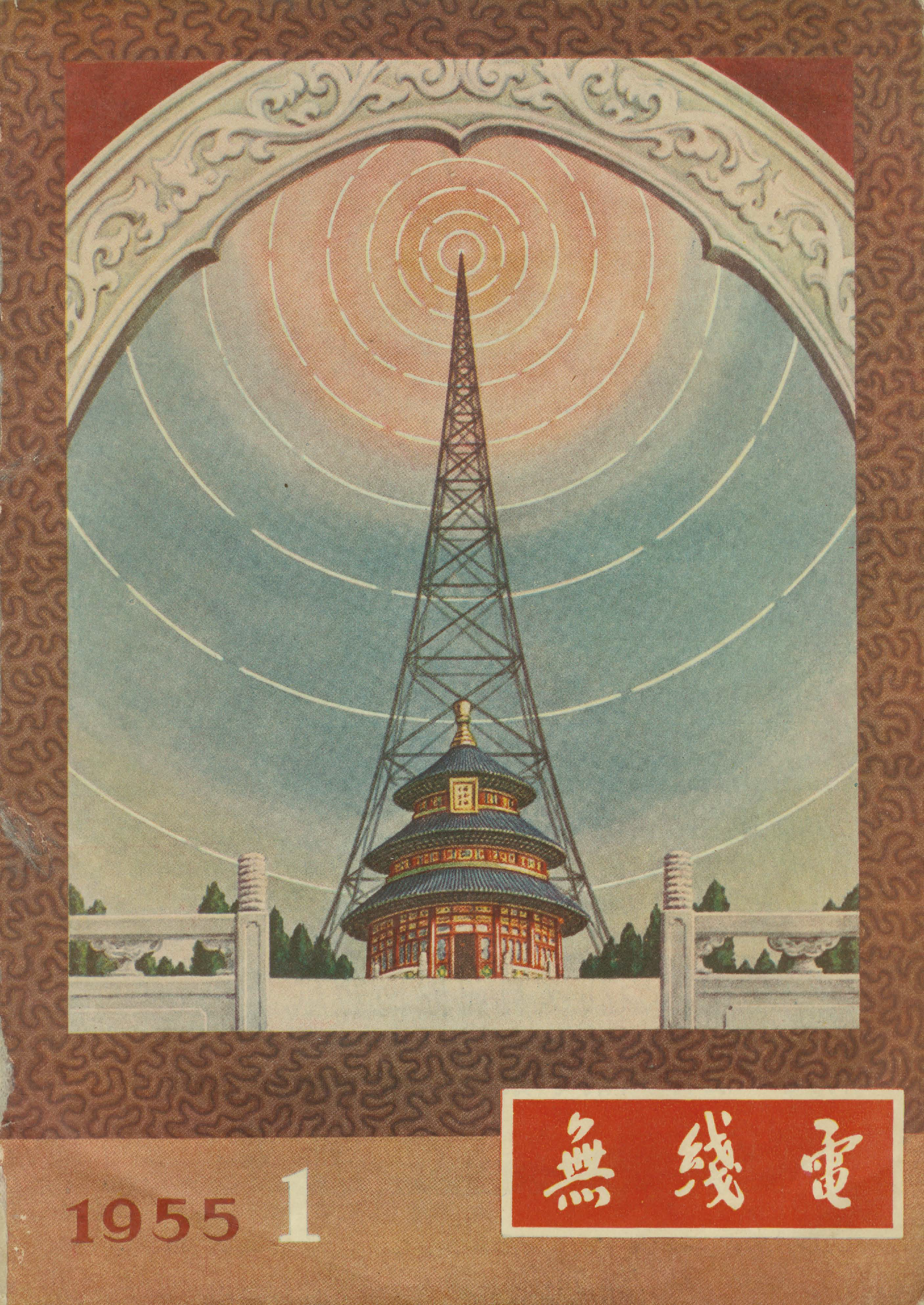
- Cover of the January 1955 issue
- Chief Editor: Jun Li
- Former editors: Hua Fang
- Categories: Electronics technology
- Frequency: Monthly
- Format: Printed copy and digital copy
- Publisher: Posts & Telecommunications Press
- Total circulation: 300,000,000
- Founded: 1955
- Country: People's Republic of China
- Based in: Beijing
- Language: Chinese
- Website: www.radio.com.cn
- ISSN: 0512-4174
- OCLC: 426320872

Radio Magazine (Chinese: 无线电) is a Chinese electronics technology magazine published monthly by Posts & Telecommunications Press of China. It is overseen by Ministry of Industry and Information Technology of the People's Republic of China. It has the longest publishing history and the largest circulation among all electronics and radio communication newspapers and magazines.

== History ==
Radio Magazine was first published in 1955. Its cumulative circulation today is over 300 million.

In 1992, Radio Magazine received the first prize in China Excellent Science and Technology Journal Awards by Ministry of Science and Technology (China), the CCPPD, and General Administration of Press and Publication. In the same year, it was awarded "Overall Excellence Magazine" by Beijing Press and Publication Bureau. In 1999, 2001, and 2005, it was awarded “China National Journal Awards” by General Administration of Press and Publication and Ministry of Science and Technology.
