= Fire (magazine) =

French-language Belgian magazine

AMI/ArMI/Fire
- Cover of the final issue (August 2002)
- Categories: Military, civilian fireams, Militaria.
- Frequency: Monthly
- First issue: 1979
- Final issue: 2002
- Country: Belgium
- Language: French

The Belgian-Francophone magazine AMI (Armes-Militaria-Informations-Tir) was first published in 1979. It published articles about firearms and militaria.

It became ArMI in 1987, then Fire in 1990. The magazine Fire, owned by the mercenaries Bob Denard and Christian Tavernier, was discontinued in 2002. Philippe Graton regularly contributed as a freelance journalist.

These magazines were sold at newsstands in Belgium, France and Switzerland.

== See also ==
- List of magazines in Belgium
