= Internet real estate =

Real estate terminology

An electronic version of the real estate industry, Internet real estate is the concept of publishing housing estates for sale or rent online, and for consumers seeking to buy or rent properties through such platforms. Often, Internet real estate properties are listed and managed by landlords themselves. However, there are few exceptions where an online real estate agent would exist, still dealing via the World Wide Web and often stating a flat fee and not a commission based on the percentage of total sales. Internet real estate platforms surfaced around 1999 when technology advanced and statistics prove that more than 1 million homes were sold by the owners themselves in the United States alone in 2000. Some of the primary Internet real estate platforms include Zillow, Trulia, Yahoo! Real Estate, Redfin and Realtor.com.

== International e-real estate statistics ==
According to Realtors, 90% of home buyers searched online during the process of seeking a property and the percentage of consumers searching for information relating to real estate on Google has increased by 253% over the last 4 years. With an increase of 5.5% from just 0% of people using the Internet to carry our house sales within the last decade in the UK, figures show that there will be a huge increase to a percentage of 50 by 2018. Figures will hit 70% by 2020, with only a third of the UK population seeking help through traditional methods of real estate agents.

== Process of dealing with Internet real estate ==
The process of the concept of Internet real estate usually begins with owners listing their homes with its quoted price on online platforms such as Trulia, Yahoo! Real Estate, cyber home, The New York Times and even eBay. The greater number of platform owners list their properties, the greater the diffusion of information. As buyers who are seeking a piece of property, search engines are usually their first pit-stop. "69% of home shoppers who take action on real estate brand website begin their research with a local term, i.e. "Houston homes for sale" on a search engine", reports Realtor. Once a potential buyer contacts the seller, they would go through the details of the property – sizing, amenities, condition, and pricing, if not stated. After which, an appointment for the viewing of the property would usually be scheduled and in some cases, potential buyers may request for a refurnish of certain amenities or parts of the property. If terms and conditions are met between both parties, the buyer would usually negotiate for the best offer if interested and a deposit may be requested by the owner. Finally, both parties will agree on a date for full payment, signing on official payment, and the handover of keys to the property.

== Design ==
Generally, buyers are attracted to Internet real estate due to its accessibility and the range of properties available.

=== Advantages ===
==== Convenience ====
Due to distance decay, personal commitments, and time constraints, many turn to the web to carry out their daily activities – online shopping, online bookings and for communication between parties. Using the web to put out properties for sale and purchasing properties is no exception. The age of technology has aided in reducing time and money within Internet real estate. Users may list their properties or search for them at their fingertips, reaching out to a greater number of people significantly than traditional methods. In contrast, the traditional methods of contacting and meeting up with a real estate agent cost more money (agent and transportation fees) and time.

==== Direct communications and transactions ====
One of the prime differences between traditional real estate and Internet real estate is often the middleman's absence, known as a broker or a real estate agent. At times, real estate agents may be present, still dealing with customers directly from the web. Real estate agents often profit by absorbing a certain percentage of the final sale or rent price as commission. There are cases where commission percentage hits a figure of 6% in America. Internet real estate reduces the cost of an agent and conserves time spent relaying amongst three parties.

==== Human interaction ====
The use of the Internet has, in turn, reduced time between human interaction, which buyers do crave at times.

== Disadvantages ==
Just like any other operations, risks do exist when dealing with Internet real estate. There have been cases where personal details and financial information were copied when cybercriminals posed as sellers who listed their properties. Unfortunately, they published fake information about themselves and their properties and collected deposits and rent for a property of which they had no ownership. Furthermore, using the web to deal with real estate increases the chances of data being encrypted or retrieved.
