= Roularta =

Belgian media company

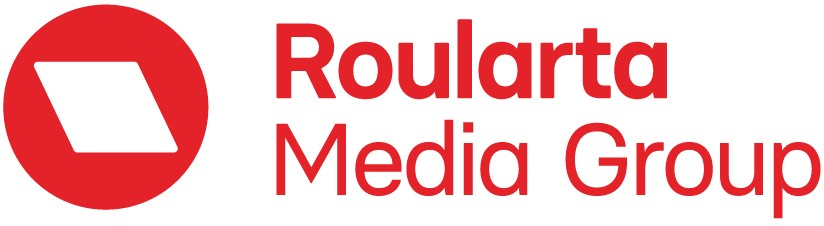
- Industry: Media
- Founded: 1954; 72 years ago
- Headquarters: Roeselare, Belgium
- Key people: Willy De Nolf (founder); Rik de Nolf (CEO)
- Products: L'Express; Knack
- Website: roularta.be

Roularta Media Group is a publishing and broadcasting company based in Roeselare, Belgium. Its operations were started in 1954.

== History and profile ==
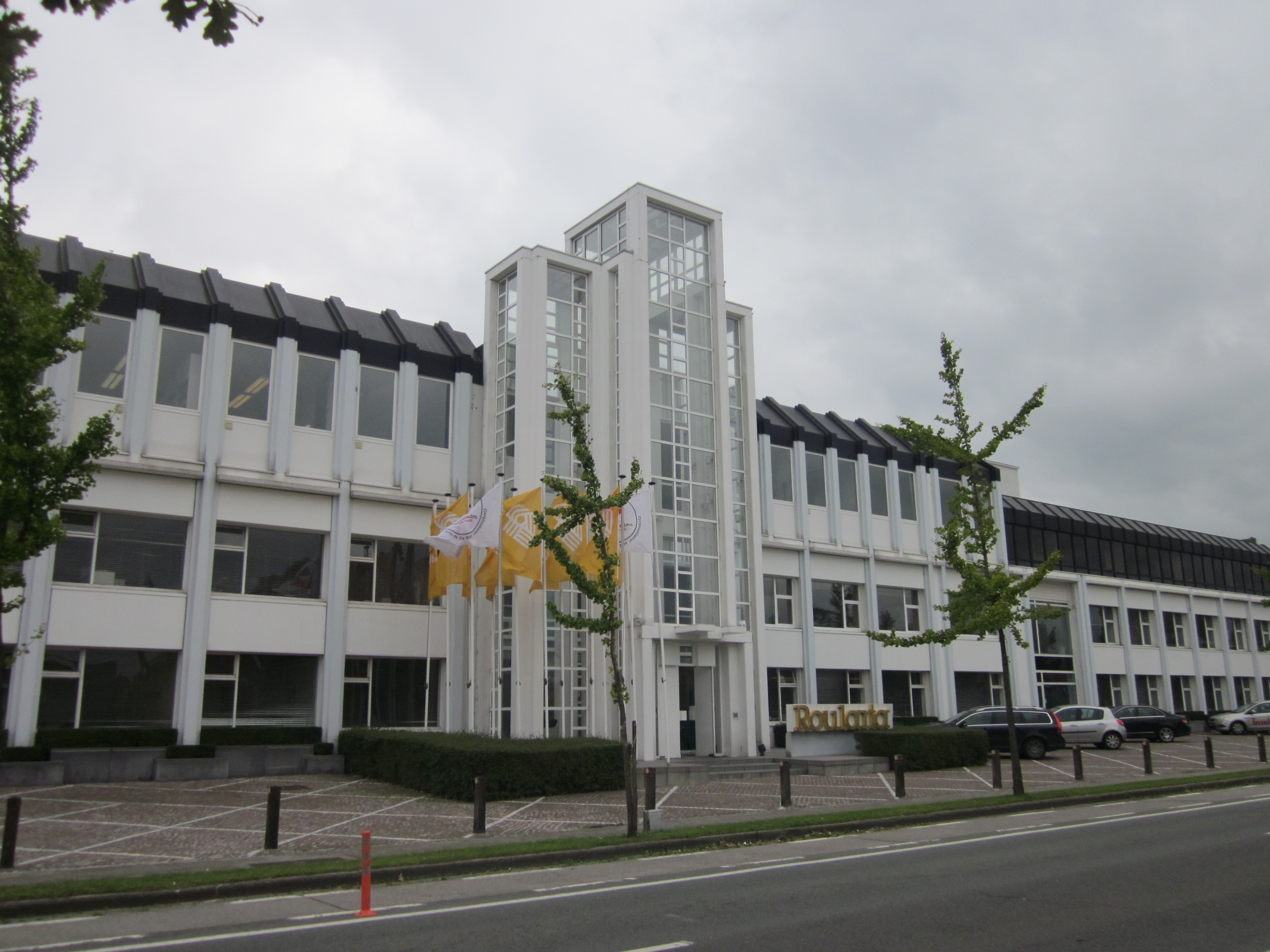
Roeselare-Roularta

Roularta was established by lawyer Willy De Nolf together with his wife Marie-Thérèse De Clerck in 1954. The group operates in the France, the Netherlands, and Portugal in addition to its native Belgium. The chief executive officer of the company is Rik de Nolf, who succeeded his father, Willy De Nolf, in the post in 1981.

In the early years the group published and distributed free newspapers in the Dutch-speaking regions of Belgium. The first publication of the company was a weekly magazine, De Weekbode.

The group has two main segments: Print media and audiovisual media. The print media segment consists of free newspapers such as De Streekkrant, De Zondag and Steps published in Belgium and magazines.

Roularta publishes Dutch language and French language magazines in Belgium. The group was top magazine publishing company in Belgium in 2008 with a total revenue of €101,062,000 . The same year it owned 24.2% of the French language magazines and 10.6% of the Dutch language magazines in the country.

The group is the sole owner of news magazines published in the country and has a monopoly in this sector. News magazines Knack and Le Vif/L’Express are owned by it. The Belgian business magazine Trends is also part of the company.

In addition, the group is the owner of some French magazines most of which it acquired in 2006. These include L'Express, L'Expansion, L'Etudiant and Point de Vue. At the beginning of 2015 the group sold some of its French titles, namely L'Express, L'Expansion, Mieux Vivre Votre Argent, Lire, Classica, Pianiste and Studio Cine Live, to French businessman Patrick Drahi. The group also owned the Norwegian magazine Vi over 60 from 1999 to June 2008.

The other segment includes co-ownership of Medialaan which includes TV and radio activities (Q-music, 4FM) and of the Regionale Media Maatschappij which owns two local TV channels, Focus TV and WTV. Kanaal Z / Canal Z which is a Belgian news and business channel is also part of the group. In addition, the group has internet properties such as lexpress.fr, knack.be and letudiant.fr.

In 2004 the Roularta acquired the Press News, the Belgian publisher of Royals, Dynasty, Hors Serie and Ace magazines. In March 2012 the group started the Dutch edition of the news and lifestyle magazine the Good Life in Belgium. Coface Services Belgium was bought by the group in March 2013. In September 2014 the group became the sole owner of the DSDW and Roularta Printing which had been partly owned by it.

=== Sale of Medialaan ===
In 2018 De Persgroep acquired Roularta's 50 percent stake in Medialaan. Roularta received a 50 percent stake in Mediafin (publisher of the Belgian financial dailies L'Echo and De Tijd) and 217.5 million euros in cash. Roularta announced the deal fit well with its intention to refocus on local media and the publication of quality magazines and newspapers for a quality-seeking target audience.

== Assets ==
=== Flanders (Belgium) ===
Local media

- De Krant van West-Vlaanderen
- Deze Week
- De Zondag
- Steps

Newspapers

- De Tijd (50%, with Groupe Rossel)

Magazines

- Knack and its supplements Knack Weekend, Focus Knack, Bodytalk and MO*
- Trends and its supplement Trends Style
- Plus Magazine
- Feeling
- Flair
- La Maison Victor

Television

- Focus/WTV
- Kanaal Z

=== Wallonia-Brussels (Belgium) ===
Newspapers

- L'Echo (50%, with Groupe Rossel)

Magazines

- Le Vif/L'Express and its supplements Le Vif Weekend, Vif Focus and Bodytalk
- Trends-Tendances and its supplement Trends Style
- Plus Magazine
- Flair
- La Maison Victor
- Télépro (with Bayard Presse)

Television

- Canal Z

=== International ===
In the beginning of the 2000s Roularta had investments in Slovenia. As of 2010 the company was the owner of the Slovenian biweekly City Magazine.

The La Maison Victor magazine is not only published in both the Flemish and Walloon parts of Belgium, but also in the Netherlands and Germany. The Walloon version is distributed and sold in France as well.

Roularta owns stakes in two publishing companies, one in the Netherlands and one in Germany. Both are joint ventures with the French press and publishing company Bayard Presse.

- SPN (Senior Publications Nederland) (Netherlands)
  - Plus Magazine
  - +Gezond
  - Plus Puzzels
  - G/Geschiedenis
- Bayard Mediengruppe Deutschland (Germany)
