= Vlaanderen (periodical) =

Dutch art and culture periodical

- Categories: Fine arts, Literature, Heritage, Culture
- Frequency: two-monthly
- Founded: 1952
- Final issue: 2017
- Country: Belgium
- Based in: Wingene
- ISSN: 0042-7683

Vlaanderen, originally West-Vlaanderen (founded 1952), was a Dutch-language periodical of art and culture, founded as the organ of the Christelijk Vlaams Kunstenaarsverbond Westvlaanderen (Christian Flemish Artists' Association West Flanders) under the chairmanship of the Christian democrat politician Jozef Storme. The title was changed in 1966. The periodical ceased publication in 2017, but the title continued as a reviews website under the name Kunsttijdschrift Vlaanderen.
