= Radio (Belgium) =

Radio magazine in Belgium (1923–1940)

- Editor: Juliaan Vandepitte (1923–1928)
- Categories: Radio magazine
- Frequency: Monthly
- Founder: Juliaan Vandepitte
- Founded: 1923
- First issue: July 1923
- Final issue: May 1940
- Country: Belgium
- Language: Dutch

Radio was a monthly amateur radio magazine which was published in Flanders, Belgium, from 1923 to 1940. Its subtitle was Algemeen maandschrift voor radio, telegrafie en telefonie (Dutch: General monthly magazine for radio, telegraphy and telephony).

== History and profile ==
Radio was first published in July 1923. Its founder was Juliaan Vandepitte who also edited and published articles in the magazine until his death in May 1928. The stated aim of the magazine was to expand the knowledge about the radio science in Flanders. It came out monthly. The contributors of the magazine were mostly radio amateurs. Father Leopold Vandepitte published articles in the magazine.

Radio ceased publication in May 1940.
