= Technische Revue =

TR (Technische Revue), since renamed IEN D-A-CH, is a German magazine created in 1982 primarily for manufacturing industry professionals. It is published eight times a year by TIMGlobal Media.

== Awards ==
The Technical Review/TR-online was awarded the 2006 LOF Innovation Prize at the annual conference of the Trade and Science Publishers Network (UVW) on January 12, 2006.
