= Industrial Engineering News Europe =

Belgian monthly magazine

- Categories: Industry, technology
- Frequency: Monthly
- Publisher: TIMGlobal Media
- First issue: 1975; 51 years ago
- Country: Belgium
- Language: English
- Website: https://www.ien.eu/

IEN Europe (Industrial Engineering News) is a monthly magazine launched in 1975 for industry professionals. It is published by Thomas Industrial Media BVBA.

== Circulation ==
The magazine is free and available only on request for industry professionals. Over 54 000 copies are distributed ten times a year.
