= Big Brother (Dutch TV series) =

Dutch television series

- Original logo of Big Brother
- Genre: Reality competition
- Created by: John de Mol Jr.
- Directed by: Tom Six, et al.
- Presented by: Rolf Wouters; Daphne Deckers; Beau van Erven Dorens; Esther Duller; Patty Brard; Martijn Krabbé; Bridget Maasland; Ruud de Wild; Renate Verbaan
- Country of origin: Netherlands
- Original language: Dutch
- No. of seasons: 8

Production
- Production company: John de Mol Produkties

Original release
- Network: Veronica/Yorin
- Release: 16 September 1999 – 23 December 2002
- Network: Talpa
- Release: 24 August 2005 – 27 November 2006

Related
- Secret Story; Big Brother (Dutch and Belgian TV series)

Big Brother is the original Dutch version of the international reality television franchise Big Brother. It created a reality TV-show format where contestants live in an isolated house and try to avoid being evicted by viewers to win a prize at the end. The original Dutch version of the show was initially aired from 1999 to 2006 for six regular seasons, and two celebrity editions. Many international versions have also been developed following the same structure. In 2021, the cooperation season with Belgium of Big Brother returned in the Netherlands after an absence of 14 years.

== Origins ==
=== John de Mol Jr. ===
Participants were John de Mol Jr., Patrick Scholtze, Bart Römer and his brother, Paul Römer. The idea called for a luxurious house with six contestants, closed for a year. The winner would receive 1,000,000 guilders. The working title was De Gouden Kooi (The Golden Cage) and the original concept was eventually realized as a reality show on Dutch television at the end of 2006.

The format of Big Brother was also influenced by MTV's The Real World, which began in 1992 and created the concept of putting strangers together for an extended period and recording the drama that ensued. The Real World had introduced "confessions" by housemates. Another pioneering reality format, the Swedish TV show Expedition Robinson, which first aired in 1997 (and was produced in many other countries as was Survivor) added to the Real World's template the idea of competition, in which contestants battled to remain in the series, fighting and defeating each other (in the context of the show, not physically) until only one remained.

The idea of introducing 24/7 streaming video was influenced by websites like Jennicam.org from Jennifer Ringley, a Washington resident who created it in 1997 to share her activities with Webwatchers.

In development, occupancy of the house was reduced to 100 days. An existing house was abandoned in favor of a prefabricated house. This made it possible to install "camera-cross", which allowed cameramen inside the house without being seen by the inhabitants. Originally, the idea was to produce a heavily edited weekly program, but after some experiments with the employees of the production house, the allure of slow television was discovered and the potential for a daily program was realized.

=== Direction ===
Among the series' initial directors was the future filmmaker Tom Six, who would become renowned for his body horror film The Human Centipede and its sequels.

=== Orwell lawsuit ===
George Orwell's novel Nineteen Eighty-Four, in which Big Brother is the all-seeing leader of a dystopian nation, has never been acknowledged by the producers. However, the heirs of Orwell settled an agreement with Endemol and the American TV network CBS after legal proceedings against the concept in the American version. The settlement for the lawsuit has never been publicly revealed.

=== Voyeurdorm lawsuit ===
According to a lawsuit in 2000 in a New York federal district court, Big Brother was homegrown in the United States. The idea, said the suit, came out of meetings in summer 1999 between CBS executives and Voyeurdorm.com, a Tampa, Florida adult website of eight college-aged women. These women lived, ate, slept, studied and "sunbathed naked" under 55 cameras.

=== Castaway lawsuit ===
Also in 2000, the production company Castaway, part-owned by Bob Geldof, sued Endemol for theft of format in a court in Amsterdam, saying the program was a rip-off of its Survivor-show (Expedition Robinson). A lawyer listed 12 similarities to Survivor. Endemol rejected the allegations, saying: "The genre may be the same, but the programmes are completely different, and they evolved separately. There are 20 or 30 game shows on TV and many different talk shows, but they are in the same genre, not the same programme."

=== Logo ===

The logo for Big Brother was designed to fit the housestyle of Dutch television station Veronica. The wave under both names harkens back to the time that Veronica was a pirate station, broadcasting from international waters of the Netherlands. The wave remained when Veronica left the Holland Media Groep and Big Brother was taken over by Yorin. It showed up in the logos of Big Brother all over the world. However, later versions of Dutch Big Brother at Talpa abandoned the logo and are using the eye-logo introduced with the second series of Big Brother UK.

== Ethics and debate ==
Upon the announcement of the program's format, a debate arose about its ethical acceptability. It was not known whether participants would be shown showering or on the toilet. Though both had been deemed unacceptable, only the latter still holds. Experts argued whether participants should be protected against themselves and whether participation would cause psychological or emotional damage. This discussion in Sweden after the first contestant voted off Expedition Robinson killed himself; his family reportedly blaming the rejection he felt due to being unpopular with the public.

P. van Lange, a social psychologist at the Vrije Universiteit Amsterdam pointed out the similarity to the Stanford Prison Experiment (1971). Participants in that experiment were placed in a jail, where half of them played guards and the other half prisoners. In six days, the experiment derailed. The guards became aggressive, repressive, narcissistic, and sadistic. They transformed into personalities beyond their normal selves. "From the Stanford-experiment may be concluded that human behavior is largely summoned by the local circumstances", added his colleague J. van der Pligt, professor at the Universiteit van Amsterdam. "People get carried away," said A. Bergsma of Psychologie Magazine. "Isolation becomes reality. They lose themselves in the experiment. There are no checks and balances. If there is no correction, they will derail one after another." All experts agreed that the big reward for the winner increased the chance of accidents. But not all had a negative opinion. A. Lange, a professor of clinical psychology at the Universiteit van Amsterdam indicated that the program could produce certain insights not possible to achieve any more in socio-psychological research because the psychological well-being of the participant had been given greater importance. "The design of the programme is the wet dream of a psychological researcher. Nowhere in the world an ethical commission will be found that would agree to such a design", agreed psycho-physiologist A. Gaillard of the Netherlands Organisation for Applied Scientific Research.

Once Big Brother first started scoring high ratings, the debate shifted to what this implied about the character of the Dutch, and if the sexually explicit content and terms of abuse in the program suited early broadcasting. What was considered voyeurism had now become mainstream entertainment. One explanation was that people had become more isolated and were searching for others to identify with. In this view, talking about Big Brother took the place of backbiting and scandal on the village green.

The debate in the Netherlands has died down and reality TV has become a standard of television programming. In hindsight, it nonetheless became clear that some housemates (like first season's Bart en Ruud) suffered psychological problems akin to post traumatic stress disorder.

== Series overview ==
=== Regular seasons ===
Season	Originally aired			Days	Housemates	Winner	The prize	Presenter
Season	Network	First aired	Last aired	Days	Housemates	Winner	The prize	Presenter
Big Brother 1999	Veronica	16 September 1999	31 December 1999	106	12	Bart Spring in 't Veld	ƒ250,000 (€113,445)	Rolf Wouters & Daphne Deckers
Big Brother 2000	Veronica	14 September 2000	30 December 2000	108	15	Bianca Hagenbeek	ƒ250,000 (€113,445)	Esther Duller & Beau Van Erven Doren
Big Brother 2001	Yorin	6 September 2001	30 December 2001	115	17	Sandy Boots	ƒ675,000 (€306,302)	Patty Brard
Big Brother 2002	Yorin	28 August 2002	23 December 2002	117	20	Jeanette Godefroy	€352,500	Martijn Krabbé
Big Brother 2005	Talpa	24 August 2005	22 December 2005	121	13	Joost Hoebink	€262,500	Ruud de Wild & Bridget Maasland
Big Brother 2006	Talpa	20 August 2006	27 November 2006	102	15	Jeroen Visser	€178,750	Bridget Maasland
Big Brother 2021	RTL 5	4 January 2021	8 April 2021	99	19	Jill Goede	€70,405.50	Geraldine Kemper & Peter van de Veire
Big Brother 2022	RTL 5	3 January 2022	26 March 2022	86	16	Salar Abassi Abrassi	€69,815	Geraldine Kemper & Peter van de Veire
Big Brother 2023	RTL 5	9 January 2023	1 April 2023	86	16	Bart Vandenbroek	€73,388	Geraldine Kemper & Tatyana Beloy
Big Brother 2024	RTL 5	15 January 2024	13 April 2024	93	18	Glenn Van Himst	€56,266	Geraldine Kemper & Tatyana Beloy
Big Brother 2025	RTL 5	6 January 2025	4 April 2025	92	18	Jordy de Maar	€55,500	Geraldine Kemper & Tatyana Beloy

=== VIPs seasons ===
Season	Originally aired			Days	Housemates	Winner	Presenter
Season	Network	First aired	Last aired	Days	Housemates	Winner	Presenter
Big Brother VIPs	Veronica	22 May 2000	16 June 2000	26	25	No Winner	Unknown
Hotel Big Brother	Talpa	12 January 2006	6 March 2006	54	10	No Winner	Caroline Tensen

=== Secret Story ===
Season	Originally aired			Days	Housemates	Winner	The prize	Presenter
Season	Network	First aired	Last aired	Days	Housemates	Winner	The prize	Presenter
Secret Story 2011	NET5	13 February 2011	12 May 2011	91	15	Sharon Hooijkaas	€117,050	Renate Verbaan & Bart Boonstra

== Big Brother VIPs ==
Big Brother VIPs was the first-ever of celebrity spin-off version of the original of the international reality television franchise Big Brother worldwide. The show was broadcast on Veronica from 22 May 2000 to 16 June 2000 for four weeks.

The show was pre-recorded in the Big Brother House were included four different groups of well-known Dutch celebrities known as VIPs. The VIPs of each group were only in the house for five days. There was no winner in this show.

The show could not take advantage of the hype of Big Brother 1, the ratings were significantly lower.

Week	VIPs	Age	Birthplace	Notability
1	Ad Visser	53	Amsterdam	Toppop presenter and new age artist
1	Antje Monteiro	30	Utrecht	Musical singer
1	Christine van der Horst	33	Zaandam	Presenter
1	Emile Ratelband	51	Arnhem	Positivity guru
1	Johan van der Velde	43	Rijsbergen	Former cyclist
1	Monique Sluyter	32	Sneek	TV presenter and playboy model
1	Theo van Gogh	42	The Hague	Journalist, film-director and presenter
2	Ben Cramer	53	Amsterdam	Singer and musical star
2	Désirée Manders	30	The Hague	Pop singer
2	Harry Slinger	50	Amsterdam	Pop group Drukwerk singer
2	John Blankenstein	51	De Bilt	Former professional football referee
2	Kim Holland	30	Gouda	Porn star
2	Manon Thomas	37	Emmeloord	TV presenter
3	Henk Bres	47	The Hague	The Hague "stem des volks", regular participant of TV program Het Lagerhuis
3	Isabelle Kuylenburg	20	-	One of the singing duo Double Date, known from the Nationaal Songfestival
3	Maja van den Broecke	44	Amsterdam	Actress
3	Menno Buch	48	The Hague	Erotic TV show presenter, owner of sex lines and porn websites
3	Mike Starink	29	Arnhem	TV presenter
3	Nickie Nicole	38	New York	Drag queen
4	Anneke Grönloh	54	Indonesia	Singer
4	Henk Schiffmacher	48	Harderwijk	Tattoo artist
4	Maxine	25	Emmeloord	Eurovision singer
4	Maya Eksteen	41	Amsterdam	TV presenter
4	Ronnie Tober	54	Bussum	Singer
4	Theodor Holman	47	Amsterdam	Writer and journalist

== Hotel Big Brother ==
Hotel Big Brother was the second celebrity spin-off version of the original Dutch reality television series Big Brother. The show was broadcast on Talpa from 12 January 2006 to 7 March 2006 for 55 days.

In this show, well-known Dutch celebrities were brought together to operate a hotel as a "hotelier". The proceeds of the hotel would donate to the foundation of Mappa Mondo, for children with a life-threatening illness from the Red Cross in Eindhoven. The target amount was €2,500,000, to be raised in eight weeks.

Outsiders could stay in the hotel. For this, they had to register via the website of the show. On the website, they could reserve a room in the hotel for one or more nights where it was possible that they could be seen on TV.

Each week they were joined by a new manager called Big Boss, who would be in charge. The Big Boss would stay for a week and was not part of the competition. Initially, every week a "hotelier" would be voted out by the public, but this concept was immediately abandoned after a few celebrities quit the show.

The show suffered from poor viewing figures and the Red Cross was dissatisfied with the quality delivered, but after some adjustments, which inevitably led to censored TV coverage and often logos on the streams it was nevertheless maintained.

The show ended a week earlier than planned on 7 March 2006 with the "Gala van de Glimlach van een Kind (Gala of the Smile of a Child)" many celebrities participated free of charge.

Hoteliers	Age	Notability	Duration	Status
Anita Heilker	45	Former Dolly Dots singer	Day 16–55	Exit
Bonnie St. Claire	56	Pop singer	Day 1–55	Exit
Ferri Somogyi	32	Actor	Day 21–55	Exit
Frank Awick	40	AT5 presenter	Day 1–55	Exit
John Jones	42	Comedian and actor	Day 9–55	Exit
Monique Sluyter	38	TV presenter, model and Big Brother VIPs 2000 participant	Day 1–55	Exit
Viola Holt	56	TV presenter	Day 1–55	Exit
Bart Spring in 't Veld	29	Winner of Big Brother 1999	Day 1–26	Walked
Gert Timmerman	70	Singer	Day 1–13	Walked
Kelly van der Veer	25	Big Brother 2001 housemate	Day 1–9	Walked

Big Boss

Duration	Big Boss	Notability
Day 1–9	Micky Hoogendijk	Actress
Day 9–19	Henk Krol	Gay movement leader and Gay Krant editor-in-chief
Day 19–27	Chiel van Praag	Record producer
Day 27–33	Theo Nabuurs	Party organizer and one of the DJ duo Mental Theo
Day 33–40	Annelies Fleers	Magazine maker
Day 40–47	Mieke Vogelpoel	Mental coach
Day 47–55	Wilma Nanninga	Tabloid journalist

Guest

Duration	Big Boss	Notability
Day 10	Joost Hoebink	Winner of Big Brother 2005

== See also ==
- The Golden Cage
