= Jaap Amesz =

Dutch television personality

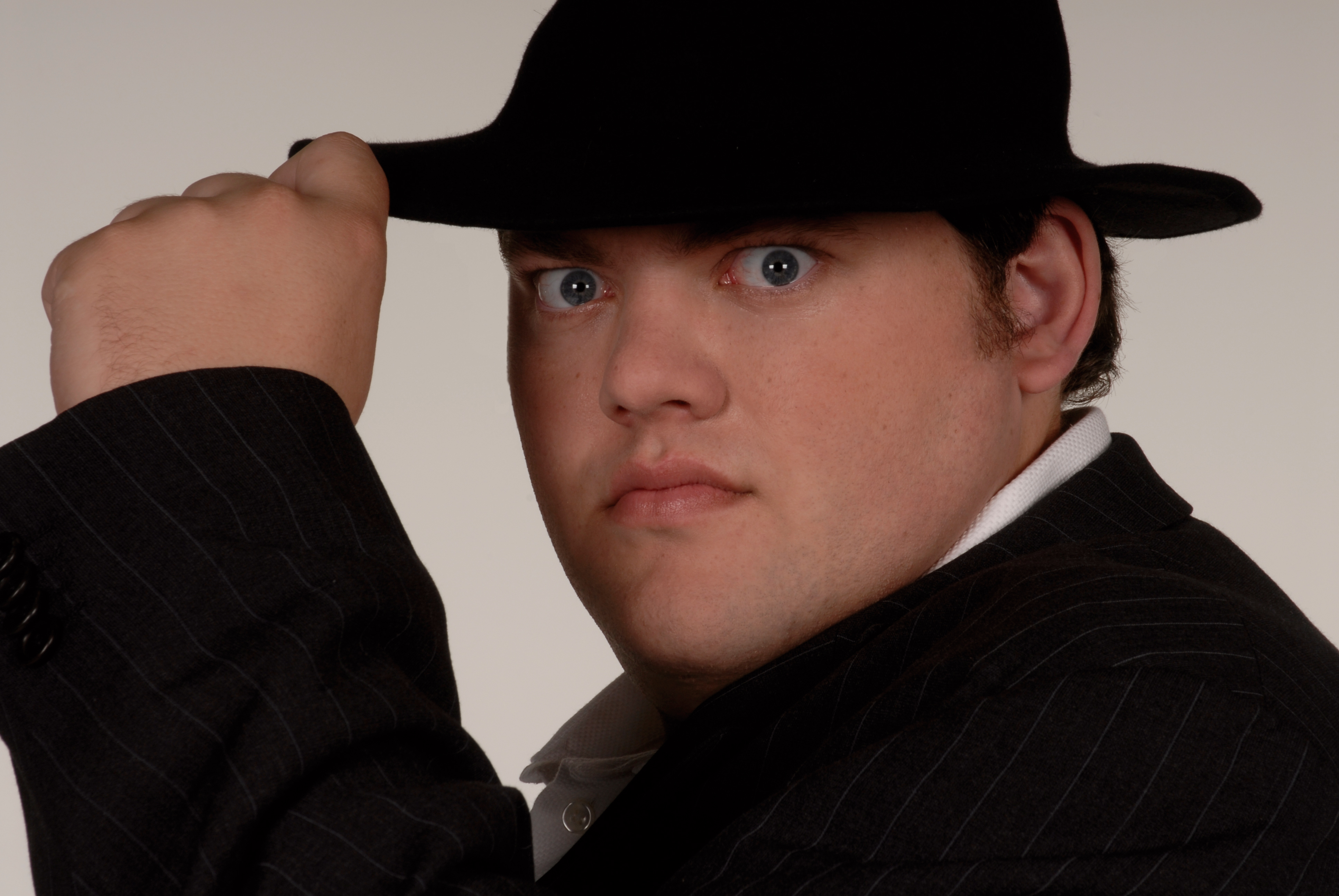
- Born: 6 September 1982 (age 43); Netherlands
- Other names: King Jaap, Terror Jaap
- Occupation: Television personality
- Website: http://www.terrorjaap.nl/

Jaap Amesz (born 6 September 1982 in Brielle) is a Dutch television personality. He gained fame as the first winner in 2008, of the Dutch reality television series The Golden Cage, the successor to Big Brother, where he became known as Terror Jaap. In a final competition of the series presented by Bridget Maasland and Rutger Castricum, he won the amount of €1.35 million euros.

Before Amesz joined the Golden Cage, he studied human resource management at the Rotterdam School of Management at Erasmus University Rotterdam. Jaap is an enthusiastic chess player and once defeated grandmaster Jan Werle. He currently has a FIDE rating of 2222.

Amesz developed his own Terror Jaap show that was broadcast on RTL 5, for which he sought unusual guests such as pornographic actors and anorexia patients. In March 2010, Amesz used a lie detector during an interview with Joran van der Sloot, a suspect in the Natalee Holloway case. After a brief investigation, the Aruban public prosecutor concluded that his statement was not true because the facts and timelines were inconsistent. On 4 June 2010, Dutch authorities raided the home of Amesz and confiscated evidence at the request of the U.S. Justice Department, who were investigating Van der Sloot on charges of extortion and wire fraud.
