= Big Brother (Dutch TV series) season 6 =

Big Brother
- Season 6
- Presented by: Bridget Maasland
- No. of days: 102
- No. of housemates: 15
- Winner: Jeroen Visser
- Runner-up: Sabrina Mutsers

Release
- Original network: Talpa
- Original release: 20 August – 27 November 2006

Additional information
- Filming dates: 18 August – 27 November 2006

Season chronology
- ← Previous; Season 5

Big Brother 2006 was the sixth season of the Dutch version of Big Brother. It lasted from 18 August 2006 to 27 November 2006 for a total of 102 days. The presenter was Bridget Maasland.

== Overview ==
Though the show launched on 18 August 2006, it did not start airing on television until two days later. Viewing numbers were half of that of the previous season which was largely caused by competition from a similar show The Golden Cage, broadcast immediately after Big Brother.

The season added an extra twist to the game, where most of the housemates had a partner who entered the house with them. Another added twist this season was the red phone. Every housemate had a safe deposit account of €30,000. When half was left(meaning one member of the pair had been evicted), the other half had to be donated to other housemates' safe. The winner was left with the amount accumulated. Two "jokers" (exemptions) were sold by auction. Marlies and Tijn won them for €25,300 and €29,200.

== Housemates ==
Name	Age on entry	Hometown	Occupation	Relationship	Day entered	Day exited	Result
Jeroen Visser	23	Werkendam	Account Manager	-	1	102	Winner
Sabrina Mutsers	27	Den Haag	Housewife	Monique's sister	1	102	Runner-up
Rik Rovers	22	's-Hertogenbosch	Hairdresser	Tijn's brother	1	102	3rd Place
Tijn Rovers	24	St-Oedenrode	Salesman	Rik's brother	1	102	4th Place
Monique de Roo	35	Den Haag	Part-time receptionists & Fitness instructor	Sabrina's sister	1	95	Evicted
Semih Turan	26	Rotterdam	Art Director	Micheline's boyfriend	1	88	Evicted
Marcia Schouten	22	Amsterdam	Student	Egbert's daughter	1	81	Evicted
Marlies Otten	26	Amsterdam	Manager	-	1	74	Evicted
Micheline de Reus	20	Rotterdam	Intranet/Internet content manager	Semih's girlfriend	1	67	Evicted
Etiënne Meulhof	18	Zwolle	Student	Marcel's son	1	60	Evicted
Egbert Schouten	45	Abbekerk	Group leader of youth detention center	Marcia's father	1	53	Evicted
Janine Holder	31	Amsterdam	Model	-	1	46	Evicted
Milica IJpelaar	23	's-Hertogenbosch	Travelling saleswomen	Hilde's daughter	1	39	Evicted
Hilde IJpelaar	42	Drunen	Housewife	Milica's mother	1	32	Evicted
Marcel Meulhof	45	Zwolle	Hotel Manager	Etiënne's father	1	25	Evicted

== Summary ==
Two of the cast members, Jeroen and Milica arrived one day early and had to pretend to be a couple. Milica's mother Hilde entered a day after most of the group. The first time, the red phone rang Egbert answered it and heard the message that the viewers would decide whether he would stay. One day later he was allowed to stay with 75% of the public vote. Jeroen, Hilde, Milica, Etiënne and Marcel formed a well-known click in the house. When Egbert dropped his key into a hole in the floor, he had to survive in an inflatable canoe in the swimming pool for two days to get it back. Big Brother nominated Semih and Marlies for a minor rule-breaking but this was annulled and Etiënne and Marcel were nominated instead for talking about their nomination strategy. Marcel was the first housemate to be evicted and donated half of the money to his son. Soon after, Monique's husband rushed to the house when it looked like her Tijn was getting close. After they wrote a few letters to each other she decided to stay. Afterward, Monique and Sabrina were given a private bedroom since Tijn and Etiënne wouldn't leave them alone at night. In the second round, Hilde and Etiënne were nominated, the latter because of his racist comments. The red telephone rang again and Semih heard that he would be nominated for four consecutive weeks. Marlies used her joker to put Janine up for nominations in her place. A week later, Egbert, Jeroen and Semih were nominated. During Egbert's eviction host Bridget told Egbert and Jeroen that they both had both been evicted because they had the same percentage of votes. However, Jeroen wasn't really evicted since for a secret mission Monique and Sabrina had to hide Jeroen in their private bedroom for a couple of days. They passed their mission, and all three gained immunity from the next eviction. Marlies was nominated after Sabrina used a joker she bought from Jeroen to put Marlies up for eviction in her place. The winner of the sixth season was the soccer player Jeroen.

Due to the disappointing ratings of this season, Big Brother was canceled in the Netherlands for the second time.

== Nominations table ==
	Week 2	Week 3	Week 4	Week 5	Week 6	Week 7	Week 8	Week 9	Week 10	Week 11	Week 12	Week 13	Week 14 Final		Nominations received
Jeroen	No; Nominations	Micheline	Tijn	Tijn	Marlies	Rik	Tijn	Marlies	Marcia	Tijn	Rik	Monique	Winner (Day 102)		25
Sabrina	No; Nominations	Hilde	Hilde	Milica	Marcia	Egbert	Marcia	Marcia	Marcia	Marcia	Semih	Jeroen	Runner-up (Day 102)		4
Rik	No; Nominations	Jeroen	Etiënne	Jeroen	Jeroen	Jeroen	Marcia	Jeroen	Jeroen	Jeroen	Jeroen	Jeroen	Third place (Day 102)		2
Tijn	No; Nominations	Jeroen	Milica	Jeroen	Marlies	Jeroen	Marlies	Micheline	Semih	Semih	Semih	Jeroen	Fourth place (Day 102)		11
Monique	No; Nominations	Hilde	Hilde	Milica	Jeroen	Egbert	Marcia	Marcia	Marcia	Marcia	Jeroen	Jeroen	Evicted (Day 95)		4
Semih	No; Nominations	Hilde	Hilde	Milica	Marlies	Egbert	Tijn	Tijn	Tijn	Tijn	Tijn	Evicted (Day 88)			4
Marcia	No; Nominations	Milica	Etiënne	Milica	Jeroen	Sabrina	Sabrina	Jeroen	Sabrina	Monique	Evicted (Day 81)				11
Marlies	No; Nominations	Jeroen	Etiënne	Jeroen	Jeroen	Egbert	Etiënne	Jeroen	Sabrina	Evicted (Day 74)					9
Micheline	No; Nominations	Hilde	Etiënne	Milica	Jeroen	Egbert	Etiënne	Tijn	Evicted (Day 67)						7
Etiënne	No; Nominations	Micheline	Egbert	Tijn	Marlies	Egbert	Marlies	Evicted (Day 60)							10
Egbert	Nominated	Hilde	Etiënne	Etiënne	Marlies	Etiënne	Evicted (Day 53)								7
Janine	No; Nominations	Micheline	Etiënne	Jeroen	Marlies	Evicted (Day 46)									0
Milica	No; Nominations	Micheline	Monique	Tijn	Evicted (Day 39)										7
Hilde	No; Nominations	Micheline	Monique	Evicted (Day 32)											8
Marcel	No; Nominations	Micheline	Evicted (Day 25)												N/A
Notes	1	2	none		3, 4	none	5	6, 7	8	none			9		
Nominated	Egbert	Etiënne, Hilde, Marcel, Micheline	Etiënne, Hilde	Jeroen, Milica	Janine, Jeroen, Semih	Egbert, Jeroen, Semih	Entienne, Marcia, Semih	Jeroen, Marcia, Micheline, Semih	Marcia, Marlies	Marcia, Tijn	Jeroen, Semih	Jeroen, Monique	Jeroen, Rik, Sabrina, Tijn		
Evicted	Egbert; 75% to stay	Marcel; 12% to save	Hilde; 36% to save	Milica; 46% to save	Janine; 22% to save	Egbert; 23% to save	Etiënne; 32% to save	Micheline; 13% to save	Marlies; 34% to save	Marcia; 43% to save	Semih; 40% to save	Monique; 43% to save	Tijn; 8% (out of 4)	Rik; 17% (out of 3)	
Evicted	Egbert; 75% to stay	Marcel; 12% to save	Hilde; 36% to save	Milica; 46% to save	Janine; 22% to save	Egbert; 23% to save	Etiënne; 32% to save	Micheline; 13% to save	Marlies; 34% to save	Marcia; 43% to save	Semih; 40% to save	Monique; 43% to save	Sabrina; 41% (out of 2)	Jeroen; 59% to win	

=== Notes ===
- ^Note 1: On Day 10, Egbert was nominated for eviction by Big Brother for answering the Red Phone. As he was the only nominee, the public had to decide if he should be evicted or if he should stay.
- ^Note 2: On Day 2, both Marlies and Semih were told that they had been automatically nominated by Big Brother. This, however, was a lie, and they were actually immune from eviction. Etiënne and Marcel were automatically nominated by Big Brother as punishment for discussing nominations.
- ^Note 3: Marlies was initially up for eviction, but she used the Nominations Joker she won on Day 2 to save herself from nomination and she nominated Janine in her place.
- ^Note 4: On Day 39, the Red Phone rang and Semih answered it. When he answered the phone Big Brother informed Semih that he would be nominated for the next four evictions.
- ^Note 5: As everyone in the House besides Monique and Sabrina thought Jeroen was evicted, he could not be nominated this week.
- ^Note 6: Last week, Jeroen was fake evicted, and Monique and Sabrina had to hide him in their bedroom without the other Housemates knowing. As they successfully passed this secret mission, Monique and Sabrina were immune from being nominated this week.
- ^Note 7: Tijn used the Nominations Joker to save himself and he nominated Micheline in his place.
- ^Note 8: On Day 67, Jeroen opened an envelope that said he had won a Nominations Joker. Following the announcement of the nominations, Sabrina brought the Joker off Jeroen for €25,000. Sabrina used the Joker to save herself and nominated Marlies in her place.
- ^Note 9: The public was voting for who they wanted to see win instead of who they wanted to stay.
