= Neuken doe je zo! =

- Also known as: Neuken doe je zo!
- Genre: Sex education
- Presented by: Bridget Maasland
- Country of origin: Netherlands
- Original language: Dutch
- No. of episodes: 7 + 2 summer specials

Production
- Producer: BNN

Original release
- Network: Nederland 2 (via BNN)

Neuken doe je zo! (That's How You Fuck) was an explicit sex education programme produced by the Dutch BNN (at the time on Nederland 2) between February and April 2003. The program provided sex education in an easy-to-understand way and in a language that is close to young people. It was presented by then BNN presenter Bridget Maasland, who was accompanied by two inflatable dolls, costing €4,000.

The programme caused a lot of controversy, especially from conservative politicians and women's groups. BNN ironized the claims.

== Format ==
The program had a fixed structure:

1. Erotic model Bo uses naked dolls to explain how to masturbate or use contraceptives, for example.
2. Bridget talks to young people about a theme. The following will be discussed: what is your (practical) experience in that area? and how do you feel about it? This always took place in the so-called Neuken doe je zo! caravan that was driven to a different secondary school every week. This section always ends with some results from the BNN sex survey, for example how many young people ever cheat.
3. A report on the subject, in which Bridget consults an expert or professional on location. One episode visited the Hanky Panky School in Amsterdam.
4. A piece of cabaret by the female cabaret duo De Bloeiende Maagden.

Between parts, Bridget announces the next part or episode from the studio (nothing more than a chair and a white background).

== Episodes ==
Number	Airdate	Bo	Caravan	Report	De Bloeiende Maagden
1	24 February 2003	Masturbation	Seduction	cyberbox	1. Ham & mayonaise
2	3 March 2003	Birth control	Defloration	hymen	2. Seks in de ruimte
3	10 March 2003	Blow jobs and oral sex	Orgasms	penis	3. Over tijd ...
4	17 March 2003	Sex position	Sex position	Porno movies	4. Echte liefde
5	24 March 2003	Sex toys	Safe sex and STDs	piercing	5. Safe sekx
6	31 March 2003	Anal sex	Extramarital sex	escortschool	6. 25 jaar later
7	7 April 2003	Handjob	SOA	paaldansacademie	?

== Neuken doe je zomers! ==
Two episodes of Neuken doe je zomers! (That's How You Fuck in the Summer) were broadcast at the beginning of September 2003. These episodes were mainly about how young people deal with sex on holidays. BNN followed several groups of young people on holidays to see how things were going.
