= Big Brother (Dutch TV series) season 3 =

Big Brother
- Season 3
- Presented by: Patty Brard
- No. of days: 114
- No. of housemates: 17
- Winner: Sandy Boots
- Runner-up: Daniëlle van der Kuij

Release
- Original network: Yorin
- Original release: 6 September – 30 December 2001

Season chronology
- ← Previous; Season 2 Next → Season 4

Big Brother 2001 also known as Big Brother: The Battle, was the third season of the Dutch version of Big Brother. It was broadcast by the new station Yorin. It lasted from 6 September to 30 December 2001 for a total of 114 days. The presenter was Patty Brard, the member of girl group Luv'.

== Format ==
The format underwent some changes. Contrary to the former seasons, the viewers were only able to vote for their favorite nominee, and not for the one they wanted to leave. This system was introduced to prevent the most controversial housemates from being evicted first.

The housemates were divided into two permanent groups. One group lived in a luxurious part of the house, the other group lived in poverty. At unexpected times a battle was announced, in which the two groups could fight for the right to live on the rich half. Each group had a Captain with special duties and privileges. At any moment each participant was free to challenge his leader in a Captains-battle.

== Housemates ==
Name	Age on entry	Hometown	Occupation	Day entered	Day exited	Result
Sandy Boots	23	Hoogwoud	Unemployed	27	114	Winner
Daniëlle van der Kuij	27	Amsterdam	Nurse	13	114	Runner-up
Gert-Jan de Boer	33	Amsterdam	Communication Consultant	1	114	3rd Place
Andries de Jong	24	Drachten	Communications Teacher	1	114	4th Place
Leo van Veenendaal	36	Utrecht	Social Worker	34	111	Evicted
Diane Hendriks	32	Haarlem	Receptionist	1	104	Evicted
Kelly van der Veer	21	Hilversum	Telephone operator	1	97	Evicted
Ed Veter	22	Amsterdam	-	34	90	Evicted
Pascal van Lingen	23	Rijswijk	Cook	13	83	Evicted
Coos van Haaften	34	Bergschenhoek	Account Manager	20	76	Evicted
Frank Kloppert	35	Rotterdam	Network system manager	1	69	Evicted
Priscella Ahlers	22	Roswinkel	Student	41	62	Evicted
Tania de Maer	38	Vught / Hasselt	Event organizer	41	48	Evicted
Audrey	28	Almere	Writer	27	34	Evicted
Richard Oosterhuis	27	Deventer	Sales Manager	20	27	Evicted
Nancy van der Beek	25	Zoetermeer	Sales Manager	13	20	Evicted
Aldrico Amando	38	Curaçao / Amsterdam	Choreographer	1	5	Walked
Ellen	Disqualified from the Spanish villa before entered the Big Brother house					

== Summary ==
The season started with only six housemates. The others were secluded in a villa in Spain and were only gradually introduced. Each new twosome started with a battle to determine which group they became part of. In Spain, where there were no cameras, a relationship developed between Nancy and Richard. But when Richard finally arrived in Almere, Nancy was voted out at the same time. Another contestant never made it to the real house at all. Ellen was removed from the Spanish villa because she had made disallowed telephonic contact with the outside world. Rumor said she had gained possession of the telephone by having sex with a security guard.

The first week the occupants were only visible on streaming video. The producers thought that it would be prudent to start the television broadcast in the second week, so they could save up interesting material for a jump start. But they were wrong. During that first week 9/11 happened in the United States. Because of the magnitude of the event, the housemates were informed. Antillian Aldrico, who had many friends in New York City, took the news badly and had to be removed after he started to behave confused. On the other hand, some housemates for a while had the feeling the event was not real. Even after they received newspapers and saw images, they thought they were the victim of a very cruel joke.

The outspoken personalities of this season yielded much viewing-pleasure but also many complaints about the high content of swearing, boozing and sex. Young teacher Andries ended up in bed with the transsexual Kelly, snogged with Audrey and had a sexual relationship with Diane. Before that, a very drunken Diane had forced sex with Frank. Streamwatchers who were witnesses to the event filed a complaint. However, neither the Ministry of Justice nor Big Brother took action. Housemate Gert-Jan gathered a big fanbase after he had been much maligned by the manipulative Coos and Pascal and had proposed to his girlfriend in the outside world.

The final battles, in which the last contestants had to collect the prize money, were copied from Fear Factor (another Endemol production). The lesbian beauty Sandy won the last popularity vote. Inspired by Kelly, she later used the money to pay for breast implants for her girlfriend and herself. Kelly gained a photoshoot in Playboy in which she could show off her newly gained femininity.

== Nominations table ==
	Week 3	Week 4	Week 5	Week 7	Week 9	Week 10	Week 11	Week 12	Week 13	Week 14	Week 15	Week 16	Week 17 Final		Nominations received
Sandy	Not in House		No; Nominations	No; Nominations	Coos	Coos	Coos	Pascal	Gert-Jan	Gert-Jan	Andries	Andries	Winner (Day 114)		3
Daniëlle	No; Nominations	No; Nominations	No; Nominations	No; Nominations	Priscella	Frank	Leo	Leo	Ed	Andries	Gert-Jan	Leo	Runner-up (Day 114)		4
Gert-Jan	No; Nominations	No; Nominations	No; Nominations	No; Nominations	Coos	Coos	Pascal	Pascal	Kelly	Kelly	Diane	Andries	Third place (Day 114)		7
Andries	No; Nominations	No; Nominations	No; Nominations	No; Nominations	Priscella	Frank	Leo	Leo	Ed	Daniëlle	Sandy	Sandy	Fourth place (Day 114)		5
Leo	Not in House			No; Nominations	Priscella	Frank	Daniëlle	Diane	Kelly	Kelly	Diane	Andries	Evicted (Day 111)		11
Diane	No; Nominations	No; Nominations	No; Nominations	No; Nominations	Priscella	Leo	Leo	Ed	Ed	Daniëlle	Sandy	Evicted (Day 104)			5
Kelly	No; Nominations	No; Nominations	No; Nominations	No; Nominations	Pascal	Pascal	Coos	Pascal	Gert-Jan	Leo	Evicted (Day 97)				9
Ed	Not in House			No; Nominations	Coos	Kelly	Daniëlle	Diane	Diane	Evicted (Day 90)					4
Pascal	No; Nominations	No; Nominations	No; Nominations	No; Nominations	Kelly	Kelly	Gert-Jan	Gert-Jan	Evicted (Day 83)						6
Coos	Not in House	No; Nominations	No; Nominations	No; Nominations	Kelly	Kelly	Gert-Jan	Evicted (Day 76)							7
Frank	No; Nominations	No; Nominations	No; Nominations	No; Nominations	Leo	Leo	Evicted (Day 69)								3
Priscella	Not in House			No nominations	Leo	Evicted (Day 62)									4
Tania	Not in House			No nominations	Evicted (Day 48)										N/A
Audrey	Not in House		No nominations	Evicted (Day 34)											N/A
Richard	Not in House	No nominations	Evicted (Day 27)												N/A
Nancy	No nominations	Evicted (Day 20)													N/A
Aldrico	Walked (Day 5)														N/A
Nomination notes	1				2		2, 3	2, 4	2, 5	2	none		6		
Nominated For Eviction	Andries, Daniëlle, Diane, Frank, Gert-Jan, Kelly, Nancy, Pascal	Andries, Coos, Daniëlle, Diane, Frank, Gert-Jan, Kelly, Pascal, Richard	Andries, Audrey, Coos, Daniëlle, Diane, Frank, Gert-Jan, Kelly, Pascal, Sandy	Andries, Coos, Daniëlle, Diane, Ed, Frank, Gert-Jan, Kelly, Leo, Pascal, Priscella, Sandy, Tania	Priscella, Coos	Frank, Kelly	Coos, Leo	Diane, Pascal	Ed, Gert-Jan	Daniëlle, Kelly	Diane, Sandy	Andries, Leo, Sandy	Andries, Daniëlle, Gert-Jan, Sandy		
Walked	Aldrico	none													
Evicted	Nancy; 3.0% to save	Richard; 3.1% to save	Audrey; 3.4% to save	Tania; 1.3% to save	Priscella; 47.7% to save	Frank; 43.2% to save	Coos; 19.6% to save	Pascal; 37.5% to save	Ed; 14.1% to save	Kelly; 19.9% to save	Diane; 18.4% to save	Leo; 14.1% to save	Andries; 4.3% to win	Daniëlle; 38.9% to win	
Evicted	Nancy; 3.0% to save	Richard; 3.1% to save	Audrey; 3.4% to save	Tania; 1.3% to save	Priscella; 47.7% to save	Frank; 43.2% to save	Coos; 19.6% to save	Pascal; 37.5% to save	Ed; 14.1% to save	Kelly; 19.9% to save	Diane; 18.4% to save	Leo; 14.1% to save	Gert-Jan; 16.0% to win	Sandy; 40.8% to win	

=== Notes ===
- ^Note 1: For the first 4 evictions, the Housemates did not nominate. All Housemates automatically faced the public vote, with 2 new housemates entering the house when one was evicted. The exception to this was when 4 new housemates entered following Audrey's eviction in Week 5.
- ^Note 2: Starting with Week 9's nominations, housemates nominated in teams. Housemates could only nominate someone else from their team with each team having one person face the public vote. The teams were disbanded following Kelly's eviction on Day 97.
- ^Note 3: In Week 11, Leo, as captain of the red team, was forced to cast the tie-breaker nomination against the blue team. Leo nominated Coos.
- ^Note 4: In Week 12, Sandy, as captain of the blue team, was forced to cast the tie-breaker nomination against the red team. Sandy nominated Diane.
- ^Note 5: In Week 13, Andries, as captain of the red team, was forced to cast the tie-breaker nomination against the blue team. Andries nominated Gert-Jan.
- ^Note 6: This week, the public voting were voting for a winner.
