= Big Brother (Dutch TV series) season 5 =

Big Brother
- Season 5
- Screenshot of the logo from the show
- Presented by: Ruud de Wild & Bridget Maasland
- No. of days: 121
- No. of housemates: 13
- Winner: Joost Hoebink
- Runner-up: Roeland "Roel" Dietvorst

Release
- Original network: Talpa
- Original release: 24 August – 22 December 2005

Season chronology
- ← Previous; Season 4 Next → Season 6

Big Brother 2005 was the fifth season of the Dutch version of Big Brother. Three years after its initial cancellation, Big Brother was brought back. John de Mol Jr. decided to air it on his own TV station Talpa. Although he did not own the rights anymore after he left Endemol. It lasted from 24 August to 22 December 2005 for a total of 121 days.

The season was shown with moderate success in the early evening. The house had moved from Almere to Aalsmeer, and the presenters were Bridget Maasland and Ruud de Wild.

The theme for this season was Secrecy. Housemates entered with a secret that they weren't allowed to reveal to other housemates. Aside from usual weekly tasks, the housemates received secret missions to spark distrust and conflicts. Some gained cash which they had to hide from the other housemates.

== Housemates ==
| Name | Age on entry | Hometown | Occupation | Day entered | Day exited | Result |
|---|---|---|---|---|---|---|
| Joost Hoebink | 21 | Nijmegen | Banker | 1 | 121 | Winner |
| Roeland "Roel" Dietvorst | 27 | Rotterdam | Student | 1 | 121 | Runner-up |
| Lieske Stokkers | 19 | Groningen | Student | 1 | 121 | 3rd Place |
| Ingrid Hofland | 25 | Brunssum | Sports entertainer | 1 | 121 | Walked (with €37,500) |
| Nathalie Malherbe | 27 | Rotterdam | Account Manager | 1 | 114 | Evicted |
| Dido van Kuijk | 23 | Heemstede | Elderly person carer | 1 | 107 | Evicted |
| Rob van Nood | 45 | Nigtevecht | Entrepreneur | 1 | 100 | Evicted |
| Chantal Braspenning | 41 | Amsterdam | Secretary | 1 | 93 | Evicted |
| Menno Liebregts | 25 | Breda | Student | 1 | 79 | Evicted |
| Tanja Slangenberg | 27 | Groningen | Unemployed | 1 | 65 | Walked |
| Linda Rijsdijk | 26 | Roosendaal | Barman | 1 | 51 | Evicted |
| Ralph van der Velt | 31 | Rijswijk | Fireman / Nathalie's ex-partner | 2 | 37 | Evicted |
| Rikkert van Bergen | 27 | Tilburg | Student | 1 | 23 | Evicted |

== Summary ==
The season was dominated by the relationship between Dido and Roel, who shared his bed with Lieske and Linda as well. The season borrowed elements from foreign series, like the introduction of Nathalie s ex-boyfriend. However, most attention was directed at Tanja, who was seven months pregnant. Tanja could be evicted before the baby would be born. Tanja's smoking during pregnancy was debated in the media, as well as the role of the father who didn't want any responsibility but enjoyed his fame.

On 18 October 2005, Tanja gave birth to her daughter Joscelyn Savanna in front of the cameras, it's a Big Brother first. Because of limitations by the Dutch Labour Inspectorate, the baby wasn't allowed to be shown for extended periods. Tanja voluntary left with her daughter on Day 65 as she felt she was being poorly treated by her fellow housemates.

Towards the end of the season, producers were accused of tampering with the results of the SMS-and telephone votes during eviction rounds. A campaign by third season housemate Gert-Jan de Boer called for the attendance of a Notary at least during the finals, and Endemol gave in. In the end, the winner of the season was Joost.

== Nominations table ==
| | Week 1 | Week 3 | Week 5 | Week 7 | Week 9 | Week 11 | Week 13 | Week 14 | | Week 15 | Week 16 | Week 17 Final | | Nominations received |
| | Week 1 | Week 3 | Week 5 | Week 7 | Week 9 | Week 11 | Week 13 | Round 1 | Round 2 | Week 15 | Week 16 | Week 17 Final | | Nominations received |
|---|---|---|---|---|---|---|---|---|---|---|---|---|---|---|
| Joost | No; Nominations | Ralph | Ralph | Roel | Tanja | Roel | Roel | Lieske | Roel | Lieske | Exempt | Winner (Day 121) | | 3 |
| Roel | No; Nominations | Linda | Linda | Menno | Joost | Menno | Joost | Lieske | Joost | Lieske | Nathalie | Runner-up (Day 121) | | 7 |
| Lieske | No; Nominations | Ralph | Ralph | Linda | Chantal | Dido | Roel | Roel | Dido | Nathalie | Ingrid | Third place (Day 121) | | 22 |
| Ingrid | No; Nominations | Lieske | Lieske | Rob | Tanja | Dido | Dido | Lieske | Nathalie | Dido | Lieske | Walked (Day 121) | | 3 |
| Nathalie | No; Nominations | Ralph | Ralph | Tanja | Menno | Menno | Lieske | Lieske | Rob | Lieske | Roel | Evicted (Day 114) | | 3 |
| Dido | No; Nominations | Rikkert | Lieske | Linda | Ingrid | Menno | Chantal | Lieske | Rob | Lieske | Evicted (Day 107) | | | 8 |
| Rob | No; Nominations | Ralph | Menno | Menno | Menno | Menno | Ingrid | Lieske | Dido | Evicted (Day 100) | | | | 8 |
| Chantal | No; Nominations | Ralph | Lieske | Lieske | Menno | Dido | Dido | Evicted (Day 93) | | | | | | 2 |
| Menno | No; Nominations | Ralph | Lieske | Rob | Rob | Rob | Evicted (Day 79) | | | | | | | 12 |
| Tanja | No; Nominations | Lieske | Lieske | Rob | Rob | Walked (Day 65) | | | | | | | | 4 |
| Linda | No; Nominations | Lieske | Lieske | Tanja | Evicted (Day 51) | | | | | | | | | 4 |
| Ralph | Rob | Menno | Menno | Evicted (Day 37) | | | | | | | | | | 10 |
| Rikkert | No; Nominations | Ralph | Roel | Evicted (Day 23) | | | | | | | | | | 1 |
| Notes | 1 | 2 | 3 | 4 | 5, 6 | none | 7 | 8 | | 9 | none | 10 | | |
| Nominated | none | ~~Lieske,~~; Linda, Menno, Ralph, Rikkert | Lieske, Ralph, Roel | Linda, ~~Menno,~~; Rob, Tanja | Menno, Nathalie, Rob, Tanja | Dido, Menno, Rob, Roel | Chantal, Dido, Ingrid, Lieske, Nathalie, Roel | Lieske, Roel | Dido, Lieske, Rob, Roel | Dido, Joost, Lieske, Nathalie | Ingrid, Lieske, Nathalie, Roel | Joost, Lieske, Roel | | |
| Nominated | none | ~~Lieske,~~; Linda, Menno, Ralph, Rikkert | Lieske, Ralph, Roel | Linda, ~~Menno,~~; Rob, Tanja | Rob | Dido, Menno, Rob, Roel | Chantal, Dido, Ingrid, Lieske, Nathalie, Roel | Lieske, Roel | Dido, Lieske, Rob, Roel | Dido, Joost, Lieske, Nathalie | Ingrid, Lieske, Nathalie, Roel | Joost, Lieske, Roel | | |
| Walked | none | | | | Tanja | none | | | | | | Ingrid (with €37,500) | | |
| Evicted | Rob; Ralph's choice to fake evict | Rikkert; 16% to save | Ralph; 26% to save | Linda; 28% to save | Rob; 27% to save | Menno; 21% to save | Chantal; 14% to save | Rob; 23% to save | | Dido; 21% to save | Nathalie; 21% to save | Lieske; 14.1% (out of 3) | Roel; 49% (out of 2) | |
| Evicted | Rob; Ralph's choice to fake evict | Rikkert; 16% to save | Ralph; 26% to save | Linda; 28% to save | Rob; 51% to stay | Menno; 21% to save | Chantal; 14% to save | Rob; 23% to save | | Dido; 21% to save | Nathalie; 21% to save | Lieske; 14.1% (out of 3) | Roel; 49% (out of 2) | |
| Saved | none | Linda; 27% Menno; 28% Ralph; 29% | Roel; 36% Lieske; 38% | Rob; 30% Tanja; 42% | Menno; 29% Nathalie; 44% | Dido; 22% Rob; 28% Roel; 29% | Nathalie; 15% Roel; 16% Lieske; 17% Dido; 18% Ingrid; 20% | Lieske; 25% Dido; 25% Roel; 27% | | Nathalie; 24% Leiske; 26% Joost; 29% | Leiske; 24% Ingrid; 25% Roel; 30% | Joost; 51% to win | | |
| Saved | none | Linda; 27% Menno; 28% Ralph; 29% | Roel; 36% Lieske; 38% | Rob; 30% Tanja; 42% | Rob; 49% | Dido; 22% Rob; 28% Roel; 29% | Nathalie; 15% Roel; 16% Lieske; 17% Dido; 18% Ingrid; 20% | Lieske; 25% Dido; 25% Roel; 27% | | Nathalie; 24% Leiske; 26% Joost; 29% | Leiske; 24% Ingrid; 25% Roel; 30% | Joost; 51% to win | | |

=== Notes ===
- ^Note 1: When Ralph entered the house on Day 2, he came with an envelope which he had to give to one of his housemates. Ralph was not informed of the contents of the envelope. He chose to give the envelope to Rob, and whilst the other housemates thought Rob to be evicted, he was actually watching his other housemates from a secret room. Rob returned to the main house on Day 5.
- ^Note 2: Big Brother put an envelope in the house following nominations, whoever opened the envelope would be given immunity. Since Lieske opened the envelope she was no longer nominated for eviction and became immune for the week.
- ^Note 3: Rikkert, who was evicted last week, could choose another housemate to be up for eviction and he chose Roel.
- ^Note 4: Menno was initially nominated, but later received immunity.
- ^Note 5: Big Brother asked one housemate to open an envelope, Tanja decided to open it and therefore had to choose a housemate that would also be up for eviction, she chose Nathalie.
- ^Note 6: Following Tanja's voluntary exit, producers decided to go through with the eviction. Rob was evicted with 27% to save, but the public was given the choice to vote to keep him in the house as Tanja's replacement. The public voted for him to stay.
- ^Note 7: Evicted housemate Menno had to deduct 1 point from someone's score and was able to nominate someone himself. He deducted a point from Joost and gave a nomination point to Nathalie.
- ^Note 8: Housemates had to nominate a second person this time as only 2 housemates were nominated from their first choices. Lieske and Roel could not be nominated in the second round of nominations because they already faced the public vote from the first round.
- ^Note 9: Following Rob's eviction, Big Brother informed the housemates that if one of them volunteered to be nominated and survived the vote, they would be exempt from all future votes and would be guaranteed a place in the final. Joost accepted the offer.
- ^Note 10: Housemates were offered the chance for one of them to leave the house for a sum of money taken from the prize fund. The decision had to be unanimous. The decision was made and Ingrid left the house with €37,500.
