= Big Brother (Dutch TV series) season 4 =

Big Brother
- Season 4
- Presented by: Martijn Krabbé
- No. of days: 118
- No. of housemates: 20
- Winner: Jeanette Godefroy
- Runner-up: Margriet Post

Release
- Original network: Yorin
- Original release: 28 August – 23 December 2002

Season chronology
- ← Previous; Season 3 Next → Season 5

Big Brother 2002 was the fourth season of the Dutch version of Big Brother. Like the third season, the show was broadcast by Yorin again. It lasted from 28 August to 23 December 2002 for a total of 118 days. The presenter was Martijn Krabbé, the son of Jeroen Krabbé, psychologist Dr. Steven Pont as the commentator.

== Development ==
This season the house was again divided into a rich area (the Bungalow) and a poor area (the Bunker).

Unlike season 3, allotment to either side depended on individual tasks, confrontations and dilemmas. As before, some of the housemates were kept in seclusion for a while, this time around in Portugal. All participants were relatively young, and selected upon their single status.

As planned, this led to several relationships from which the one between Arthur and Ursula endured for the longest time. Stefan, working in the porn business, didn't manage to choose between former Jehovah's witness Daniela, Geesje and Margriet. This wasn't very much appreciated by the girls. Dutch Moroccan Mustapha ('Mushi') put his stamp on the program by insisting on observing Ramadan. Despite this, Mushi was involved in various rude arguments with the emancipated Margriet and the Fortuynist Arthur. Meanwhile, Judith, Marc, and Wouter provided an ethereal component with their interest in the paranormal and for neurolinguistic thinking.

In the end, the outsider Jeanette became the unlikely winner.

Ratings for the season were low and while Big Brother was still a hit in many countries around the world. At the end of this season, Big Brother was canceled in the Netherlands for the first time.

== Housemates ==
| Name | Age on entry | Hometown | Occupation | Day entered | Day exited | Result |
|---|---|---|---|---|---|---|
| Jeanette Godefroy | 20 | Emmeloord | Saleswoman | 1 | 118 | Winner |
| Margriet Post | 34 | Amsterdam | Accounts executive | 1 | 118 | Runner-up |
| Stefan | 32 | Uitgeest | Marketing Director / Porn actor | 1 | 118 | 3rd Place |
| Laurens Jongema | 29 | Leeuwarden | Insurance consultant | 1 | 118 | 4th Place |
| Wouter Valkier | 27 | Den Helder | Optician / Model | 51 | 118 | Evicted |
| Judith Peereboom | 29 | Alkmaar | Slimming consultant | 1 | 118 | Evicted |
| Mustapha "Mushi" Essakkati | 21 | Boskoop | Student | 1 | 114 | Evicted |
| Daniëla | 31 | Amsterdam | Receptionist | 1 | 107 | Evicted |
| Marc Vissers | 35 | Haarlem | Maintenance fitter | 51 | 100 | Evicted |
| Ting Chan | 30 | Amsterdam | Photographer / artist | 16 | 93 | Evicted |
| Arthur van Gijzel | 34 | Amsterdam | Ex-policeman | 37 | 86 | Evicted |
| Ursula Barendregt | 27 | Overijssel | Travel consultant | 44 | 79 | Evicted |
| Dennis van Solkema | 29 | Amsterdam | Barman | 37 | 72 | Evicted |
| Geesje de Vries | 31 | Gelderland | Assistant psychologist | 30 | 65 | Evicted |
| Martijn | 25 | Twente | Street maker | 1 | 58 | Evicted |
| Joyce Schoenmaekers | 22 | South Limburg | Supermarket worker | 44 | 51 | Evicted |
| Bram Recourt | 23 | Tilburg | Sports instructor | 23 | 44 | Evicted |
| Sandra | 25 | North Holland | Office worker | 30 | 37 | Evicted |
| Bo Koole | 23 | The Hague | Barman | 23 | 30 | Evicted |
| Carmen | 27 | Den Bosch | Manager of shoe shop | 16 | 23 | Evicted |
| Martijn Krabbé | 34 | Amsterdam | TV presenter | 1 | 2 | Walked |

== Nominations table ==
| | Week 3 | Week 4 | Week 5 | Week 6 | Week 7 | Week 8 | Week 9 | Week 10 | Week 11 | Week 12 | Week 13 | Week 14 | Week 15 | Week 16 | Week 17 Final | | | Nominations received |
|---|---|---|---|---|---|---|---|---|---|---|---|---|---|---|---|---|---|---|
| Jeanette | No; Nominations | No; Nominations | No; Nominations | No; Nominations | No; Nominations | No; Nominations | Daniela | Dennis | Daniela | Arthur | Ting | Marc | Daniela | Wouter | No; Nominations | Winner (Day 118) | | 6 |
| Margriet | No; Nominations | No; Nominations | No; Nominations | No; Nominations | No; Nominations | No; Nominations | Ursula | Mustapha | Ursula | Arthur | Ting | Marc | Daniela | Laurens | No; Nominations | Runner up (Day 118) | | 6 |
| Laurens | No; Nominations | No; Nominations | No; Nominations | No; Nominations | No; Nominations | No; Nominations | Geesje | Mustapha | Ursula | Mustapha | Margriet | Stefan | Margriet | Stefan | No; Nominations | Third place (Day 118) | | 8 |
| Stefan | No; Nominations | No; Nominations | No; Nominations | No; Nominations | No; Nominations | No; Nominations | Ursula | Laurens | Ting | Wouter | Ting | Wouter | Daniela | Laurens | No; Nominations | Fourth place (Day 118) | | 5 |
| Wouter | Not in House | | | | | No; Nominations | Jeanette | Laurens | Ting | Arthur | Ting | Stefan | Margriet | Mustapha | No; Nominations | Evicted (Day 118) | | 5 |
| Judith | No; Nominations | No; Nominations | No; Nominations | No; Nominations | No; Nominations | No; Nominations | Ursula | Marc | Ursula | Mustapha | Ting | Mustapha | Jeanette | Mustapha | No nominations | Evicted (Day 118) | | 5 |
| Mustapha | No; Nominations | No; Nominations | No; Nominations | No; Nominations | No; Nominations | No; Nominations | Judith | Laurens | Judith | Laurens | Margriet | Wouter | Judith | Stefan | Evicted (Day 114) | | | 9 |
| Daniela | No; Nominations | No; Nominations | No; Nominations | No; Nominations | No; Nominations | No; Nominations | Ursula | Arthur | Jeanette | Wouter | Jeanette | Mustapha | Jeanette | Evicted (Day 107) | | | | 8 |
| Marc | Not in House | | | | | No; Nominations | Ting | Laurens | Judith | Laurens | Margriet | Stefan | Evicted (Day 100) | | | | | 3 |
| Ting | No; Nominations | No; Nominations | No; Nominations | No; Nominations | No; Nominations | No; Nominations | Geesje | Mustapha | Daniela | Arthur | Margriet | Evicted (Day 93) | | | | | | 9 |
| Arthur | Not in House | | | No; Nominations | No; Nominations | No; Nominations | Daniela | Dennis | Ting | Wouter | Evicted (Day 86) | | | | | | | 6 |
| Ursula | Not in House | | | | No; Nominations | No; Nominations | Jeanette | Dennis | Judith | Evicted (Day 79) | | | | | | | | 7 |
| Dennis | Not in House | | | No; Nominations | No; Nominations | No; Nominations | Geesje | Arthur | Evicted (Day 72) | | | | | | | | | 3 |
| Geesje | Not in House | | No; Nominations | No; Nominations | No; Nominations | No; Nominations | Daniela | Evicted (Day 65) | | | | | | | | | | 3 |
| Martijn | No; Nominations | No; Nominations | No; Nominations | No; Nominations | No; Nominations | No; Nominations | Evicted (Day 58) | | | | | | | | | | | N/A |
| Joyce | Not in House | | | | No; Nominations | Evicted (Day 51) | | | | | | | | | | | | N/A |
| Bram | Not in House | No; Nominations | No; Nominations | No; Nominations | Evicted (Day 44) | | | | | | | | | | | | | N/A |
| Sandra | Not in House | | No; Nominations | Evicted (Day 37) | | | | | | | | | | | | | | N/A |
| Bo | Not in House | No; Nominations | Evicted (Day 30) | | | | | | | | | | | | | | | N/A |
| Carmen | No; Nominations | Evicted (Day 23) | | | | | | | | | | | | | | | | N/A |
| Martijn | Walked (Day 2) | | | | | | | | | | | | | | | | | N/A |
| Notes | 1 | 2 | 1 | 2 | 1 | 2 | 3 | 4 | 3 | 4 | 3 | 4 | 3 | 4 | 5 | 6 | | |
| Nominated For Eviction | Carmen, Daniela, Jeannette, Judith, Margriet, Ting | Bo, Bram, Laurens, Martijn, Mustapha, Stefan | Daniela, Geesje, Jeannette, Judith, Margriet, Sandra, Ting | Arthur, Bram, Dennis, Laurens, Martijn, Mustapha, Stefan | Daniela, Geesje, Jeannette, Joyce, Judith, Margriet, Ting, Ursula | Arthur, Dennis, Laurens, Marc, Martijn, Mustapha, Stefan, Wouter | Daniela, Geesje, Ursula | Dennis, Laurens, Mustapha | Judith, Ting, Ursula | Arthur, Wouter | Margriet, Ting | Marc, Mustapha, Stefan, Wouter | Daniela, Jeanette, Margriet | Laurens, Mustapha, Stefan | Jeannette, Judith, Margriet | Jeannette, Laurens, Margriet, Stefan | | |
| Nominated For Eviction | Carmen, Daniela, Jeannette, Judith, Margriet, Ting | Bo, Bram, Laurens, Martijn, Mustapha, Stefan | Daniela, Geesje, Jeannette, Judith, Margriet, Sandra, Ting | Arthur, Bram, Dennis, Laurens, Martijn, Mustapha, Stefan | Daniela, Geesje, Jeannette, Joyce, Judith, Margriet, Ting, Ursula | Arthur, Dennis, Laurens, Marc, Martijn, Mustapha, Stefan, Wouter | Daniela, Geesje, Ursula | Dennis, Laurens, Mustapha | Judith, Ting, Ursula | Arthur, Wouter | Margriet, Ting | Marc, Mustapha, Stefan, Wouter | Daniela, Jeanette, Margriet | Laurens, Mustapha, Stefan | Laurens, Stefan, Wouter | Jeannette, Laurens, Margriet, Stefan | | |
| Walked | Martijn | none | | | | | | | | | | | | | | | | |
| Evicted | Carmen; 8.6% to save | Bo; 12.4% to save | Sandra; 6.1% to save | Bram; 8% to save | Joyce; 8.6% to save | Martijn; 10.1% to save | Geesje; 32.5% to save | Dennis; 23.3% to save | Ursula; 22.6% to save | Arthur; 49.3% to save | Ting; 35.4% to save | Marc; 14% to save | Daniela; 22.3% to save | Mustapha; 30.5% to save | Judith; 22.6% to save | Stefan; 9.7% to win | Laurens; 24.4% to win | |
| Evicted | Carmen; 8.6% to save | Bo; 12.4% to save | Sandra; 6.1% to save | Bram; 8% to save | Joyce; 8.6% to save | Martijn; 10.1% to save | Geesje; 32.5% to save | Dennis; 23.3% to save | Ursula; 22.6% to save | Arthur; 49.3% to save | Ting; 35.4% to save | Marc; 14% to save | Daniela; 22.3% to save | Mustapha; 30.5% to save | Wouter; 9.8% to save | Margriet; 31.2% to win | Jeanette; 34.7% to win | |

=== Notes ===
- ^Note 1: This week, all male housemates were immune from eviction, and all female housemates automatically faced the public vote.
- ^Note 2: This week, all female housemates were immune from eviction, and all male housemates automatically faced the public vote.
- ^Note 3: This week, all male housemates were immune from eviction, and only female housemates could be nominated to face the public vote.
- ^Note 4: This week, all female housemates were immune from eviction, and only male housemates could be nominated to face the public vote.
- ^Note 5: This week, all housemates faced the public vote, however, two public votes were occurring at the same time: one for the female housemates and one for the male housemates. This season's only double eviction took place on the day of the finale, Day 118.
- ^Note 6: Following the double eviction on Day 118, the public voted for their winner to be crowned that night between the four remaining housemates, regardless of gender.
