= Big Brother 2021 (Dutch and Belgian TV series) =

- Season 1
- Presented by: Geraldine Kemper; Peter Van de Veire
- No. of days: 99
- No. of housemates: 19
- Winner: Jill Goede
- Runner-up: Nick Kraft
- No. of episodes: 82

Release
- Original network: Netherlands; RTL 5; RTL 4 (Premiere); Belgium; VIER/Play4
- Original release: 4 January – 8 April 2021

Additional information
- Filming dates: 31 December 2020 – 8 April 2021

Season chronology
- Next → Series 2022

Big Brother 2021 is the first cooperation season of the Dutch and Belgian version of Big Brother. It is the seventh regular version of Big Brother in both Belgium and the Netherlands. The show is broadcast on RTL 5 in the Netherlands and VIER (the channel rebranded as Play4 on 28 January 2021) in Belgium beginning on 3 January 2021. Live streams are available 24/7 on Videoland for Dutch viewers and on VIER(later GoPlay.be) and Telenet for Belgian viewers.

On 7 June 2020, it was announced by RTL that there would be a new Dutch season of Big Brother after an absence of 14 years to celebrate the 20th anniversary of the first Big Brother ever. On 23 July 2020, it was announced that it would be a cooperation with Belgian broadcaster SBS België, making it the first cooperated Big Brother season with housemates from both Netherlands and Belgium and the first Belgian season in 13 years.

Geraldine Kemper and Peter Van de Veire are co-hosts of the show. The show began airing on 4 January 2021. Eight housemates entered the house on launch night on New Year's Eve, 31 December 2020. The reception of the premiere episode of the season - "De Start" was successful, with more than 1.3 million viewers in the Netherlands and over 500,000 viewers in Belgium.

The final was on 8 April 2021 and the winner was Jill Goede. There was some controversy because the voting websites crashed because of high demand during the final vote. The bailiff declared the winner consulting the last intermediate score. The final was watched by 488.000 viewers in the Netherlands and 401.062 viewers in Belgium. The Belgian broadcaster Play4 called the season a modest hit with 378.00 daily viewers and 10 million views at the website. A new season was teased during the final.

== Production ==
=== Format ===
Big Brother 2021 followed the same format as the previous season of the program. Housemates lived in isolation from the outside world in a custom-built house for a period of 100 days, hoping to be the last one to leave the house as the winner, and walk away with a large cash prize.

==== Concept ====
Producers of the reality show called the comeback of the show a necessity in times where reality was filtered, enhanced and changed by social media. The show states that it would expose the housemates like they truly are. During the show Big Brother shared messages, pictures or videos posted by the housemates on their personal social media before their stay in the house with all the housemates.

This season was a reintroduction of Big Brother in both Netherlands and Belgium, it was again promoted as a social experiment.

=== Broadcasts ===
The premiere show is known as De Start (lit. The Start) was pre-recorded on the evening of 31 December 2020 and simultaneously broadcast on RTL 4 and RTL 5 in the Netherlands, VIER on Belgium on 4 January 2021. The show aired from Monday to Friday with the live show on Thursday night.

During the live shows, there were experts who gave their views about the interactions in the house. These experts were psychologist Kas Stuyf, sexologist Lotte Vanwezemael and social media expert Diederik Broekhuizen.

=== House ===
A new house was built in Amsterdam, next to the Johan Cruyff Arena at a parking lot of Endemol Shine Nederland in a few months. It was a 300 m^{2} House and had 125 cameras installed (100 indoor cameras and 25 outdoor cameras) and 39 speakers.

=== Changes ===
Unlike in previous Big Brother seasons, there were changes to minimise controversies that occasionally happen on the Big Brother series. Firstly, during the house tour, it was announced that the cameras in the showers would only be used if it was needed for character or interaction progress and not for voyeurism. Additionally, there was a change in the sexual activity that happens inside the Big Brother house. The rule was made between the producer and the housemates, in which the housemates are allowed to have sex with each other only if both housemates show their thumbs up towards the camera. The housemates can only receive beer and wine in small quantities on special occasions or weekends. The production team hopes that this will prevent untoward incidents that eventually cause problems later from happening in the house.

=== Impact of COVID-19 ===
Because of the COVID-19 pandemic, contestants had to be in quarantine ten days before entering the house. Each housemate was tested four times before participation. Since the housemates had tested negative for COVID-19, they could form a household and did not need to practice social distancing, following the COVID-19 regulations in the Netherlands and Belgium.

== Housemates ==
Despite the announcement that fourteen housemates would enter the house on launch night, it was revealed on 28 December 2020 that during the launch night, only four housemates from the Netherlands and four housemates from Belgium will enter the house.

| Name | Age | Occupation | Country | Residence | Day entered | Day exited | Status |
|---|---|---|---|---|---|---|---|
| Jill Goede | 22 | Cabin crew trainee | Netherlands | Landsmeer | 9 | 99 | Winner |
| Nick Kraft | 30 | Driver and DJ | Belgium | Morkhoven | 3 | 99 | Runner-up |
| Liese Luwel | 28 | Nurse | Belgium | Halen | 1 | 99 | 3rd place |
| Michel Hennipman | 36 | Navy veteran | Netherlands | Maarssen | 20 | 97 | Evicted |
| Julie Vanderzijl | 34 | Daycare owner | Belgium | Affligem | 20 | 92 | Evicted |
| Naomi Timmerman | 31 | Biologist and vegan lunch bar employee | Belgium | Mechelen | 1 | 85 | Evicted |
| Matt Herrijgers | 19 | Event manager and DJ | Netherlands | Zundert | 36 | 75 | Walked (Note: Matt was the first housemate to accept a bribe and he therefore voluntarily quit the show. As a result, he left the Big Brother house and received €15,000 from the total prize money.) |
| Zoey Hasselbank | 29 | DJ | Belgium | Schaerbeek | 9 | 71 | Evicted |
| Mike Voets | 28 | Advisor | Netherlands | Veghel | 37 | 64 | Evicted |
| Thomas Nagels | 23 | Commercial advisor | Belgium | Etterbeek | 1 | 57 | Evicted |
| Jerrel Baumann | 25 | Make-up artist | Netherlands | Amstelveen | 36 | 50 | Evicted |
| Patrick Van Staeyen | 59 | Shop owner | Belgium | Schoten | 20 | 43 | Evicted |
| Daniëlle Dielemans | 40 | Teacher | Netherlands | Made | 1 | 31 | Walked |
| Jowendrick "Jowi" Maduro | 25 | Student | Netherlands | The Hague | 1 | 31 | Walked |
| Nathalie Eling | 23 | Student | Netherlands | Groningen | 1 | 31 | Walked |
| Els Trollmann | 57 | Team leader at driving school | Netherlands | Dronten | 3 | 29 | Evicted |
| René Lubbers | 29 | ICT consultant | Netherlands | Hoorn | 9 | 22 | Evicted |
| Theo Sijtzema | 54 | DIY company owner | Netherlands | Amsterdam | 1 | 15 | Walked |
| Zakaria "Ziko" Ouchchen | 34 | Choreographer | Belgium | Lokeren | 1 | 8 | Evicted |

Non-chosen candidates

After the voluntary exits of Daniëlle, Jowi and Nathalie, the production decided to put new housemates into the house. On Day 32, mysterious pictures of five candidates appeared on the screen inside the house. On Day 34, more additional information about the five candidates revealed to the housemates. On Day 35, Big Brother calls the housemates to the living room and played voice introductions from the five candidates. A photo of each candidate also appears. During the live show on Day 36, the five candidates were finally introduced to the viewers. Housemates had to choose two candidates they like to see entering the house, they were Jerrel and Matt. Unbeknown to the other housemates, the third new housemates would be decided by the viewers among Jeroen, Mike and Mona. On the morning of Day 37, it was revealed that Mike was the third new housemate and entered the house.

| Name | Age | Occupation | Country | Residence |
|---|---|---|---|---|
| Jeroen van Beek | 51 | Gym owner | Netherlands | —N/a |
| Mona Jackson | 23 | None; Recently graduated | Netherlands | Breda |

== Twist ==
=== Prize money ===
In this season, housemates were required to do several tasks every week. These tasks were known as "secret mission", "challenge" or "weekly tasks". If the housemate(s) completed, they earned prize money for the winner of this season.

| | Current total amount | Task | Worth | Result | Increased/decreased |
|---|---|---|---|---|---|
| Week 1 | €0 (Initial) | Secret mission for Liese. | €5,000 | No | €0 |
| Week 1 | €0 (Initial) | Weekly task for Daniëlle and Jowi. | €4,000 | Maybe | +€2,000 |
| Week 1 | €0 (Initial) | Secret mission for Liese. | €5,000 | Yes | +€5,000 |
| Week 2 | €7,000 | Endurance challenge for housemates in duos. | Duos: • Theo and Els / €1,000 / ✗; • Jowi and Nathalie / €2,000 / ✗; • Rene and Naomi / €3,000 / ✗; • Daniëlle and Liese / €4,000 / ✓; • Zoey and Nick / €5,000 / ✗ | Yes | +€4,000 |
| Week 3 | €11,000 | Challenge for Nick. | €1,500 | Yes | +€1,500 |
| Week 3 | €11,000 | Challenge for housemates. | Worth of balls: • Golden ball / €?x2; • Pink ball / €10; • Black ball / Bankrupt | Maybe | +€4,260 |
| Week 4 | €16,760 | Challenge for Jowi and Zoey. | €1,500 | Maybe | +€550 |
| Week 5 | €17,310 | Dance marathon of 10 hours for housemates. | €5,000 | Maybe | +€4,000 |
| Week 5 | €17,310 | Three options for individuals | Options: 1. Knowing why their fellow housemates nominated them. / /; 2. Receive a personal item. / Deduct €100; 3. Receive a personal video message from home. / Deduct €250 | —N/a | –€350 |
| Week 6 | €20,960 | Weekly task for all housemates. | Worth of folded boxes: • Pink box / €50; • Purple box / €100; • Blue box / €500; If a box hit the ground, then that box worth nothing. | Maybe | +€3,100 |
| Week 7 | €24,060 | Puzzel challenge for all housemates. | €4,000 each puzzel | Yes | +€8,000 |
| Week 7 | €24,060 | A joint artwork challenge for all housemates except nominees | A work of art by the viewer. | Yes | +€500 (paid by a viewer) |
| Week 8 | €32,560 | 10-hour long challenge for all housemates. | €12.50 per minute a housemate holds the weight for more than half an hour. Maximum: €7,125: • The weight falls or made an error in the "Twister" game. / Deduct €250; • The housemate cannot survive half an hour. / Deduct €500 | Maybe | +€3,737.50 |
| Week 9 | €36,297.50 | Domino challenge for males and females each. | €2,000 per team. If domino falls, then it worth €0. | Yes | +€4,000 |
| Week 9 | €36,297.50 | Task for female housemates. | €1,500 | Yes | +€1,500 |
| Week 10 | €41,797.50 | Challenge for all housemates. | €12,000: €500 per wrong answer | Maybe | +€8,500 |
| Week 11 | €50,297.50 | Dilemma on Day 75 | Estimate the chances of reaching the final. The first to agree to leave the house today will receive money from the prize money. €15,000 | Yes | –€15,000 |
| Week 11 | €50,297.50 | Phone connection challenge for all housemates. | €9,000 but the counter continuing decrease until the connection is established. Bonus: a voicemail message for one housemate. | Maybe | +€2,200 |
| Week 12 | €37,497.50 | Mission for Jill and Julie in the White Room in 27 hours. | Ride an electric bicycle. €30 per kilometer. | Yes | +€9,000 |
| Week 12 | €37,497.50 | Five secret missions for Naomi. | €500 per mission. | Maybe | +€2,000 |
| Week 12 | €37,497.50 | Answer ten questions about stories told by former housemates. | €100 per right answer. | Maybe | +€700 |
| Week 13 | €49,197.50 | Housemates had to simultaneously play two games. | €3,000 | Maybe | +€2,100 |
| Week 13 | €49,197.50 | Challenge for all housemates | The first to finish earns €250, the second earns €500, the third earns €750, the fourth earns €1,000 and the fifth earns €2,500 | Yes | +€5,000 |
| Week 13 | €49,197.50 | A foam party | Various | Yes | +€1,860 |
| Week 14 | €58,157.50 | Challenge for ex-housemate Matt. | €1,000 | Yes | +€1,000 |
| Week 14 | €58,157.50 | Challenge for ex-housemate Naomi. | €1,000 | Yes | +€1,000 |
| Week 14 | €58,157.50 | Blindfold play for Jill and Liese. | €10,000 | Yes | +€10,000 |
| Total | €70,405.50 | | | | |

=== Caretaker & house rules ===
Every week, the viewers decided who became the Caretaker (Dutch: Huismeester). The Caretaker can't be nominated for eviction, they can create three house rules for that week and have to manage the grocery budget.

| Week | Caretaker | Caretaker's house rules |
|---|---|---|
| 1 | Jowi | 1. Theo & Nick cook, the other housemates clean according to the cleaning schedule.; 2. Everyday housemates play the werewolves game three times.; 3. Before going to bed, everyone hugs each other and say 'Bon Nochi'. |
| 2 | Thomas | 1. Everyone is obliged to run 15 laps.; 2. Shoes should not be worn in the house only outside.; 3. Housemate(s) who not willing to do cleaning or other house works will only drink water.; Penalty rule: If the rules are not followed, the person may only drink water for the rest of the week. |
| 3 | Nick | 1. Make the bed.; 2. Morning gymnastics.; 3. Group hug in the evening, and do something together.; Penalty rule: If the rules are not followed, the person should do twenty push-ups and fifty sit-ups in the middle of the group. |
| 4 | Liese | 1. Wake up when the Big Brother song played and make the bed before the song ends.; 2. A moment of confession every night and everything can be discussed.; 3. Lunch outside every day with all housemates or perform an activity together.; Penalty rule: If the house rules are not properly or correctly observed, a penalty will follow: take a dip in the hot tub. |
| 5 | Naomi | 1. Everyone has to speed dating for 5 minutes every day.; 2. Every day, someone has to come up with a tournament.; 3. After breakfast, housemates dance to music led by a housemate.; Penalty rule: If someone does not follow the rules, they must read a Big Brother poem of at least 10 lines to the whole house. |
| 6 | Jill | 1. Every morning housemates dance the polonaise around the house.; 2. Every day, duos are tied together for one hour and have to do everything together.; 3. Five minutes of laughter therapy every day.; Penalty rule: Every time you go to the bathroom, give each one a high five first. |
| 7 | Zoey | 1. “Chez Patrick" - Nick and Zoey take turns serving at "Chez Patrick".; 2. Half hour cleaning - Everyone cleans half an hour after eating.; 3. The compliments shower - In the middle shower, everyone compliments each other every day.; Penalty rule: If the rules are not followed, the person will receive a cold shower in the middle shower with clothes. |
| 8 | Mike | 1. Mike makes breakfast with a housemate every day.; 2. A full vegan meal every afternoon or evening.; 3. One or two housemate(s) learn a dance and perform it to the house.; Penalty rule: If the rules are not followed, the penalty is sleeping outside the bedroom on a folding bed. |
| 9 | none | |
| 10 | Julie | 1. Every day before going to sleep, we tell each other a personal story.; 2. One-quarter of an hour a day in complete self-isolation.; 3. Someone else cooks every day.; Penalty rule: If the rules are not followed, the penalty is one minute of planks in the garden. |
| 11 | Nick | 1. Get up with classical music and eat breakfast together.; 2. A group activity every day.; 3. Group hug, Nick puts everyone in and a round of compliment.; Penalty rule: If the rules are not followed, the penalty is the person must prepare breakfast for everyone. Big Brother changed rule #1: Get up every morning with a polonaise. This rule was voted by the viewers. |
| 12 | Michel | 1. A sports and games competition, the winner receives a prize.; 2. Clean part of the house thoroughly after dinner.; 3. Prepare a joint lunch and eat outside.; Penalty rule: If the rules are not followed, the penalty is to do 25 burpees. |
| 13 | none | 1. by Jill: Doing the birds dance sometime during the day, Big Brother decides when.; 2. by Julie: An activity every night, including a lullaby with a dance.; 3. by Liese: "Chez Patrick" returns, every evening the restaurant is opened where memories are recalled of a former housemate.; 4. by Michel: Telling a bedtime story about the Big Brother adventure.; 5. by Nick: After dinner, we all cleaning with the hardstyle music.; Penalty rule: If the rules are not followed, the penalty is to sleep outside on a folding bed. |
| 14 | none | 1. by Jill: Play the forbidden word game Geen Ja Geen Nee for one hour, for the loser the penalty is polonaise.; 2. by Liese: Before you grab candy or treat, run ten laps outside.; 3. by Michel: Every day someone does a starter, dinner and dessert.; 4. Nick: A tournament every day and the losers have to compliment the winner.; Penalty rule: If the rules are not followed, the penalty is to do the polonaise in the morning and unexpectedly at night. |

=== Immunity token ===
On Day 19, Daniëlle was called to the diary room and she returns with a box. Inside this box was an immunity token. This immunity token was earned during the knitting task. Housemates using this token cannot be eliminated. Daniëlle lied about the meaning of the token by telling her housemates that the housemate would be decided by a joint decision. This confused the housemates and led to nobody using the token. Big Brother eventually took the token back.

=== Rich and poor ===
On Day 58, Big Brother divided the housemates into two teams: Female housemates are in Yellow Team and Male housemates are in Green Team. Through a battle, Yellow Team wins the luxury side of the house which includes the living room, kitchen, garden, hot tub and sauna. The Green Team has to live on the poor side which includes the game room, pantry and bedroom. Also, the Green Team is not allowed to enter the rich side. On Day 61, this element ended and the whole house gathered together.

== Weekly summary ==
The main events in the Big Brother house are summarised in the table below.

Week 1
| Week 1 | Entrances | On Day 1, Jowi, Liese, Thomas, Danielle, Ziko, Naomi, Theo, and Nathalie entered the house during the premiere show.; On Day 3, Els and Nick entered the house at midnight. |
| Week 1 | Reality exposure | On Day 2, a Twitter post about Black Lives Matter of Naomi was shown. A TikTok video of Liese was played.; On Day 5, a video fragment of Theo's selection about women and racism was played. |
| Week 1 | Caretaker | On Day 5, Jowi was voted by viewers as the first Caretaker. |
| Week 1 | Tasks | On Day 1, Jowi was given a secret mission. He had to compliment all the other housemates with their eyes. He also had to decide who would sleep in the seven beds and one folding bed. Housemates would receive a party package for New Year's Eve and a key to unlock the hot tub if they completed the secret task. If he failed, the bedroom would be locked for the night. Jowi chose the folding bed for himself and succeeded in the task.; On Day 2, housemates took part in their first immunity challenge, which required them to solve a puzzle individually. They had to collect the puzzle pieces and bring them over a balance beam to the puzzle platform. Naomi won the challenge and immuned for nomination this week.; Through Day 2 to Day 3, Liese was given a secret mission. She was informed two new housemates would enter the house on the following night. To help them she had to secretly place a locked box at the entrance of the game room. If the secret task was completed, the housemates would earn €5,000 for the prize money. The two new housemates, Els and Nick had to do follow a tube trail in the game room to enter the house. They succeeded. Other housemates discovered the replaced box and took it to the bedroom. The two new housemates were discovered, which means the task is failed and no budget was won.; On Day 3, housemates got their first weekly task. The two chosen housemates with the most human knowledge, Daniëlle and Jowi, had to link eight quotes to the other housemates who said the quote. If they completed the task, the housemates would earn €4,000 for prize money. However, they didn't guess all of the quotes correctly, only €2,000 was added to the prize money.; Through Day 6 to Day 7, Liese was given a secret mission. She had to prepare the housemates to dance to the Big Brother theme song. She was allowed to choose one other housemate to help with the task. If she succeeded, €5,000 would be added to the prize money.; On Day 8, all housemates except nominees Liese and Ziko had to paint a picture of each other. After the task, the viewers voted for the housemate who painted best. The winner would receive a surprise from the viewers. |
| Week 1 | Nominations | On Day 7, Liese and Ziko received the most nominations and faced the public vote. |
| Week 1 | Exits | On Day 8, Ziko became the first housemate to be evicted. |
Week 2
| Week 2 | Entrances | On Day 9, Jill, René and Zoey entered the house. |
| Week 2 | Highlights | On Day 10, a drone dropped a box of Red Bull in the garden. Last week's Caretaker Jowi dropped Red Bull for vegan food on the grocery list, which upset some housemates. |
| Week 2 | Caretaker | On Day 11, Thomas received 21.76% of votes on the voting of "Who should be given a bigger role". Therefore, he was elected as the second Caretaker. |
| Week 2 | Tasks | On Day 12, Big Brother placed five ice balls on the outside. Their goal was to break the ice balls and collect the marbles inside each of them. Each marble they collected would earn them €5 for groceries. They were able to complete the task and earned €210.; On Day 13, Housemates must compete in an endurance challenge to balance on a stool. The public had voted for the strongest housemate and the weakest housemate. Housemates were then divided into duos by this voting result. During the challenge, they would have to step up onto a higher stool. The last remaining duo would earn an amount of money that would be added to the prize money. Caretaker Thomas chose Jill not to participate with him.; Distribution of pairs and amount of money: Theo and Els €1,000; Daniëlle and Liese €4,000; Jowi and Nathalie €2,000; Zoey and Nick €5,000; Rene and Naomi €3,000; Daniëlle and Liese won the challenge and earned €4,000.: On Day 14, Jill received a task to memorize photos of housemates' loved ones. Then she had to open eleven boxes in fifteen minutes with a key for each housemate. Inside the boxes was a favorite snack from one of the houseguests. Jill successfully opened nine boxes and passed the task.; On Day 15, the nominees Els & René received a task to place the correct housemate with their personal item. If they got all the items correct, they could give one of the personal items to a housemate. However, they failed.; On Day 15, the housemates except for the nominees Els & René got a task to spin a wheel. The color where the wheel landed determined what they had to do. They had to speak the truth, assign someone to do something or complete an assignment. If they did not want to perform an assignment, they could use a Joker. They were given three Jokers. The goal was to complete twenty assignments in one hour. If they failed this task, then they would not have any hot water for 24 hours. They passed the task. |
| Week 2 | Nominations | On Day 14, Els and René received the most nominations and faced the public vote. |
| Week 2 | Punishments | On Day 13, Theo received a warning for his sexist behavior and swearing. |
| Week 2 | Exits | On Day 15, Theo walked from the house. |
Week 3
| Week 3 | Entrances | On Day 20, Julie, Michel, and Patrick entered the house. |
| Week 3 | Caretaker | On Day 16, Nick was elected as the third Caretaker through a task. |
| Week 3 | Tasks | On Day 16, Nick has been called to the game room. He had to choose one of the six boxes each contained different items. The first box contained €1,500. The second box was he allowed to have a pet in the house for 24 hours. The third box contains a nomination. The fourth box was minus €400 from the prize money. The fifth box contains a chance to become a caretaker. The sixth box contains either €5,000 or minus €5,000 to the prize money. Nick chose to become a Caretaker.; Through Day 17 to Day 19, the housemates took part in the task to knit a blanket. They had to make it as big as possible. When they completed the task, they would receive a reward. They completed the task and got an immunity token.; Through Day 18 to Day 19, the housemates were given a balloon full of grocery budget money. They must keep the balloon intact and on at least one housemate's hand at all times for 24 hours. If the balloon explodes, touches the ceiling or floor, or leaves the hand of one of the housemates, they would fail the task. If they succeed, they would receive all of the money inside the balloon for their weekly grocery budget. Because the housemates succeeded, they received €175 for their grocery budget.; On Day 20, Nick received a challenge: he had to identify the 3 new housemates within the group in the game room. He passed the challenge and earned €1,500 to the prize money.; On Day 21, the housemates were assigned to hit tennis balls for the prize money. Each housemate would have one minute each to attempt to hit as many balls as possible. Pink balls were worth €10, yellow balls would double the money they earned in one minute, and black balls were worth €0. The housemates received a total of €4,200 for the prize money. |
| Week 3 | Nominations | On Day 15, the eviction plan for Week 2 was changed after Theo left the house. Because René received the fewest votes on the previous public vote, he was automatically nominated for this week's eviction. Liese and Naomi were nominated by the housemates. |
| Week 3 | Exits | On Day 22, René became the second housemate to be evicted. |
Week 4
| Week 4 | Caretaker | On Day 23, Liese was elected as the fourth Caretaker through a challenge. |
| Week 4 | Tasks | On Day 23, all housemates except Jill had to seat on chairs. One chair was different from the other chairs. The housemate that sat on this chair had to open an envelope. In the first round, the housemate is Daniëlle, she opened an envelope and received her personal item and had to decide which five other housemates had to leave this challenge with her. She chose Els, Julie, Michel, Patrick and Zoey. In the second round, the housemate is Jowi, he opened an envelope and received a punishment, he wasn't allowed to nominate this week. Jowi had to decide which two of the remaining housemates were the biggest opposites of each other, he chose Liese and Nathalie. Liese and Nathalie had to decide which one of them became the Caretaker. They decided it's Liese.; On Day 26, the housemates were required to collect sticks from a structure. The ring around the stick must not fall from the game. Each stick is worth a certain amount of money. In the end, the housemates earned €195 for the grocery budget.; On Day 27, the two selected housemates, Jowi and Zoey, were required to collect falling sticks from the ceiling. Each stick worth a certain amount of prize money. They would have the possibility to earn a maximum of €1,500 for the prize money. Additionally, there were purple sticks, which would allow them to earn a double vote for the nomination next week. In the end, they collected €550 and collected the purple sticks, but they decided not to use them.; On Day 29, all housemates, except Caretaker Liese and nominees Els and Patrick, must play a quiz challenge. They were divided into teams of two. The first team included Jowi, Julie, Naomi, Nathalie and Zoey. The second team included Daniëlle, Jill, Michel, Nick and Thomas. The winner of the challenge would earn one meter of beer. The team of Jowi, Julie, Naomi, Nathalie and Zoey won. |
| Week 4 | Nominations | On Day 27, Els and Patrick received the most nominations and faced the public vote. |
| Week 4 | Exits | On the early morning of Day 23, Jill was taken to the hospital for stomach pain. She returned to the house on Day 28 after 4 days of quarantine.; On Day 29, Els became the third housemate to be evicted. |
Week 5
| Week 5 | Caretaker | On Day 30, Naomi was elected as the fifth Caretaker through a challenge. |
| Week 5 | Highlights | On Day 31, Jowi said that he wanted to leave the house in two days. Nathalie joined in and said that she was also thinking of leaving. Big Brother gathered the housemates and said that his experiment is as hard as it could have been expected. Big Brother gave all housemates the choice to stay and continue the experiment or to leave. The housemates had only five minutes to decide. Daniëlle, Jowi and Nathalie decided to leave. Big Brother promised the other housemates that their experiment will be made for fun for the remaining weeks. |
| Week 5 | Tasks | On Day 32, the housemates had to catch blue balls from a device for their grocery budget. Each ball worth €1.5. In the end, the housemates earned €100.5 for the grocery budget.; Passed: On Day 34, the housemates had to take part in a task for the prize money. They could earn €5,000. There would be a dance marathon for ten hours. During the ten hours, at least two housemates must be on the dance floor. In the end, the housemates earned €4,000 for the prize money.; On Day 35, during the grocery shopping, each housemate was given three options. They could choose between knowing why they were nominated by their fellow housemates, they could receive a personal item or they could receive a message from home. However, if the housemates choose a personal item or a message from home, €100 and €250 would be removed from the prize money respectively. In the end, Liese chose to receive a personal item and Jill chose to receive a message from home, a total of €350 deducted from the prize money.; On Day 36, the housemates have to make a welcome song for the new housemates. |
| Week 5 | Exits | On Day 31, Daniëlle, Jowi, and Nathalie left the house voluntarily. |
Week 6
| Week 6 | Entrances | On Day 36, Jerrel and Matt entered the house during the live show after they were chosen by the housemates among five candidates. The third new housemate to enter the house would be decided by the viewers and Mike received the most votes, therefore, he became the third new housemate. He entered the house on the morning of Day 37. |
| Week 6 | Caretaker | During the live show on Day 36, Jill has been chosen by the public as the favorite housemate, therefore, she was elected as the sixth Caretaker. |
| Week 6 | Punishment | On Day 40, Jerrel received a warning for several unacceptable behaviors. |
| Week 6 | Tasks | On Day 40, the housemates had to take part in their shopping tasks in the garden. There was a bell in the garden and the housemates had to ring the bell as many times as possible within 15 minutes. Each ring would earn them €3 for the grocery budget. In the end, they earned €1,023 for their weekly grocery budget.; On Day 41, two housemates had to build a bridge as long as possible between their bodies and also build a fence with boxes. Each box would add a specific amount of money to the prize money. The other housemates had to throw boxes at the builders. In the end, the housemates earned €3,100 for the prize money.; On Day 43, each housemate except Patrick and Thomas had two hours to create and bake cupcakes with the Big Brother theme. The viewers voted for the housemate that baked the best cupcakes. The housemate that won the challenge would earn the right to play songs of their choice the next evening. Nick won.; On Day 43, both nominees Patrick and Nick would have to move a marble through a maze. They would both have the opportunity to solve the mission. If they succeed, they would earn a video message from home. |
| Week 6 | Nominations | As new housemates, Jerrel, Matt and Mike were not able to nominate or be nominated.; Thomas and Patrick received the most nominations and faced the public vote. |
| Week 6 | Exits | On Day 43, Patrick became the fourth housemate to be evicted. |
Week 7
| Week 7 | Caretaker | On Day 44, Zoey became the seventh caretaker after she won the “snowdeo” mission. |
| Week 7 | Tasks | On Day 44, the housemates had to balance on a snowboard in the “snowdeo” mission. The last two housemates remaining would advance to the final round, where the last one standing would become the caretaker. Zoey won.; On Day 47, the two housemates that the viewers voted as the strongest women, Liese and Naomi, had to unlock a chest based on clues. The winner would win immunity. However, they would also have the opportunity to give immunity to another housemate. Naomi won, but she decided to give the immunity to Julie.; On Day 48, the housemates had to make a puzzle out of wooden pieces. For each puzzle completed, the housemates would earn €4,000 for the prize money. The housemates earned €8,000 for the prize money.; On Day 50, all housemates except the three nominees, Jerrel, Michel, and Nick, had one hour to draw a painting about the most important event of their life. The winner of the challenge would earn a piece of artwork made by one of the viewers. |
| Week 7 | Nominations | Jerrel, Michel, and Nick faced the public vote. |
| Week 7 | Exits | On Day 50, Jerrel became the fifth housemate to be evicted. |
Week 8
| Week 8 | Caretaker | On Day 51, Mike became the eighth caretaker after the caretaker challenge. |
| Week 8 | Tasks | On Day 51, the housemates were given 500 balloons. One of the balloons contains an indication that gives its holder the power to become the caretaker. The housemate who finds this balloon would become the caretaker. Mike found the balloon and became the caretaker for Week 8.; On Day 54, the housemates had ten seconds each to touch as many blue balls as possible with just one finger. Each housemate has only one attempt. Each ball is worth a specific amount of money. If the housemate touched an orange ball or if the time is up, the amount will be deducted. In the end, the housemates earned €91.50 for the grocery budget.; On Day 55, the housemates were given a 10-hour long challenge. One housemate had to hold up a weight with a rope while changing the positions of their hands and feet after a wheel is spun. The housemates would be allowed to switch after half an hour. If the housemate chooses to switch before that time, an amount of the money they already earned would be deducted. The amount of money that the housemate earned depended on how long they were holding the weight. In the end, €3,737.50 was earned for the prize money. |
| Week 8 | Nominations | Jill and Thomas received the most nominations and faced the public vote. |
| Week 8 | Exits | On Day 57, Thomas became the sixth housemate to be evicted. |
Week 9
| Week 9 | Tasks | On Day 58, Big Brother divided the house into the rich and poor sections. To earn the luxury, the housemates had to compete in teams. The teams were divided by gender. The winners of the challenge would earn access to the living room, the kitchen, the hot tub, and the sauna, while the losers of the competition would earn access to the game room, the pantry, and the bedrooms. Female housemates won the challenge and stay in the rich section. Male housemates had to move to the poor section of the house and had no privileges.; On Day 61, the housemates had to compete separately in a task. The male housemates had to build a 100 meters long stack of dominoes in two hours. The female housemates had to build a 125 meters long stack of dominoes. If they completed the stacks successfully, they would earn €2,000 each for the prize money. If they fail to complete the task, they would earn nothing. In the end, both teams successfully completed the task, therefore, they were able to add €4,000 to the prize money.; On Day 61, the rich and poor houses merged. The female housemates had to keep all of the male housemates in the hot tub for two hours, give each of them a bottle of beer, prepare a meal, sing a song for them, and tell them a bedtime story. If they succeeded, they would earn €1,500 for the prize money. On Day 62, Big Brother announced that they successfully completed the task.; On Day 62, the male housemates and female housemates would compete in an immunity challenge. Because there was an extra female, Liese decided to sit out and not participate in the challenge. For the challenge, the teams had to solve various puzzles. The first team to complete all of them would win immunity. The female housemates won and became immune from the nomination. |
| Week 9 | Nominations | Only male housemates were available to be nominated this week. Matt and Mike received the most nominations and faced the public vote. |
| Week 9 | Exits | On Day 64, Mike became the seventh housemate to be evicted. |
Week 10
| Week 10 | Caretaker | On Day 66, Julie became the ninth caretaker after the caretaker challenge. |
| Week 10 | Tasks | On Day 65, for the caretaker challenge this week, the housemates had to balance an egg while wearing a helmet. If the egg falls, then the housemate will be out of the challenge. The last housemate standing won the caretaker challenge. On Day 66, Julie won the challenge.; On Day 66, all housemates except Nick were given the task to plan a surprise for Nick's birthday by writing and singing a song for him. If they succeed in the task, Big Brother would give the housemates a party. They succeeded.; During the live show on Day 64, the viewers were asked to submit true/false questions about current events in the outside world. On Day 68, the housemates were asked if the questions were either true or false. They would earn a specific amount of money for every correct question. In the end, the housemates earned €212 for the grocery budget.; On Day 69, all housemates were given a task that would last 24 hours. Each housemate was given a code and at random increments throughout the day, one housemate would be called. After they get called, they would have thirty seconds to enter their code using the tablet in the game room. The prize money earned started at €5,000. However, if the housemates enter the code incorrectly or do not make it to the game room in time, they would lose money. They could gain up to €12,000 in prize money if all housemates got all of the answers correct. In the end, the housemates made seven mistakes and earned €8,500 for the prize money. |
| Week 10 | Nominations | Housemates were not allowed to nominate this week. Instead, the public nominated Jill, Michel, and Zoey for eviction. |
| Week 10 | Exits | On Day 71, Zoey became the eighth housemate to be evicted. |
Week 11
| Week 11 | Caretaker | On Day 72, Nick became the tenth caretaker after the caretaker challenge. |
| Week 11 | Tasks | On Day 72, the housemates had to balance a ping pong ball on a platform. If their ball drops, they would be out of the challenge. The last housemate standing would become the caretaker. Nick won.; On Day 75, all housemates were required to stop communicating with each other for a certain amount of time. If any of the housemates communicate, verbally or non-verbally, they would be automatically nominated for eviction. The completion of this task would result in temporary safety from eviction. The housemates passed this task.; On Day 75, there was a dilemma. Every housemate should estimate their chances of reaching the final. The first housemate to agree to leave the show on that day will receive €15,000 from the prize money.; On Day 76, the housemates were required to connect two phones using colored tubes. The prize money would start at €9,000 and would slowly decrease during the task. The prize money counter would stop decreasing after the connection was established. In the end, the housemates earned €2,200 to the prize money.; On Day 78, all housemates except Nick would play four rounds of Bingo. The winner of each round would receive a letter from home or a luxury item. However, if the same housemate wins more than once, they would have to wield their reward to another housemate. |
| Week 11 | Nominations | Jill, Julie, and Liese faced the public vote. |
| Week 11 | Exits | On Day 75, Matt accepted the bribe from Big Brother and had to leave voluntarily. |
Week 12
| Week 12 | Caretaker | On Day 79, Michel became the eleventh and the last caretaker of the season after the caretaker challenge. |
| Week 12 | Tasks | On Day 79, all housemates had to balance a hanging tube with footrests. If any housemate drops the tube, then they would be out of the challenge. The last housemate standing would become the final caretaker of the season and automatically earn a spot in the semi-final.; On Day 82, housemates were split into pairs and took turns in entering a dark room with tiles on the floor. The first member of each pair would grab a tile and then describe the pattern on top of it to their partner. After this, the partner would enter the dark room and try to grab the matching tile with the same pattern. For each correct pair, they would earn €30 for the grocery budget. In the end, they earned €180 by correctly finding 6 pairs.; On Day 82, both Julie and Jill were sent to the white room. They were both told to exercise on an electric bicycle. For every kilometer cycled, they would earn €30 for the prize money. They had 27 hours to earn as much money as they could. In the end, they earned €9,000 for the prize money.; On Day 82, Naomi was given five secret missions. She had to have Nick brush his teeth, sleep in another housemate's bed, say the word "turtle" twenty different times, wear a piece of each housemate's clothing, and make Liese do a roll-over. For every completed mission, Naomi would earn €500 for the prize money. In the end, Naomi successfully completed four of the missions and earned €2,000 for the prize money.; On Day 85, some of the former housemates would tell the current housemates stories. They would have to memorize the events in the stories. Later, Big Brother asked them ten questions about the stories. For every correct answer, the housemates would earn €100 for the prize money. In the end, they earned €700. |
| Week 12 | Nominations | Julie and Naomi faced the public vote. |
| Week 12 | Exits | On Day 85, Naomi became the ninth housemate to be evicted. |
Week 13
| Week 13 | Tasks | On Day 87, the housemates had to simultaneously play two games to earn two different rewards. The housemates would have to play a game of tennis and enter codes on a tablet. If they successfully completed both of them, they could earn up to €3,000 for the prize money and 30 minutes of a call from home. In the end, the housemates earned €2,100 for the prize money and a 27 minutes call duration.; On Day 89, the housemates had to roll a rope around a spool by walking in circles in order to earn money for the prize money. In the end, the housemates earned €5,000.; On Day 91, the housemates had a foam party. All around the foam, the housemates could earn a certain amount of money for the prize money. The money had to be kept in a special chest. In the end, the housemates earned €1,860. |
| Week 13 | Nominations | Housemates no longer nominate. All housemates faced the public vote. |
| Week 13 | Exits | On Day 92, Julie became the tenth housemate to be evicted. |
Week 14
| Week 14 | Tasks | On Day 94, the evicted housemate Matt had to balance an egg while wearing a helmet. If the challenge succeeded, the housemates would earn €1,000 for the prize money. |
| Week 14 | Nominations | All housemates faced the public vote; one of them would be evicted before the finale.; The three remaining housemates faced the public vote to win. |
| Week 14 | Exits | On Day 97, Michel became the eleventh and last housemate to be evicted.; On Day 99, Liese left the House as the third placer. Jill was announced as the winner, leaving Nick as the second placer. |

== Episodes ==
| No. overall | No. in season | Title | Day(s) | Original release date |
|---|---|---|---|---|
Week 1
| 1 | 1 | "Episode 1 - Launch" | Day 1–2 | January 4, 2021 |
| 2 | 2 | "Episode 2" | Day 2-3 | January 5, 2021 |
| 3 | 3 | "Episode 3" | Day 3-4 | January 6, 2021 |
| 4 | 4 | "Episode 4" | Day 4-8 & Live-Show 1 | January 7, 2021 |
| 5 | 5 | "Episode 5" | Day 8 | January 8, 2021 |
| 6 | 6 | "Episode 6" | Week 1 summary | January 10, 2021 |
Week 2
| 7 | 7 | "Episode 7" | Day 9 | January 11, 2021 |
| 8 | 8 | "Episode 8" | Day 10-11 | January 12, 2021 |
| 9 | 9 | "Episode 9" | Day 11-13 | January 13, 2021 |
| 10 | 10 | "Episode 10" | Day 13-15 & Live-Show 2 | January 14, 2021 |
| 11 | 11 | "Episode 11" | Day 15 | January 15, 2021 |
| 12 | 12 | "Episode 12" | Week 2 summary | January 17, 2021 |
Week 3
| 13 | 13 | "Episode 13" | Day 16-17 | January 18, 2021 |
| 14 | 14 | "Episode 18" | Day 17-18 | January 19, 2021 |
| 15 | 15 | "Episode 15" | Day 18-20 | January 20, 2021 |
| 16 | 16 | "Episode 16" | Day 20-22 & Live-Show 3 | January 21, 2021 |
| 17 | 17 | "Episode 17" | Day 22 | January 22, 2021 |
| 18 | 18 | "Episode 18" | Week 3 summary | January 24, 2021 |
Week 4
| 19 | 19 | "Episode 19" | Day 23-24 | January 25, 2021 |
| 20 | 20 | "Episode 20" | Day 24-25 | January 26, 2021 |
| 21 | 21 | "Episode 21" | Day 25-27 | January 27, 2021 |
| 22 | 22 | "Episode 22" | Day 27-29 & Live-Show 4 | January 28, 2021 |
| 23 | 23 | "Episode 23" | Day 29 | January 29, 2021 |
| 24 | 24 | "Episode 24" | Week 4 summary | January 31, 2021 |
Week 5
| 25 | 25 | "Episode 25" | Day 30-31 | February 1, 2021 |
| 26 | 26 | "Episode 26" | Day 31-32 | February 2, 2021 |
| 27 | 27 | "Episode 27" | Day 32-34 | February 3, 2021 |
| 28 | 28 | "Episode 28" | Day 34-36 & Live-Show 5 | February 4, 2021 |
| 29 | 29 | "Episode 29" | Day 36 | February 5, 2021 |
| 30 | 30 | "Episode 30" | Week 5 summary | February 7, 2021 |
Week 6
| 31 | 31 | "Episode 31" | Day 37-38 | February 8, 2021 |
| 32 | 32 | "Episode 32" | Day 38-39 | February 9, 2021 |
| 33 | 33 | "Episode 33" | Day 39-41 | February 10, 2021 |
| 34 | 34 | "Episode 34" | Day 41-43 & Live-Show 6 | February 11, 2021 |
| 35 | 35 | "Episode 35" | Day 43 | February 12, 2021 |
| 36 | 36 | "Episode 36" | Week 6 summary | February 14, 2021 |
Week 7
| 37 | 37 | "Episode 37" | Day 44-45 | February 15, 2021 |
| 38 | 38 | "Episode 38" | Day 45-46 | February 16, 2021 |
| 39 | 39 | "Episode 39" | Day 46-48 | February 17, 2021 |
| 40 | 40 | "Episode 40" | Day 48-50 & Live-Show 7 | February 18, 2021 |
| 41 | 41 | "Episode 41" | Day 50 | February 19, 2021 |
| 42 | 42 | "Episode 42" | Week 7 summary | February 21, 2021 |
Week 8
| 43 | 43 | "Episode 43" | Day 51-52 | February 22, 2021 |
| 44 | 44 | "Episode 44" | Day 52-53 | February 23, 2021 |
| 45 | 45 | "Episode 45" | Day 53-55 | February 24, 2021 |
| 46 | 46 | "Episode 46" | Day 55-57 & Live-Show 8 | February 25, 2021 |
| 47 | 47 | "Episode 47" | Day 57 | February 26, 2021 |
| 48 | 48 | "Episode 48" | Week 8 summary | February 28, 2021 |
Week 9
| 49 | 49 | "Episode 49" | Day 58-59 | March 1, 2021 |
| 50 | 50 | "Episode 50" | Day 59-60 | March 2, 2021 |
| 51 | 51 | "Episode 51" | Day 60-62 | March 3, 2021 |
| 52 | 52 | "Episode 52" | Day 62-64 & Live-Show 9 | March 4, 2021 |
| 53 | 53 | "Episode 53" | Day 64 | March 5, 2021 |
| 54 | 54 | "Episode 54" | Week 9 summary | March 7, 2021 |
Week 10
| 55 | 55 | "Episode 55" | Day 65-66 | March 8, 2021 |
| 56 | 56 | "Episode 56" | Day 66-67 | March 9, 2021 |
| 57 | 57 | "Episode 57" | Day 67-69 | March 10, 2021 |
| 58 | 58 | "Episode 58" | Day 69-71 & Live-Show 10 | March 11, 2021 |
| 59 | 59 | "Episode 59" | Day 71 | March 12, 2021 |
| 60 | 60 | "Episode 60" | Week 10 summary | March 14, 2021 |
Week 11
| 61 | 61 | "Episode 61" | Day 72-73 | March 15, 2021 |
| 62 | 62 | "Episode 62" | Day 73-74 | March 16, 2021 |
| 63 | 63 | "Episode 63" | Day 74-76 | March 17, 2021 |
| 64 | 64 | "Episode 64" | Day 76-78 & Live-Show 11 | March 18, 2021 |
| 65 | 65 | "Episode 65" | Day 78 | March 19, 2021 |
| 66 | 66 | "Episode 66" | Week 11 summary | March 21, 2021 |
Week 12
| 67 | 67 | "Episode 67" | Day 79-80 | March 22, 2021 |
| 68 | 68 | "Episode 68" | Day 80-81 | March 23, 2021 |
| 69 | 69 | "Episode 69" | Day 81-83 | March 24, 2021 |
| 70 | 70 | "Episode 70" | Day 83-85 & Live-Show 12 | March 25, 2021 |
| 71 | 71 | "Episode 71" | Day 85 | March 26, 2021 |
| 72 | 72 | "Episode 72" | Week 12 summary | March 28, 2021 |
Week 13
| 73 | 73 | "Episode 73" | Day 86-87 | March 29, 2021 |
| 74 | 74 | "Episode 74" | Day 87-88 | March 30, 2021 |
| 75 | 75 | "Episode 75" | Day 88-90 | March 31, 2021 |
| 76 | 76 | "Episode 76" | Day 90-92 & Live-Show 13 | April 1, 2021 |
| 77 | 77 | "Episode 77" | Day 92 | April 2, 2021 |
| 78 | 78 | "Episode 78" | Week 13 summary | April 4, 2021 |
Week 14
| 79 | 79 | "Episode 73" | Day 93-94 | April 5, 2021 |
| 80 | 80 | "Episode 74" | Day 94-95 | April 6, 2021 |
| 81 | 81 | "Episode 75" | Day 95-97 | April 7, 2021 |
| 82 | 82 | "Episode 76" | Day 97-99 & Final | April 8, 2021 |

== Nominations table ==
Housemates from The Netherlands
Housemates from Belgium
Tie-breaker vote

| | Week 1 | Week 2 | Week 3 | Week 4 | Week 5 | Week 6 | | Week 7 | Week 8 | Week 9 | Week 10 | | Week 11 | Week 12 | Week 13 | Week 14 | | |
| | Week 1 | Week 2 | Week 3 | Week 4 | Week 5 | Candidate | Nominations | Week 7 | Week 8 | Week 9 | Day 69 | Day 70 | Week 11 | Week 12 | Week 13 | Day 92 | Final | |
|---|---|---|---|---|---|---|---|---|---|---|---|---|---|---|---|---|---|---|
| Jill | Not in House | Els; Liese | Liese; Zoey | Hospitalised | No; Nominations | Mike; Matt | Michel; Julie | Nick; Michel | Nick; Michel | Nick; Michel | Not; Eligible | Nominated | Liese; Naomi | Naomi | No; Nominations | No; Nominations | Winner (Day 99) | |
| Nick | Els; Liese | Els; René | Els; Jill | Els; Nathalie | No; Nominations | Jerrel; Matt | Thomas; Zoey | Jerrel; Jill | Jill; Thomas | Mike; Matt | Not; Eligible | | Jill; Julie | Jill | No; Nominations | No; Nominations | Runner-Up (Day 99) | |
| Nick | Els; Liese | Els; René | Els; Jill | Els; Nathalie | No; Nominations | Jerrel; Matt | Thomas; Zoey | Jerrel; Jill | Jill; Thomas | Mike; Matt | Not; Eligible | | Naomi to save | Jill | No; Nominations | No; Nominations | Runner-Up (Day 99) | |
| Liese | Theo; Nathalie | Nathalie; René | Nathalie; Daniëlle | Els; Daniëlle | No; Nominations | Jerrel; Matt | Thomas; Patrick | Jill; Jerrel | Thomas; Jill | Mike; Matt | Not; Eligible | | Jill; Julie | Naomi | No; Nominations | No; Nominations | Third Place (Day 99) | |
| Liese | Theo; Nathalie | Nathalie; René | Nathalie; Daniëlle | Julie to save | No; Nominations | Jerrel; Matt | Thomas; Patrick | Jill; Jerrel | Thomas; Jill | Mike; Matt | Not; Eligible | | Jill; Julie | Naomi | No; Nominations | No; Nominations | Third Place (Day 99) | |
| Michel | Not in House | | | Patrick; Daniëlle | No; Nominations | Jerrel; Matt | Thomas; Patrick | Jerrel; Jill | Thomas; Jill | Mike; Matt | Not; Eligible | Nominated | Liese; Naomi | Naomi | No; Nominations | No; Nominations | Evicted (Day 97) | |
| Julie | Not in House | | | Els; Nathalie | No; Nominations | Jerrel; Matt | Thomas; Patrick | Jerrel; Jill | Thomas; Jill | Mike; Matt | Caretaker | | Liese; Naomi | Naomi | No; Nominations | Evicted (Day 92) | | |
| Naomi | Thomas; Theo | Els; Jill | Nathalie; Thomas | Els; Daniëlle | Caretaker | Jerrel; Matt | Thomas; Patrick | Jerrel; Jill | Jill; Thomas | Mike; Matt | Not; Eligible | | Jill; Julie | Jill | Evicted (Day 85) | | | |
| Matt | Not in House | | | | | Candidate | Exempt | Michel; Nick | Michel; Nick | Nick; Michel | Not; Eligible | | Bribed (Day 75) | | | | | |
| Zoey | Not in House | René; Jill | Nathalie; Jill | Els; Nathalie | No; Nominations | Jerrel; Matt | Nick; Michel | Nick; Michel | Michel; Naomi | Nick; Michel | Not; Eligible | Nominated | Evicted (Day 71) | | | | | |
| Zoey | Not in House | René; Jill | Nathalie; Jill | Els; Nathalie | No; Nominations | Jerrel; Matt | Nick; Michel | Jill to save | Michel; Naomi | Nick; Michel | Not; Eligible | Nominated | Evicted (Day 71) | | | | | |
| Mike | Not in House | | | | | Candidate | Exempt | Michel; Liese | Jill; Thomas | Michel; Matt | Evicted (Day 64) | | | | | | | |
| Thomas | Ziko; Liese | Jill; René | Liese; Naomi | Zoey; Julie | No; Nominations | Mike; Matt | Liese; Julie | Nick; Michel | Michel; Nick | Evicted (Day 57) | | | | | | | | |
| Jerrel | Not in House | | | | | Candidate | Exempt | Michel; Nick | Evicted (Day 50) | | | | | | | | | |
| Patrick | Not in House | | | Els; Naomi | No; Nominations | Jeroen; Mona | Thomas; Julie | Evicted (Day 43) | | | | | | | | | | |
| Daniëlle | Liese; Ziko | René; Naomi | Liese; Naomi | Patrick; Julie | Walked (Day 31) | | | | | | | | | | | | | |
| Jowi | Ziko; Liese | René; Nick | Liese; Naomi | Not; Eligible | Walked (Day 31) | | | | | | | | | | | | | |
| Nathalie | Liese; Ziko | René; Naomi | Liese; Naomi | Patrick; Julie | Walked (Day 31) | | | | | | | | | | | | | |
| Els | Ziko; Daniëlle | Naomi; René | Liese; Naomi | Patrick; Julie | Evicted (Day 29) | | | | | | | | | | | | | |
| René | Not in House | Els; Nathalie | Liese; Zoey | Evicted (Day 22) | | | | | | | | | | | | | | |
| Theo | Ziko; Liese | René; Els | Walked (Day 15) | | | | | | | | | | | | | | | |
| Ziko | Theo; Nathalie | Evicted (Day 8) | | | | | | | | | | | | | | | | |
Non-chosen candidates
| Jeroen | | | | | | Candidate | Not chosen | | | | | | | | | | | |
| Mona | | | | | | Candidate | Not chosen | | | | | | | | | | | |
| Notes | 1, 2 | 3 | 3 | 4 | 5 | 6 | none | 7, 8 | none | 9, 10 | 11 | | 12, 13, 14 | 15, 16 | 17 | 18 | 19 | |
| Caretaker | Jowi | Thomas | Nick | Liese | Naomi | | Jill | Zoey | Mike | none | Julie | | Nick | Michel | none | | | |
| Immunity winner | Naomi | none | | | | | | ~~Naomi~~; Julie | none | Jill; Julie; Liese; Naomi; Zoey | none | | | | | | | |
| Against public vote | Liese; Ziko | Els; René | Liese; Naomi; René | Els; ~~Julie~~; Patrick | none | Jeroen; Mike; Mona | Patrick; Thomas | Jerrel; ~~Jill~~; Michel; Nick | Jill; Thomas | Matt; Mike | Jill; Julie; Liese; Matt; Michel; Naomi; Nick; Zoey | Jill; Michel; Zoey | Jill; Julie; Liese; ~~Naomi~~ | Julie; Naomi | Jill; Julie; Liese; Michel; Nick | Jill; Liese; Michel; Nick | Jill; Liese; Nick | |
| Walked | none | Theo | none | | Daniëlle; Jowi; Nathalie | none | | | | | | | Matt; Bribed (€15,000) | none | | | | |
| Evicted | Ziko; Fewest votes to save | René; Fewest votes to save | René; Fewest votes to save | Els; Fewest votes to save | No; Eviction | Jerrel; 6 of 9 votes to enter | Patrick; Fewest votes to save | Jerrel; Fewest votes to save | Thomas; Fewest votes to save | Mike; Fewest votes to save | Jill; Most votes to nominate | Zoey; Fewest votes to save | Julie; Fewest votes to save | Naomi; Fewest votes to save | Julie; Fewest votes to save | Michel; Fewest votes to save | Liese; Fewest votes to win | Nick; Fewest votes to win |
| Evicted | Ziko; Fewest votes to save | René; Fewest votes to save | René; Fewest votes to save | Els; Fewest votes to save | No; Eviction | Matt; 8 of 9 votes to enter | Patrick; Fewest votes to save | Jerrel; Fewest votes to save | Thomas; Fewest votes to save | Mike; Fewest votes to save | Michel; Most votes to nominate | Zoey; Fewest votes to save | Julie; Fewest votes to save | Naomi; Fewest votes to save | Julie; Fewest votes to save | Michel; Fewest votes to save | Liese; Fewest votes to win | Nick; Fewest votes to win |
| Evicted | Ziko; Fewest votes to save | René; Fewest votes to save | René; Fewest votes to save | Els; Fewest votes to save | No; Eviction | Matt; 8 of 9 votes to enter | Patrick; Fewest votes to save | Jerrel; Fewest votes to save | Thomas; Fewest votes to save | Mike; Fewest votes to save | Michel; Most votes to nominate | Zoey; Fewest votes to save | Julie; Fewest votes to save | Naomi; Fewest votes to save | Julie; Fewest votes to save | Michel; Fewest votes to save | Jill; Most votes to win | |
| Evicted | Ziko; Fewest votes to save | René; Fewest votes to save | René; Fewest votes to save | Els; Fewest votes to save | No; Eviction | Mike; Most votes to enter | Patrick; Fewest votes to save | Jerrel; Fewest votes to save | Thomas; Fewest votes to save | Mike; Fewest votes to save | Zoey; Most votes to nominate | Zoey; Fewest votes to save | Julie; Fewest votes to save | Naomi; Fewest votes to save | Julie; Fewest votes to save | Michel; Fewest votes to save | Jill; Most votes to win | |

=== Notes ===
- ^1: Because Naomi won the first immunity challenge, she became immune from eviction.
- ^2: Because Jowi was elected as the Caretaker, he cannot be nominated for eviction. Also, he can create three house rules by himself and manage the grocery budget.
- ^3: Theo chose to leave the house because he was unhappy during his stay in the house. Due to Theo's voluntary departure, neither Els and René would be evicted. Instead, the nominee who received the fewer votes would be automatically nominated for the next week.
- ^4: In Week 4, because Jill was not in the house during the time of nomination, neither was she able to nominate, nor could she be nominated by the other housemates. Jowi was the first to be called to the diary room and was then told that he cannot nominate because he has lost his chance in the caretaker challenge. Furthermore, the nominations resulted in a tie between Julie and Patrick. Caretaker Liese then had to make the decision between the two of them. She chose Patrick to be the second nominee, besides Els.
- ^5: On Day 31, Daniëlle, Jowi and Nathalie voluntarily left the house.
- ^6: At the end of Week 5, Big Brother gave the housemates information on the five candidates to be new housemates. The candidates were all Dutch (to replace Daniëlle, Jowi and Nathalie). Each housemate had to vote for two out of five candidates they would like to see entering the house. Jerrel and Matt were the two who received the most votes and entered the house at the end of the live show on Day 36. Unbeknown to the other housemates, the third new housemates will be decided by the viewers among Jeroen, Mike, and Mona. On the morning of Day 37, Mike became the third new housemate to enter the house.
- ^7: Julie received immunity from Naomi after Naomi won the challenge.
- ^8: In this week's nomination, there was a tie between three housemates: Jerrel, Jill, and Nick. Caretaker Zoey had the chance to save one of them from the nomination. She chose to save Jill.
- ^9: There was no caretaker for Week 9. Big Brother divided the housemates into two teams: Female housemates are in the Yellow Team and Male housemates are in the Green Team. Through a battle, the Yellow Team wins the luxury side of the house, which includes the living room, kitchen, garden, hot tub, and sauna. The Green Team has to live on the poor side, which includes the game room, pantry and bedroom. Also, the Green Team is not allowed to enter the rich side.
- ^10: The female housemates won a game against the male housemates. All of the female housemates were immune from the nominations this week.
- ^11: This week, the housemates did not nominate. Instead, the viewers held all the power to nominate and decide who would be evicted. The viewers nominated Jill, Michel and Zoey.
- ^12: On Day 75, there was a dilemma. The first to agree to leave the show on that day will receive €15,000 from the prize money.
- ^13: In this week's nomination, there was a tie between four housemates Jill, Julie, Liese, and Naomi. Caretaker Nick had the chance to save one of them from the nomination. He chose to save Naomi.
- ^14: Due to Matt's voluntary departure, none among Jill, Julie, and Liese would be evicted. Instead, the nominee who received the fewest votes would be automatically nominated for the next week.
- ^15: Jill and Julie were sent to the White Room.
- ^16: For this week's nomination, the housemates were only allowed to nominate one of their fellow housemates. Jill and Julie nominated in the White Room; they each wrote their nomination on a card inside an envelope.
- ^17: This week, there was no more caretaker and the viewers voted for who they wanted to see in the finale.
- ^18: For the final week, one of the four housemates would be evicted before the finale.
- ^19: The public were voting for who they wanted to win, rather than to save.
