= Big Brother (Dutch TV series) season 2 =

Big Brother
- Season 2
- Presented by: Esther Duller & Beau Van Erven Doren
- No. of days: 109
- No. of housemates: 15
- Winner: Bianca Hagenbeek
- Runner-up: Robin Veen

Release
- Original network: Veronica
- Original release: 14 September – 30 December 2000

Season chronology
- ← Previous; Season 1 Next → Season 3

Big Brother 2000 is the second season of the Dutch version of Big Brother, was again broadcast by Veronica. It lasted from 14 September till 30 December 2000 for a total of 108 days. The presenters were Beau van Erven Dorens and Esther Duller.

== Development ==
This season still had high ratings but was plagued by mediocre casting which resulted in a programme that rarely sparkled. Big Brother tried to push a romance between Georgie and Kim but it never really took off. Both Jolanda and Leo left prematurely after they had discovered that they had not impressed the public. It seemed they only wanted to use Big Brother as a stepstone to fame and a job on television. Desirée also regularly threatened to leave but never made that threat true. House pet Cindy, a Nubian goat, was removed by Big Brother because the stream-watchers complained that she was not properly cared for.

However, there were some good moments. The irritations around would-be artist Mohammed, Robin who could not hold his liquor, Annette who slept a night in the goat pen and the stolen kisses between housewife Hieke and surfboy Ferdi. Hilarious was the unexpected refusal of the idealistic Ed to leave during the live show. He thought he had been treated unfairly and only agreed to leave the next day, after being allowed to make a public statement.

== Housemates ==
Name	Age on entry	Hometown	Occupation	Day entered	Day exited	Result
Bianca Hagenbeek	33	Groningen	Secretary	1	109	Winner
Robin Veen	23	Houten	Sports instructor	1	109	Runner-up
Koos Wentink	47	Heerhugowaard	Driver	1	109	Walked (with ƒ50,000)
Georgie de Gee	26	Zoetermeer	Barman	1	107	Evicted
Hieke van der Heide	29	Stiens	Receptionist	1	104	Evicted
Desiree Stegeman	28	Someren	Assistant broker	1	100	Evicted
Ferdi Bonnet	22	Leiden	Salesman	1	86	Evicted
Kim Roben	19	Epe	Student	1	72	Evicted
Annet Stokkentreeff	42	Goor	Manager	1	58	Evicted
Ed Nypels	48	Scheveningen	-	30	44	Evicted
Miranda Huisman	29	Leidschendam	Executive board secretary	16	30	Evicted
Leo Piller	37	Callantsoog	Computer company owner	1	22	Walked
Rex van Iersel	36	Tilburg	Teacher	16	18	Evicted
Mohammed Ali Japur	30	Vlaardingen	Salesman	1	16	Evicted
Jolanda Kelderman	33	Haarlem	Shop owner	1	11	Walked

== Nominations table ==
Housemates nominate for two points (top of the box) and one point (bottom of the box) and the three or more Housemates with the most nomination points face the public vote.

	Week 2	Week 3	Week 4	Week 6	Week 8	Week 10	Week 12	Week 14	Week 15		Week 16 Final	Nomination points received
Bianca	Robin; Koos	Miranda	Koos; Miranda	Koos; Ed	Robin; Koos	Robin; Koos	Robin; Koos	Robin; Desiree	No; Nominations		Winner (Day 109)	8
Robin	Bianca; Ferdi	Miranda	Miranda; Ferdi	Ed; Ferdie	Bianca; Georgie	Georgie; Kim	Ferdi; Georgie	Desiree; Hieke	No; Nominations		Runner-up (Day 109)	34
Koos	Georgie; Bianca	Miranda	Georgie; Miranda	Georgie; Ed	Kim; Robin	Ferdi; Georgie	Ferdi; Georgie	Georgie; Desiree	No; Nominations		Walked (bribed) (Day 109)	27
Georgie	Koos; Annet	Miranda	Miranda; Robin	Robin; Ed	Annet; Robin	Robin; Desiree	Koos; Robin	Desiree; Heike	No; Nominations		Evicted (Day 107)	19
Hieke	Mohammed; Koos	Miranda	Miranda; Koos	Ed; Georgie	Kim; Desiree	Kim; Desiree	Koos; Desiree	Koos; Desiree	No; Nominations		Evicted (Day 104)	4
Desiree	Ferdi; Robin	Miranda	Miranda; Robin	Ed; Annet	Koos; Hieke	Kim; Georgie	Robin; Koos	Robin; Koos	Evicted (Day 100)			13
Ferdi	Mohammed; Jolanda	Miranda	Miranda; Annet	Ed; Annet	Annet; Robin	Robin; Desiree	Desiree; Koos	Evicted (Day 86)				15
Kim	Leo; Jolanda	Miranda	Miranda; Koos	Ed; Robin	Robin; Koos	Robin; Koos	Evicted (Day 72)					12
Annet	Mohammed; Bianca	Miranda	Ferdi; Kim	Ed; Georgie	Robin; Ferdi	Evicted (Day 58)						20
Ed	Not in House			Annet; Koos	Evicted (Day 44)							15
Miranda	Not in House	Nominated	Georgie; Bianca	Evicted (Day 30)								14
Leo	Kim; Ferdi	Miranda	Walked (Day 22)									2
Rex	Not in House	Nominated	Evicted (Day 18)									N/A
Mohammed	Hieke; Jolanda	Evicted (Day 16)										8
Jolanda	Mohammed; Bianca	Walked (Day 11)										3
Notes	none	1	none						2		3	
Nominated For Eviction	Bianca, Ferdi, Koos, Mohammed	Miranda, Rex	Georgie, Miranda, Koos	Annet, Ed, Georgie	Annet, Kim, Koos, Robin	Georgie, Kim, Robin	Ferdi, Koos, Robin	Desiree, Robin, Koos	Bianca, Georgie, Hieke, Koos, Robin		Bianca, Koos, Robin	
Walked	Jolanda	Leo	none								Koos	
Evicted	Mohammed; 53.1% to evict	Rex; Fewest votes to stay	Miranda; 42.9% to evict	Ed; 66.3% to evict	Annet; 39.2% to evict	Kim; 39.3% to evict	Ferdi; 68.5% to evict	Desiree; 80.7% to evict	Hieke; 25.2% to evict	Georgie; 36.6% to evict	Robin; 29.9% to win	
Survived	Koos; 21.2% Bianca; 16.8% Ferdi; 8.9%	Miranda; Most votes	Koos; 39.3% Georgie; 17.8%	Annet; 23.7% Georgie; 10.0%	Robin; 37.3% Koos; 14.4% Kim; 9.1%	Georgie; 30.5% Robin; 30.2%	Koos; 22.4% Robin; 9.1%	Koos; 10.9% Robin; 8.4%	Bianca; 22.8% Georgie; 18.7% Robin; 16.1% Koos; 14.5%	Robin; 24.8% Bianca; 21.7% Koos; 16.9%	Bianca; 34.9% to win	

=== Notes ===
- ^Note 1: Rex and Miranda entered the house on Day 16, shortly before Mohammed Ali's Eviction. Rex left the house after just two days following a housemate vote in which Miranda was chosen to stay.
- ^Note 2: In the penultimate week there was a Double Eviction - one on Day 103 and one on Day 107. All the housemates automatically faced the vote, and it was a vote to evict.
- ^Note 3 For the final night, all three surviving housemates faced the public vote to win. However, shortly before the winner was announced Koos voluntarily left the Big Brother House. Housemates were offered 50,000 guilders to leave the house should they wish to do so. Koos, saying that he thought he had no chance whatsoever of winning, took the offer of the money and left. Ironically, Koos had the most votes (35.2%) and would have won. The Housemate with the next highest number of votes, Bianca, was announced as the winner instead.
