= Ruud de Wild =

Dutch radio host

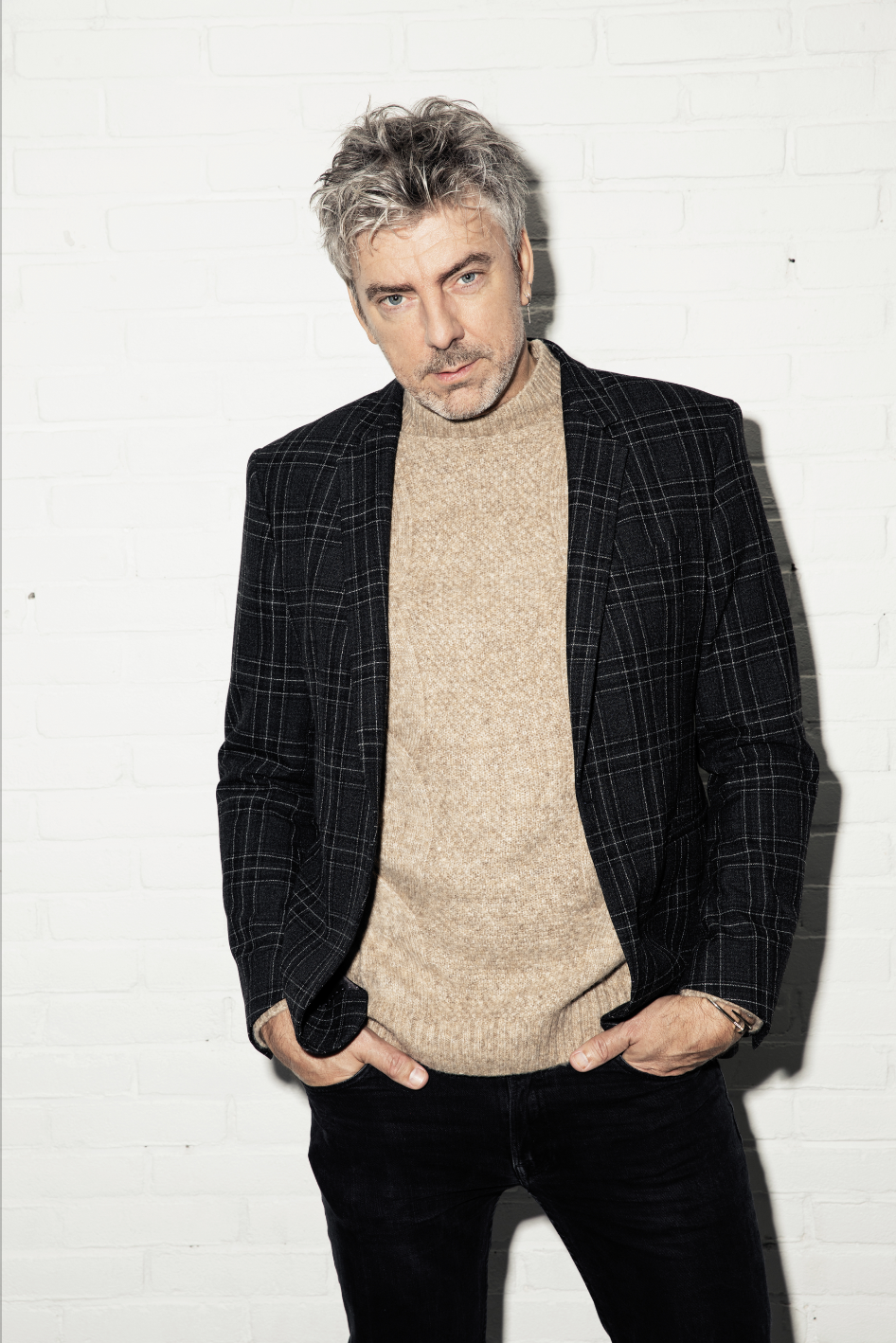
- Ruud de Wild
- Born: Rudolf Alexander de Wild; April 24, 1969 (age 57); Netherlands
- Occupation: Radio personality
- Known for: Witnessing the assassination of Pim Fortuyn

Rudolf Alexander de Wild (born 24 April 1969) is a Dutch radio host. He is also a former DJ, VJ and was one of the faces of the now-defunct television network Talpa.

On 6 May 2002, when he worked for radio station 3FM, he interviewed Pim Fortuyn. After the interview De Wild and Fortuyn stepped outside where De Wild witnessed the assassination of Fortuyn. De Wild stated that he narrowly avoided being shot himself and suffered from trauma and PTSD as a result of witnessing Fortuyn's murder.

In 2004, De Wild started his show Ruuddewild.nl on Radio 538. He got a timeslot between 16.00 and 19.00. At that time he also worked for the television channel Talpa of John de Mol Jr.. He presented Big Brother 5 together with Bridget Maasland.

== Conflict with Radio 538 ==
In the summer of 2007, De Wild did not return to present his program on Radio 538 after his holiday. Official statements said De Wild was suffering from burnout, but rumours circulated that he had tried to break out of his contract with Radio 538 because he felt that he was not getting enough creative freedom from the station. His show Ruuddewild.nl went on without him, and was presented by Lindo Duvall, another deejay at Radio 538.

Because the show was still called Ruuddewild.nl, and Radio 538 repeatedly stated that De Wild really was ill, it appeared De Wild was going to return. But on 25 October 2007, Ruuddewild.nl disappeared from Radio 538's schedule and was replaced by a nameless afternoon show, still presented by Lindo Duvall. Radio 538 then stated it had terminated De Wild's contract.

== Return to Dutch radio ==
On 10 March 2008, Ruud de Wild started presenting the morning-show on Dutch radio station Q-Music, again called Ruuddewild.nl. Sidekick on this new show is Jeroen Kijk in de Vegte, who worked with De Wild before at 3FM, and producer is Martijn Zuurveen. In 2010, Ruud de Wild went back to Radio 538. His contract was terminated in April 2015, when 538 suddenly announced his slot was to be taken over by the Coen en Sander Show. De Wild now works for NPO Radio 2.

In December 2020, De Wild drew criticism for pronouncing the title of the song "Niggas in Paris" uncensored while presenting the Top 2000.

== Personal ==
In 2019 he had a relationship with fashion designer Olcay Gulsen. The couple separated in 2023.
