= The Golden Cage (TV series) =

Dutch reality television series

Coordinates: 52°14′22″N 5°14′07″E

- Dutch: De Gouden Kooi
- Genre: Reality television
- Created by: John de Mol; Patrick Scholtze; Bart Römer; Paul Römer
- Presented by: Linda de Mol; Bridget Maasland; Rutger Castricum
- Country of origin: Netherlands
- Original language: Dutch
- No. of seasons: 1

Production
- Running time: 23 minutes
- Production company: Talpa

Original release
- Network: Tien (2006 - 2007); RTL 5 (2007 - 2008)
- Release: October 1, 2006 – May 31, 2008

De Gouden Kooi (The Golden Cage) is a Dutch reality competition that premiered in 2006 on Tien. The series was based on an early iteration of what would eventually become Endemol's format Big Brother.

== Synopsis ==
The first Dutch episode on 23 September 2006 had slightly fewer than 1 million viewers (10-15% market share, it was programmed right after the Dutch Eredivisie football show, which always attracts many viewers); the two subsequent episodes received around 500,000 viewers (5-10% market share). Thereafter, the audience dropped to about 350,000 . The setting was a €2 million capital villa in Eemnes. After a few months the uglier sides of the participants came to light. A lot of millionaires were constantly plotting how to get rid of the others. Natasia, who had left behind her two young kids, refused to return home when her boyfriend who cared for them asked her to. She wanted to reach her goals first: a drivers license and breast enhancement surgery. One participant regularly ordered the use of (masked) prostitutes. Some participants started (loveless) sexual relationships, which led to jealousy and much verbal abuse. Another contestant, Nena, had to be disqualified on 2 February 2007 after she kicked another participant's leg. 2 days later, Nathanael kicked Huub and they both got into a fight. After much discussion between the directors, Huub got back into the house because he didn't physically attack Nathanael. On 30 November 2007, millionaire Dennis was about to be voted off by all of the other contestants in the house and would not be replaced by another contestant, during the vote, Dennis grabbed a chair and demolished a camera in the house, causing him to be disqualified, but also so he would be replaced with another millionaire.

== Format ==
The housemates live in a villa, and whoever stays the longest gets to keep the house and win money. Each time someone is eliminated the prize money rises. Contestants can only leave voluntarily or be eliminated by unanimous decision by the other contestants.

== Criticism ==
The concept has been heavily criticized. Because there are no nominations or votings off like in Big Brother, psychologists assume that harassment and bullying will be the only ways of getting rid of one's rivals and obtaining the reward. This would provide a very wrong role model for the youth of the Netherlands. Murray Stone therefore promised to introduce a bully referee. The producers rather expect that housemates will leave if they experience homesickness or family-complications will occur (death, birth, or sickness).

== Contestants ==
Contestant	Birthdate	Place of residence	Period	Reason for departure
Jaap Amesz	6 September 1982	Brielle	26 February 2007 – 22 May 2008 (451 days)	Winner of The Golden Cage. (Prize: €1,351,000.)
Brian Kubatz	14 April 1981	Almere	23 September 2006 – 22 May 2008 (607 days)	Final of The Golden Cage. Runner up
Amanda Balk	15 December 1987	Amsterdam	1 February 2007 – 22 May 2008 (476 days)	Final of The Golden Cage. Third place
Huub van Ballegooy	25 December 1981	Oldenzaal	2 October 2006; 11 December 2006 – 4 February 2007; 9 February 2007 – 22 May 2008 (523 days)	Evicted for violence, but allowed to return, Final of The Golden Cage. Fourth place
Claire Recourt	5 January 1984	Tilburg	5 January 2008 – 15 May 2008 (131 days)	Accepted €25,000 to leave the game
Lieke de Lange	10 October 1983	Hilversum	2 May 2007 – 23 January 2008 (266 days)	Walked out
Nadia Derbane	11 June 1985	Amsterdam	29 June 2007 – 3 December 2007 (157 days)	Walked out
Dennis Bax	23 October 1982	Alphen aan den Rijn	21 June 2007 – 29 November 2007 (161 days)	Violence
Natasia Blank	26 February 1974	Almere	23 September 2006 – 26 July 2007 (306 days)	Evicted
Eric 't Mannetje	19 July 1981	Leiden	13 February 2007 – 19 June 2007 (126 days)	Walked out
Nicolaas Niels Streefkerk	27 November 1967	Amsterdam	23 September 2006 – 2 November 2006; 9 April 2007 – 17 May 2007 (78 days)	Walked out Evicted
Sylvia van der Sluijs	11 August 1977	Barcelona	2 October 2006 – 29 April 2007 (209 days)	Walked out
Bart Driessen	25 May 1979	Amsterdam	23 September 2006 – 22 February 2007 (152 days)	Walked out
Ilona Monsanto	30 July 1961	Amsterdam	23 September 2006 – 5 February 2007 (135 days)	Walked out
Nena Lammerts van Bueren	31 March 1987	Landsmeer	23 September 2006 – 1 February 2007 (131 days)	Violence
Eveline Klaassen	10 October 1981	Ermelo	25 September 2006 – 11 December 2006 (77 days)	Walked out
Nathanael Heres	31 May 1972	Amsterdam	22 November 2006 – 4 February 2007 (74 days)	Violence
Stephan Willing	22 August 1964	Bussum	25 September 2006 – 30 November 2006 (66 days)	Evicted
Angelique de Bruin-Tilstra	13 November 1961	Lelystad	25 September 2006 – 3 November 2006 (39 days)	Evicted

== Guest players ==
Contestant	Place of residence	Period
Luc	Tilburg	30 September 2007 – 29 January 2008
Janice	Amsterdam	12 November 2007 – 19 November 2007
Selene	Tilburg	23 November 2007 – 16 February 2008
Jeroen	Ghent	5 December 2007 – 6 December 2007
Roekshana	The Hague	6 December 2007 – 8 December 2007
Mike	Amsterdam	19 December 2007 – 29 March 2008
Emin Pariz Saidoff	Rotterdam	12 February 2008 – 18 February 2008
Christina Princess Saidoff	Rotterdam	12 February 2008 – 18 February 2008
Barry	Amsterdam	4 March 2008 – 9 March 2008
Nicole	Vlijmen	5 March 2008 – 10 March 2008
Nienke	Apeldoorn	10 March 2008 – 14 March 2008
Ricardo a.k.a. Rachel	Amsterdam	14 March 2008 – 20 May 2008
