= Bridget Maasland =

Dutch VJ, television presenter and producer

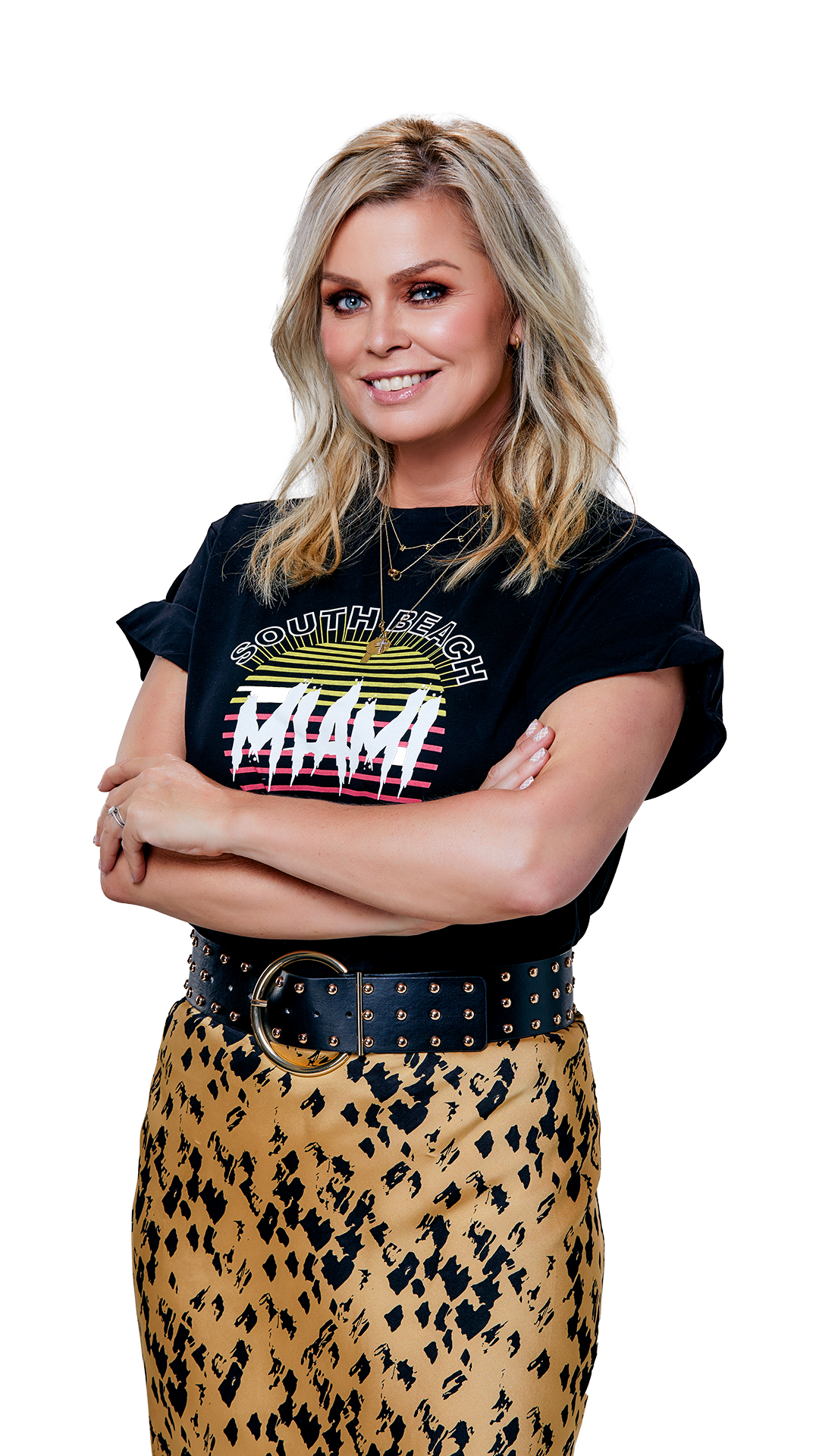
- Bridget Maasland in 2006
- Born: 9 November 1974 (age 51); The Hague, Netherlands
- Occupations: VJ, television presenter, producer
- Years active: 1993–present

Bridget Maasland (born 9 November 1974) is a Dutch VJ, television presenter and producer.

== Career ==
She worked as a model and appeared on the catwalk in fashionshows for children. Her debut on television was a commercial for fruit as a healthy alternative to sweets.

Later, Maasland became a professional model, working in Barcelona. She returned in 1993 to the Netherlands to become a showdancer and assistant in the Veronica show, Man O Woman.

She started working for TMF where she gained popularity as a VJ and presenter. Five years later, she left the music station as one of the last presenters of the first wave to start working for the Dutch National TV station BNN. BNN is especially targeted at a young audience, and her sexy profile fitted the bill perfectly. She presented shows like Lijst 0 (politics with a sexy twist, together with Katja Schuurman), Een Beetje Bridget, BNN at Work, Neuken doe je zo! (explicit sex education), The national IQ test, The Bridget Triangle, BNN presenteert AVRO's Sterrenslag and Katja vs. Bridget.

For a more universal audience, she interviewed the teams in both series of the Dutch version of Robot Wars (the role Philippa Forrester and, when she was off, Julia Reed and Jayne Middlemiss, had in the main (British) version of the Robot Combat game show). In the first series a team named Blue, who dyed their skin blue prior to the event, communicated only by handing notes to her, or with their mouthpiece.

After a couple of years with BNN, she decided in 2005 to move over to the newly formed commercial station, Talpa of John de Mol Jr., where she gained the possibility to produce television shows herself. However, her first job was to present Big Brother 5 together with Ruud de Wild. A year later she presented Big Brother 6 on her own.

In May 2006, she appeared in the Dutch edition of Playboy, with the proceeds going to the Dutchpuppy charity.

Other shows have included her own production, Je leven in de steigers (based on Extreme Home Makeover), the news program NSE, Woef! (own production about dog training), the talk show Late Night met Maasland & Geel and Hoe word ik een Gooische Vrouw? (a satirical take on how to become and behave ladylike).

In the end of 2007, Bridget moved over to the commercial station RTL Nederland because Talpa officially ceased to exist. On 27 August Bridget's new show Hoe Word Ik Een New Yorkse Vrouw? started. It has the same concept as "Hoe Word Ik Een Gooische Vrouw?" She also replaced Renate Verbaan in the second season of Beauty & de Nerd.[1]. Because Bridget and het boyfriend Pepijn Padberg were expecting their first child in 2008, she came with the production "Hoe word ik mama in Amsterdam-Zuid?.[2]". Since 2007 Bridget regularly presents the tabloid RTL Boulevard, where she replaces Albert Verlinde. She also presents the programma Lekker Slim!.

On 17 December 2009, it was announced that Bridget had broken up with Pepijn Padberg.[3] From September 2010 until February 2011 [4] she was going steady with Johnny de Mol. In September 2011, it was announced that she has a relationship with company lawyer Pieter van Schaik who is ten years her junior. However, on Monday 16 April 2012 on RTL Boulevard TV she announced that she had terminated this relationship.

From 3 January 2011, Bridget Maasland has been acting the bitchy Carla in the BNN-series Walhalla. At RTL 5 she is one of the presenters of the new program Wie is de Reisleider?, that was seen from January on.

On 21 May 2011, Maasland was laureated with the Amsterdam Fashion Award during the Amsterdam Fashion Gala.

In 2022, she appeared in the television show The Masked Singer.

In 2025, she appeared in the 25th season of the television show Wie is de Mol?.

== Biography ==
- Bridget Maasland at IMDb
