= RTL 24 =

Netherlands television channel

- Country: Netherlands
- Broadcast area: Netherlands
- Headquarters: Hilversum, Netherlands

Ownership
- Owner: RTL Group
- Parent: RTL Nederland
- Sister channels: RTL 4 RTL 5 RTL 7 RTL 8 RTL Z RTL Lounge; RTL Crime; RTL Telekids

History
- Launched: 5 June 2008
- Closed: 19 January 2012

Links
- Website: www.rtl24.nl

RTL 24 started as a mobile TV news channel on 5 June 2008. It was available through KPN DVB-H. Its broadcast as a mobile TV channel stopped when KPN ceased its DVB-H services on 1 June 2011.

After a short break, RTL 24 re-launched as a mobile app for smart phones, tablet computers and other mobile devices in November 2011. On 19 January 2012 the app changed into RTL Nieuws 365 and therefore the brand RTL 24 discontinued.
