= Veronica (media) =

Brand of successive Dutch broadcasters

Veronica is a brand name of successive Dutch commercial and public radio and television broadcasters. It began its life as an offshore radio station, Radio Veronica, on 17 May 1960. The name comes from its project title VRON – Vrije Radio Omroep Nederland (Dutch for 'Free Radio Broadcasting Netherlands'). "Free" was a reference to the laws at the time that did not allow commercial radio broadcasters to operate from a location within the (land) territory of the Netherlands.

Though Veronica's appeal and power have waned, most of the Dutch commercial radio and television landscape has been formed by Veronica and its spin-offs.

== Television ==
=== Veronica's years as public broadcaster (1976–1995) ===
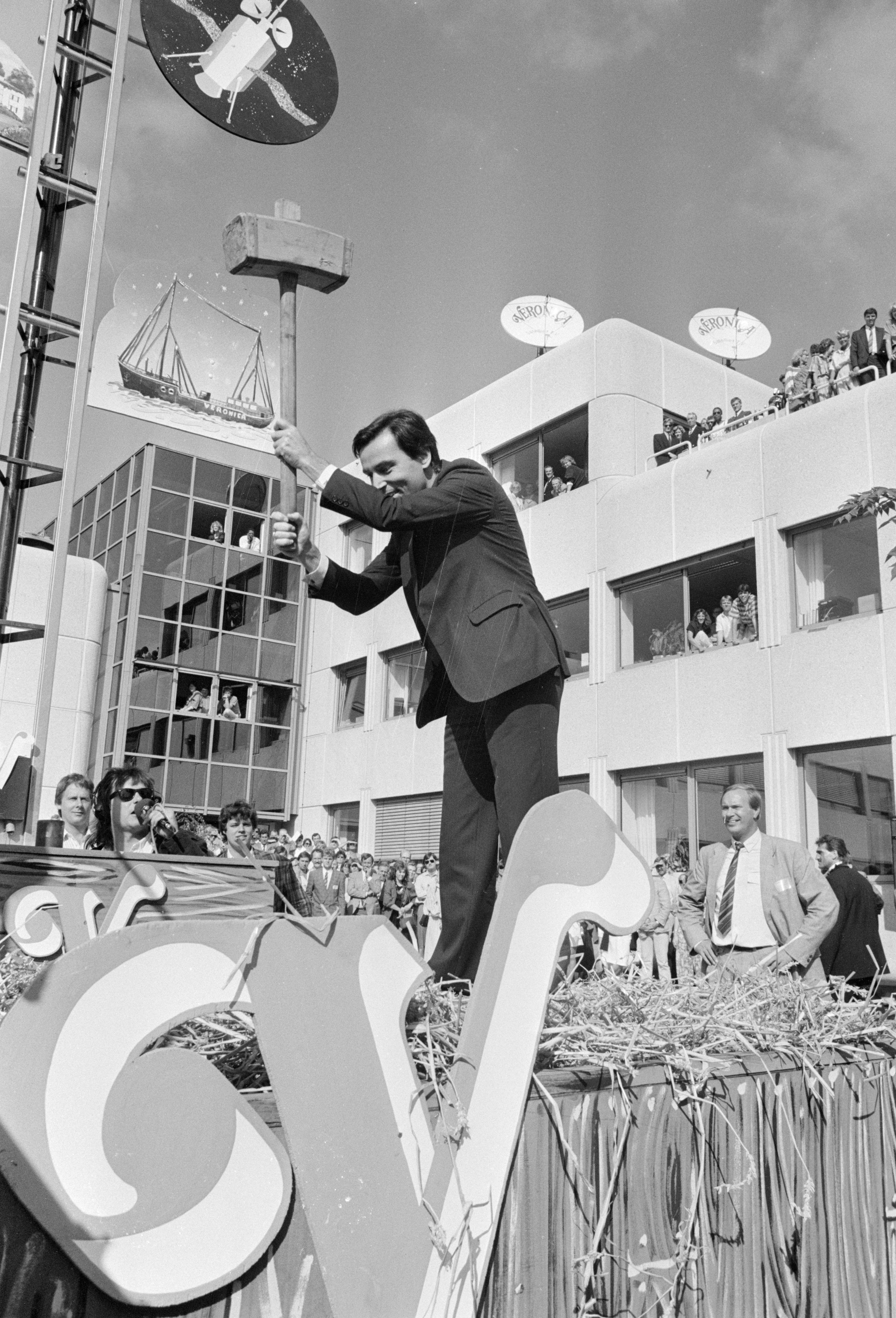
Elco Brinkman operating a high striker to celebrate the opening of Veronica's headquarters in Hilversum, August 1987

The Association resulted from a pirate radio station, Radio Veronica, which broadcast from a ship on international waters off the coast of the Netherlands between 1960 and 1974. The wave appearing in the logo hearkens back to that time.

After the pirate activities became legally impossible (31 August 1974), Veronica transformed itself into the Veronica Broadcasting Organization (Veronica Omroep Organisatie, short VOO), enabling it to gain a legal radio and television license within the public broadcasting system. It finally was given a license on 28 December 1975. The first television broadcast of Veronica was on 21 April 1976. Within a decade, it became one of the largest public broadcasters and the trademark was tested as being more popular than Coca-Cola.

In 1990, it was revealed that Veronica used ƒ 7-10 million to illegally finance RTL 4, which was initially named RTL Veronique. Veronica lost its appeal case in 1993 and had the risk of being suspended for seven weeks from the public system due to improper management.

=== With Holland Media Groep (1995–2001) ===
In 1995 the Veronica Association gave up public broadcasting and entered a joint venture with CLT (parent company of RTL 4 and RTL 5), VNU and Endemol called the Holland Media Groep, running three mostly successful national TV-stations and three less successful national radio stations.

BNN became a public broadcasting association as a part of the Netherlands Public Broadcasting system and replaced Veronica on 15 August 1997, after Veronica gave up public broadcasting and entered a joint-venture with CLT. BNN first stood for the Brutaal News Network (Flagrant News Network). The name was later changed to Bart's Neverending Network after founder Bart de Graaff's death at age 35 from kidney failure caused by a rejection of a kidney transplant he received in 1999. Conflicts let to the dissolution of this co-operation in Spring of 2001. RTL rebranded Veronica into Yorin which would finally be rebranded into RTL 7.

=== Current commercial era (2003–present) ===
In 2002–2003, the Veronica Association learned that it could not realise radio and TV in a stand-alone setting. In 2001 SBS Broadcasting B.V., then the Dutch branch of the SBS Broadcasting Group, already bought the Dutch TV channel Fox 8 from the News Corporation and renamed it into V8 in anticipation of Veronica. However, the negotiations between the Veronica Association and SBS Broadcasting were not going as planned and no agreement could be set. In the course of 2002 Veronica cooperated with MTV Networks Benelux and started time-sharing with MTV's Kindernet. The ratings were poor though. At the end of 2002 the Association is even talking with HMG again. Eventually Veronica Association closed a deal with SBS, and V8 was rebranded as Veronica on 20 September 2003.
