= RTL Group =

Entertainment company

RTL Group S.A.
- Logo used since 2021
- Formerly: Compagnie Luxembourgeoise de Radiodiffusion (1931–1954); Compagnie Luxembourgeoise de Télédiffusion (1954–1997); CLT-UFA (1997–2000)
- Type: Public
- Traded as: FWB: RRTL; LuxSE: RTLL; MDAX component (RRTL); LuxX Index component (RTLL)
- ISIN: LU0061462528
- Industry: Mass media
- Predecessor: Société Luxembourgeoise d'Études Radiophoniques (1929–1931)
- Founded: 30 May 1931; 95 years ago
- Headquarters: Kirchberg, Luxembourg; Cologne, North Rhine-Westphalia
- Area served: Europe; Worldwide (via Fremantle)
- Key people: Martin Taylor (chairman); Clément Schwebig (CEO); Thomas Rabe (Executive Director); Alexander von Torklus (CFO)
- Products: Television; Radio; Streaming; Content production Digital services
- Revenue: €6.0 billion (2025)
- Operating income: €243 million (2025)
- Net income: €1 billion (2025)
- Total assets: €10.5 billion (2025)
- Number of employees: 15,768 (2025)
- Parent: Bertelsmann Capital Holding (75.086%); RTL Group (2.329%); Publicly traded (22.585%)
- Divisions: RTL Deutschland; Groupe M6 (49.3%); Fremantle; RTL Hungary; Atresmedia (18.65%)
- Subsidiaries: Sky Deutschland
- Website: rtl.com

RTL Group S.A. ("Radio Télévision Luxembourg") is a Luxembourgish-German international media conglomerate, with another corporate office in Cologne, North Rhine-Westphalia. The company operates 86 television channels and 42 radio stations in Germany, France and other European countries. It also offers national streaming platforms, content productions and a range of digital services. Important segments of RTL Group are RTL Deutschland, Groupe M6 and Fremantle.

The company in its present form was established by Bertelsmann, Groupe Bruxelles Lambert (GBL), and Pearson plc in 2000. As of 2025 Bertelsmann, a conglomerate based in the German city of Gütersloh owns 75% of the shares in the company, after holding a stake of more than 90% in the past. RTL Group is one of a total of eight divisions of Bertelsmann: It is responsible for one third of its revenue and a large share of its operating profit.

It is one of the founding members of the European Broadcasting Union.

== History ==
Logo of RTL Group used from 2000 until 2021

=== Historical background ===
The roots of RTL Group date back to the 1920s. The company itself was established in 1931 as the Compagnie Luxembourgeoise de Radiodiffusion (known as CLR for short). It was one of the world's first private broadcasting companies. After the Second World War, the company ventured into the world of television broadcasting. It was renamed Compagnie Luxembourgeoise de Télédiffusion (CLT) to reflect this new service in 1954. Under the name RTL (for Radio Télévision Luxembourg), it went on to provide its private broadcasting services in several European countries. When the European media markets were liberalised in the 1980s, television became increasingly important and started to overtake radio.

In the 1980s, Belgian and French media companies made up the majority of the shareholders of CLR and CLT. The following decades witnessed repeated conflicts for domination within the company and among its subsidiaries. In the 1990s, Bertelsmann ultimately came out on top after having gradually increased its stake in the German television channel RTL. Following a legal dispute with RTL/CLT, Bertelsmann announced plans to merge the television businesses of UFA to form the joint venture CLT-UFA in April 1996. A merger agreement was signed on 8 July 1996. It was approved by the CLT board of directors on 5 December, and the formation of CLT-UFA was completed on 14 January 1997. As a result, German television channels such as RTL Television and VOX and international broadcasting services, including M6 in France, were all brought together under one roof.

=== Growth and stock market launch ===
CLT-UFA not only grew organically but also increased in size due to a number of acquisitions. In the year 2000, Bertelsmann and Pearson announced plans to merge their television, radio, and production activities. The two companies joined forces to create RTL Group, Europe's leading network of television channels and radio stations with a global content business, which was rebranded FremantleMedia in 2001 (now called Fremantle). This merger was designed to provide a strong European response to U.S. media dominance.

RTL Group was first listed on the London Stock Exchange, the Brussels Stock Exchange, and the Luxembourg Stock Exchange on 26 July 2000. The existing shell of Audiofina, which was already a listed company, was used to simplify the administrative effort involved in the stock market launch. The issue price of the RTL Group share was calculated based on the closing prices of Audiofina in Luxembourg and Brussels. The RTL Group share consequently replaced the Audiofina listing.

=== Acquisition by Bertelsmann ===
Although Bertelsmann initially only held a minority share in RTL Group, the German conglomerate managed by Thomas Middelhoff set its sights on playing a leading role within the group. After exchanging shares with the Groupe Bruxelles Lambert (GBL) in 2001, Bertelsmann achieved its goal of becoming the majority shareholder of RTL Group and thus secured a leading position in the European television market.

Over the years, Bertelsmann increased its stake in RTL Group to more than 90%. Bertelsmann's initial aim was to acquire full ownership of RTL Group to reduce administrative costs, but this plan failed in 2007 due to uncertainties in Luxembourg law. The conglomerate responded by altering its strategy, and in 2013, it sold a minority interest in RTL Group on the Frankfurt Stock Exchange to finance the growth of Bertelsmann and especially its digital transformation. Media reports responded positively to the secondary listing of RTL Group and the resulting availability of shares open to external investors.

In July 2005, RTL Group announced it had signed an agreement with Untied Business Media to acquire the latter's 35.4% stake in the British television broadcasting network Five that would bring full control of the British televisio broadcasing channel as United Business Media would exit the televisiom broadcasting business as Five became RTL Group's fully-owned British television broadcasting network. The acquisition had been completed a month later in August of that year.

=== Recent developments ===
RTL Group was already responsible for a large part of the revenue and profit of Bertelsmann in 2001. In the new structure of Bertelsmann, introduced in 2016, the company maintained its position as an important division.

In December 2018, RTL Group announced it had merged its Berlin-based in-house digital content production company & multi-channel network Divimore with the digital storytelling production division of RTL Group's fellow German entertainment film & television studio UFA, UFA X, alongside the latter's Berlin & Colonge-based production officies into the streaming platform Divimore, UFA X's co-managing director & CFO of UFA, Tobias Schiwek, had joined the Berlin-based digital content production studio Divimore

In April 2019, Bertelsmann chief executive officer Thomas Rabe also became chairman and chief executive officer of RTL Group. Under his leadership, the company pursued the objective of strengthening its core businesses, establishing local streaming services and further developing advertising technologies.

In early 2025, Comcast began negotiations with the RTL Group regarding the acquisition of Sky Deutschland. In June 2025, the RTL Group announced the acquisition of Sky Deutschland for €150 million. In April 2026, the European Commission approved the RTL Group’s acquisition of Sky Deutschland without imposing any conditions. The transaction was completed on 1 June 2026. The transaction is regarded as one of the largest mergers in the European television and streaming market, and the merger will create a media company in the German-speaking region with a combined total of around 12 million paying subscribers to the RTL+, Sky and Wow services.

In May 2026, Clément Schwebig became Chief Executive Officer of RTL Group.

== Corporate affairs ==
RTL Group S.A. is the parent company of the entire corporate group. Its legal form is a société anonyme, a public limited company under Luxembourg law. It was entered into the Luxembourg Trade Register on 29 March 1973. The company's main corporate objective is to develop audio-visual media and to lead and manage other companies active in the same field.

The key indicators of the RTL Group are (as at the financial year ending 31 December):

| Year | Revenue (€m) | Net Profit (€m) | Number of employees |
|---|---|---|---|
| 2017 | 6,373 | 739 | 11,011 |
| 2018 | 6,505 | 668 | 10,809 |
| 2019 | 6,651 | 754 | 10,809 |
| 2020 | 6,017 | 492 | 10,598 |
| 2021 | 6,637 | 1,301 | 10,861 |
| 2022 | 7,224 | 673 | 12,975 |
| 2023 | 6,234 | 467 | 12,835 |
| 2024 | 6,254 | 460 | 12,736 |
| 2025 | 6,018 | 979 | 15,768 |

In the 2025, the revenue mainly came from TV advertising (36.4%) and content production (30.4%).

=== Listing ===
RTL Group S.A. currently has a share capital of €191,845,074. It is divided into 154,742,806 shares without nominal value, which are traded on the Luxembourg and Frankfurt Stock Exchanges. RTL Group S.A. shares are included in the German MDAX, a stock index for midcap companies. They are also included in the SXMP, a sector index for the European media industry.

Bertelsmann holds more than 75% of the shares in RTL Group S.A. The second-largest shareholder is Silchester International Investors, a British investment company based in London, which has a stake of around 5%. This shareholding forms part of the group's free float, which has a stable value of between 20 and 25%.

=== Management ===
The highest authority of RTL Group S.A. is its board of directors, in which the power to manage and control the group's business is vested. The Board of Directors has 13 members; there are currently eleven men and two women serving on the Board. Martin Taylor is the chairman of the board of directors; the other members are Clément Schwebig, Thomas Rabe, Alexander von Torklus, Carsten Coesfeld, Thomas Coesfeld, Pernille Erenbjerg, Elmar Heggen, Rolf Hellermann, Immanuel Hermreck, Guillaume de Posch, Jean-Louis Schiltz and Lauren Zalaznick.

The operational business of RTL Group is headed by Clément Schwebig (Chief Executive Officer, CEO) and Alexander von Torklus (Chief Financial Officer, CFO). Together with Thomas Rabe (Executive Director), they form the executive committee of RTL Group S.A., which is supported by the operations management committee. The management boards of RTL Group are based in Luxembourg and Cologne, North Rhine-Westphalia.

=== Corporate headquarters ===
The headquarters of RTL Group, according to trade law, is located in the so-called "RTL City", which is located at Boulevard Pierre Frieden in the Kirchberg district in Luxembourg City. Bertelsmann initially planned to sell the complex and lease it back in 2017 but ultimately decided to delay the transaction for an indefinite period. Besides the Luxembourg headquarters, there is another corporate office located in Deutz, Cologne, North Rhine-Westphalia.

== Divisions ==
RTL Group operates television channels, radio stations, streaming platforms, content production, a range of digital services and advertising sales. The main segments of RTL Group are RTL Deutschland, Groupe M6, Fremantle, Sky Deutschland, and formerly RTL Nederland. We Are Era, RTL Hungary, RTL Luxembourg, Bedrock and other businesses are part of another segment, as is the Group's minority interest in Atresmedia, a leading Spanish media company.

=== RTL Deutschland ===
RTL Deutschland is based in Cologne and operates the free-to-air channels RTL Television, VOX (entertainment), RTLup, RTL Nitro, VOXup, and ntv (news), along with holding a significant stake in RTLZWEI. Most of these channels have Austrian and Swiss versions for the insertion of nation-specific advertising. It also offers pay-TV channels such as RTL Crime, RTL Living, RTL Passion and GEO Television. The company additionally operates a streaming service under the name RTL+ (formerly TV Now).

Advertising space for RTL Deutschland is sold by the advertising company Ad Alliance, which also works with other Bertelsmann companies and further partners. RTL Deutschland is also part of Bertelsmann's Content Alliance.

=== Groupe M6 ===
The headquarters of the Groupe M6 media holding company are based in Neuilly-sur-Seine in Paris. The company operates the television channels 6ter, M6 and W9, the channels Paris Première and Téva, as well as children's channel Gulli. These channels are joined by radio stations such as RTL Radio France, RTL2 and Fun Radio and the streaming service M6+. Salto, a joint streaming service by France Télévisions, Groupe M6 and TF1, was tested and shut down in March 2023. Groupe M6 subsidiaries M6 Film, M6 Studio, SND and Studio 89 Productions are among the best-known production and film rights companies in the French-speaking world. Although RTL Group only owns a minority interest in Groupe M6, it controls the listed company and consolidates it in its balance sheet. On 18 May 2021, Groupe M6 and Groupe TF1 announced that they had begun negotiations to merge. On 16 September 2022, the merger was officially abandoned. Afterwards, a sale of Groupe M6 was considered at one point, but on 3 October 2022, RTL Group confirmed that they wouldn't be selling their stake in Groupe M6.

=== Fremantle ===
The head office of Fremantle (formerly FremantleMedia) is located in London. The company, which operates in 28 territories, creates, produces and distributes content for broadcasters of RTL Group (including TV channels and streaming platforms) and other clients, for example Amazon Prime Video and Netflix. It not only produces films and series (for example Deutschland 86) but also shows. Fremantle has attracted global attention with its casting shows such as Got Talent and Idols, which have been adapted in a multitude of countries worldwide, and owns popular game shows like The Price Is Right and Family Feud.

== Former divisions ==
RTL Group or its predecessors previously operated or owned stakes in other TV channels or channel families, including RTL Belgium, RTL9, Channel 5, REN TV, RTL Croatia, RTL 7, TVI and RTL Nederland.

=== RTL Belgium ===
The headquarters of RTL Belgium are in Brussels in the so-called "RTL House". Core of its business activities are the television channels RTL-TVI and related channels such as RTL Club and RTL Plug. These also have licences issued by Luxembourg, causing some issues. RTL Belgium additionally operates radio stations such as Bel RTL. Almost all of its services are provided in French. In June 2021, it was announced that RTL Belgium would be sold for €250 million to DPG Media and Rossel, pending regulatory approval. The sale was effectuated on 31 March 2022. In March 2023, RTL Belgium renounced its Luxembourgish status to become fully Belgian.

=== RTL Nederland ===
RTL Nederland (formerly the Holland Media Group) is a Dutch company based in Hilversum. Its television channels RTL 4, RTL 5, RTL 7, RTL 8, RTL Z, RTL Crime, RTL Lounge and RTL Telekids all have licences issued by Luxembourg. RTL Nederland also operates the streaming service Videoland.

In June 2021 Talpa Network and RTL Nederland announced an intent to merge; RTL was to hold 70% and Talpa was to hold 30% in the new company, pending approval by the Dutch ACM and the European Commission. In January 2022 the Netherlands Authority for Consumers and Markets stated that it could not approve the merger as of yet and that further investigation to the consequences of price, quality and innovation was necessary. On 30 January 2023 the Authority announced that it would not approve the merger, citing that the merged company would become too powerful. In December 2022, it was announced that the RTL Group was considering selling its Dutch TV station RTL Nederland.

After the merger with Talpa failed, it was officially announced in December 2023 that RTL Group was selling RTL Nederland for 1.1 billion euros to DPG Media. The acquisition of RTL Nederland to DPG Media was approved on 27 June. The sale was effectuated on 1 July.

== Controversies ==
Observers have repeatedly criticised RTL Group for having "missed the boat in the streaming era". Thomas Rabe, chairman and chief executive officer of Bertelsmann, has responded to this criticism by campaigning for the deregulation of the highly competitive television market to enable the establishment of national alternatives to the "giants of Silicon Valley".

== See also ==
- European News Exchange
- Radio Luxembourg
