= Mariska Hulscher =

Dutch TV presenter (born 1964)

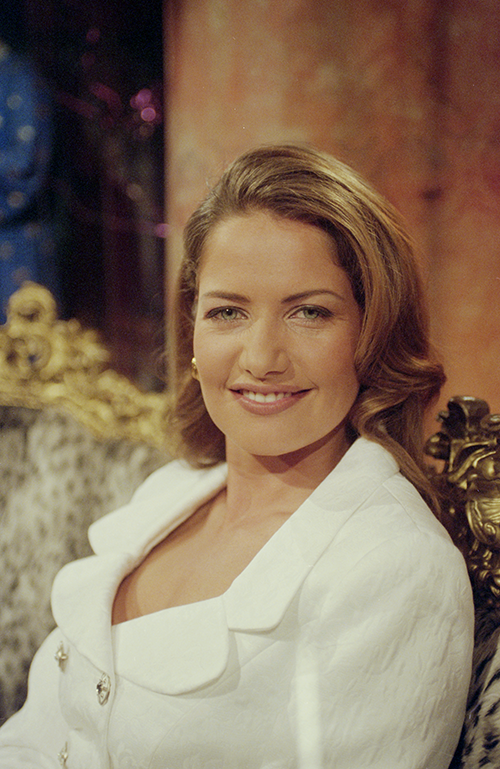
Mariska Hulscher in 1996

Mariska Hulscher (born 8 March 1964, in Delft) is a Dutch TV presenter who worked for the NCRV, RTL 4, and RTL 5. Hulscher is also a columnist for a variety of magazines, and works as a divorce coach.

== Education, career ==
After getting her VWO diploma, Hulscher studied law at the Leiden University, graduating in 1989. After her studies she worked in marketing and management, and was editor of various consumer advocacy magazines.

She was discovered for television by Fons van Westerloo, then director of programming for RTL 5, one of the Dutch commercial channels. Hulscher presented TV shows, mainly on fashion and beauty, for RTL 4 and RTL 5 (the RTL group's second channel in the Netherlands), then left for Veronica, and in 1998 moved to the Protestant public broadcaster NCRV. In 2002 she returned to RTL 4 where she presented, until 2006, the fashion program LookingGood.

In 2009 Hulscher, who by then had become a relationship coach, published her first book on coaching, Ja, ik wil!.

== Personal life ==
From 1993 to 2002 she was married to Bert Hulscher, whose last name she kept. They had two daughters. In 2006 she married TV director Ary Schouwenaar; the marriage lasted for two months. Media coverage afterward was scathing, since Hulscher refused to comment on the divorce though before the marriage she courted media attention, according to Trouw, with the fashion magazine Jacky getting an exclusive on the wedding photos, and gossip magazine Story paying for the honeymoon (to Bali) in exchange for the photographs. In the aftermath Hulscher was severely criticized in the media and called awful names, and the affair was a hot item on RTL Boulevard and other shows.

== Television career ==
- Lijn 5 (1994, RTL 5)
- Het Staatslot op Locatie (1994, RTL 4)
- 't Is Me Ook Wat Moois (1995, RTL 5)
- Mariska (1995-1996, Veronica)
- De BankGiroLoterijRace (1996-1997, Veronica)
- Veronica Goes Latin (1996, Veronica)
- Rechtbank deze Week (1997, RTL 5)
- Gestrand (1998-1999, NCRV)
- Police, camera, action (1998, NCRV)
- Ja, Natuurlijk - Vogelparadijzen (1998, NCRV)
- Hoera, een Kind!? (1999-2000, NCRV)
- De Jury (1999-2000, NCRV)
- Galaprogramma 75 Jaar NCRV (1999, NCRV)
- Wat zegt de Wet? (2001, NCRV)
- Stop de tijd (2001, NCRV)
- De Mooiste Plek van Nederland (2001-2002, NCRV)
- Looking Good (2002-2006, RTL 4)
- De Ideale Man (2004, Yorin)
- Met Grenzeloze Ambitie (2006, RTL 7)
- Bedrijf in Beeld (2009-heden, RTL 7)
- Het Familieportret (2012-heden, RTL 4)
