= Dames in de Dop 2 =

- Country of origin: Netherlands
- No. of episodes: 6

Production
- Running time: 60 minutes

Original release
- Network: RTL 5
- Release: April 21 – May 26, 2008

Dames in de Dop 2 is the second season of Dames in de Dop, began on April 21, 2008. The winner, Michella Koxs, won €20,000 and a luxurious vacation.

== Contestants ==
- Daisy Ten Brink, 23, from Alkmaar, North Holland
- Susanne Kroon, 18, from Assen, Drenthe (quit)
- José Makkinga, 25, from Vroomshoop, Overijssel
- Astrid Kemperman, 20, from Dronten, Flevoland
- Sandy Schuring, 19, from Oostzaan, North Holland
- Cherish Walden, 23, from The Hague, South Holland
- Sharon Spronk, 20, from Utrecht, Utrecht
- Nancy Janssen, 23, from The Hague, South Holland (runner-up)
- Michella Koxs, 28, from Arnhem, Gelderland (winner)

== Summaries ==
=== Call-out order ===
| Order | Ep 1 | Ep 2 | Ep 3 | Ep 4 | Ep 5 | Ep 6 |
|---|---|---|---|---|---|---|
| 1 | Astrid | Nancy | Sharon | Sharon | Sharon | Michella |
| 2 | Michella | Michella | Sandy | Cherish | Nancy | Nancy |
| 3 | Nancy | Sandy | Nancy | Michella | Michella | Sharon |
| 4 | Sandy | Sharon | Michella | Nancy | Cherish | |
| 5 | Cherish | Cherish | Cherish | Sandy | | |
| 6 | Susanne | José | Astrid | | | |
| 7 | José | Astrid | José | | | |
| 8 | Sharon | Susanne | | | | |
| 9 | Daisy | | | | | |

The contestant won the reward challenge and quit the competition
The contestant was eliminated
The contestant won the competition

- In the first episode, Astrid, Michella, Nancy and Sandy were exempted for elimination, because they had to do a speech.
- In the second episode, Susanne quit the competition due to homesickness, therefore Astrid & José were saved for elimination.

=== Teachers ===
- Hendrik de Groot as protocol expert
- Coco de Meyere as image expert
- Anouk van Eekelen as etiquette expert
- Coen Winkelman as logopedic
