= Willhire 24 Hour =

Endurance race in Norfolk, England (1980-1994)

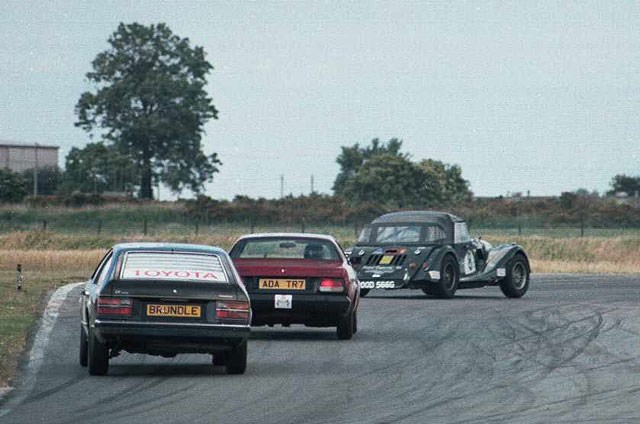
The inaugural Willhire 24 Hour, 1980

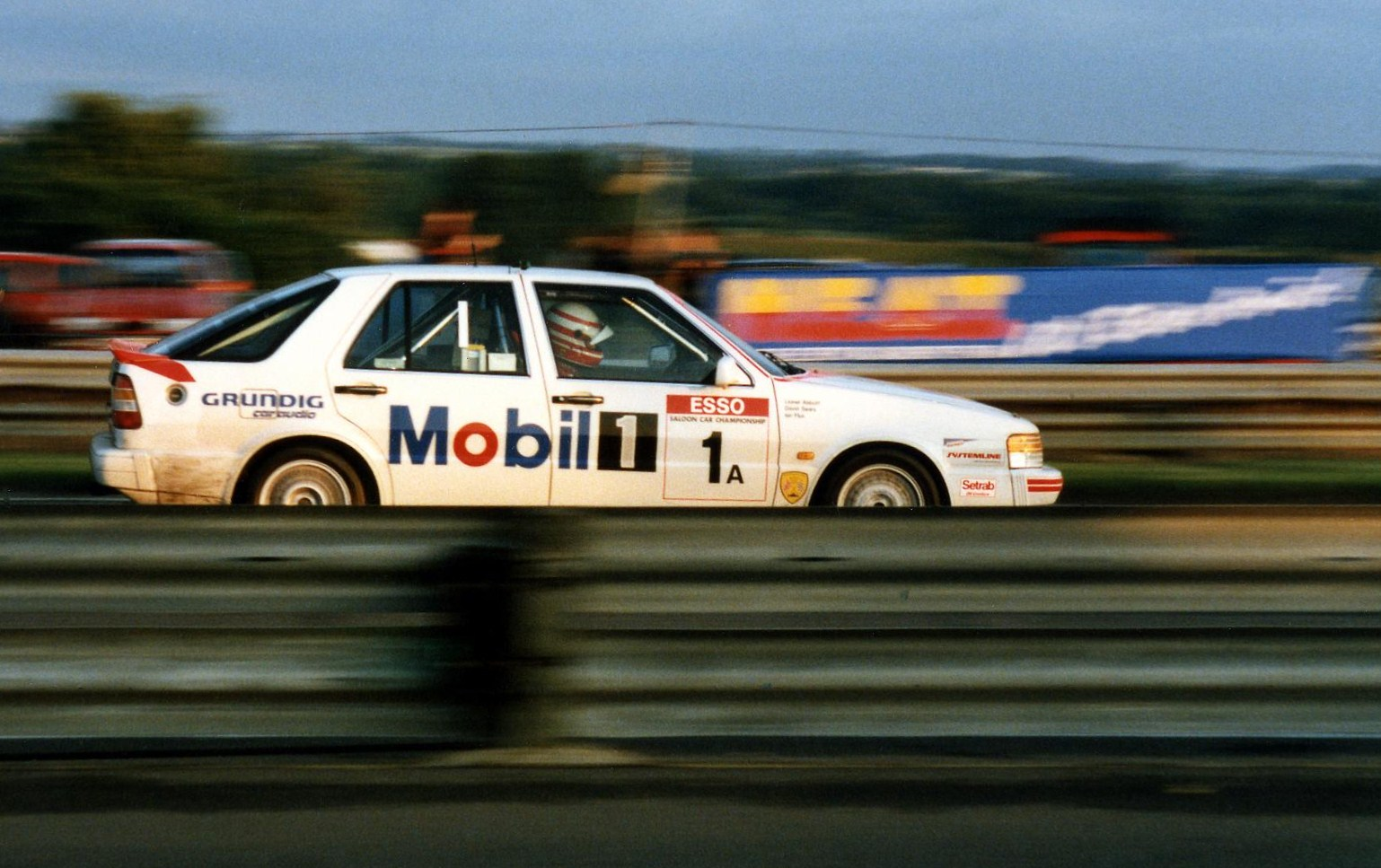
The Saab 9000 T16 of Lionel Abbott, Ian Flux and David Sears at the 1990 Willhire event

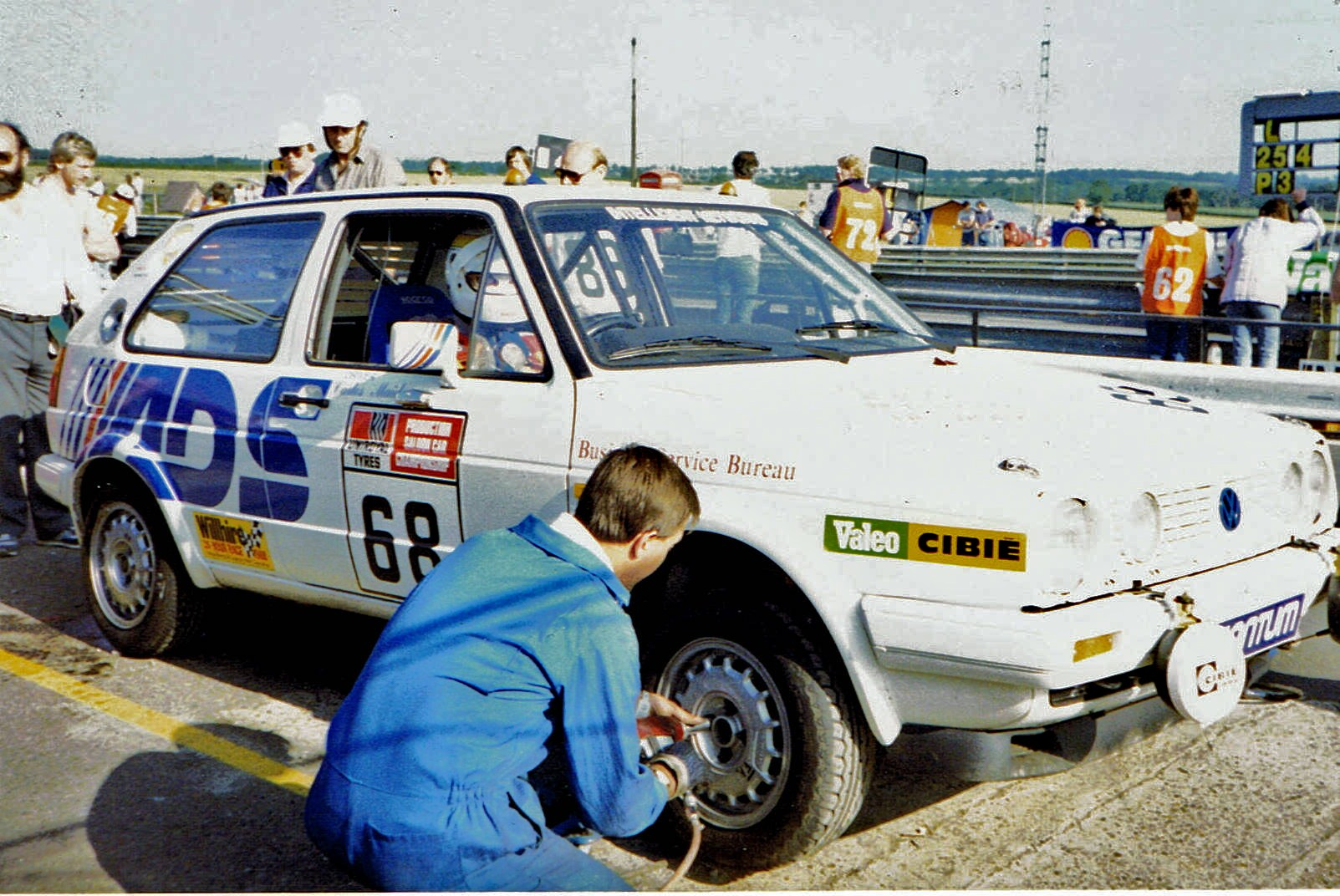
Carlos Maidana taking a pitstop in his Volkswagen Golf Mk2, 1988

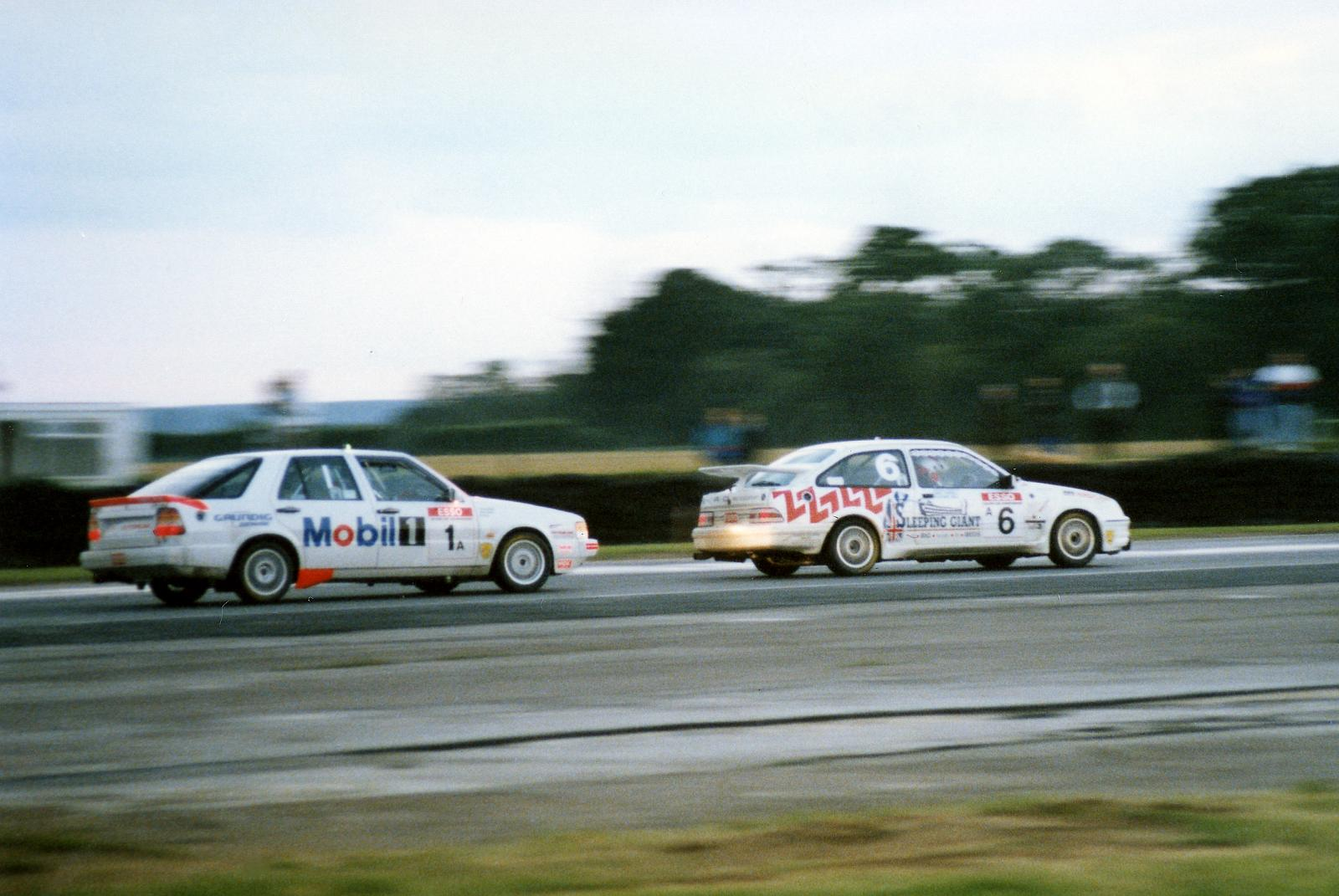
Two cars battling into Riches Corner, 1990

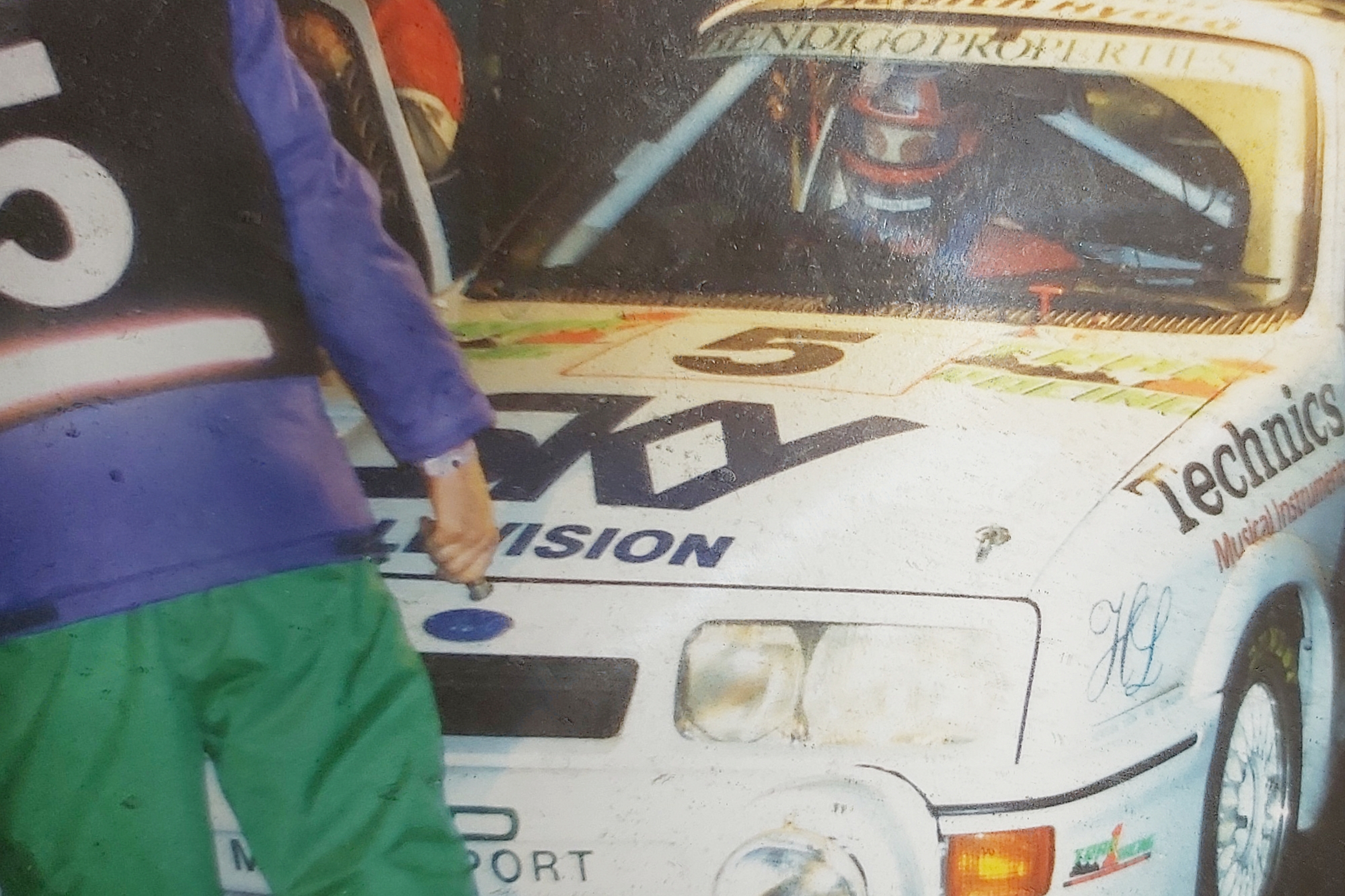
John Bartlett makes a pitstop - Sky Esso Willhire 24 Hour Race, Snetterton, 1991

The Willhire 24 Hour was an endurance race for production cars held at Snetterton Motor Racing Circuit in Norfolk, England between 1980 and 1994. Over the years, the race included both sports cars and saloon cars. Latterly, it was contested by competitors running in the FIA Group N specification National Saloon Car Cup. The race was run by the British Racing and Sports Car Club (BRSCC), which was also responsible for the aforementioned series.

== History ==
The race was sponsored by Willhire Vehicles Rentals (now Anglian Willhire, part of Northgate), a local car rental company, after its owner Roger Williams was approached to sponsor a motor racing event at the circuit. Williams talked about sponsoring a 6- or 24-hour event, initially as a joke, but the offer was accepted and the United Kingdom's first 24-hour race was founded. The race was first held in 1980. The 1989 event was 25 hours long to mark the 25th anniversary of the Willhire company. The final event was held in 1994.

== Participants and winners ==
The Willhire 24 Hour was won by a number of drivers who went on to have success in other forms of racing. In 1986, the winning car was co-driven by then BBC Radio 1 disc jockey Mike Smith and Lionel Abbott, who became the first two-driver team to win the race. The full list of winners is given below.

Other notable drivers who competed in the past other than those listed below include Martin Brundle, Steve Soper, John Cleland, Kieth O'dor, Tiff Needell, John Bartlett, James Thompson and Gerry Marshall. Stirling Moss was part of a class-winning team at the race in 1980, driving a Volkswagen Scirocco.

Olympic decathlete Daley Thompson was a notable entrant in a Peugeot 106 in 1993.

Commentator Ben Edwards was an entrant in a Ford Escort in 1994.

Year	Winning drivers	Car	Laps
1980 (multi-car team)	Pete Hall; Phil Dowsett; Martin Carroll; Syd Fox; Hamish Irvine; Andrew Jeffrey	Opel Commodore GS/E 2.8	955
1981 (multi-car team)	Martin Carroll; Pete Hall; Andy Rouse; Syd Fox; Phil Dowsett	Opel Commodore GS/E	990
1982	Robb Wells; Chris Alford; Malcolm Paul	Morgan Plus 8 3.5	970
1983	Tony Dron; Win Percy; Andy Rouse; Phil Dowsett	Porsche 928S 4.6	995
1984	Bill Taylor; Paul Edwards; Barry Robinson; John Lock	Porsche Carrera RS	952
1985	Roy Eaton; David Oates; John Clarke	Ford Capri 2.8i	970
1986	Mike Smith; Lionel Abbott	Ford Escort RS Turbo	965
1987	Robb Gravett; Graham Hathaway; Phil Bullman	Ford Sierra RS Cosworth	984
1988	Lionel Abbott; Graham Scarborough	Ford Sierra RS Cosworth	1,025
1989 (25 hours)	Mark Hales; Slim Borgudd	Ford Sierra Sapphire Cosworth	1,025
1990	Matt Neal; Dave Wallis; Stuart McCrudden	BMW M3	896
1991	Kurt Luby; Will Hoy; Ray Bellm	BMW M3	909
1992	Mike Jordan; Steve Griffin; Graham Coomes	BMW M3	928
1993	Mike Jordan; Mike Burtt; Charlie Cox; John Morrison	BMW M3	935
1994	Nickie Torregiani; Del Delaronde; Andrew Jeffrey; James Prochowski	Ford Escort RS Cosworth	939

== Legacy ==
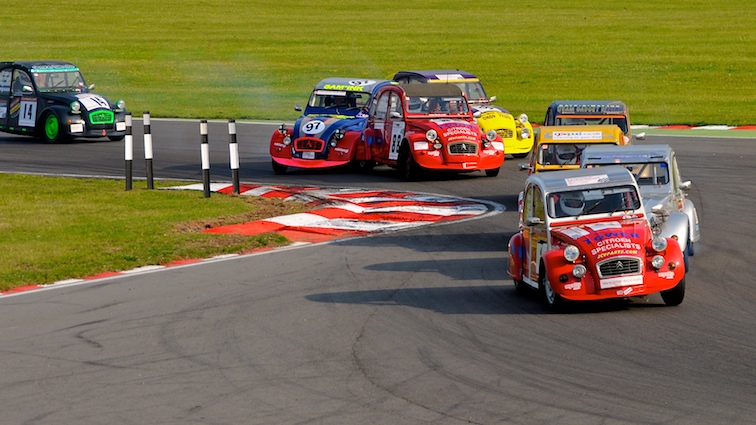
Endurance 2CV racing at Snetterton, 2009

Snetterton's experience in hosting a 24-hour race was proven to be beneficial when subsequently, the track became a host of some British Touring Car Championship night races from 1999, and Willhire-sponsored endurance races in 2002, 2003 and 2004, but full 24-hour racing did not return until 2003, when the 2CV 24 Hour Race moved to Snetterton. However, national 24 hour endurance racing would not return until the introduction of the Silverstone Britcar 24-Hour in 2005, taking place at Silverstone Circuit. The 2005 Britcar event is sometimes referred to as the Britcar Willhire 24 Hour Race.
