= Dames in de Dop 1 =

- Country of origin: Netherlands
- No. of episodes: 6

Production
- Running time: 60 minutes

Original release
- Network: RTL 5
- Release: May 28 – July 2, 2007

Dames in de Dop 1 is the first season of Dames in de Dop, began on May 28, 2007. The winner, won €20,000 and a luxurious vacation.

== Contestants ==
=== In order of elimination ===
- Jasmin Velders, 21, from Hook of Holland, South Holland
- Kirby Wonnink, 20, from Deventer, Overijssel
- Tamara Brun, 25, from Rotterdam, South Holland
- Roxanne Brouwers, 18, from 's-Hertogenbosch, North Brabant
- Demet Sari, 26, from Amsterdam, North Holland
- Daisy Smid, 18, from Sneek, Friesland
- Elli Palimeris, 21, from IJmuiden, North Holland
- Lara Massen, 19, from Geleen, Limburg (runner-up)
- Anna Jonckers, 21, from Amsterdam, North Holland (winner)

== Summaries ==
=== Call-out order ===
Order	Ep 1	Ep 2	Ep 3	Ep 4	Ep 5	Ep 6
1	Anna	Lara	Roxanne	Elli	Lara	Anna
2	Roxanne	Elli	Daisy	Anna	Anna	Lara
3	Demet	Demet	Lara	Lara	Elli	Elli
4	Elli	Roxanne	Demet	Demet	Daisy	
5	Daisy	Tamara	Anna	Daisy	Demet	
6	Lara	Anna	Elli	Roxanne		
7	Kirby	Daisy	Tamara			
8	Tamara	Kirby				
9	Jasmin					

The contestant won the reward challenge
The contestant won the additional prize of the reward challenge
The contestant was eliminated
The contestant won the competition

- In the fifth episode, Daisy & Demet were both eliminated.

=== Teachers ===
- Robert Wennekes as butler
- Coco de Meyere as image expert
- Anouk van Eekelen as etiquette expert
- Jacob Jan Boerma as chef
- Coen Winkelman as logopedic
