= List of De Club van Sinterklaas episodes =

This article contains a list of episodes of the Dutch TV series De Club van Sinterklaas. Episodes were first aired by Fox Kids (1999, 2001-2004), Jetix (2005-2008) and RTL 4 (2009). The series has also spun a theatrical series.

== Season 1: De Club van Sinterklaas (1999) ==
No.	Title	Directed by	Written by	Original release date
1	"Episode 1"	Armando de Boer	Daphny Muriloff	November 1, 1999
We meet Wegwijspiet and Chefpiet who just started their own Paella restaurant, Pedro's Paella Palacio. We also meet Rosita, Wegwijs' girlfriend, who helps out from time to time at Pedro's. We start following the daily misadventures of the club of Sinterklaas.
2	"Episode 2"	Armando de Boer	Daphny Muriloff	November 2, 1999
Wegwijspiet takes off to a meeting with Hoofdpiet and the rest of the Club, but gets lost on the way...
3	"Episode 3"	Armando de Boer	Daphny Muriloff	November 3, 1999
4	"Episode 4"	Armando de Boer	Daphny Muriloff	November 4, 1999
5	"Episode 5"	Armando de Boer	Daphny Muriloff	November 5, 1999
6	"Episode 6"	Armando de Boer	Daphny Muriloff	November 8, 1999
7	"Episode 7"	Armando de Boer	Daphny Muriloff	November 9, 1999
8	"Episode 8"	Armando de Boer	Daphny Muriloff	November 10, 1999
9	"Episode 9"	Armando de Boer	Daphny Muriloff	November 11, 1999
10	"Episode 10"	Armando de Boer	Daphny Muriloff	November 12, 1999
11	"Episode 11"	Armando de Boer	Daphny Muriloff	November 15, 1999
12	"Episode 12"	Armando de Boer	Daphny Muriloff	November 16, 1999
13	"Episode 13"	Armando de Boer	Daphny Muriloff	November 17, 1999
14	"Episode 14"	Armando de Boer	Daphny Muriloff	November 18, 1999
15	"Episode 15"	Armando de Boer	Daphny Muriloff	November 19, 1999
16	"Episode 16"	Armando de Boer	Daphny Muriloff	November 22, 1999
17	"Episode 17"	Armando de Boer	Daphny Muriloff	November 23, 1999
18	"Episode 18"	Armando de Boer	Daphny Muriloff	November 24, 1999
19	"Episode 19"	Armando de Boer	Daphny Muriloff	November 25, 1999
20	"Episode 20"	Armando de Boer	Daphny Muriloff	November 26, 1999
The maps are returned to the castle in time and the birthday of St. Nicholas is saved.

== Season 2: De Nieuwe Club van Sinterklaas (2001) ==
No.	Title	Directed by	Written by	Original release date
1	"Episode 1"	Liesbeth Roelofs; Armando de Boer	Gerda van de Brug; Maria Westerbos	2001
New Pieten join the Club. But two of them, Weerpiet and Hoge Hoogte Piet, arrive late and miss the boat. And thus, without cash and transportation, they will have to find a different way to get the Netherlands. Will they be able to reach the Netherlands in time before the fifth of December...?

== Season 3: De Club van Sinterklaas & de Verdwijning van Wagen 27 (2002) ==
No.	Title	Directed by	Written by	Original release date
1	"Episode 1"	Liesbeth Roelofs; Armando de Boer	Gerda van de Brug; Maria Westerbos	2002
Preparations for going to the Netherlands are in full progress. The vans and boats are being filled with the gifts. Testpiet is running behind on schedule and is trying to talk Hoofdpiet into letting her go with Surpisepiet on van 27, to test the final toys on their way to the Netherlands and finish everything in time.

d

== Season 4: De Club van Sinterklaas & het Blafpoeder (2003) ==
No.	Title	Directed by	Written by	Original release date
1	"Episode 1"	Liesbeth Roelofs; Armando de Boer	Gerda van de Brug	2003
A new year is in sight. Things are going as usual: Preparations for the yearly trip to the Netherlands are in progress, vans and boats are being prepared, Muziekpiet is where else than in the kitchen with his nose in the chocolate pans... Meanwhile, outside of the castle, Hoge Hoogte Piet and the brand new Surprise Piet Jr meet a strange guy named Jacob. Another new Piet, Profpiet, is secured by Sinterklaas with the important job of taking care of the big book.
20	"Episode 20"	Liesbeth Roelofs; Armando de Boer	Gerda van de Brug	2003
Everything seems to have come together. The Pieten have captured Jacob and Meneer de Directeur is still behind bars. But, Jacob, as manipulative as he is, tries everything he can to distract the Pieten to make his escape...

== Season 7: De Club van Sinterklaas & Paniek in de Confettifabriek (2006) ==
No.	Title	Directed by	Written by	Original release date
1	"Episode 1"	Liesbeth Roelofs; Armando de Boer	Gerda van de Brug	October 30, 2006
Sinterklaas asks Kleurpiet, a Piet apparently under the service of Sint a few years ago, to return for an important favor. He sends Testpiet to pick him up from the bus station.
2	"Episode 2"	Liesbeth Roelofs; Armando de Boer	Gerda van de Brug	October 31, 2006
Because Kleurpiet didn't show up, Testpiet decides to go look for him. Meanwhile, Hulppiet, Coole Piet and Hoge Hoogte Piet try to decide where Kleur has to sleep once he arrives.
3	"Episode 3"	Liesbeth Roelofs; Armando de Boer	Gerda van de Brug	November 1, 2006
Hoge Hoogte and Coole Piet start to worry about Testpiet, who hasn't returned yet. Meanwhile, Testpiet, on the search for Kleurpiet after her bus broke down, is being stalked by a weird looking guy...
4	"Episode 4"	Liesbeth Roelofs; Armando de Boer	Gerda van de Brug	November 2, 2006
Testpiet manages to trick her stalker and demands an explanation. He turns out to be 'a big fan'...
5	"Episode 5"	Liesbeth Roelofs; Armando de Boer	Gerda van de Brug	November 3, 2006
With Testpiet and Kleurpiet arrested, everything keeps getting worse. Meanwhile, a TV crew reaches the castle to meet Kleurpiet for some reason, and Sinterklaas seems a little too upset over Kleurpiet not being there in time...
