= De Augurkenkoning =

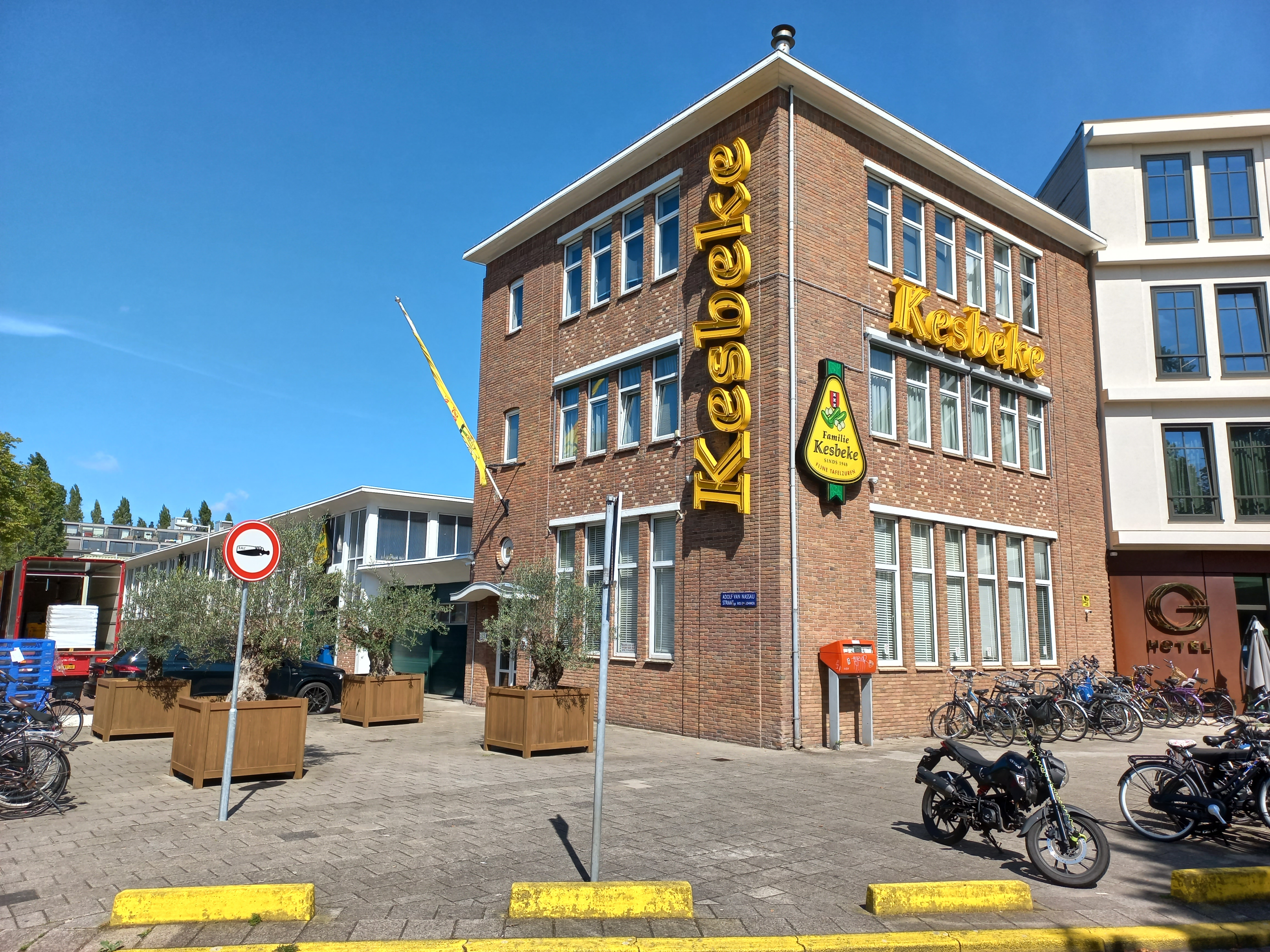
- The show's main filming location at the Kesbeke Factory
- Genre: Reality
- Starring: Oos Kesbeke; Camiel Kesbeke; Silvian Kesbeke; Daan Ponne; Frans Slagt
- Narrated by: Kees Prins
- Country of origin: Netherlands
- Original language: Dutch
- No. of seasons: 4
- No. of episodes: 27 & 1 special

Production
- Production location: Amsterdam
- Running time: 45 minutes (Season 1); 65 minutes (Season 2 onward)
- Production company: Concept Street

Original release
- Network: RTL 5
- Release: October 12, 2023 – December 23, 2024

De Augurkenkoning (English: The Pickle King) is a Dutch television series about the family business Kesbeke based in Amsterdam which specializes in the production of pickled vegetables. The series follows CEO Oos Kesbeke as he trains his sons Camiel and Silvian to inherit the family business. The show highlights the daily occurrences and humorous moments which occur in the factory, as well as showing the real challenges of employees such as Daan and Frans.

The series is aired on RTL 5 before being made available on the streaming service Videoland. The first season started airing in oktober of 2023 and received an average viewership of 700,000 per episode. In 2024 two more seasons were aired. On 23 december 2024 a special christmas episode aired called Kerst met de Augurkenkoning. On 17 september 2025 airing of the fourth season started, this time on RTL 4.

== Spin-offs ==
On 27 december 2025, De Augurkenkoning in India aired its first episode on RTL 4. This is a two episode spin-off of the original series following Oos Kesbeke as he makes his dream journey to India. India is significant to the Kesbeke brand as many of its pickles originate from that country.
