= Project Catwalk (Dutch TV series) =

- Logo
- Created by: Eli Holzman
- Starring: Renate Verbaan; Daryl van Wouw; Cécile Narinx
- Country of origin: Netherlands
- Original language: Dutch

Production
- Running time: 60 minutes (including commercials)

Original release
- Network: RTL 5
- Release: October 8, 2007

Project Catwalk is the Netherlands version of the reality show Project Runway. Season 1 shown in 2007 and was won by Django Steenbakker. The show lasted 2 more seasons, for a total of 3 seasons, before being canceled.
