= Kees Prins =

Dutch director, actor and voice actor (born 1956)

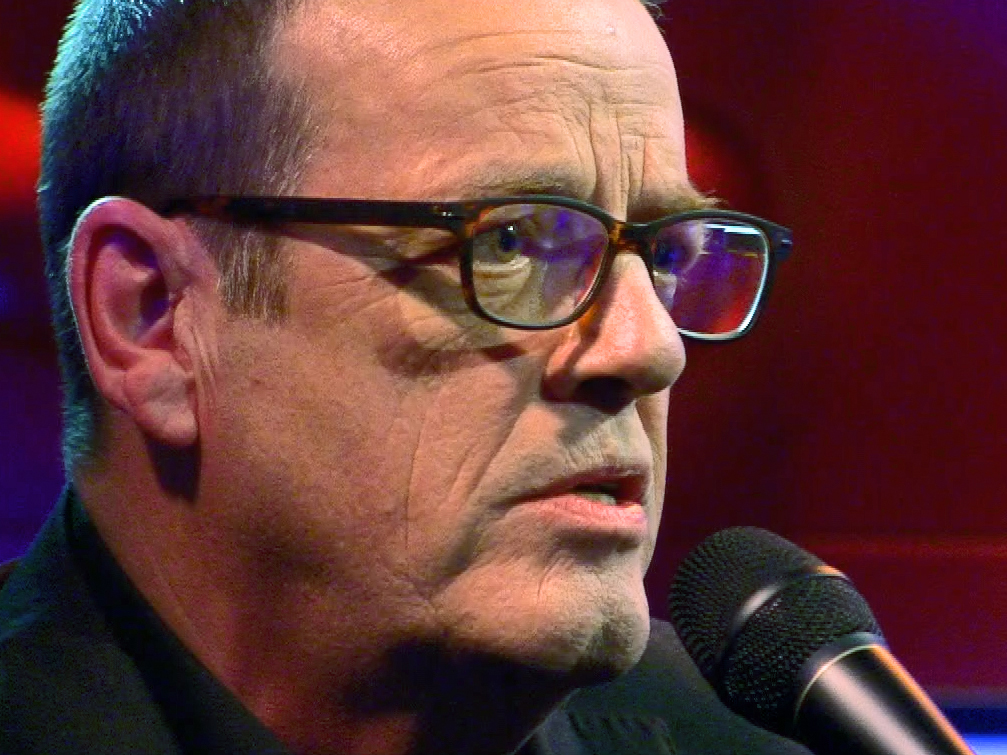
- Kees Prins in 2018.
- Born: Cornelis Willibrordus Maria Prins; 7 April 1956 (age 70); Heemstede, Netherlands
- Other name: Melvin
- Occupations: Actor; director; voice actor
- Years active: 1981–present
- Known for: Jiskefet, Buurman en Buurman (Pat & Mat), Villa Achterwerk
- Relatives: Huub Prins (twin brother)

Cornelis Willibrordus Maria "Kees" Prins (born 7 April 1956, in Heemstede, Netherlands) is a Dutch director, actor and voice actor. He is most known for his work in the absurdist-satirical television series Jiskefet and for his role as Pat in Buurman en Buurman (The dutch dubbed version of Pat & Mat). He also provided narration for popular reality show De Augurkenkoning.

== Personal life ==
Prins is the son of a police officer. Prins was born a few minutes before midnight on 7 April, with his twin brother Huub being born a few minutes later on 8 April. The two twin brothers were the youngest of a Catholic family.
