= RTL Nederland =

Dutch media network, subsidiary of the DPG Media

RTL Nederland Holding B.V.
- Formerly: Holland Media Group (1996-2004)
- Type: Subsidiary
- Industry: Media
- Predecessor: RTL 4 SA (1990-1996); RTL Veronique SA (1989-1990)
- Founded: 1 September 1996; 30 years ago
- Headquarters: Hilversum, Netherlands
- Areas served: Netherlands; Luxembourg
- Key people: Sven Sauvé (CEO)
- Brands: RTL 4; RTL 5; RTL 7; RTL 8; RTL Z; RTL Lounge; RTL Crime; RTL Telekids; Videoland; Buienradar; Editie NL
- Parent: CLT (Luxembourgeoise de Télédiffusion) / Audiofina (1989–1997) CLT-UFA (1997–2000); RTL Group(2000-2025) DPG Media (2025-present)
- Divisions: Ad Alliance
- Website: Official website

RTL Nederland is a Dutch media network, a subsidiary of DPG Media. The media company is located in Hilversum, although the licences of its TV stations are issued in Luxembourg.

== History ==
=== Early years ===
The history of the network dates back to 1989 when Dutch-minded RTL-Véronique started airing from Luxembourg. At the time commercial television was prohibited in The Netherlands, but by airing from Luxembourg the law could be bypassed. In the beginning, the channel only focused on youth, this changed in 1990 when an agreement was made with Joop van den Ende – whose own commercial channel TV10 failed due to the same law – and the name of the channel was changed into RTL 4. In 1993 a second channel was created named RTL 5.

=== Creation of HMG and regulatory problems ===
In 1995, the two channels were merged in a new joint venture with Veronica Association, until then part of the Dutch public broadcasting system. The new joint venture was named Holland Media Group (HMG) and consisted of RTL 4, RTL 5, Veronica, and the radio station HitRadio Veronica. A supply contract with Endemol was also signed, which enabled the continuation of its production to other channels, including TROS slots on the public channels. The three channels took on a more "complementary" approach.

The merger caused HMG to control three television channels, but Veronica's entry led to the auctioning of RTL 5 by the European Commission, in order to curb on its dominance of the Dutch commercial television landscape, violating EU competition regulations. Moreover, the creation of HMG could not be ratified unless RTL 5 could be sold and Endemol's share could be reduced to a "symbolic" level.

In 1997, HMG had an ambitious plan to enter the Surinamese market. The goal was to launch a pay channel in Suriname featuring content from RTL 4 and Veronica and that would be available as a subscription satellite service. At the time, the only pay-TV company in Suriname was a small 16-channel service broadcasting mainly US-made films and shows.

From 1997 till 1998 HMG participated in TV10, together with Saban, but sold its share to Fox. The joint-venture existed until 2001 when the Veronica Association left, leaving their channel and radio station behind, but because they took the trademark the channel and radio station were renamed Yorin. On 6 August 2003, the Dutch Supreme Court ruled out that RTL 4 and RTL 5 would continue under Luxembourgish regulations. If the two channels were brought under Dutch law, the group would, according to the Media Authority, earn more money, but would be subject to strict Dutch advertising laws regarding product placement and commercial breaks, similar to the laws used by the public system.

=== Becoming RTL Nederland ===
The company changed its name from Holland Media Group to RTL Nederland in 2004. In 2005, Yorin was renamed again this time to RTL 7. However, the intended plan to strip Yorin of its Dutch license, bringing Yorin under Luxembourgish laws, put RTL Nederland in hot water again. Although the channels still had a more "liberal" Luxembourgish license, the channels have always abided to Dutch advertising rules.

That same year, it announced its plan to produce Dutch feature films for theatrical circuits. In 2006 the Yorin radio station was sold to SBS Broadcasting.

In 2006, with the growth of widescreen television set ownership in the Netherlands, RTL announced that its three channels would start broadcasting in widescreen from 1 January 2007. This was later delayed to 1 June 2007.

=== Entrance of John de Mol ===
As of August 2007, the group entered into a new joint venture with John de Mol, whose own commercial channel was failing at the time. RTL Nederland acquired the channel and Radio 538, John de Mol's Talpa Media Holding would acquire 26,3% of the shares in RTL Nederland. The acquired channel was renamed RTL 8 that same month. In 2011 John de Mol was forced by the Netherlands Authority for Consumers and Markets to sell his share in RTL Nederland when he and Sanoma acquired competitor SBS Broadcasting, taking with him the radio stations Radio 538, Radio 10 Gold and SLAM!FM.

=== Sale to DPG Media ===
In December 2022, it was announced that the RTL Group was considering selling its Dutch TV station RTL Nederland. After merger plans failed in 2023, it was officially announced in December that RTL Group was selling RTL Nederland for 1.1 billion euros to DPG Media. The sale is currently awaiting approval from Dutch authorities and is scheduled to be closed by mid-2024.

On June 27, it was announced by the Dutch Competition Authority, ACM that the sale of RTL Nederland had been given the green light to DPG Media, thus retaining the "RTL" brand as part of a separate trademark agreement until December 2034. The acquisition was completed July 1, 2025.

=== Acquisitions ===
Over the years the group acquired several other companies, including Wentik Events (2010, renamed to RTL Live Entertainment), Bright (2015), Buienradar (2011), Videoland (2013), Adfactor (2017), BrandDeli (2018), Triade Media (2015).

=== Failed merger with Talpa ===
After John de Mol raised his stake in SBS Broadcasting in 2017 to full ownership he sought a partnership with RTL Nederland. In his opinion there wasn't enough space for two major Dutch commercial television networks in the changed media landscape, RTL shut down his offer. However in June 2021 RTL Nederland and Talpa Network announced plans for a merger, pending approval by the European Commission and the Netherlands Authority for Consumers and Markets. In the new conglomerate, RTL Nederland is to hold 70% of the shares and Talpa 30%. Talpa Entertainment Productions and Talpa Concepts won't be a part of the merger. Both parties reasoned that a merger was the only solution to an ever-growing presence of foreign media parties, giving space to a single commercial Dutch media company that's capable of producing specifically for the Dutch market. Critics however claimed that the failure of Talpa Network is the reason behind the merger. In January 2022 the Netherlands Authority for Consumers and Markets stated that it could not approve the merger as of yet and that further investigation to the consequences of price, quality, and innovation is necessary. On 30 January 2023 the Authority announced that it would not approve the merger, citing that the merged company would become too powerful.

== Assets ==
RTL 4 logo

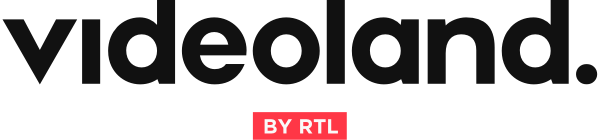
Videoland by RTL logo

=== Television ===
- RTL 4, oldest channel of the group and their flagship
- RTL 5, focused on reality and youth
- RTL 7, focused on sports and the male demographic
- RTL 8, focused on movies and the female demographic
- RTL Z, focused on news, finance, and documentaries
- RTL Crime, digital pay channel focused on crime series and reality
- RTL Lounge, digital pay channel focused on drama
- RTL Telekids, digital pay channel focused on children

=== Streaming catchup and Video on Demand services ===
- RTL.nl (previously RTL XL) - News and Entertainment
- Videoland by RTL, an OTT streaming service

=== Other ===
- RTL Live Entertainment
- Ad Alliance, advertisement agency
- RTL Nieuws B.V. news organisation including Buienradar and Bright
- Bright is a Dutch media brand, focussed on technology, design and style.
