= Dames in de Dop =

Dutch reality TV show

- Starring: Hendrik de Groot; Coco de Meyere (deceased, 11/24/2011); Anouk van Eekelen
- Country of origin: Netherlands
- No. of episodes: 62

Production
- Running time: Season 1: 46 minutes (60 with commercials); Season 2: 43 minutes (60 with commercials); Season 3: 23 minutes (30 with commercials)

Original release
- Network: RTL 5
- Release: May 28, 2007 – 2011

Dames in de Dop (free translation Ladies in the making) is the Dutch version of UK reality show Ladette to Lady. Two seasons have been made since 2007 for broadcast on RTL.

== Show format ==
The series follows nine ladettes (i.e. loud, foul-mouthed, uncultured and unpleasant women, who resort to drinking, smoking and often sexually promiscuous behaviour), who are given an old-fashioned six-week course in learning how to behave like a real lady. In the first season, they were sent to Huis 't Velde, an International Butler Academy in Warnsveld, Gelderland. In the second season they were sent to Nieuw Rande, in Diepenveen, Overijssel. Nieuw Rande was specially reopened to try to change the ladettes' habits.

Whilst in Nieuw Rande they are required to wear the special uniform: a tweed suit including a turquoise jacket, white blouse, and turquoise skirt, high-heeled shoes and a pearl necklace. They are taught under the supervision and guidance of five instructors and are given various tasks in deportment, elocution, etiquette and cookery. However, if they can't live up to the standards of acting ladylike, they are expelled. Each episode sees one ladette (sometimes two) expelled till only three are left at the end of the season. Then the teachers must decide upon one winner, depending on who they think has improved the most and how the ladettes performed in the final challenge.

== Season summary ==
Season	Began airing	Winner	Runner-up	Other contestants (in order of elimination)	International destination(s)
Season 1	May 28, 2007	Anna Jonckers	Lara Massen	Jasmin Velders, Kirby Wonnink, Tamara Brun, Roxanne Brouwers, Demet Sari, Daisy Smid, Elli Palimeris	Dubai, United Arab Emirates
Season 2	April 21, 2008	Michella Koxs	Nancy Janssen	Daisy Ten Brink, Susanne Kroon (quit), José Makkinga, Astrid Kemperman, Sandy Schuring, Cherish Walden, Sharon Spronk	Zürich, Switzerland
Season 3	March 7, 2011	Meron van der Schaar	Jenna Dame	Lois, Zira Berg, Marcin Sarna, Jennifer (expelled), Linsey Wareman, Gary Curiel, Dilara Sinan, Dominique Kudret, Dave Lamens, Yosie Wittebol	No international destination
