= RTL Telekids =

- Country: Netherlands
- Broadcast area: Netherlands
- Headquarters: Hilversum, Netherlands

Programming
- Picture format: 1080i HDTV (downscaled to 16:9 576i for the SDTV feed)

Ownership
- Owner: RTL Group (2010–2025); DPG Media (2025–present)
- Parent: RTL Nederland
- Sister channels: RTL 4 RTL 5 RTL 7 RTL 8 RTL Z RTL Lounge; RTL Crime

History
- Launched: 18 October 2010; 15 years ago (as a block on RTL 8) 3 September 2012; 13 years ago (as a channel)
- Closed: 31 December 2020 (as a block on RTL 8)

Availability

Streaming media
- Ziggo GO: ZiggoGO.tv (Europe only)

RTL Telekids is a Dutch pay television kids channel owned by RTL Nederland. In addition, RTL Telekids was broadcast as a youth-oriented block on RTL 8 in the daytime until 31 December 2020. Like the rest of the Dutch RTL network, RTL Telekids was until 30 June 2026 officially a Luxembourgish channel that does not have to adhere to Dutch broadcasting laws. Since July 1, 2026, the TV station obtained a Netherlands TV licence.

== History ==
=== Youth block ===
On 19 August 2010 RTL announced that the name RTL Telekids would be used for a new youth block on RTL 8. A big difference with the former programme Telekids is that the broadcast is no longer done by a presenter from the studio.

Originally RTL Telekids would start on 4 October 2010. However, on 1 October 2010, there was a car collision on the motorway A59 where a woman and three children were killed in a car accident on their way to the Efteling, where the filming would take place for the program, De Schatkamer, which is part of RTL Telekids. Out of respect for the victims' families the launch of RTL Telekids had been postponed for two weeks until 18 October 2010.

On December 31, 2020, RTL Telekids was closed as a block.

== Previous logos ==
2010-2016

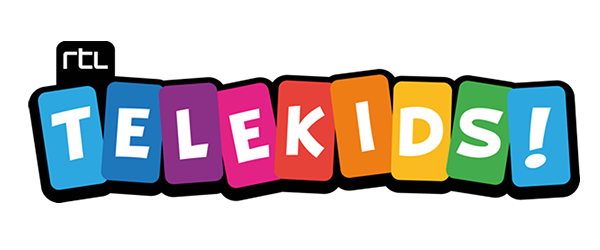
2016-2023
