= RTL 7 =

Dutch television channel

- Country: Netherlands
- Headquarters: Hilversum, Netherlands

Programming
- Picture format: 1080i HDTV; (downscaled to 16:9 576i for the SDTV feed)

Ownership
- Owner: DPG Media
- Parent: RTL Nederland
- Sister channels: RTL 4; RTL 5; RTL 8; RTL Z; RTL Lounge; RTL Crime; RTL Telekids

History
- Launched: 1 September 1995; 31 years ago
- Former names: Veronica (1995-2001); Yorin (2001-2005)

Links
- Website: rtl7.nl

Availability

Terrestrial
- Digitenne: Channel 7 (HD)
- DTT (Luxembourg): 498 MHz (SD)

Streaming media
- Ziggo GO: ZiggoGO.tv (Europe only)
- KPN iTV Online: Watch live (Europe only)

RTL 7 is a Dutch free-to-cable television channel that was originally launched as Veronica on 1 September 1995, then was latter rebranded as Yorin on 2 April 2001. RTL 7 is RTL Nederland's "men's channel" with action films, reality television about crime and professions, football, motorsport and talk shows about sports. During daytime business and financial news channel RTL Z was broadcasting on RTL 7 until RTL Nederland revamped RTL Z into a 24-hours channel on 7 September 2015.

Officially RTL 7 along with RTL 4, RTL 5 and RTL 8 is headquartered in Hilversum, broadcasting under a Netherlands TV licence since 1 July 2026. Until 30 June 2026, the channel was broadcasting under a Luxembourgish TV license. This allows them to avoid more severe control by the Dutch media authorities as Luxembourg's television watchdog is less strict. Yorin used to be licensed in the Netherlands before, but moved to Luxembourg after the RTL 7 rebrand. There is a 40 kW DVB-T transmitter on the Dudelange Radio Tower in Luxembourg that broadcasts the channel free-to-air, but the main audience in the Netherlands needs a subscription to a cable, satellite, IPTV, or DVB-T provider to get access. All providers include the channel in their base package.

== History ==
=== Veronica (1995–2001) ===
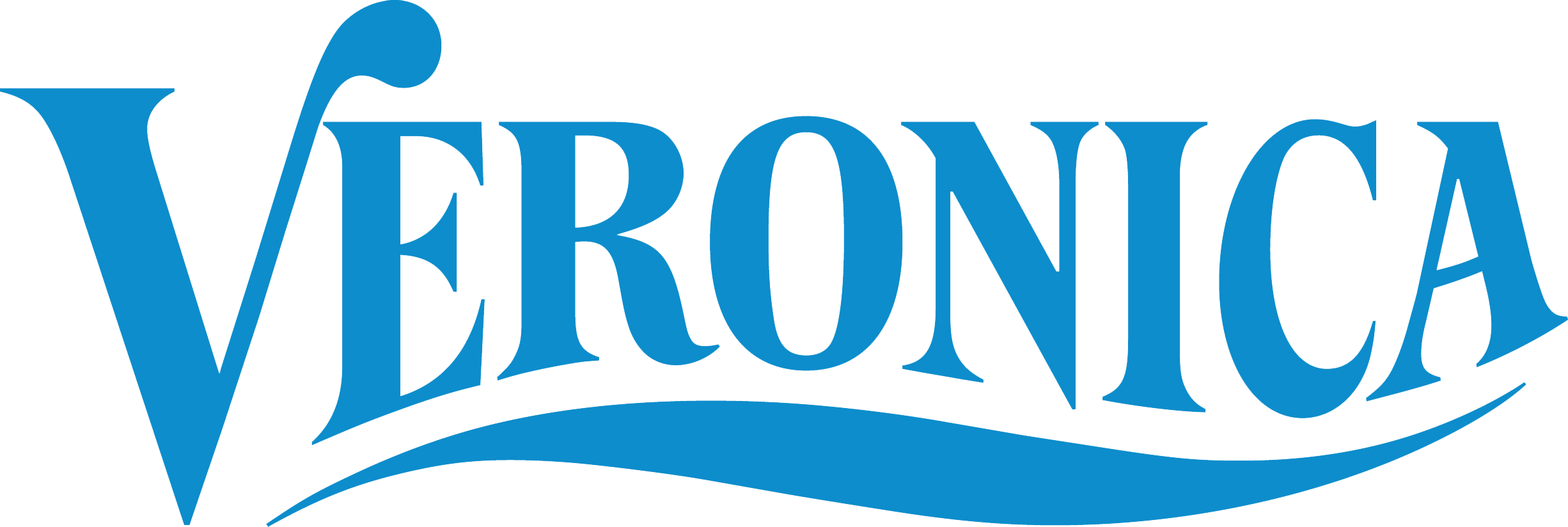
RTL 7's logo as Veronica

The channel began as Veronica on 1 September 1995, and was a joint venture between RTL 4, RTL 5 and Veronica Association (in Dutch: Vereniging Veronica), and with the radio station HitRadio Veronica in the Holland Media Groep.

The Veronica Organisation had been a public broadcasting association since 1 January 1976 but left the Dutch public broadcasting system in 1995 and started a commercial channel.

In the first year, it broadcasts a lot of American TV series, such as Beverly Hills, 90210, Melrose Place and Baywatch, films, Dutch programmes ranging from game shows to talk shows and Dutch TV series, such as Flodder and Onderweg naar Morgen. By the end of its first year, Veronica dropped the news-related programmes and established its place in the Dutch television market as a young adult channel with programmes of a provocative nature. In the next years, Veronica proved to be a pioneer in television making by introducing a wide range of reality shows with a real breakthrough when it launched the reality game show Big Brother in 1999.

In 2000 Veronica announced it would leave the joint venture and wanted to start a channel of its own. Eventually, Veronica Association closed a deal with SBS in 2003. RTL had to withdraw the Veronica name from the channel by 1 September 2001.

=== Yorin (2001–2005) ===
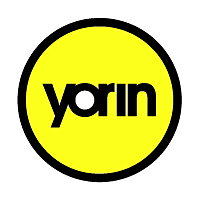
RTL 7's old logo as Yorin

RTL had to change the name of the station. At first, RTL came up with ME for both radio and television, with a campaign saying ME komt er aan (ME is coming), but a fashion label in the Netherlands (WE) complained about the similarity with its name. Moreover, the retailer had also claimed the usage of the names ME, SHE, HE and YOU for WE's sub-brands in the Benelux region. Had RTL not abandoned the ME brand, the media company would be sent to court. Finally, after forbidding the usage of the name ME in March 2001, RTL rebranded Veronica to Yorin on 2 April 2001, announced to the public on 29 March. Yorin referred to the English phrase "You're in". The Dutch version of The Price Is Right, Cash en Carlo, referenced this fact when announcer Eddy Keur told contestants "Yorin the game!" when they came on down to Contestant's Row. All programmes previously on Veronica and also the television presenters moved to Yorin. RTL didn't want to add RTL into the name (instead of calling it RTL 6 or RTL 1) so the channel would keep its own identity. Some of the programmes that were popular on Veronica continued on Yorin, even though these were initially planned to air on ME.

The new name, Yorin, also had negative connotation due to being a close paronym of "urine". An NRC journalist said that the effect was the opposite of the intended "Yorin (You're in) the movement" tagline. Some staff abroad were even mocked for the similarities, as well as a case where British journalists laughed at the name in Cannes, as reported by De Volkskrant.

In the auctioning off of FM radio frequencies called ZeroBase, Holland Media Group acquired a lot allowing them to broadcast a popular music station virtually nationwide; this station was called Yorin FM with its most notable DJs being Rob Stenders, Robert Jensen and Henk Westbroek. In 2006, due to disappointing results, Holland Media Group sold the station to SBS Broadcasting, who rebranded it Caz! and changed the programming to a fully middle-of-the-road all-music formula.

=== RTL 7 (since 2005) ===
Logo from 2005 to 2010

Logo from 2010 to 2017

Logo from 2017 to 2023

When Dutch media tycoon and Big Brother-inventor John de Mol announced the launch of a TV channel named Talpa, and contracted many popular Dutch TV hosts, the RTL Group felt the need to reorganize its channels. Apart from a physical renewal, the setup of its channels RTL 4, RTL 5 and Yorin were changed.

The group announced the rename of Yorin in May 2005 but had to depend on market strategies. Initially the names RTL 6 and RTL+ were suggested, in order to create a family of channels. To emphasize the three channels' connection, the name Yorin was replaced by RTL 7 on 12 August 2005. The name was selected in late June as part of the results of a survey that suggested that most viewers had Yorin on channel 7 and that the average Dutch viewer who started on channel 1 (Nederland 1) stopped on one of RTL's secondary channels (5 or 7). Practically all former Yorin shows were moved to RTL 5, whereas that RTL 5's programmes continued on RTL 7. RTL Z also moved from RTL 5 to RTL 7.

The origin of the number 7, instead of a more logical 6, goes back to 1995 when the original channel Veronica was founded. Around the same time, the commercial channels SBS6 and TMF appeared and also claimed channel 6 on the remote control. Veronica and TMF lost the battle for remote control button 6. Also, SBS6 was originally managed by Fons van Westerloo, who later became head of RTL Nederland before the rebranding operation.

During the 2007-2008 Eredivisie season, it shared the FTA rights with RTL 4.

On 15 October 2009, RTL Nederland started simulcasting their RTL 7 and RTL 8 channels in 1080i high-definition.

With the conversion of RTL Z into a channel in its own right on 7 September 2015, RTL 7 started clearing the daytime schedule with repeats of programmes previously seen on the RTL channels.

== Programming ==
RTL 7 broadcasts a large number of sports programmes such as football, darts and motorsports, but in which motorsports is their main broadcast item. This include live coverage of Formula One and the MotoGP as the most notable. But also the A1 Grand Prix, Dakar Rally and the Indianapolis 500 are broadcast live on RTL 7. Movies, series and entertainment programmings also broadcast on this channel.

=== Imported ===
- 'Allo 'Allo!
- 24
- The A-Team
- Arrested Development
- The Beast
- The Black Donnellys
- The Blacklist
- Bakugan: Battle Planet
- Baywatch
- Beyblade Burst
- Billy the Exterminator
- Blazing Team: Masters of Yo Kwon Do
- Born to Kill?
- Cobra 11
- The Good Guys
- Hardcore Pawn
- Ice Road Truckers
- Inazuma Eleven
- Journeyman
- K-Ville
- Killer Instinct
- Knight Rider
- Law & Order
- Les Dalton
- Life on Mars
- Married... with Children
- Medicopter 117
- Monster Jam
- Mr. Bean
- Muhteşem Yüzyıl
- Ninjago
- Oggy and the Cockroaches
- Pawn Stars
- Pokémon
- Power Rangers Beast Morphers
- Power Rangers Dino Charge
- Rescue Me
- Resident Advisors
- Sons of Anarchy
- Spartacus
- Stacked
- Steven Seagal: Lawman
- Strike Back
- Transporter: The Series
- The Unit
- Warehouse 13
- Yin Yang Yo!

=== Sports ===
==== Football ====
- UEFA Europa League (2009-2021)
- UEFA Champions League (2021-)
- Voetbal Inside

==== Motorsports ====
- 24 Hours Nürburgring
- 24 Hours of Daytona
- 24 Hours of Le Mans
- 24 Hours of Zolder
- 2CV 24 Hour Race
- Dubai 24 Hour
- Fuji 24 Hours
- Longest Day of Nelson
- Silverstone Britcar 24-Hour
- Spa 24 Hours

== Teletext ==
RTL 7 offered a teletext service which stopped on 1 April 2017. The pages 888/889 are still available for subtitles.
