= UFA =

Ufa is a city in Russia west of the Urals.

UFA or Ufa may also refer to:

== Other places ==
- Ufa (river), a Belaya tributary in the Urals
- Ufa International Airport, near the Russian city
- Ufa Plateau, a landform the city is on
- Ufa railway station, in the city
- Ufa, Ethiopia, a town in Ginbo District

== Arts and entertainment ==
- UFA GmbH, a German production company
- Up-Front Agency, a Japanese talent agency

== Education ==
- Ursula Franklin Academy, a high school in Toronto, Canada
- Utica Free Academy, a high school in Utica, New York, US
- Université franco-allemande or the Franco-German University

== Government, military and politics ==
- Unified Fire Authority, an emergency agency in Utah
- Uniformed Firefighters Association, the union of the Fire Department of New York
- Ultimate Frisbee Association, a North American frisbee league
- Uniform Firearms Act, a set of laws in the Commonwealth of Pennsylvania
- United Farmers of Alberta, an agricultural co-operative and former political party
- B-588 Ufa, a Project 636.3 Kilo-class submarine of the Russian Navy

== Science and mathematics ==
- Ufa (moth), an insect genus
- Unambiguous finite automaton, a type of nondeterministic automaton in automata theory
- Unit factor analysis, another name for dimensional analysis
- Unsaturated fatty acid, a class of fatty acid nutritional compounds

== Sport ==
- FC Ufa, a Russian football club
- Unrestricted free agent, a sports player without a team
- Uzbekistan Football Association, a governing body
- Ultimate Frisbee Association, a professional Ultimate league in the US
