= TV10 (Dutch TV channel) =

Planned Dutch commercial TV channel

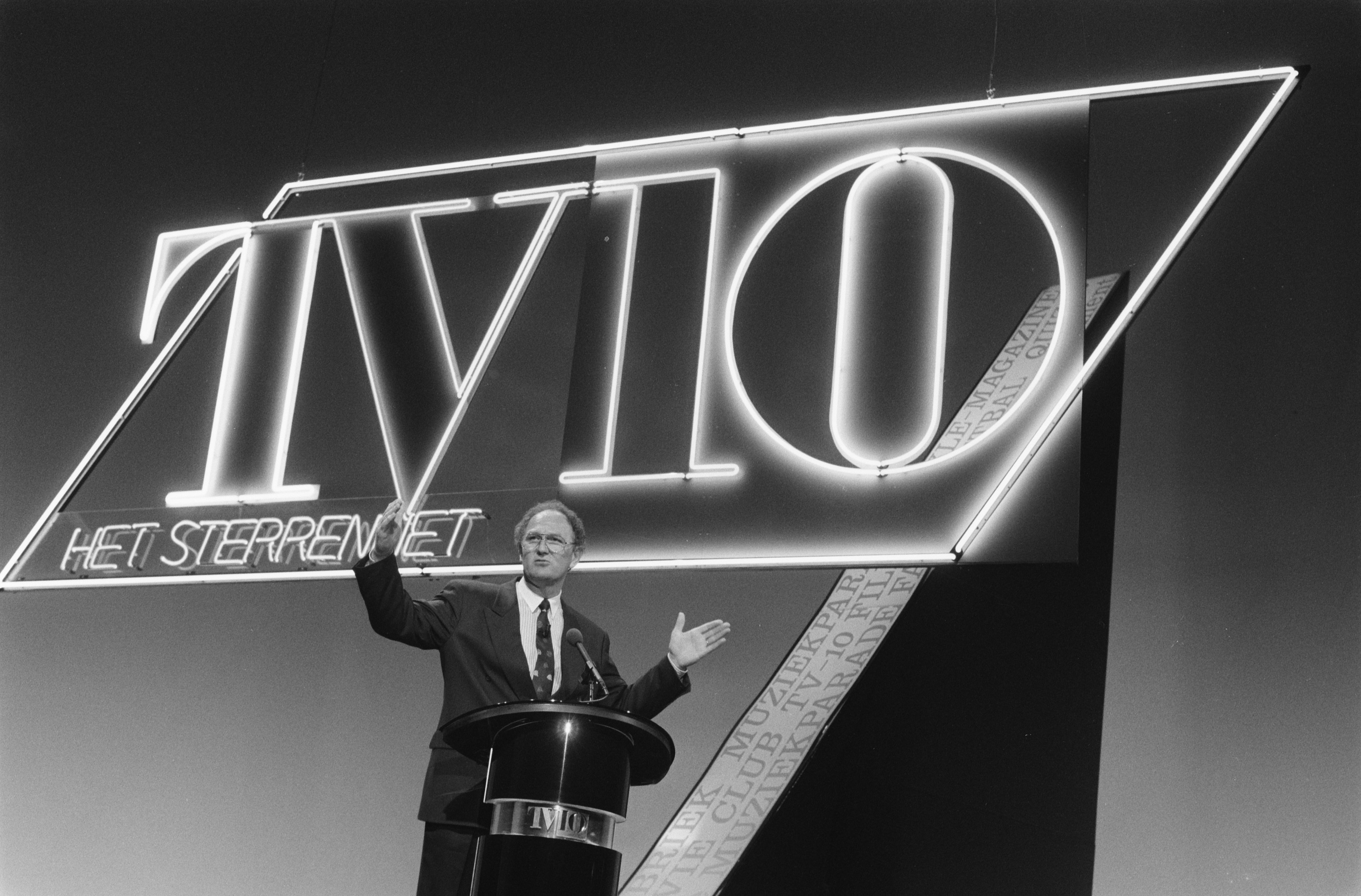
- Country: Netherlands
- Broadcast area: Netherlands

Programming
- Picture format: 576i (SDTV)

History
- Launched: 1 November 1989 (Planned)
- Founder: Peter Jelgersma; Joop van den Ende

TV10 would have been the first official Dutch commercial TV channel airing in the Netherlands. The launch date was set on 1 November 1989. The TV Station was a cooperation between Peter Jelgersma and Joop van den Ende. The Dutch government was, at the time, against commercial television and prohibited it from broadcasting. The channel would have been a general entertainment channel. Eventually, most programs and television celebrities from TV10 moved to competitor RTL Véronique (now known as RTL 4) which had launched under a Luxembourgian television licence.
