= RTL Lounge =

- Country: Netherlands
- Broadcast area: Netherlands
- Headquarters: Hilversum, Netherlands

Programming
- Language: Dutch
- Picture format: 1080i HDTV (downscaled to 16:9 576i for the SDTV feed)

Ownership
- Owner: RTL Group (2009–2025); DPG Media (2025–present)
- Parent: RTL Nederland
- Sister channels: RTL 4 RTL 5 RTL 7 RTL 8 RTL Z RTL Crime; RTL Telekids

History
- Launched: 2 October 2009; 16 years ago

Links
- Website: rtl.nl/rtllounge

Availability

Streaming media
- Ziggo GO: ZiggoGO.tv (Europe only)

RTL Lounge is a Dutch pay television channel dedicated to drama and lifestyle programmes.

It is operated by RTL Nederland and launched on 2 October 2009. Originally, the channel had a Luxembourgish licence, but shifted to a Dutch one from 1 July 2026.

== Programming ==
=== Domestic ===
- Goede tijden, slechte tijden (reruns)

=== Imported ===
- The Bold and the Beautiful
- The Client List
- How to Look Good Naked USA
- Luke Nguyen's Vietnam

== Previous logos ==
2009-2015

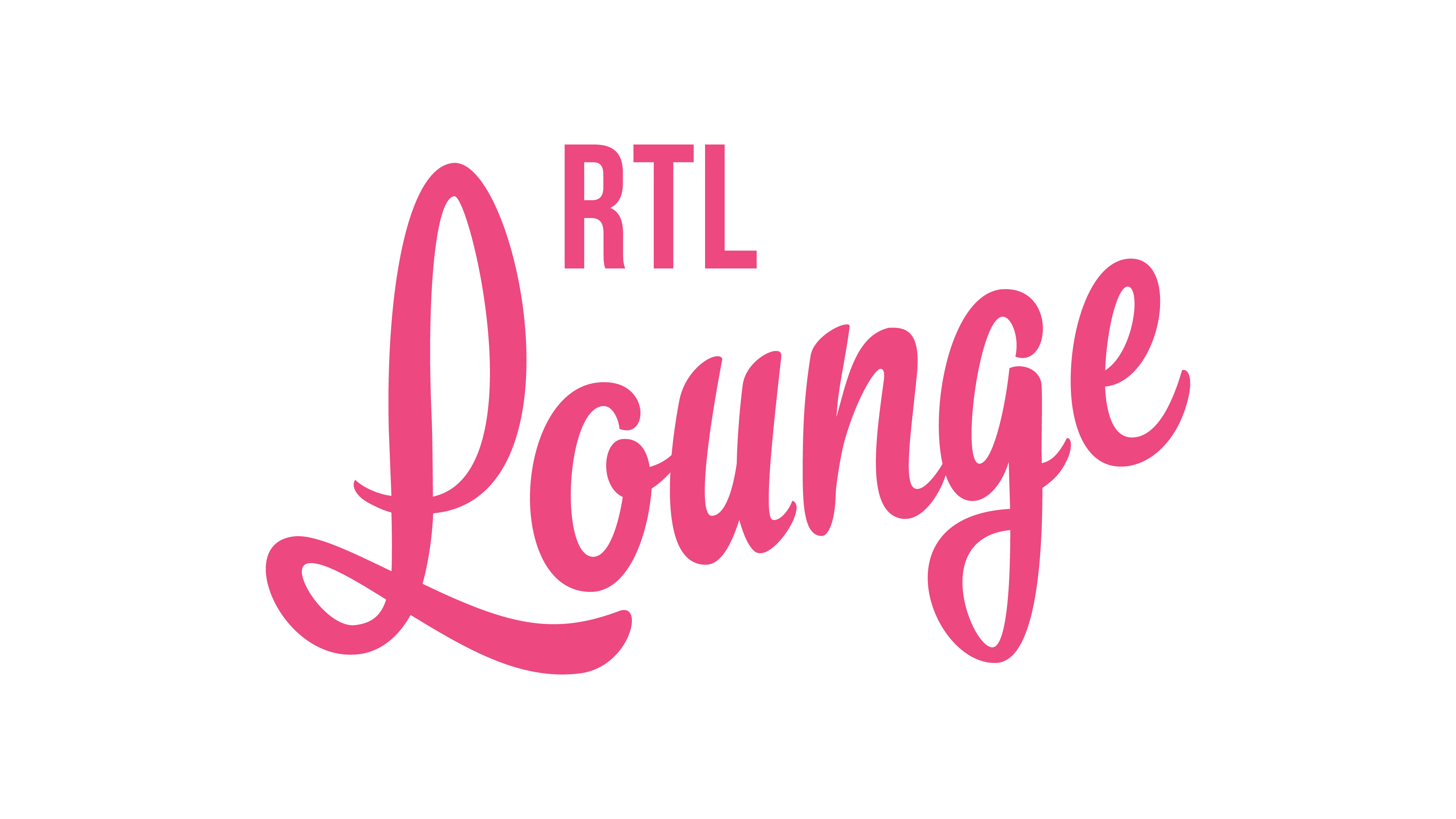
2015-2016

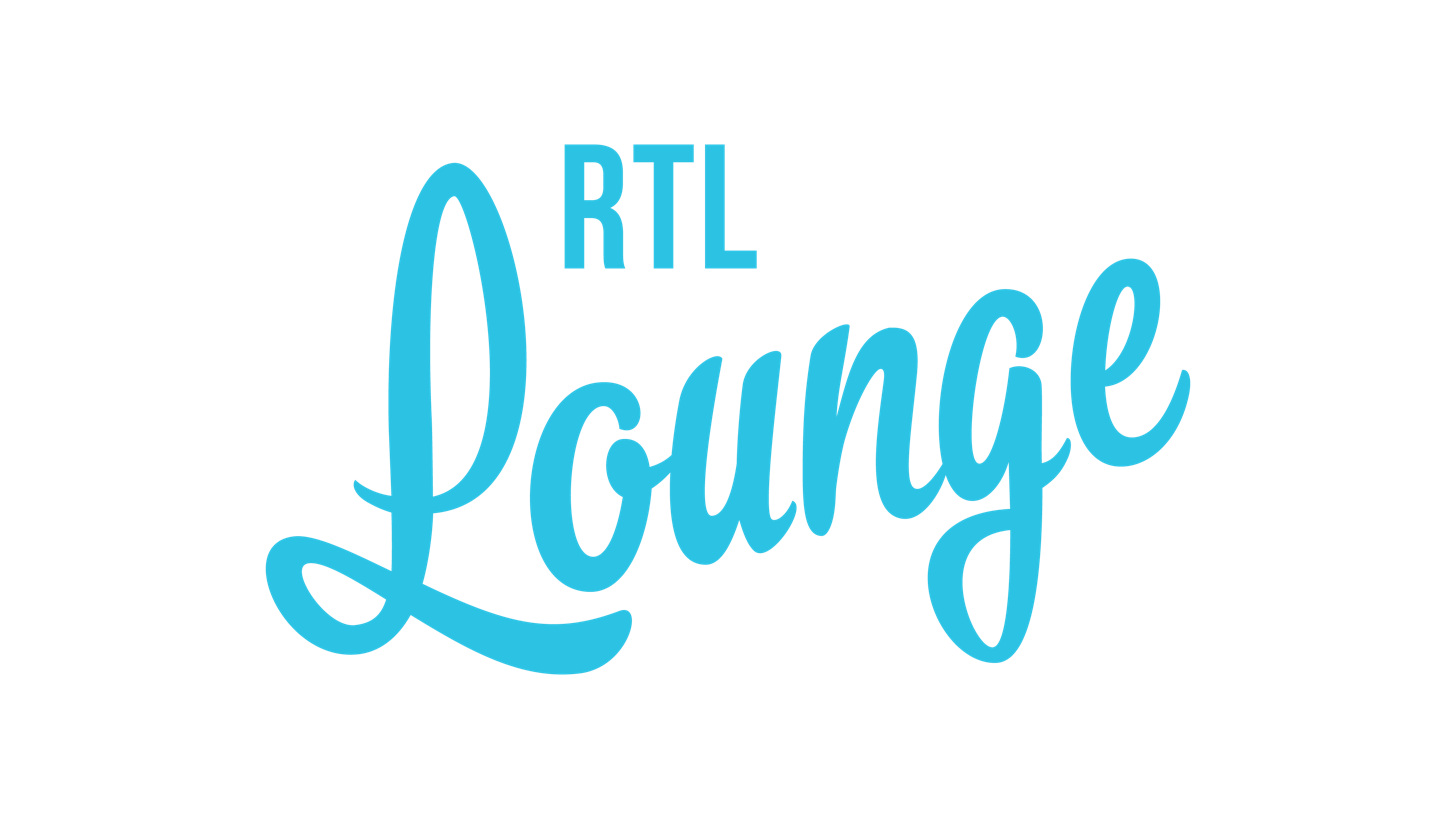
2016-2023
