= RTL Z =

Dutch television channel

- Country: Netherlands
- Broadcast area: Netherlands
- Network: RTL 5 (2001–2005); RTL 7 (2005–2015)
- Headquarters: Hilversum, Netherlands

Programming
- Language: Dutch
- Picture format: 1080i HDTV (downscaled to 16:9 576i for the SDTV feed)

Ownership
- Owner: DPG Media
- Parent: RTL Nederland (2001–present); Belgian Business Television (Roularta Media Group) (2001–2002)
- Sister channels: RTL 4 RTL 5 RTL 7 RTL 8 RTL Lounge; RTL Crime; RTL Telekids

History
- Launched: 6 June 2001 (programming block); 7 September 2015 (own channel)

Links
- Website: www.rtlz.nl

Availability

Terrestrial
- Digitenne: Channel 28 (HD)

Streaming media
- Ziggo GO: ZiggoGO.tv (Europe only)
- KPN iTV Online: Watch live (Europe only)

RTL Z is a Dutch free-to-cable business and financial news television channel. It displays economic changes and the stock exchange news in a banner at the bottom of the screen in the daytime. In the evenings the programming consists of documentaries.

Until 30 June 2026, it broadcast with a Luxembourgish licence, before shifting to a Dutch one as part of a group-wide decision from 1 July 2026.

== History ==
RTL Z started on 6 June 2001 as a joint venture between Holland Media Groep and Belgian Business Television. Belgian Business Television broadcasts Kanaal Z (Canal Z) in Belgium. In 2002, Holland Media Groep took over the programme in its entirety. It was initially broadcast as a programming block on RTL 5 during daytime, and later on RTL 7 from 12 August 2005 until 6 September 2015.

It became a 24-hour channel on September 7, 2015, so that the block on RTL 7 ended. At launch, the new standalone version was available to six million households, but was not available on all basic cable subscriptions, as agreements were only signed with KPN, Ziggo and Vodafone.

On 7 January 2019, RTL Z introduced a new daytime schedule re-emphasizing news and weather.

== Previous logos ==
2005–2014

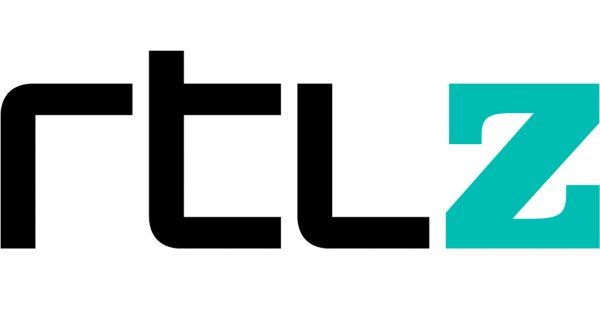
2014–2015

2015–2023
