= RTL 8 =

Dutch free-to-air television channel

- Country: Netherlands
- Broadcast area: Netherlands; Luxembourg
- Headquarters: Hilversum, Netherlands

Programming
- Picture format: 1080i HDTV (downscaled to 16:9 576i for the SDTV feed)

Ownership
- Owner: DPG Media
- Parent: RTL Nederland
- Sister channels: RTL 4 RTL 5 RTL 7 RTL Z RTL Lounge; RTL Crime; RTL Telekids

History
- Launched: 18 August 2007; 19 years ago
- Replaced: Talpa (2005-2006); Tien (2006-2007)

Links
- Website: rtl8.nl

Availability

Terrestrial
- Digitenne: Channel 10 (HD)
- DTT (Luxembourg): 191.5 MHz (SD)

Streaming media
- Ziggo GO: ZiggoGO.tv (Europe only)
- KPN iTV Online: Watch live (Europe only)

RTL 8 is a Dutch free-to-cable television channel that was launched on 18 August 2007 replacing Tien, previously known as Talpa. RTL 8's main target audience consists of women. It broadcasts soap operas, talk shows, films and reruns of programmes from its sister RTL channels. In the mornings and late afternoons children's channel RTL Telekids is broadcasting on RTL 8.

Officially RTL 5 - along with RTL 4, RTL 7 and RTL 8 - is headquartered in Hilversum, broadcasting with a Netherlands TV licence since July 1, 2026. Until 30 June 2026, it used a Luxembourgish TV license. This allowed them to avoid more severe control by the Dutch media authorities as Luxembourg's television watchdog is less strict.

== History ==
The channel started as Talpa, later rebranded as Tien, which was launched by media tycoon John de Mol in August 2005. In 2007 John de Mol's Talpa Media assets were amalgamated with RTL Nederland. In exchange, John de Mol obtained a 26.3% share in RTL Nederland.

RTL Nederland revealed that Tien would be rebranded as RTL 8. Fons van Westerloo, director of RTL Nederland explained that the name of the new RTL channel was chosen as not to conflict with the second largest Dutch commercial television channel, SBS6. RTL 7 got a makeover as well. RTL 8 got The Oprah Winfrey Show, As the World Turns, and the popular Dutch program Gooische Vrouwen. Furthermore, RTL 8 is going to repeat the popular programmes of the other RTL-channels, previously done by RTL 7.

On 18 August 2007 Tien ceased to exist and was taken over by RTL 8.

On 15 October 2009 RTL Nederland started simulcasting their RTL 7 and RTL 8 channels in 1080i high-definition.

== Teletext ==
RTL 8 offered a teletext service which stopped on 1 April 2017. The pages 888/889 are still available for subtitles.

== Logos ==
2007-2012

2012-2017

2017-2023
