= RTL Crime (Dutch TV channel) =

- Country: Netherlands
- Broadcast area: Netherlands
- Headquarters: Hilversum, Netherlands

Programming
- Picture format: 2160p UHDTV

Ownership
- Owner: DPG Media
- Parent: RTL Nederland
- Sister channels: RTL 4 RTL 5 RTL 7 RTL 8 RTL Z RTL Lounge; RTL Telekids

History
- Launched: 1 September 2011; 14 years ago
- Replaced: MisdaadNet (2008-2011)

Links
- Website: http://www.rtl.nl/rtlcrime/

Availability

Streaming media
- Ziggo GO: ZiggoGO.tv (Europe only)

RTL Crime is a Dutch pay television channel dedicated to television crime and reality series. It first launched on 27 November 2006 in Germany and on 1 September 2011 in the Netherlands. It is owned by DPG Media. It replaced MisdaadNet that was owned by Endemol. RTL Crime features a Dutch/English audio track with Dutch subtitles.

An HD-simulcast started through Ziggo on 30 November 2017. Besides this version RTL Deutschland, also part of RTL Group also runs a channel called RTL Crime which is the German variant.

On 1 July 2026, the channel shifted from a Luxembourgish licence to a Dutch one.

== Programming ==
=== Domestic ===
- Moordvrouw (repeats)

=== Imported ===
- Ashes to Ashes
- Bones
- Castle
- Cobra 11
- Criminal Minds
- CSI: Crime Scene Investigation
- CSI: Miami
- CSI: NY
- Fast Forward
- Forensic Files
- The Good Guys
- Homicide Hunter
- Kommissar Rex
- Mission: Impossible
- Shark
- Single-Handed

== Previous logos ==
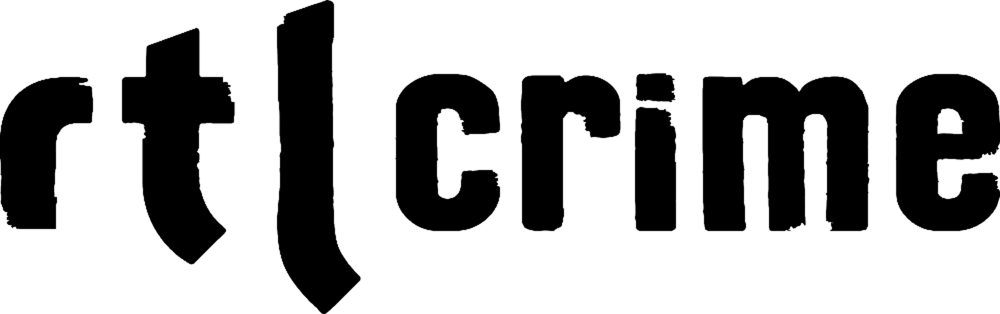
2011-2016

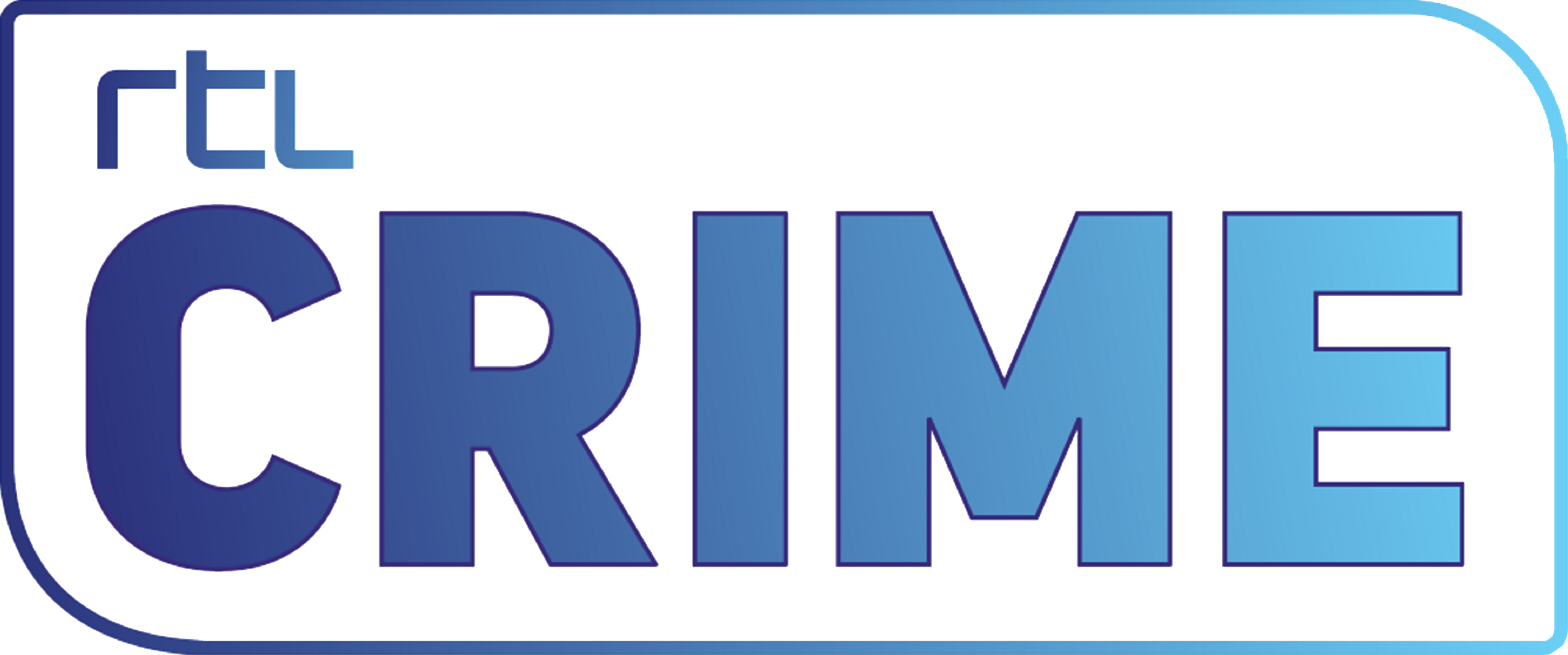
2016-2023
