= 2CV 24 Hour Race =

Motor endurance race

- Category: Endurance
- Country: Great Britain
- Drivers' champion: Various
- Constructors' champion: Various
- Official website: www.2cvracing.org.uk

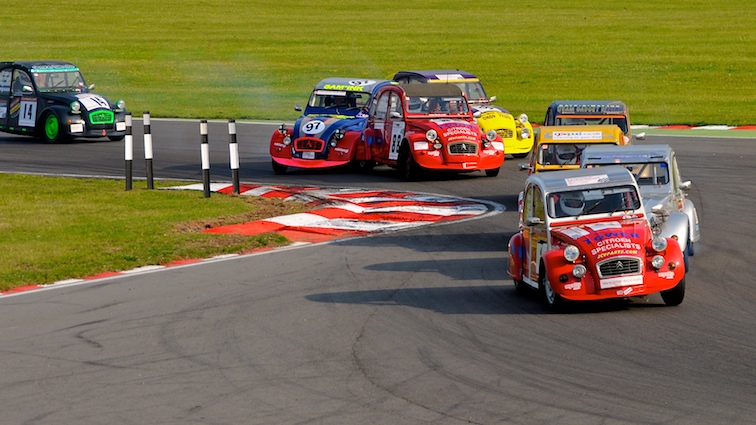
2CV 24 Hour Race Snetterton 2009

The Citroën 2CV 24 Hour Race is an annual 24-hour endurance race for Classic Citroën 2CVs, and is traditionally held in August regularly at the Snetterton Circuit in Norfolk. The race is organised by the Classic 2CV Racing Club, with BARC and MSV.

From 2014 to 2016 the 24hr race was held at the Anglesey Circuit in North Wales. This was due to development of the track, including the Pit Lane area, to enable a 24hr race licence to be granted.

The first 2CV 24hr race was held in 1990 at Mondello Park a short distance from Dublin, and remained at the circuit until 2003 when it moved to Snetterton in Norfolk.

The 2020 Citroën 2CV 24 Hour Race was held at Snetterton Circuit on 28–30 August. The 30th running of the race. It was the only 24 Hour race to take place in the UK in 2020.

The 2020 race was won by 2CV Team Lion 1 with drivers Pete Sparrow, Alec Graham and David O'Keeffe in 662 laps. Pete Sparrow set the fastest lap on the new Snetterton 200 for Club Class 2CV of 1.48.382. Crisis@TeteRouge were 2nd (659 laps) and Team Twin Snails 3rd (655 laps).

The 2019 Liqui Moly Citroën 2CV 24 Hour Race at Snetterton Circuit was won by Team Gadget Racing with Drivers Ainslie Bousfield, Simon Clarke, Lien Davies, Tom Perry in 701 laps. Crisis TeteRouge were 2nd (699 laps) and 2CV Team Lion 1 3rd (689 laps). Pete Sparrow won the 2CVParts.com Championship for the 8th time.

The 2018 Liqui Moly Citroën 2CV 24 Hour Race at Snetterton Circuit was won by Team Beacon Downe with drivers Richard Gardiner, Louis Tyson, Kris Tovey & Peter Rundle in 708 laps. Dan Willans Coaches Team ECAS were 2nd (697 laps) and Team Gadget Racing 3rd (691 laps). Pete Sparrow won the 2CVParts.com Championship for the 7th time.

The 2017 Liqui Moly Citroën 2CV 24 Hour race at Snetterton circuit was won by Team LION 1, with drivers Pete Sparrow, Alec Graham and David O’Keefe in 706 laps. Team ECAS were 2nd (699 laps) and Team Rebellion 3rd (691 laps). Lien Davies won the 2CVParts.com Classic Racing Championship in a Team Gadget Racing car.

The 2016 24 Hour race at the Anglesey circuit was won by 2CV Team LION, with drivers Pete Sparrow, David O'Keeffe and Alec Graham. The 2CVParts.com Championship was won by Lien Davis in a Team Gadget Racing car.

The 2015 24 Hour race was won by Team SeaLion, with drivers Pete Sparrow, Jon Davis, Alec Graham and David O'Keeffe. In the same car, Pete Sparrow won the 2CVParts.com Championship for the 6th time.

The 2014 24 Hour race was won by Team SeaLion, with drivers Pete Sparrow, Jon Davis, Peter Rundle and Paul Rowland. Pete Sparrow in the same car won the 2CVParts.com Championship for the 5th time.

The 2013 24 Hour race was won after 717 laps, by Team Stinky, with drivers Neil Thompson, Neil Savage, Christer Hallgren and Chris Yates. The car's remarkable reliability was the key to the win as other teams succumbed to various mechanical issues. The race remained dry throughout the 24hrs.

The 2012 race was won again by Rent Boys Racing with the same driver line up, and the car once again prepared by Mark Turner. No other team had won this race three times consecutively, any driver line up achieving a hat trick in 24-hour endurance racing is unusual, and only ever been achieved twice previously. Making this achievement one of the most impressive in British motorsport in recent history.

The 2011 race was won by Rent Boys Racing with an unchanged driver line up however for this year the car was prepared by Mark Turner with a second car now part of the team (Rent Boys Racing 2). The car ran faultlessly for the event. The race was on the Snetterton 200 Circuit.

In 2010 the race was won by Rent Boys Racing team with Alec Graham, Meyrick Cox and Nick Paton driving. They completed 738 Laps. Their Best Lap was 1.48.826. Fastest Lap of Race −1.47.098 (Tete Rouge 2)

In 2009 the race was won by the Tete Rouge team with David O'Keeffe, Phil Myatt, Gary Adnitt and Sammie Fritchley driving. They completed 566 Laps (the race was stopped for 5 and a half hours due to Fog). Their Best Lap was 1.47.316. Fastest Lap of Race −1.46.719 (BTM Racing)

In 2008 the race was won by Team Gadget Racing with Wayne Cowling, Ainslie Bousfield, Steve Panas and Simon Clarke driving.

In 2007 the race was won by Team ECAS with Richard Dalton, Gary Byatt, Phil Myatt, Edward Mason driving. They completed 647 laps. They had the Fastest Lap – 2.01.125. Every minute of the race it rained!

In 2006 the race was won by Tete Rouge 1 with Christian Callender, Pete Sparrow, Simon Turner, Simon Leith driving. They completed 662 Laps They had the Fastest Lap – 1.48.036

In 2005 the race was won by Tete Rouge 1 with Paul Robertson, Pete Sparrow, Simon Turner, Colin Whiteley driving. They completed ? laps.

In 2004 the race was won by Dead End Racing with Phil Myatt, Edward Mason, Graham Wallace driving. They completed 740 laps and their Best Lap was 1.47.826. Fastest Lap of Race – 1.47.780 (TEAM GADGET)

In 2003 the race was won by car 80, BAPS Racing. with Ainslie Bousfield, Gary Adnitt, Steve Panas and Mick Storey. They completed a shortened 507 laps due to fog stopping the race. Their Best Lap 1.49.789. Of note was that the Fastest Lap of Race – 1.49.202 (was achieved by 'The Stig' from BBC TOP GEAR - Ben Collins).

Due to the participation of the Television Programme, this race was covered in Series 2, Episode 10 of Top Gear.

The Circuit de Spa-Francorchamps also hosts a 24-hour 2CV race.
