= RTL 4 =

Dutch free-to-air television channel

- Logo used since 2023
- Country: Netherlands
- Broadcast area: Netherlands; Luxembourg
- Headquarters: Hilversum, Netherlands

Programming
- Picture format: 1080i HDTV (downscaled to 16:9 576i for the SDTV feed)

Ownership
- Owner: RTL Group (1989–2025); DPG Media (2025–present)
- Parent: RTL Nederland (2004–present); Holland Media Groep (1997–2004); RTL 4 S.A. (1990–1997)
- Sister channels: RTL 5 RTL 7 RTL 8 RTL Z RTL Lounge; RTL Crime; RTL Telekids

History
- Launched: 2 October 1989; 37 years ago
- Former names: RTL Véronique (1989–1990); RTL 4 Veronique (1990)

Links
- Website: rtl4.nl

Availability

Terrestrial
- Digitenne: Channel 4 (HD)
- DTT (Luxembourg): 498 MHz (SD)

Streaming media
- Ziggo GO: ZiggoGO.tv (Europe only)
- KPN iTV Online: Watch live (Europe only)

RTL 4 (Radio Télévision Luxembourg 4) is a Dutch free TV channel; it is the most-watched commercial station in the country, popular especially with those aged between 20 and 49. RTL 4 is a general entertainment channel with infotainment, television drama, talk shows, game shows, news and talent shows. It is owned by RTL Nederland, a subsidiary of DPG Media. The station has three sister TV channels: RTL 5, RTL 7 and RTL 8, and four thematic TV channels: RTL Z, RTL Lounge, RTL Crime and RTL Telekids.

Officially RTL 4 - along with RTL 5, RTL 7 and RTL 8 - is headquartered in Hilversum, broadcasting under a Netherlands TV licence since July 1, 2026. Until 30 June 2026, the channel was broadcasting with a Luxembourgish TV licence. This allowed them to avoid more strict control by the Dutch media authorities as Luxembourg's television watchdog is less strict. Despite being intended for Dutch audiences, RTL 4 is encrypted on the Dutch DVB-T Digitenne platform but free-to-air in Luxembourg, where it was licensed until 2026.

== History ==
It originally launched on the Astra 1A satellite as RTL Véronique on 2 October 1989, before rebranding as RTL 4 the next year, absorbing some of the assets of TV10, which never launched. 1, 2 and 3 were already used by the Netherlands' public broadcasters. It was one of the first private commercial broadcaster in the Netherlands. Officially, it still broadcasts from Luxembourg. Private broadcasters were not allowed in the Netherlands until 1992.

Less than one month into its existence, the weekly softcore pornographic strand Club Verotique caused massive concerns from British ministers, as RTL Veronique was on the same satellite as the Sky channels, and was free to air across Europe at the time. Ahead of launch, Douglas Hurd announced that he would file a complaint against foreign porn content airing to British households by satellite.

The encryption system employed by both RTL 4 and 5 analogue services while on the Astra 1A and 1C satellites was Luxcrypt. This standard was employed to protect the distribution rights sold by foreign studios to RTL.

RTL 4 broadcasts the first and the longest running soap of the Netherlands, Goede tijden, slechte tijden (since 1 October 1990). Ratings have increased by 1991, which by then had attracted a 30% share in both ratings and advertisers. By 1992, the channel has been steadily growing in the Netherlands, due to the increased penetration of cable television. An RTL 4 fan club was being suggested.

The channel was under attack from the Media Commission in June 1993 for exceeding the limit of 20% commercials per hour, a violation of EU directives. The channel was accused of running ad breaks close to one another, as well as the airing of illicit advertising. The move came at the same time the Dutch government eased advertising restrictions during sports events.

In July 1998, the channel announced a rebrand which made the channel "more serious" with a mixture of news, drama and reality programming, in order to counter a regression in its growth in the previous autumn. A new look developed by Pittard Sullivan was introduced. Some successful shows from the past, such as 5 uur show, were cancelled due to lack of ratings.

Full-time widescreen broadcasts began on 1 June 2007. RTL 4's had a radical change of programming on 18 August 2007 when RTL obtained the football rights (Eredivisie) shared with RTL 7, using the umbrella title RTL Voetbal, but lost the rights to the NOS the following year, also due to the lack of interest by RTL and SBS. In 2008, RTL 4 went back to its roots as a family entertainment channel with programmes such as Idols, X Factor, Dancing with the Stars and Dancing on Ice. That year, RTL 4 also launched Ik hou van Holland, a quiz show around and about the Netherlands with Linda de Mol.

From 2009, talent shows have played a major role in the programming of RTL 4, the X Factor has been rescheduled successfully to Friday night with higher ratings in Season 2 (2009) and Season 3 (2010) on Fridays. In 2010, RTL 4 bought the rights for broadcasting Holland's Got Talent from SBS 6 and created together with pioneer John de Mol their own talent show The Voice of Holland in the autumn of that same year. The Voice of Holland became a huge hit on Dutch television with ratings around 3 million viewers every Friday night. In 2012, yet another new talent show started, Beat the Best.

RTL 4 also owns the rights for the soaps As the World Turns and The Bold and the Beautiful. In January 2007, RTL sold the rights for B&B to SBS6, but repurchased the rights in December 2010. With more money and space to buy other TV shows, RTL 4 bought the rights for the first season of the successful drama show Brothers & Sisters and took over CSI: Miami from sister channel RTL 5.

Television host Peter van der Vorst has been appointed Content and Marketing Director of RTL Nederland. He started on 1 March 2019.

== Radio ==
From May 1991 until September 2006, the station has had several accompanying radio stations, such as RTL 4 Radio, RTL Radio, RTL Rock Radio, Happy RTL, and RTL FM. Between June 2007 and 1 January 2012 RTL Nederland owned Radio 538, one of the largest radio stations of the Netherlands; the station was sold to Talpa, which is RTL's commercial competitor on television.

== Identity ==
=== 1989–1990 ===
The first look as RTL Véronique was designed by Top Drawers, who did the same for the VPRO. It consisted of a red, white and blue all-caps VERONIQUE wordmark, while the graphics were 3D featuring American-style skyscrapers. The channel executives Lex Harding and Ruud Hendriks told designer Willem van den Berg that American elements were to be used because, according to RTL, the United States were the example for commercial television. For efficiency, RTL decided to make all of its graphics for the Dutch channel from Luxembourg, which led to communication problems between French designers, the Luxembourgish parent and the Dutch office. The jingle was composed by Thompson Creative, whose owner Larry Thompson went to the Netherlands on purpose, with the master tapes to latter add a Veronique sonic logo in Dutch. The channel's menu and break bumpers used a track from the Carlin Production Music library.

=== 1990–1997 ===
Seeing the success of the Zet'm op 4 (Put it on 4) promotional campaign that began in December 1989, Veronique's name recognition grew. Partly due to its success, the channel adopted the RTL 4 name on 17 September 1990. This also included an all-new look and logo, with an all-italic logo featuring a 4 in a red circle (later changed to yellow). The design was originally used for the aborted TV10, with the jingle being re-recorded to feature the channel's name. The audio package was composed by Hans van Eijck.

=== 1997–1998 ===
Facing ratings losses in the mid-90s, the channel introduced a modified version of its circle 4 logo in the summer of 1997, without the RTL wordmark, here resembling a sun. The music was, again, composed by Hans van Eijck.

=== 1998–2001 ===
In an attempt to rebound RTL 4's public image and ratings following a series of rating regressions, the channel initiated a task force, led by Bert van de Weer. The new look was designed by the US agency Pittard Sullivan, while the music was composed by Bernhard Joosten Music Productions. The new logo was a black rectangle with a lowercase RTL wordmark, with an orange quarter-circle with a 4 in it. Rob van den Berg was in charge of additional seasonal elements.

=== 2001–2004 ===
A new look was introduced, putting emphasis on "ordinary people". This coincided with the creation of the in-house design team RTL Creatie, led by Geert van Ooijen. Bernhard Joosten continued to be in charge of the music.

=== 2004–2007 ===
Logo from 2005 until 2013

A new variation on the topic of "ordinary people" was introduced in 2004. The logo changed in August 2005, when this look was in use, due to the renaming of Yorin as RTL7 and the unification of the branding of the three channels.

=== 2007–2008 ===
The conversion of the channel to widescreen in June 2007 prompted RTL 4 to introduce a new identity. This time, the idents featured the stars of RTL 4's programmes, as well as a backstage view in which the camera did a 360º rotation. The music was composed by Stephen Emmer, who did the same for RTL Boulevard and Yorin.

=== 2008–2013 ===
A "calmer" identity was unveiled on 1 February 2008, seen by programme director Erland Galjaard as "providing a rest point for the channel", while also increasing its recognition and distinction. The first themed idents came on Valentine's Day. The package used during this period had a large segmented version of the 4 mark, accompanied by flying objects, as well as programme or season-specific idents. The music was composed by Stephen Emmer for the second look in a row, through his company E-station.

=== 2013–2023 ===
Logo from 2013 until 2016

Logo from 2016 until 2023

Findesign created a new look and logo for RTL 4 in 2013, featuring a numeral 4 divided in four segments, three of them orange. It was adopted at the beginning of the new television season on 26 August. In 2016, the RTL wordmark changed, coinciding with the adoption of a uniform wordmark for RTL Nederland.

=== 2023–present ===
On 1 May 2023, in line with the corporate parent rolling out the RTL United rebrand campaign in the four countries where it operates television channels, RTL 4 adopted a new logo featuring the new corporate template, based on the longtime logo of the German channel, in three shades of orange.

== Notable television presenters ==
- Vivienne van den Assem (2018–present)
- Carlo Boszhard (1993–present)
- Robert ten Brink (2006–present)
- Daphne Bunskoek (2005–2008, 2013, 2018–present)
- Pepijn Crone (2015–present)
- Marieke Elsinga (2016–present)
- Beau van Erven Dorens (1998–2005, 2007–2009, 2015–present)
- Natasja Froger (2010–present)
- Angela Groothuizen (2009–present)
- John van den Heuvel (2001–present)
- Luuk Ikink (2013–present)
- Chantal Janzen (2005–2006, 2011–present)
- Nicolette Kluijver (2014–present)
- Martijn Krabbé (1995–present)
- Pernille La Lau (2006–2008, 2010–present)
- Paul de Leeuw (2013–2014, 2018–present)
- Marc van der Linden (2003–present)
- Bridget Maasland (2007–2012, 2016–present)
- Ruben Nicolai (2015–present)
- Antoin Peeters (2002–present)
- Katja Schuurman (2018–present)
- Gaston Starreveld (1990–present)
- Humberto Tan (2007–2012, 2013–present)
- Caroline Tensen (1989–1999, 2019–present)
- Quinty Trustfull (2006, 2008–present)
- Thomas Verhoef (2005–present)
- John Williams (1995–present)
- Frits Wester (1994–present)
- Vivian Boelen (1991–2012)
- Patty Brard (1989–1990, 1994, 2011–2013, 2018)
- Nicolette van Dam (2008–2015)
- Wendy van Dijk (2006–2019)
- Gordon (2007–2018)
- Olcay Gulsen (2016–2019)
- Jan de Hoop (1989–2022)
- Mariska Hulscher (200?–200?)
- Twan Huys (2018–2019)
- Eva Jinek (2020–2023)
- Jeroen van Koningsbrugge (2008–2019)
- Char Margolis (2002–2008, 2010)
- Jaap van Meekren (1989–1993)
- Linda de Mol (2007–2019)
- Irene Moors (1989–2016)
- Derek Ogilvie (2007–2013)
- Jeroen Pauw (1989–2000)
- Jur Raatjes (1989–1999)
- Art Rooijakkers (2018–2024)
- Loretta Schrijver (1989–2007, 2010–2025)
- Rudolph van Veen (2000–2005, 2008–2011)
- Peter van der Vorst (2006–2019)
- Peter R. de Vries (1995–1998, 2006–2010, 2013–2021)
- Merel Westrik (2014–2019)

== Teletext ==
RTL 4 offered a teletext service which stopped on 1 April 2017. The pages 888/889 are still available for subtitles.
