= RTL 5 =

Dutch television network

- Country: Netherlands
- Broadcast area: Netherlands; Luxembourg
- Headquarters: Hilversum, Netherlands

Programming
- Picture format: 1080i HDTV (downscaled to 16:9 576i for the SDTV feed)

Ownership
- Owner: DPG Media
- Parent: RTL Nederland (2004–present); Holland Media Groep (1997–2004); RTL 4 S.A. (1993–1997)
- Sister channels: RTL 4 RTL 7 RTL 8 RTL Z RTL Lounge; RTL Crime

History
- Launched: 2 October 1993; 33 years ago
- Former names: RTL V (1993–1994); RTL 5 Nieuws & Weer (1997–1998)

Links
- Website: www.rtl5.nl

Availability

Terrestrial
- Digitenne: Channel 5 (HD)
- DTT (Luxembourg): 498 MHz (SD)

Streaming media
- Ziggo GO: ZiggoGO.tv (Europe only)
- KPN iTV Online: Watch live (Europe only)

RTL 5 is a Dutch free-to-cable television channel that was launched on 2 October 1993, during the 4th anniversary of its sister channel. It is RTL Nederland's "youth & young adults channel" which mainly broadcasts American films and hit series but also reality shows, comedy, travel, international shows and local productions including Expeditie Robinson, Holland's Next Top Model & Benelux' Next Top Model, Dutch versions of America's Next Top Model, the Dutch version of Project Catwalk, So You Think You Can Dance and a Dutch version of ITV's Take Me Out.

Officially RTL 5 - along with RTL 4, RTL 7 and RTL 8 - is headquartered in Hilversum, broadcasting with a Netherlands TV licence since July 1, 2026. Until 30 June 2026, the TV station has been broadcasting with a Luxembourgish TV license. This allowed them to avoid more severe control by the Dutch media authorities as Luxembourg's television watchdog is less strict.

== History ==
=== Early years ===
RTL 4 planned the creation of an RTL 5 as early as March 1992. The group conducted a feasibility study to create a second channel for targets that were not properly served by the main channel. In a board meeting at the end of June 1993, CLT publicly announced a 2 October launch date, aiming to complement the broader RTL 4. Executives believed that RTL 5 was set to start at the right time, and that the new channel would help develop the Dutch commercial television market. The channel planned to receive US$2,60 per subscriber for its cable fees during its first year of operation.

RTL 5 started as RTL V via the Astra 1C satellite on 2 October 1993. The programming mainly consists of shows about cars and programmes for men. Opening night started at 6pm with a preview programme that was partly simulcast with RTL 4, presented by Jan Lenferink, in which its guests searched for "the other side of television". It was followed by the film Dead Poets Society at 8pm, and at 10:05pm, Saturdaynight Five, featuring "a quiz that is not a quiz and a survey" into the preferences of the progressive Netherlands, with various styles of "top level" music. After an episode of The Twilight Zone (at 11:30pm), the evening finished at midnight with an eight-hour reading of Freek de Jonge's book Neerlands Bloed (Dutch Blood) over an eight-hour period, recorded at the Concertgebouw in May 1991. De Jonge had previously appeared in the launch of RTL Veronique four years earlier and "reappeared" in the form of a video recording. In 1994 it changed the Roman number V into 5.

=== RTL 5 under the early days of HMG ===
In February 1995, Veronica joined RTL 4 S.A., starting a joint venture called HMG (Holland Media Groep). Two of the channels already had defined targets (RTL 4 continued being a family channel and Veronica was set to be a youth channel), but RTL 5 "clashed" with RTL 4, causing the channel to find a new formula. In March, its founding director Fons von Westerloo left the channel and was appointed for the same position on the upstart network SBS6. Program coordinator Bart in't Houd also left the channel to join the same post on the new service.

With three major channels RTL could disrupt the television market in the Netherlands. A recommendation from the European Commission suggested the sale of RTL 5 to another company, with SBS Broadcasting being interested. The Competition Commission suggested by mid-September to formally create HMG only if RTL 5 was sold and if Endemol's share was reduced to a symbolic level.

=== Attempted reconversion to a news and weather format ===
In the summer of 1996, the channel was aimed at reconverting itself into a news channel, but HMG executives were still pending a final decision. Under pressure of the European Commission the channel was rebranded as RTL 5 Nieuws & Weer (in English: RTL 5 News & Weather) between 1997 and 1998. RTL 5 became a thematic news channel, with an 8pm news bulletin competing against the main edition of NOS Journaal. It also provided a ten-minute Weer & Verkeer (weather and traffic) bulletin after the main news. Weeks after the launch of the new format, SBS Broadcasting tried suing RTL 5 in front of the European Commission, under the grounds that HMG was not following EC recommendations in becoming a theme channel. Part of its line-up still consisted of feature films, going against the news channel concept, and one of the new local programmes, 5 in het land, was similar to SBS6's Hart van Nederland. The EC suggested a gradual removal of the general entertainment fare in order to finish the conversion.

=== Repositioning ===
With the launch of NET5 in 1999, the channel changed its format again. The channel withdrew its news and weather format and increased its target demographic. In September 2000, the European Commission reversed the restrictions on RTL 5 because competitive channels had been launched in the Netherlands. On 5 June 2001, a Business and Financial News block called RTL Z started on RTL 5 during daytime. Regular RTL 5 programming started at 6pm. RTL Z moved from RTL 5 to RTL 7 on 12 August 2005.

=== Since 2005 ===
Since then, in conjunction with the RTL rebrand, RTL 5 has become a 24-hours channel. It also absorbed the programmes of the former Yorin channel, while RTL 7, the former Yorin, took RTL5's former output.

On 15 January 2024, a new season of Big Brother premiered on the channel and on Videoland.

== Identity ==
=== 1993–1994 ===
The channel's first logo was a lowercase handwritten rtl wordmark in front of a large Roman numberal 5 (V). The launch jingle, composed by Hans Van Ejick, was Let's Take 5.

=== 1994–1997 ===
The logo was replaced with one similar to RTL 4's, using 5 inside a circle. The channel unveiled a new look in 1996 featuring some sort of hallway with the RTL 5 logo in the door. During this look, a library track was used. At closedown, the national anthem of Luxembourg, accompanied by aerial shots of the country, was played.

=== 1997–1998 ===
On 1 January 1997, the channel adopted a new look to match the proposed all-news format. The package mainly consisted of an ident and an intro for Weer & Verkeer. The menu was also changed accordingly.

=== 1998–1999 ===
With the withdrawal of the plans to make it a news channel, it adopted a red square as its logo, in a white background.

=== 1999–2004 ===
This look was designed by Valkieser and featured a white 5 inside a circle divided in two yellow "claws", doing several activities depending on the ident. These ended with a stinger composed by Hans Van Ejick, which was later reworked by Stephen Emmer.

=== 2004–2005 ===
RTL 5 withdrew its minimalistic 1999 look after five years in August 2004 with the start of the new television season, alongside Yorin. The graphics mainly featured the RTL 5 logo rendered in CGI.

=== 2005–2012 ===
RTL 5 adopted a new logo with red as its dominant colour in 2005, as part of the new corporate identity, and also the arrival of programmes from the former Yorin as part of a content exchange.

=== 2012–2017 ===
In September 2012, RTL 5 adopted a separate logo with its own wordmark; the central piece is the red number 5 which is used as a character in its own right.

=== 2017–2023 ===
The look only included bumpers for the following programme and a menu.

=== 2023–present ===
The introduction of the RTL United brand on RTL Nederland saw RTL 5 adopt the three boxes template, in two shades of red and one in pink.

== Series and shows currently on air ==
- Ambulance
- Ambulance Australia
- Big Brother
- Big Brother Australia (from series 12)
- Bondi Vet
- De Augurkenkoning
- Dr. Phil
- Expeditie Robinson
- Gordon Ramsay's 24 Hours to Hell and Back
- Holland's Next Top Model
- RTL De Journaal

== Series and shows previously shown or on hiatus ==
- 'Allo 'Allo!
- 18 Wheels of Justice
- 21 Jump Street
- 24
- 24: Live Another Day
- ALF
- A.U.S.A.
- Adam Zkt. Eva
- Age of Love
- Airwolf
- Aliens in America
- America's Next Top Model
- American Horror Story
- Australia's Next Top Model
- Babylon 5
- Bad Girls Club
- Balls of Steel
- Beauty and the Geek
- Benelux' Next Top Model
- Biker Mice from Mars
- Bionic Woman
- Bodyshockers
- Bones
- Breaking Bad
- Breakout Kings
- Britain's Missing Top Model
- Britain's Next Top Model
- Burn Notice
- Cashmere Mafia
- Celebrity Rehab with Dr. Drew
- Chuck
- Cobra 11
- C.O.P.S
- Crossing Lines
- CSI: Crime Scene Investigation
- CSI: Cyber
- CSI: Miami
- CSI: NY
- Dames in de Dop (Ladette to Lady)
- Dangerous Curves
- Days of Our Lives
- Degrassi: The Next Generation
- Dharma & Greg
- Dollhouse
- Don't Trust the B— in Apartment 23
- Drop Dead Diva
- Echte Meisjes
- Everybody Loves Raymond
- Friends
- Game of Thrones
- Glee
- Gossip Girl
- Greek
- Grimm
- Hannibal
- Helicopter Heroes
- Heroes
- Hidden Palms
- Hotter Than My Daughter
- House
- How I Met Your Mother
- Huge
- Human Target
- Idols
- Jensen!
- Kees van der Spek: Oplichters Aangepakt
- Kitchen Nightmares
- Kyle XY
- In Plain Sight
- Ink Master
- Impractical Jokers
- Janice & Abbey
- Ladette to Lady
- Las Vegas
- Last Man Standing
- Late Show with David Letterman
- LAX
- Leverage
- Lie to Me
- Life
- Life Unexpected
- Lipstick Jungle
- Make It or Break It
- MasterChef
- MasterChef Australia
- Melissa & Joey
- Mercy
- Mighty Morphin Power Rangers
- Mijn Tent is Top (My Restaurant Rules) (moved to RTL 4)
- Modern Family
- Motive
- My Name Is Earl
- New Girl
- NewsRadio
- Oz
- Paradise Hotel
- Passion Cove
- Past Life
- Point Pleasant
- Pretty Little Liars
- Project Catwalk
- Project Runway
- Prison Break
- Raising Hope
- Renegade
- Robin Hood
- Robson Arms
- Rock School
- Royal Pains
- Rude Tube
- Running in Heels
- Saving Grace
- Secret Diary of a Call Girl
- Seinfeld
- Sleepy Hollow
- Smash
- So You Think You Can Dance
- So You Think You Can Dance: The Next Generation
- So You Think You Can Dance USA
- Spartacus
- Star Wars: The Clone Wars
- Stingers
- Suits
- Survival of the Richest
- Tabatha Takes Over
- Terra Nova
- Terriers
- The Americans
- The Benny Hill Show
- The Blacklist
- The Blacklist: Redemption
- The Cosby Show
- The Ellen DeGeneres Show
- The Event
- The Fashion Show
- The Glades
- The Golden Cage
- The Inside
- The Janice Dickinson Modeling Agency
- The King of Queens
- The L Word
- The Millionaire Matchmaker
- The Nanny
- The Phone
- The Rachel Zoe Project
- The Secret Life of the American Teenager
- The Simple Life
- The Sketch Show
- The Strip
- The Tribe
- The Tyra Banks Show
- The Ultimate Dance Battle
- The Unit
- The Unusuals
- The Vampire Diaries
- Third Watch
- Transporter: The Series
- Trauma
- Treasure Hunters
- True Beauty
- True Blood
- True Jackson, VP
- Tyrant
- Van etter tot engel (Brat Camp)
- Vijf tegen Vijf (Family Feud)
- White Collar
- Wipeout

== Teletext ==
RTL 5 offered a teletext service which stopped on 1 April 2017. The pages 888/889 are still available for subtitles.

== Logos ==
RTL 5's seventh from 1999 to 2004

RTL 5's eighth from 2004 to 2005

RTL 5's ninth logo from 2005 to 2012

RTL 5's tenth logo from 2012 to 2017

RTL 5's eleventh logo from 2017 to 2023
