= List of assets owned by Bertelsmann =

This is a list of assets owned by German conglomerate Bertelsmann.

== Arvato ==
- Mohn Media Gruppe
- Prinovis - joint-venture with Axel Springer and Gruner + Jahr
- Sonopress in Germany, North America, Latin America, South Africa, Australia
- Arvato Services
- Arvato Systems
- Arvato Mobile
- Arvato Finances
- Empolis

== Bertelsmann Printing Group ==
- AZ Direct
- Berryville Graphics
- Campaign
- Coral Graphics
- DeutschlandCard
- GGP Media
- MBS Nürnberg
- Mohn Media
- Offset Paperback Manufacturers (OPM)
- Prinovis
- rtv media group
- Sonopress
- Vogel Druck

== Direct Group ==
- Bertelsmann BookClub (China)
- Bertrand (Portugal)
- BMG Music Service
- BOL China
- BOL Great Britain
- BCA Great Britain
- BDMI
- Bookspan (United States) (50%)
  - Architects & Designers Book Service
  - Behavioral Science Book Club
  - Black Expressions
  - Book-of-the-Month Club
  - Children's Book-of-the-Month Club
  - Computer Books Direct
  - Country Homes & Gardens
  - Crafter's Choice
  - Discovery Channel Book Club
  - Doubleday Book Club
  - Doubleday Large Print
  - Early Childhood Teachers Club
  - Equestrian
  - The Good Cook
  - History Book Club
  - Intermediate & Middle Grades Book Club
  - The Library of Speech-Language Pathology
  - The Literary Guild
  - The Military Book Club
  - Mystery Guild
  - One Spirit
  - Outdoorsman's Edge
  - Nurse's Book Society
  - Primary Teachers' Book Club
  - Reader's Subscription
  - Rhapsody
  - Scientific American Book Club
  - Science Fiction Book Club
- Circulo de Lectores (Spain)
- Círculo de Leitores (Portugal)
- Der Club (Germany)
- Donauland (Austria)
- ECI (Netherlands)
- France Loisirs (France)
- Quebec Loisirs (Canada)
- The BookClub (Korea)
- CDnow

== RTL Group (75.1%) ==
- Internet
  - Atresplayer
    - Flooxer
  - M6
  - RTL.de
  - RTL.nl
  - Videoland.nl
  - sport.de
  - turbo.fr
- Programming and Distribution
  - Fremantle
    - Original Productions
      - Amygdala Music
  - Random House Studio (transferred from Penguin Random House in 2016)
    - Random House Films
    - Random House Television
  - Buzzr
  - Naked Television (United Kingdom)
    - Naked West
  - Talkback (United Kingdom)
  - Thames (United Kingdom)
  - Castlefield (United Kingdom)
  - Moskito Television (Finland)
  - Rakett (Norway)
  - Wild Blue Media (United Kingdom)
  - One Big Happy Family (Norway)
  - Baluba (Sweden)
  - Monster Media AS (Norway)
  - Dr Pluto Films (United Kingdom)
  - Blu A/S (Denmark)
  - No Pictures Please (Netherlands)
  - Label1 (United Kingdom)
  - Strong Productions (Denmark)
  - Production House (Finland)
  - Novemberfilm (Norway)
  - Wildside (Italy)
  - Eureka Productions (Australia)
  - The Apartment Pictures (Italy)
  - Blue Circle (Netherlands)
  - Full Fat TV (United Kingdom)
  - Kwaï (France)
  - Miso Film (Denmark)
  - UFA Film & TV Productions (Germany)
    - UFA Fiction
    - UFA Serial Drama
    - UFA Show & Factual
    - UFA Documentary
  - Abot Hameiri Communication Ltd. (Israel)
  - Easy Tiger (Australia)
  - Wavy (Italy)
  - Fremantle Australia
  - Dancing Ledge Productions (United Kingdom)
  - Man Alive Entertainment (United Kingdom)
  - Grillifilms (Finland)
  - Playroom (Norway)
  - Strix Television (Sweden/Norway/Netherlands/Belgium)
  - The Immigrant (United States/Spain/Latin America)
  - Euston Films (United Kingdom)
  - Fiction Valley (Netherlands)
  - Element Pictures (Republic of Ireland)
    - Light House Cinema (Dublin)
      - Road House Cinema
    - Pálás Cinema (Galway)
    - Volta (Irish film VOD service)
    - Element Pictures Distribution
- Radio
  - 104.6 RTL (Berlin)
  - Antenne Bayern (Germany)
  - Antenne Mecklenburg (Germany)
  - Antenne Thueringen (Germany)
  - Bel RTL (Belgium)
  - Radio Contact (Belgium)
  - RTL Radio Letzebuerg (Luxembourg)
  - Eldoradio (Luxembourg)
  - Europa FM (Spain)
  - Fun Radio (France)
  - Hit-Radio Antenne (Germany)
  - Melodia FM (Spain)
  - Oldie 95 (Hamburg)
  - Onda Cero (Spain)
  - Radio Hamburg (Hamburg)
  - Radio NRW (Germany)
  - Radio Ton (Germany)
  - RTL (France)
  - RTL 2 (France)
  - RTL Radio - Deutschlands Hit-Radio (Germany, Belgium, northern France)
- Television
  - Atresmedia (Spain)
    - Antena 3
    - Atreseries
    - LaSexta
    - Neox
    - Nova
    - Mega
    - Atresmedia Cine
    - Atresmedia Studios
  - Groupe M6 (France)
    - M6
    - W9
    - 6ter
    - Paris Première
    - Téva
    - M6 Music
    - Gulli
    - Canal J
    - Tiji
    - FC Girondins de Bordeaux
    - Série Club
    - M6 Films
    - Groupe MCM
      - MCM
      - MCM Top
      - RFM TV
  - Mediengruppe RTL Deutschland (Germany)
    - n-tv
    - RTL Television
    - RTLplus
    - RTL Crime (German TV channel)
    - RTL Living
    - RTL Passion
    - RTL Zwei
    - Super RTL
    - Toggo Plus
    - GEO Television
    - Nitro
    - VOX
  - RTL Magyarország (Hungary)
    - Cool TV
    - Film+
    - Muzsika TV
    - RTL Gold
    - RTL II
    - RTL Klub
    - RTL+
    - Sorozat+
  - RTL Nederland (The Netherlands)
    - RTL 4
    - RTL 5
    - RTL 7
    - RTL 8
    - RTL Z
    - RTL Telekids
    - RTL Crime
    - RTL Lounge
    - RTL XL
  - RTL Televizija (Croatia)
    - RTL 2
    - RTL Kockica
    - RTL Croatia World
  - RTL Télé Lëtzebuerg
    - RTL Zwee

== Gruner + Jahr ==
- Magazines
  - Europe
    - Claudia (Poland)
    - Focus (Italy) (50%)
    - Mia (Spain)
    - Muy Interesante (Spain)
    - Naj (Poland)
    - National Geographic (Poland)
    - News (Austria)(56.03%)
    - Tele-Loisirs (France)
    - Top Girl (Italy)
    - TV Times (Austria) (56.03%)
  - Germany
    - art
    - Brigitte
    - Capital
    - Eltern
    - Essen & Trinken
    - P.M.
    - Schöner Wohnen
    - Stern
- Newspapers
  - Sächsische Zeitung (60%)

== Penguin Random House ==
- Dorling Kindersley Limited
  - Alpha Books
  - DK Eyewitness Travel
- Knopf Doubleday Publishing Group
  - Alfred A. Knopf
  - Anchor Books
  - Black Swan
  - Corgi
  - Doubleday
  - Everyman's Library
  - Nan A. Talese
  - Pantheon
  - Schocken
  - Vintage Books
  - Vintage Crime/Black Lizard
  - Vintage Español
- Penguin Publishing Group
  - Avery Publishing
  - Berkley Books
    - Ace Books
    - Jove Books
    - New American Library
      - Plume
      - Obsidian
      - Onyx
      - Roc Books
      - Signet Books
      - Signet Classics
      - Signet Fiction
      - Topaz
  - DAW
  - Dutton
  - Family Tree Books
  - G. P. Putnam's Sons
    - Amy Enborne
    - Marian Wood
    - Coward-McCann
  - Krause Publications
  - Impact Books
  - Interweave
  - North Light Books
  - Pelican Books
  - Penguin Books
    - Awa Press
    - Michael Joseph
    - Penguin General
      - Fig Tree Books
      - Hamish Hamilton
      - Penguin Life
      - Penguin Business
      - Sandycove Books
      - Viking Books UK
    - Penguin Press
      - Allen Lane Books
      - Particular Books
      - Pelican Books
      - Penguin Classics
  - Pamela Dorman Books
  - Popular Woodworking Books
  - Portfolio
  - Riverhead Books
  - Sentinel
  - Square Peg
  - TarcherPerigee
  - Transworld Publishers
  - Viking Press
  - Vintage Classics
  - Vintage Paperback
  - Writer's Digest Books
  - Yellow Jersey
- Penguin Random House Digital Publishing Group
  - Books on Tape
  - Listening Library
  - Living Language
  - Penguin Random House Audio Publishing
  - Penguin Random House Puzzles & Games
  - Penguin Audio
  - Random House Audio
  - Random House Large Print
  - Random House Reference
  - Sasquatch Books
    - Little Bigfoot
    - Spruce Books
- Penguin Random House International
  - Zahar
  - Penguin Random House Australia
    - Penguin Books Australia
  - Penguin Random House Canada
    - Anchor Canada
    - Appetite by Random House
    - Bond Street Books
    - Doubleday Canada
    - Hamish Hamilton Canada
    - Knopf Canada
    - McClelland & Stewart
      - Douglas Gibson Books
      - Emblem Books
      - New Canadian Library
      - Tundra Books
    - Penguin Canada
      - Penguin Teen
      - Puffin Canada
    - Random House Canada
    - Signal
    - Strange Light
    - Viking Canada
    - Vintage Canada
  - Penguin Random House Group (UK)
    - Cornerstone Publishing
      - Arrow
        - Young Arrow
      - Century
      - Del Rey UK
      - Hutchinson
      - Random House UK
      - William Heinemann
        - #Merky Books
      - Random House Business
      - Windmill
    - Ebury Publishing
      - BBC Books
      - Ebury Press
      - Ebury Edge
      - Pop Press
      - Rider
      - Vermilion
      - Virgin Books (90%)
      - WH Allen
      - Witness Books
    - Penguin Random House Audio (UK)
      - BBC Audio
      - The Penguin Podcast
    - Vintage Publishing UK
      - The Bodley Head
      - Chatto & Windus
      - Harvill Secker
      - Hogarth Press
      - Jonathan Cape
      - Square Peg
  - Penguin Random House Grupo Editorial (Spain/Portugal/Latin America)
    - Aguliar
    - Alfaguara
    - Ediciones B
      - B de Bloke
      - B de Books
      - B de Bolsillo
      - B Comic
    - Ediciones Cliper
      - Cliper+
    - Ediciones Salamandra
    - Companhia das Letras (70%)
    - Editorial Bruguera
    - Editorial Molino
    - Editorial Sudamericana
    - Editorial Grijabo
    - Grupo Santillana
    - Lumen
    - Objetiva
    - Penguin Clasicos
    - Plaza & Janés
    - Random Cómics
    - Suma de Letras
    - Taurus
  - Penguin Random House India
    - Duckbill Books
  - Penguin Random House New Zealand
  - Penguin Random House Struik (South Africa)
  - Transworld Ireland
  - Verlasgsgruppe Penguin Random House (Germany)
    - Anaconda Verlag
    - Ariston
    - Arkana Verlag
    - Bassermann
    - Blanvalet
    - Blessing Verlag
    - Btb Verlag
    - carl's books
    - C. Bertelsmann Verlag
    - Der Audio Verlag
    - der Hörverlag
    - Deutsche Verlag-Anstalt
    - Diana Verlag
    - Diederichs
    - Goldmann
    - Gütersloher Verlagshaus
    - Heyne Publishing
      - Heyne Hardcore
      - Heyne fliegt
    - Luchterhand Literaturverlag
    - Manesse Verlag
    - Pantheon Verlag
    - Penguin JUNIOR
    - Penguin Verlag
    - Penhaligon
    - Prestel Publishing
    - Random House Audio (Germany)
    - Reimann Verlag
    - Siedler Verlag
    - Südwest-Verlag
    - Wunderraum
    - Yuna Publishing
- Penguin Young Readers Group
  - Dial Books for Young Readers
  - Dutton Children's Books
  - Firebird Books
  - Frederick Warne & Co.
  - G. P. Putnam's Sons Books for Young Readers
  - Grosset & Dunlap
    - Charter Books (Ace Charter)
    - Bedtime Stories
    - Junior Library
    - Platt & Mutt
  - Kathy Dawson Books
  - Koklia
  - Ladybird Books
  - Nancy Paulsen Books
  - Penguin Workshop
  - Philomel Books
  - Price Stern Sloan
  - Puffin Books
  - Razorbill
  - Viking Children's Books
- Random House
  - Crown Publishing Group
    - Amphoto Books
    - Broadway Books
    - Clarkson Potter
    - Convergent Books
    - Crown
    - Crown Archetype
    - Crown Forum
    - Currency
    - Harmony Books
    - Hogarth Press
    - Image Catholic Books
    - Multnomah
    - Random House Books USA
    - Rodale Books
    - Ten Speed Press
      - Lorena Jones Books
      - Watson-Guptill
    - Three Rivers Press
    - Tim Duggan Books
    - WaterBrook
    - Multnomah
  - Random House Publishing Group
    - Ballantine Books
      - Del Rey Books
        - LucasBooks
    - Bantam Books
      - Bantam Press
      - Spectra
    - Dell Publishing
      - Dial Press
    - Loveswept & Flirt
    - Modern Library
    - One World
    - Spiegel & Grau
    - SPJ For Horgath
  - Random House Children's Books
    - Alfred A. Knopf Books for Young Readers
    - Anne Schwartz Books
    - Skylark
    - Bluefire
    - Crown Books for Young Readers
    - Doubleday Children's Books
    - Delacorte Press
    - Dragonfly Books
    - Ember
    - Golden Books
    - Laurel-Leaf Books
    - Lee Wade
    - Little Tiger Press
    - The Princeton Review
    - Random House Books for Young Readers
    - Sylvan Learning
    - Wendy Lamb Books
    - Yearling Books

== BMG ==
=== Music publishers ===
- Bug Music
- Crosstown Songs
- Cherry Lane Music Publishing
- Chrysalis Music Group
- Stage Three Music
- Evergreen Copyrights
- Famous Music UK
- R2M
- Sony/ATV Music Publishing (Select songwriters)
- Virgin Music

=== Labels ===
- 50/50 Global Muzik Inc and 50/50 Global EDM
- Albert Music
- Broken Bow Records
- Disques Dreyfus
- Double U Records (Founded by Jacob Whitesides)
- Dutchess Music (Founded by Fergie)
- The Echo Label
- The End Records
- Hal David
- Infectious Records
- Mute Records
- Noise Records
- Neon Nation Corporation
- Paracadute (Founded by OK GO)
- RAM Records
- Rise Records
- Rhythm Nation (Founded by Janet Jackson)
- S-Curve Records
- Sanctuary Records
- Sedona Recording Company
- Skint Records
- Strictly Rhythm
- Vagrant Records
- Victory Records
- Verse Music Group
- ZTT Records

== Former assets ==
=== Divested ===
- BMG Interactive - sold to Take-Two Interactive in 2000
- Channel 5 Broadcasting Limited - sold to Northern & Shell in 2010
- FremantleMedia Kids & Family – sold to Boat Rocker Media in 2018
- Ludia - sold to Jam City in 2021
- REN TV
- RTL 7 - sold to TVN Group in 2002
- RTL-TVI
- Club RTL
- Plug RTL
- Universum Film GmbH - sold to Leonine Holding in 2019

=== Dormant or shuttered ===
- Boundless (United Kingdom) - merged with Naked in 2020
- Blue Rider Press
- EVA Entertainment
- Fontaram Productions (France)
- Hare & Tortoise (United Kingdom)
- Newman Street (United Kingdom)
- Razorbill - folded into Putnum Children's Books

== See also ==
- Lists of corporate assets
