= RTL International =

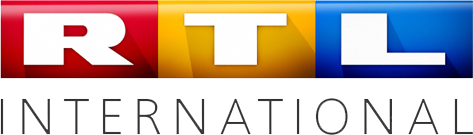
- Country: Germany
- Broadcast area: Worldwide
- Network: Mediengruppe RTL Deutschland
- Headquarters: Cologne, Germany

Programming
- Language: German
- Picture format: 576i (16:9 SDTV)

Ownership
- Owner: RTL Group
- Sister channels: RTL Television; RTL Zwei; Nitro; RTLup; Super RTL; VOX n-tv

History
- Launched: 18 January 2016; 10 years ago

Links
- Website: www.rtl-international.de

RTL International was a German-speaking pay-TV channel of RTL Group targeted the global community of German-speaking viewers and tourists with selected programmes from domestic TV channels RTL Television, VOX, RTL Nitro and n-tv. The channel broadcast in non-European countries from January 18, 2016, to May 31, 2017. RTL International replaced RTL Television's previous offer in Southern Africa and Israel and also broadcast for the first time in Australia, Georgia, Canada and the USA.

RTL Group announced on 15 February 2017 that the broadcasting operation will be discontinued as of 31 May 2017. RTL stated that piracy of its content through streaming platforms such as Kodi was to blame, though it had also been offered in extra-cost "German tiers" of some pay-TV providers alone, pricing out viewers from its content.

== Distribution ==
Among the following pay-TV providers, RTL International was available as of November 2016:

- Bell Satellite TV - Canada
- Caucasus Online – Georgia
- Charter Communications – United States
- Deukom – Botswana, Mozambique, Seychelles und South Africa
- flip TV – Australia
- HOT – Israel
- Satelio – Ghana, Kenya, Namibia, Nigeria, Seychelles und Togo
- Silknet – Georgia
- Telus TV - Canada
- Yes – Israel
