= RTL II You =

- Country: Germany
- Broadcast area: Germany
- Affiliates: RTL II
- Headquarters: Grünwald, Germany

Programming
- Language: German

Ownership
- Owner: RTL Group
- Sister channels: RTL Television; RTL II; RTL Nitro; RTLplus; Super RTL; VOX n-tv

History
- Launched: 31 May 2016; 10 years ago
- Closed: 30 June 2017; 9 years ago

Links
- Website: you.rtl2.de

RTL II You was an online channel and on-demand feature of the German TV channel RTL II. It was particularly a younger target group to be addressed. The program started on 31 May 2016. In addition to exclusive productions, anime and US productions were also aired. On RTL II You the news format RTL II News as well as the weather of RTL II were broadcast. RTL II You also worked with some YouTube stars and channels, whose content was also added to the channel.

The channel was accessible via the subdomain you.rtl2.de, where the livestreaming and on-demand offers were available, as well as via an app for devices for Android and iOS. RTL II You was discontinued as of 30 June 2017, as the establishment of the brand fell short of expectations. Formats that run on RTL II You are now to be integrated into the program of RTL II.

== Programming ==
=== Anime ===
- Digimon Fusion
- Dragon Ball
- One Piece
- Is It Wrong to Try to Pick Up Girls in a Dungeon? (DanMachi)
- Pokémon
- Sailor Moon
- The Devil Is a Part-Timer!
- Wish Upon the Pleiades
- Yu-Gi-Oh! Zexal

=== Scripted Reality ===
- Berlin – Tag & Nacht
- Köln 50667
- Next, Please!
- X-Diaries
