= Chris Tomic =

German scientist (born 1978)

Chris Tomic (born 1978) is a German computer scientist, inventor, entrepreneur and a reality TV personality. He has featured in several television shows, mostly on the German news channel N-TV Television.

== Life ==
After his studies in Germany at the Heinrich-Heine-Universität Düsseldorf, he started developing technologies for the internet and mobile industry in Düsseldorf with the company Novadoc GmbH until 2001.

Tomic created the UCP protocol and set the standard for the worldwide first delivery of binary messages to mobile handsets such as operator-logos and monophonic ringtones in 1998. As executive director of the company Novadoc GmbH he focused his research and development on secure mobile payments and micropayments over SMS (Mobile Payments). In 2001 he became the CTO of the company MonsterMob LTD in the UK.

== Development of the company Monstermob LTD ==
In 2003 MonsterMob LTD was floated on the London Stock Exchange with an opening market capitalisation of £32m. Spanish internet firm LaNetro Zed bought up a majority 53% stake in the business.

The agreement will mean LaNetro Zed and MonsterMob LTD will together become the world's largest company in the Mobile Value-Added Services (MVAS) market in terms of revenue. The enlarged company is now operating in 31 countries around the world employing 1,200 staff.

== Filmography ==
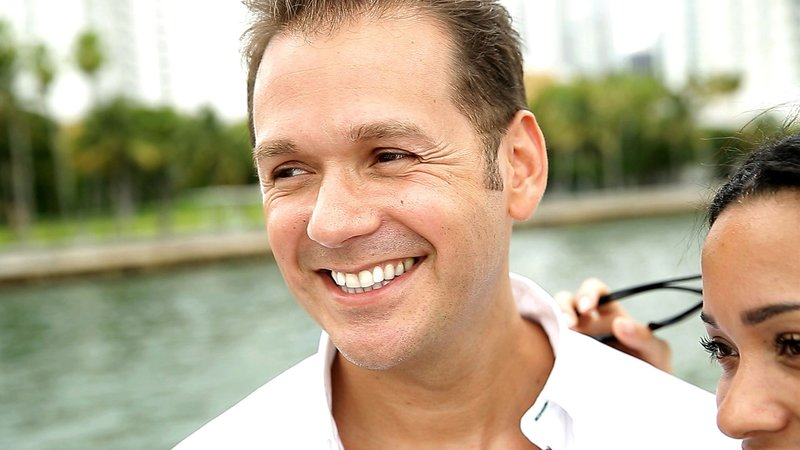
Chris Tomic at "Ferien mit den Superreichen" (RTL Television) 2015

Film and television
Year	Title	Role	Notes
2007	Deluxe - Alles, was Spaß macht: Selfmade-Millionär	Himself	Documentary on N-TV Television
2011	Daniela Katzenberger – natürlich blond	Himself	Reality television on VOX
2012	Chris Tomic - Celebrity Birthday Night	Himself	Music Video on FashionTV
2012	FashionTV meets FHM Sweden	Himself	Documentary on FashionTV
2013	Männerträume: Die Top 10	Himself	Documentary mini-series on N-TV Television
2013	Deluxe - Alles, was Spaß macht: Art Basel Miami Beach	Himself	Documentary on N-TV Television
2013	Deluxe - Alles, was Spaß macht: Auto Tuning Miami Style	Himself	Documentary on N-TV Television
2014	Deluxe - Alles, was Spaß macht: Campus für Nachwuchs-Millionäre	Himself	Documentary on N-TV Television
2014	Deluxe - Alles, was Spaß macht: Ein Millionär und seine Hightech-Luxusvilla	Himself	Documentary on N-TV Television
2015	Ferien mit den Superreichen	Himself	Reality television on RTL Television
