= Laura Papendick =

German television presenter and journalist

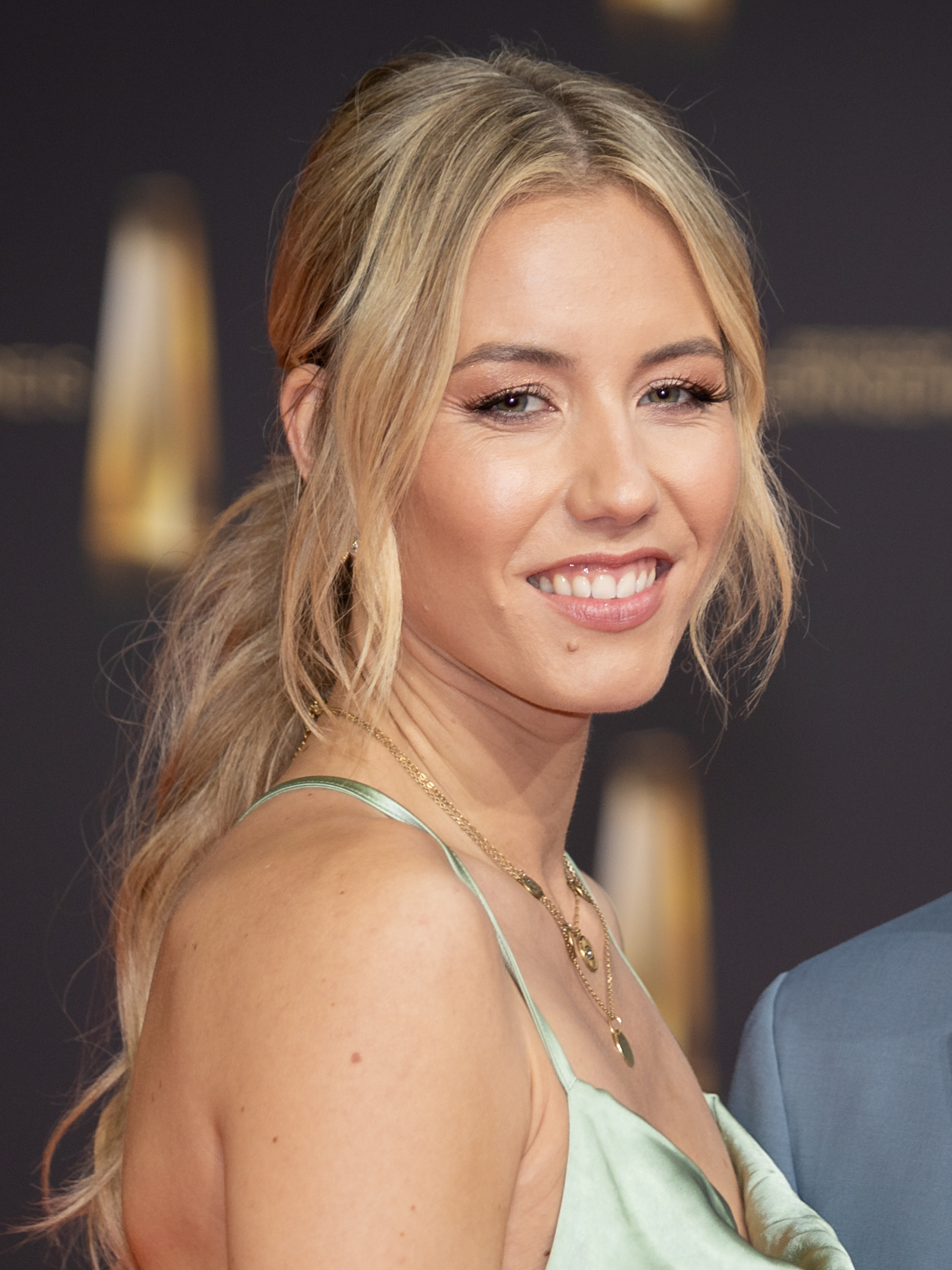
- Papendick in 2022
- Born: 21 January 1989 (age 37); Bergisch Gladbach, Germany
- Occupations: Television presenter, journalist
- Notable credit(s): Sport1 (2019–2021); RTL Group (2021–present)

Laura Papendick (born 21 January 1989) is a German television presenter and journalist.

== Early life and education ==
Laura Papendick was born in Bergisch Gladbach and studied sports journalism in Cologne. She gained her first experience as a reporter and editor for DFL Digital Sports GmbH, a subsidiary of the DFL Deutsche Fußball Liga, which is responsible for its digital content.

Papendick was a competitive swimmer in her youth and qualified for the German Championships. She cites Franziska van Almsick as a sports role model.

== Television career ==
Papendick worked as a presenter for the Bundesliga football club Bayer 04 Leverkusen on the club channel Bayer 04-TV. From 2015, she worked as a reporter for Sky Deutschland. In 2016, she joined the presenting team of Sky Sport News. Her performance there earned her a nomination for the German Sports Journalist Award in the Newcomer category in 2017. She was ranked second after Marco Hagemann.

In 2019, Papendick joined the Sport1 presenting team. She hosted the programs Bundesliga aktuell and Bundesliga Pur, and co-hosted Doppelpass, alternating with Jochen Stutzky and Ruth Hofmann. She also hosted the program Fantalk, alternating with Thomas Helmer. She also hosted the program Sport1 News.

Papendick joined the RTL Group in May 2021. For the channels RTL and Nitro, she became a presenter for the UEFA Europa League and Formula One.

== Private life ==
Until the beginning of 2021, she was in a relationship with television sports presenter and commentator Olivier Zwartyes. Since August 2021, she has been in a relationship with television actor and reality TV contestant Alexander Hindersmann. They only publicly announced their relationship on their first anniversary. In early February 2023, she announced her first pregnancy. In June 2023, they became parents of a son.
