= Top Girl =

Top Girl may refer to:

- Top Girls, play by Caryl Churchill
- Top Girls Fassa Bortolo
- Top Girl (film) (it:Top Girl) 1996 redirects to Joe D'Amato
- Top Girl (magazine) redirects to List of assets owned by Bertelsmann
- Top Girl (TV series) redirects to Top Girl – Georgia's Next Top Model
- Top Girl (game) redirects to CrowdStar
- Top Girl (Gina Choi EP)
- "Top Girl", Korean-language song from Top Girl (Gina Choi EP)
