= TOP gogo season 1 =

TOP gogo
- Season 1
- The Contestants of TOP gogo, season 1
- Presented by: Dima Chikvaidze
- Judges: Salome Gviniashvili; Oksana Popkova
- No. of episodes: 16

Release
- Original network: Rustavi 2
- Original release: May 13 – October 22, 2012

Season chronology
- Next → Season 2

The first season of TOP gogo premiered on May 13, 2012 and featured 13 contestants. The show began to air in May. However, after the competition was down to the last three contestants, the show took a temporary break and stopped airing. The finale aired some months later in October where the progress and final adventures of the top 3 in London was shown. Twenty-two-year-old Tako Mandaria was declared the winner of the competition. She would later on go to sue the producers of the show because she did not receive all of her prizes.

== Contestants ==
(ages stated are at start of contest)

Contestant	Age	Height	Finish	Place
Mariam Mosashvili	20	1.70 m (5 ft 7 in)	Episode 2	13
Tamo Ivanidze	23	1.72 m (5 ft 7 1/2 in)	Episode 3	12
Tatia Okropiridze	21	1.74 m (5 ft 8 1/2 in)	Episode 4	11
Sopo Chakvetadze	22	1.80 m (5 ft 11 in)	Episode 5	10 (DQ)
Liza Romanovskaya	19	1.73 m (5 ft 8 in)	Episode 6	9 (Quit)
Salome Gogiberidze	22	1.75 m (5 ft 9 in)	Episode 7	8
Renata Begiashvili	19	1.83 m (6 ft 0 in)	Episode 8	7
Guranda Tsertsvadze	21	1.74 m (5 ft 8 1/2 in)	Episode 11	6
Naniko Genebashvili	19	1.75 m (5 ft 9 in)	Episode 12	5
Keti Tatuashvili	20	1.70 m (5 ft 7 in)	Episode 14	4
Sopo Tsikoridze	17	1.74 m (5 ft 8 1/2 in)	Episode 16	3-2
Nino Lomtadze	23	1.70 m (5 ft 7 in)	Episode 16	3-2
Tako Mandaria	22	1.75 m (5 ft 9 in)	Episode 16	1

== Summaries ==
=== Call-out order ===
Salome's Call-out Order
Thứ tự	Tập									
Thứ tự	2	3	4	6	7	8	11	12	14	16
1	Keti	Nino	Keti	Tako	Naniko	Guranda	Keti	Tako	Sopo T.	Tako
2	Guranda	Renata	Liza	Keti	Sopo T.	Naniko	Tako	Sopo T.	Tako	Nino; Sopo T.
3	Sopo T.	Naniko	Nino	Sopo T.	Tako	Keti	Nino	Nino	Nino	Nino; Sopo T.
4	Sopo C.	Tatia	Salome	Nino	Guranda	Nino	Sopo T.	Keti	Keti	
5	Salome	Liza	Renata	Guranda	Nino	Sopo T.	Naniko	Naniko		
6	Tatia	Guranda	Naniko	Salome	Renata	Tako	Guranda			
7	Renata	Sopo T.	Tako	Naniko; Renata	Keti	Renata				
8	Liza	Keti	Sopo C.	Naniko; Renata	Salome					
9	Tako	Sopo C.	Sopo T.	Liza						
10	Nino	Salome	Guranda	Sopo C.						
11	Tamo	Tako	Tatia							
12	Naniko	Tamo								
13	Mariam									

The contestant was eliminated
The contestant was disqualified
The contestant was part of a non-elimination bottom two
The contestant quit the competition
The contestant won the competition

- Episode 1 was the casting episode. The pool of 30 semi-finalists was narrowed down to the final 13.
- In episode 5, Sopo C. was disqualified for contacting her boyfriend via the Internet, which was against the show's rules.
- In episode 6, Naniko and Renata landed in the bottom two. Neither of them was eliminated due to Liza's decision to withdraw from the show.
- In episodes 5, 9, 10, 13 and 15 there were no eliminations, and all the contestants were put through collectively to the next episode.

=== Photo shoot guide ===
- Episode 2 photo shoot: AVTANDIL dresses
- Episode 3 photo shoot: Natural beauty shots
- Episode 4 photo shoot: Avant-garde on the street of Alexander Kazbegi Avenue; Posing at the traffic light
- Episode 5 photo shoot: Posing in Erke sports shop
- Episode 6 photo shoot: Neanderthal hunters
- Episode 7 photo shoot: Queen Jewelry campaign
- Episode 8 photo shoot: Replay denim campaign
- Episode 9 photo shoot: Posing nude with snakes and flowers
- Episode 11 photo shoot: Iverioni calendar editorial
- Episode 12 photo shoot: Posing underwater
- Episode 13 photo shoot: B&W on an old fishing vessel
- Episode 14 photo shoot: Gothic style
- Episode 15 photo shoot: Professional modeling test shots
