= RTL Living =

- Country: Germany
- Broadcast area: Germany; Austria; Switzerland
- Headquarters: Cologne, Germany

Programming
- Language: German
- Picture format: 1080i HDTV (downscaled to 16:9 576i for the SDTV feed)

Ownership
- Owner: RTL Group
- Parent: RTL Deutschland
- Sister channels: RTL; VOX n-tv Super RTL; RTL Zwei; Nitro; RTLup; VOXup; RTL Crime; RTL Passion; GEO Television

History
- Launched: 1 December 2006

Links
- Website: www.rtl-living.de

RTL Living is a German pay television channel operated by the RTL Group, launched on 1 December 2006. Its programming consists of television shows about trends, lifestyle, life and travel. On October 1, 2015, RTL Group announced that it was relaunching and redesigning its three pay TV channels RTL Living, RTL Crime and Passion (then RTL Passion) as of November 12, 2015. At the same time, new channel logos will also be introduced for these channels.

As part of Mediengruppe RTL Deutschland’s rebranding effort, RTL Living was rebranded along with RTL Passion and the parent channel RTL on 15 September 2021, by becoming a multi-colourful logo instead of green, pink and the three colours: red, yellow and blue from the parent channel.

== Logos ==
12 September 2007 - 11 November 2015

12 November 2015 - 14 September 2021

12 November 2015 - 14 September 2021

since 15 September 2021

== Audience share ==
=== Germany ===
	January	February	March	April	May	June	July	August	September	October	November	December	Annual average
2016	-	-	-	-	-	-	-	-	-	-	0.0%	0.0%	0.0%
2017	0.0%	0.0%	0.0%	0.0%	0.0%	0.0%	0.0%	0.0%	0.0%	0.0%	0.0%	0.0%	0.0%
2018													
