= RTL Crime (German TV channel) =

- Country: Germany
- Broadcast area: Germany; Austria; Switzerland
- Network: RTL Deutschland
- Headquarters: Cologne, Germany

Programming
- Languages: German, English
- Picture format: 1080i HDTV (downscaled to 16:9 576i for the SDTV feed)

Ownership
- Owner: RTL Group
- Parent: RTL Deutschland
- Sister channels: RTL; VOX n-tv Super RTL; RTL Zwei; Nitro; RTLup; VOXup; RTL Living; RTL Passion; GEO Television

History
- Launched: 1 December 2006; 19 years ago

Links
- Website: www.rtl-crime.de

RTL Crime (stylized as RTL CRIME since 15 September 2021) is a German pay television channel owned by the RTL Group. The channel was launched on 1 December 2006. Its programming is centred towards action and crime series.

== Distribution ==
Since 1 October 2007, RTL Crime was launched on Sky Deutschland. On 1 September 2011, a localised feed of the channel was launched in the Netherlands.

On 15 May 2012, the channel launched its own high-definition simulcast feed, which started to be carried on Unitymedia. On 25 September 2014, RTL Crime HD was launched on Sky Deutschland.

Since 1 August 2017, the channel is also available in HD at Kabel Deutschland in the "HD Premium" package.

== Programming ==
- Abschnitt 40 (2011-2014)
- Agents of S.H.I.E.L.D. (Marvel's Agents of S.H.I.E.L.D.) (2014–present)
- Altes Geld (2016-2018)
- American Gods (2018–present)
- Arrow (2014–present)
- Ash vs Evil Dead (2016–present)
- Autopsy (Autopsie - Mysteriöse Todesfälle) (2009–present)
- Balko (2006-2011, 2015–2016)
- Black Mirror (2013–present)
- Born to Kill? (Born to Kill - Als Mörder geboren?) (2008–present)
- Born to Kill?: Class of Evil (Born to Kill - A Class of Evil) (2017)
- Breakout Kings (2012–present)
- Cagney & Lacey (2016–2018)
- Cold Justice: Sex Crimes (2017)
- Crimes of the Century (Ridley Scott: Crimes of the Century) (2014–present)
- Crossbones (Crossbones - Im Reich der Piraten) (2015–present)
- CSI: Cyber (2015–present)
- Death Row Stories (Death Row Stories: Geschichten aus dem Todestrakt) (2016–present)
- CSI: Cyber (2015–present)
- Deutschland 83 (2018–present)
- Dirk Gently (2012-2015)
- Forensic Files (Medical Detectives – Geheimnisse der Gerichtsmedizin) (2006-2010, 2012–present)
- From Dusk till Dawn: The Series (From Dusk Till Dawn - Die Serie) (2016–present)
- F/X: The Series (F/X - Die Serie) (2009-2011, 2013)
- Guyane (Gier - Rausch des Goldes/Ouro) (2017–present)
- Hit & Miss (2013-2016)
- Hostages (Die Geiseln/Bnei Aruba) (2017–present)
- Humans (2016–present)
- Killers: Behind the Myth (Mythos Serienkiller) (2015–present)
- King (2013–2018)
- Kojak (2005) (2007–2009)
- Liar (2018–present)
- Meadowlands (Meadowlands - Stadt der Angst) (2009-2012)
- Mörder (2015–present)
- Mr. Robot (2017–present)
- Profiler (2016–present)
- Ransom (2017–present)
- Rillington Place (Rillington Place - Der Böse) (2017–present)
- Ripper Street (2013–present)
- Russian Dolls: Sex Trade (Matrioshki - Mädchenhändler) (2009-2015)
- SK-Babies (2007-2008)
- SS-GB (2017–present)
- Stieg Larsson: Millennium (2016–present)
- The Bureau (Büro der Legenden/Le Bureau des Légendes) (2017)
- The Grid (The Grid - Netz des Terrors) (2007-2008, 2010)
- Utopia (2014–present)
- Vier Frauen und ein Todesfall (2008-2012, 2014–present)
- White Collar (2012-2017)

== Audience share ==
=== Germany ===
	January	February	March	April	May	June	July	August	September	October	November	December	Annual average
2016	-	-	-	-	-	-	-	-	-	-	0.1%	0.1%	0.1%
2017	0.1%	0.1%	0.1%	0.2%	0.2%	0.2%	0.2%	0.2%	0.1%	0.1%	0.1%	0.1%	0.1%
2018	0.1%	0.1%	0.1%	0.1%	0.1%	0.1%	-	-	-	-	-	-	
2019	0,1%	0,1%	0,1%	0,1%	0,1%	0,1%	0,1%	0,1%	0,1%	0,1%	0,1%	0,1%	0,1%
2020	0,1%	0,1%	0,1%	0,1%	0,1%	0,1%	0,1%	0,1%	0,1%	0,1%	0,1%	0,0%	0,1%
2021	0,1%	0,1%	0,1%	0,1%	0,1%	0,1%	0,1%	0,1%	0,1%	0,1%	0,1%	0,0%	0,1%
2022	0,1%	0,1%	0,1%	0,1%	0,1%	0,1%	0,1%	0,1%	0,1%	0,1%	0,1%		

== Logos ==
November 12, 2015 – September 14, 2021

September 14, 2021 – present

September 14, 2021 – present (alternative logo)
