= RTL Passion =

- Country: Germany
- Headquarters: Cologne, Germany

Programming
- Picture format: 1080i HDTV (downscaled to 16:9 576i for the SDTV feed)

Ownership
- Owner: RTL Group; GrundyUFA TV Produktions GmbH
- Parent: RTL Deutschland
- Sister channels: RTL; VOX n-tv Super RTL; RTL Zwei; Nitro; RTLup; VOXup; RTL Crime; RTL Living; GEO Television

History
- Launched: 1 December 2006
- Former names: Passion (2006–2015)

Links
- Website: rtl-passion.de

RTL Passion (stylized as RTL PASSION) is a German pay television channel launched on 1 December 2006 and owned by RTL Group and Grundy UFA TV Produktions GmbH. Its programming is focused on female audiences with soap operas, telenovelas and television dramas.

The channel gained a new logo and graphics package on 11 November 2015. The new logo is square-less, and different from the Croatian version.

The logo was changed again on 15 September 2021, along with the other sister channels, RTL Living and the main parent channel RTL.

== Programming ==
=== Current programming ===
- A.D. The Bible Continues (A.D.: Rebellen und Märtyrer) (2016-2017)
- Alles was zählt (All That Counts) (2008–present)
- Arctic Air (2015)
- Atlantis (2014–present)
- Arvingerne (Die Erbschaft) (2017–present)
- Azul (Azul - Paradies in Gefahr) (2007-2010)
- Christine. Perfekt war gestern! (Christine. Perfect Was Yesterday!) (2017–present)
- Club der roten Bänder (Club Of The Red Belts) (2016–present)
- D'Artagnan et les Trois Mousquetaires (2005) (Die drei Musketiere) (2011–2012)
- Dawson's Creek (2016–present)
- Der Lehrer (The Teacher) (2017–present)
- Doc meets Dorf (Doc Meets Village)(2017–present)
- Downton Abbey (2018–present)
- Dynasty (Der Denver-Clan) (2012-2014)
- Falcon Crest (2008-2009, 2013-2014)
- Glee (2012–present)
- Gute Zeiten, schlechte Zeiten (Good Times, Bad Times) (2006–present)
- Heartless (2018–present)
- Hotel (2011-2013)
- Jamaica Inn (Riff-Piraten) (2015–present)
- Matchball (2008)
- Mercy (2013-2015)
- Mistresses (2016–present)
- Party of Five (2016–present)
- Providence (2016–present)
- Once Upon a Time (Once Upon a Time - Es war einmal...) (2012–present)
- Outlander (Outlander - Die Highland-Saga) (2015–present)
- Rosa salvaje (Die wilde Rose) (2008, 2010-2011)
- Royal Pains (2014-2017)
- Salomé (2008-2011)
- Secret Diary of a Call Girl (Secret Diary of a Call Girl - Geständnisse einer Edelhure) (2009-2013)
- Sekretärinnen - Überleben von 9 bis 5 (Secretaries - Survive From 9 To 5) (2017–present)
- Small Island (2014–present)
- Sous le soleil (St. Tropez) (2006-2009)
- Tess of the D'Urbervilles (Tess) (2011-2013)
- The Collection (2017–present)
- The Hollow Crown (2017–present)
- The Paradise (2013–present)
- The Smoke (2014-2017)
- The Starter Wife (The Starter Wife - Alles auf Anfang) (2014–present)
- Thirtysomething (Die besten Jahre) (2016–present)
- Titans (Titans - Dynastie der Intrigen) (2008-2011)
- Unter uns (2006–present)
- Verbotene Liebe (Forbidden Love) (2006–present)
- Vicious (2014-2017)
- War & Peace (Krieg und Frieden) (2017–present)
- Westerdeich (2008-2009)
- Wildfire (2010-2012)
- Your Family or Mine (2018–present)

== Logo ==
16 January 2013 – 11 November 2015

12 November 2015 - 14 September 2021

12 November 2015 - 14 September 2021

since 15 September 2021

== Audience share ==
=== Germany ===
	January	February	March	April	May	June	July	August	September	October	November	December	Annual average
2016	-	-	-	-	-	-	-	-	-	-	0.0%	0.0%	0.0%
2017	0.1%	0.1%	0.1%	0.0%	0.1%	0.1%	0.1%	0.1%	0.1%	0.1%	0.1%	0.1%	0.1%
2018	0.1%	0.1%	0.1%	0.1%	0.1%								
