= Pablo del Molino Mateus =

Spanish book editor

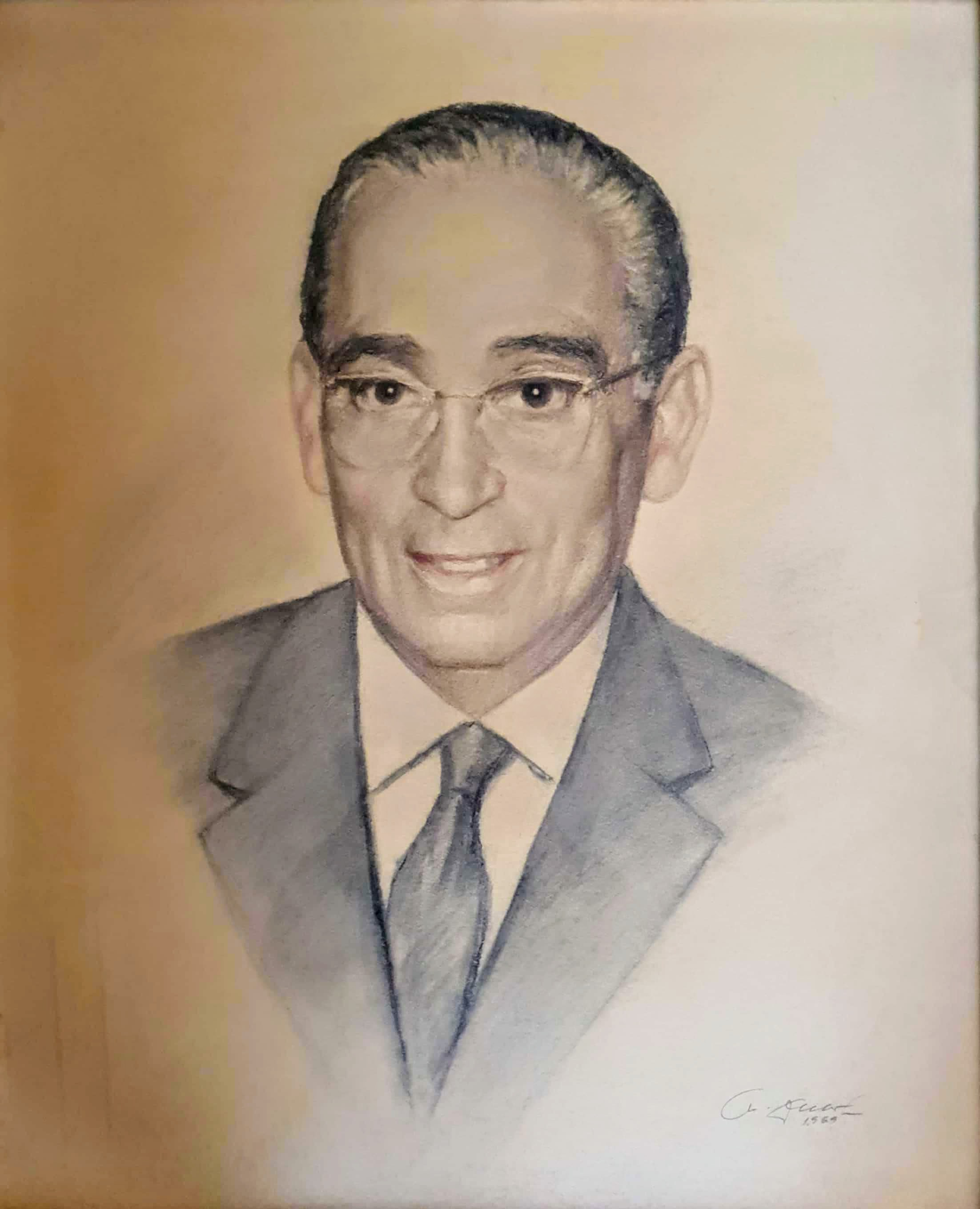
- Born: 24 February 1900; Sequeros, Salamanca, Spain
- Died: 16 April 1968 (aged 68); Barcelona, Spain
- Occupations: Editor; publisher
- Years active: 1933–1968
- Known for: Founder of publishing house Editorial Molino
- Spouse: Maria Sterna
- Children: Maria del Molino Sterna; Ana del Molino Sterna; Pablo del Molino Sterna

Pablo del Molino Mateus (Sequeros, Salamanca, Spain, February 24, 1900 - Barcelona, Catalonia, Spain, April 16, 1968) was a Spanish book editor. He founded the Editorial Molino in Barcelona in 1933 with the vision of creating a collection of novels accessible to the general public.

== Biography ==
He was born in the town of Sequeros, Salamanca, Spain in 1900. He was the son of Pablo del Molino Martín (Cartagena, Spain), a property registrar, and Concepción Mateus Massana (Valladolid, Spain). Concepción Mateus inherited in 1923 from her cousin Agustí Massana i Pujol, whose important legacies led to the founding of the Escola Massana. Julio Gibert Mateus founder, among other companies, of El hogar y la moda (Home and Fashion), proposed to his cousin Concepción Mateus to invest part of the inheritance received from Agustín Massana in shares of a publishing house that he promoted, the Editorial Juventud. In this way, Concepción Mateus and her son Pablo del Molino Mateus became part of the company's board of directors, led by José Zendrera. In 1930 Pablo del Molino was appointed deputy director of Editorial Juventud. In 1932 Concepción Mateus transferred his shares to Pablo del Molino. Editorial Juventud promoted at that time the collection La Novela Rosa, dedicated to sentimental and traditional narratives.

In 1933, Pablo del Molino resigned as deputy director of Editorial Juventud to found Editorial Molino. Pablo del Molino favored publishing a type of crime and adventure novel from the English-speaking world, compared to the editorial line of Editorial Juventud, more focused on French and German authors, of adventures aimed at a young audience. Pablo maintained his position on the board of directors and shares of Editorial Juventud until 1939. The two publishers agreed on bases for future cooperation, in which Editorial Juventud provided financial access and distribution facilities to the emerging Editorial Molino. Editorial Molino published its first title of Biblioteca Oro (Serie Azul) on November 10, 1933. Pablo had the collaboration of the youngest of his brother, Luis del Molino Mateus (Aranda de Duero 1907-1990), who set up the administration of the publishing house in rented premises at 245 Urgell Street.

The Spanish Civil War paralyzed the magazine and all the new projects. Pablo del Molino decided to emigrate to Argentina in 1937 to continue giving continuity to the publishing house. The publishing house settled at 1022 Migueletes street in Buenos Aires, where it had its own graphic workshops. In Argentina, the publishing house prospered and continued with popular novel publications, starting the publication of the predecessor of the comic book, known as Pulp Magazines in the United States, and in Spain as Hombres Audaces (Doc Savage, Bill Barnes, Pete Rice, etc.). Meanwhile, his brother Luis del Molino Mateus, who in 1947 would become a partner of the publishing house with 45% of its capital, continued to lead the Barcelona publishing house.

In 1952 Pablo del Molino decided to return to Spain and liquidate his facilities in Buenos Aires, due to the difficult political and labor situation in Argentina. The publisher renewed the presentation of many collections, especially the Biblioteca Oro, and the publication of Selecciones de Biblioteca Oro began, among which Agatha Christie stood out.

He died in 1968 and was succeeded by his son Pablo del Molino Sterna (1937-2000), who had already worked at the publishing house since his return from Argentina in 1953 and had acquired a wide experience.
