= Geo Television (Germany) =

- Country: Germany
- Broadcast area: Germany, Austria
- Headquarters: Cologne, Germany

Programming
- Language: German
- Picture format: 576i (16:9 SDTV); 1080i (HDTV)

Ownership
- Owner: RTL Group
- Parent: RTL Deutschland
- Sister channels: RTL; VOX n-tv Super RTL; RTL Zwei; Nitro; RTLup; VOXup; RTL Crime; RTL Living; RTL Passion

History
- Launched: 8 May 2014; 12 years ago

Links
- Website: www.geo-television.de

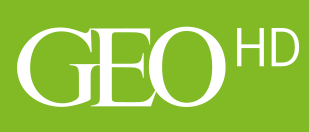
Logo of the HD version

Geo Television is a German-language pay-TV station of the RTL Group. It is the TV offshoot of the magazine with the same name (GEO). Geo Television focuses on reports and documentaries.

== Broadcasting ==
The channel started on 8 May 2014 and was initially only distributed by Telekom Entertain, an IPTV service. Geo Television has also been available on Vodafone Deutschland since 17 May 2017 and on Amazon Prime Video since 23 May 2017.

== Programming ==
- 1 ("1" - Leben am Limit) (2015–present)
- A Lego Brickumentary (2016–present)
- BBC Wildlife Specials (2014–present)
- Citizenfour (2016–present)
- Comic-Con Episode IV: A Fan's Hope (Comic Con - Hinter den Kulissen) (2014–present)
- Dancer (2017–present)
- David Attenborough's First Life (Der Ursprung des Lebens) (2014–present)
- David Attenborough's Natural Curiosities (2014–present)
- De Nieuwe Wildernis (Die neue Wildnis) (2016–present)
- Frozen Planet (Eisige Welten) (2014–present)
- Galapagos 3D (2014–present)
- Genius of the Ancient World (Genies der Antike) (2017–present)
- Genius of the Modern World (Genies der Moderne) (2017–present)
- Ghosts of the Abyss (Die Geister der Titanic) (2015–present)
- Great Barrier Reef (2012) (2016–present)
- Great Barrier Reef (2015) (David Attenboroughs Great Barrier Reef) (2017–present)
- Hillsborough (Hillsborough - Die wahre Geschichte) (2017–present)
- Human (2016–present)
- Inside Job (2014–present)
- Janis: Little Girl Blue (2017–present)
- Life (Faszinierende Wildnis) (2016–present)
- Listen to Me Marlon (2016–present)
- Man on Wire (Man on Wire - Der Drahtseilakt) (2016–present)
- Monkey Planet (Affenwelten) (2015–present)
- Mountain Gorilla (Der Berggorilla) (2014–present)
- Nature's Microworlds (Kleine Paradiese) (2014–present)
- O.J.: Made in America (O.J. Simpson - Eine amerikanische Saga) (2017–present)
- Off the Rails (Ich liebe dich, U-Bahn!) (2017–present)
- Once in a Lifetime: The Extraordinary Story of the New York Cosmos (Fussball vom anderen Stern) (2016–present)
- Planet Earth (2014–present)
- Planet Ocean (2014-2015)
- Project Nim (Das Nim-Experiment) (2015–present)
- Richard Hammond's Invisible Worlds (Richard Hammonds unsichtbare Welten) (2015–present)
- Riding Giants (2016–present)
- Sunshine Superman (2016–present)
- Super Size Me (2017–present)
- That Sugar Film (No Sugar Film - Voll verzuckert) (2016–present)
- The Armstrong Lie (Die Armstrong Lüge) (2015–present)
- The Bear Family & Me (Die Bären-Bande und ich) (2014–present)
- The Blue Planet (2014–present)
- The Polar Bear Family And Me (Unter Eisbären - Überleben in der Arktis) (2014–present)
- The Wolfpack (The Wolfpack: Mitten in Manhattan) (2016–present)
- Tom Meets Zizou (2015–present)
- Trainer! (2015–present)
- Under the Gun (Under the Gun - Waffen in den USA) (2017–present) (by Katie Couric)
- Watermark (2015–present)
- We Steal Secrets: The Story of WikiLeaks (We Steal Secrets: Die WikiLeaks Geschichte) (2016–present)
- Yellowstone (2016–present)
