= TOP gogo season 2 =

TOP gogo
- Season 2
- The Contestants of TOP gogo, season 2
- Presented by: Nino Tskitishvili
- Judges: Nino Tskitishvili; Avtandil Tskvitinidze; Sasha Prishvini
- No. of episodes: 25

Release
- Original network: Rustavi 2
- Original release: January 24 – August 26, 2013

Season chronology
- ← Previous; Season 1

The second season of TOP gogo was hosted by Georgian model Nino Tskitishvili. The judging panel consisted of fashion designer Avtandil Tskvitinidze and photographer Sasha Prishvini. In contrast to the first cycle, the castings were held in countries of the former Soviet Union (Belarus, Latvia, Kazakhstan, Russia and Ukraine respectively). The judges communicated with the contestants in Russian, and this was subtitled in Georgian.

The winner of the competition was 22-year-old Alisa Kuzmina from St. Petersburg, Russia. As her prizes, she received a brand new Mazda car, a one-year supply of eyewear along with beauty salon and clinic services, the opportunity to build a complete and professional modeling portfolio, a cash prize courtesy of VTB, and a twelve-month modeling contract with Das Models Milano in Milan. In addition, she was also given a three-year contract with Look Models in Georgia.

== Contestants ==
(ages stated are at start of contest)

| Contestant | Age | Height | Hometown | Finish | Place |
|---|---|---|---|---|---|
| Mariam Katsadze | 22 | 1.80 m (5 ft 11 in) | Tbilisi, Georgia | Episode 4 | 19 |
| Tatyana 'Tanya' Lauta | 22 | 1.74 m (5 ft 8 1/2 in) | Kyiv, Ukraine | Episode 5 | 18 (quit) |
| Nuki Chikhladze | 24 | 1.70 m (5 ft 7 in) | Tbilisi, Georgia | Episode 6 | 17 |
| Lile Sakhelashvili | 20 | 1.75 m (5 ft 9 in) | Tbilisi, Georgia | Episode 7 | 16 |
| Sofi Tsiskarishvili | 21 | 1.75 m (5 ft 9 in) | Tbilisi, Georgia | Episode 8 | 15 |
| Elene Meladze | 21 | 1.72 m (5 ft 7 1/2 in) | Tbilisi, Georgia | Episode 9 | 14 |
| Maria Yakovenko | 21 | 1.79 m (5 ft 10 1/2 in) | Minsk, Belarus | Episode 11 | 13 |
| Yulia Lutsiva | 22 | 1.75 m (5 ft 9 in) | Kryvyi Rih, Ukraine | Episode 11 | 12 (quit) |
| Maria Naumova | 23 | 1.80 m (5 ft 11 in) | Kyiv, Ukraine | Episode 12 | 11 |
| Lilu Iakobidze | 20 | 1.80 m (5 ft 11 in) | Dedoplistsqaro, Georgia | Episode 14 | 10-9 |
| Elene Imerlishvili | 21 | 1.78 m (5 ft 10 in) | Gori, Georgia | Episode 14 | 10-9 |
| Yulia Mikhailovna | 24 | 1.78 m (5 ft 10 in) | Tyumen, Russia | Episode 16 | 8 |
| Aziza Umerzhanova | 19 | 1.72 m (5 ft 7 1/2 in) | Aktobe, Kazakhstan | Episode 18 | 7 |
| Eka Oqropiridze | 20 | 1.75 m (5 ft 9 in) | Poti, Georgia | Episode 21 | 6 |
| Sako Tsotsoria | 21 | 1.71 m (5 ft 7 1/2 in) | Tbilisi, Georgia | Episode 23 | 5 |
| Evija Vilistere | 24 | 1.85 m (6 ft 1 in) | Riga, Latvia | Episode 24 | 4 |
| Tatako Khurtsilava | 24 | 1.78 m (5 ft 10 in) | Tbilisi, Georgia | Episode 25 | 3-2 |
| Elena Filieva | 22 | 1.70 m (5 ft 7 in) | Tbilisi, Georgia | Episode 25 | 3-2 |
| Alisa Kuzmina | 22 | 1.75 m (5 ft 9 in) | St. Petersburg, Russia | Episode 25 | 1 |

== Summaries ==
=== Call-out order ===
Nino's call-out order
| Order | Episodes | | | | | | | | | | | | | | | | | |
| Order | 3 | 4 | 5 | 6 | 7 | 8 | 9 | 11 | 12 | 13 | 14 | 15 | 16 | 18 | 21 | 23 | 24 | 25 |
|---|---|---|---|---|---|---|---|---|---|---|---|---|---|---|---|---|---|---|
| 1 | Alisa | Yulia L. | Tanya | Elene M. | Sako | Sako | Evija | Elena | Aziza | Elene I. | Tatako | Evija | Tatako | Eka | Tatako | Elena | Alisa | Alisa |
| 2 | Yulia L. | Tatako | Aziza | Yulia L. | Aziza | Yulia L. | Alisa | Maria N. | Elena | Elena | Sako | Tatako | Sako | Tatako | Elena | Tatako | Elena | Elena; Tatako |
| 3 | Sako | Evija | Evija | Evija | Yulia L. | Alisa | Sako | Aziza | Elene I. | Alisa | Aziza | Elena | Evija | Evija | Evija | Alisa | Tatako | Elena; Tatako |
| 4 | Lilu | Sako | Tatako | Lilu | Alisa | Aziza | Maria N. | Tatako | Evija | Tatako | Evija | Eka | Elena | Elena | Alisa | Evija | Evija | |
| 5 | Sofi | Tanya | Alisa | Tatako | Maria Y. | Elena | Tatako | Evija | Lilu | Sako | Elena | Aziza | Eka | Alisa | Sako | Sako | | |
| 6 | Elena | Maria Y. | Elena | Sofi | Tatako | Elene I. | Yulia L. | Sako | Sako | Evija | Alisa | Alisa | Alisa | Sako | Eka | | | |
| 7 | Tatako | Elene I. | Maria Y. | Maria N. | Elene I. | Elene M. | Yulia M. | Elene I. | Tatako | Lilu | Yulia M. | Sako | Aziza | Aziza | | | | |
| 8 | Yulia M. | Sofi | Elene I. | Sako | Maria N. | Evija | Aziza | Yulia M. | Yulia M. | Aziza | Elene I. Lilu | Yulia M. | Yulia M. | | | | | |
| 9 | Tanya | Aziza | Yulia L. | Maria Y. | Yulia M. | Lilu | Elena | Alisa | Alisa | Yulia M. | Elene I. Lilu | | | | | | | |
| 10 | Nuki | Lilu | Lilu | Elene I. | Evija | Maria N. | Maria Y. | Lilu | Maria N. | | | | | | | | | |
| 11 | Maria N. | Maria N. | Sako | Aziza | Elena | Maria Y. | Lilu | Yulia L. | | | | | | | | | | |
| 12 | Evija | Alisa | Sofi | Alisa | Lilu | Tatako | Elene I. | Maria Y. | | | | | | | | | | |
| 13 | Aziza | Elena | Lile | Yulia M. | Elene M. | Yulia M. | Elene M. | | | | | | | | | | | |
| 14 | Elene I. | Lile | Yulia M. | Elena | Sofi | Sofi | | | | | | | | | | | | |
| 15 | Mariam | Nuki | Elene M. | Lile | Lile | | | | | | | | | | | | | |
| 16 | Lile | Yulia M. | Nuki | Nuki | | | | | | | | | | | | | | |
| 17 | Maria Y. | Elene M. | Maria N. | | | | | | | | | | | | | | | |
| 18 | Elene M. | Mariam | | | | | | | | | | | | | | | | |
| 19 | Eka | | | | | | | | | | | | | | | | | |

The contestant was eliminated
The contestant quit the competition
The contestant was put through collectively to the next round
The contestant was the original eliminee but was saved
The contestant was part of a non-elimination bottom two
The contestant won the competition

- In episodes 1,2, 10, 13, 17, 19, 20, and 22 there was no elimination.
- In episode 1, the foreign girls were introduced. Episode 2 focused on the girls from Georgia.
- In episode 5, Tanya decided to withdraw from the competition for personal reasons.
- In episode 6 it was revealed that Maria N, who had been eliminated in the former episode, would remain in the competition due to Tanya's withdrawal.
- In episode 8, only the top two performing girls and the eliminated girl were announced.
- In episode 11, Yulia L quit the competition after the elimination of Maria Y, with whom she was in the bottom three. At the end of the episode, Alisa and Maria N were nominated for elimination by the other contestants.
- In episode 12 the judges only had to decide whom to save between Alisa and Maria N.
- In episode 14, the shoot was replaced by a runway show. The double elimination for the episode was based on the models' performance during the show. Additionally, Eka re-entered the competition.
- In episode 15, Yulia M had originally been eliminated. She was saved due to the double elimination the previous episode.
- The elimination in episode 23 was based upon the girls' performance on the shoot in episode 22.
- The elimination in episode 24 was based on both the girls' performance on the shoot in episode 23 and the new shoot in episode 24.

=== Photo shoot guide ===
- Episode 3 photo shoot: Emotional beauty shots
- Episode 4 photo shoot: Elegant and rich housewives from the 1940s
- Episode 5 photo shoot: Gothic girls in a factory
- Episode 6 photo shoot: Sexy sport women
- Episode 7 photo shoot: Movement editorial
- Episode 8 photo shoot: Traditional Georgian clothing in pairs
- Episode 9 photo shoot: Embodying fashion from the 60s in a hair salon
- Episode 11 photo shoot: Hemophilia beauty shots with jewelry
- Episode 12 photo shoot: Portraying the four seasons
- Episode 13 photo shoot: Posing in lingerie
- Episode 15 photo shoots: Whimsical princesses
- Episode 16 photo shoot: Boats in a lake
- Episode 18 commercial: Campy coffee
- Episode 20 photo shoot: Bikinis in the beach
- Episode 21 photo shoot: Editorial swimwear & beachwear
- Episode 22 photo shoots: Swimming pool love triangle; floating with fabric in a pool
- Episode 23 photo shoots: Lenses beauty shots; sexy car washing hoes
- Episode 24 photo shoot: Luggage advertisements
