= Editorial Molino =

Publishing house in Barcelona, Spain

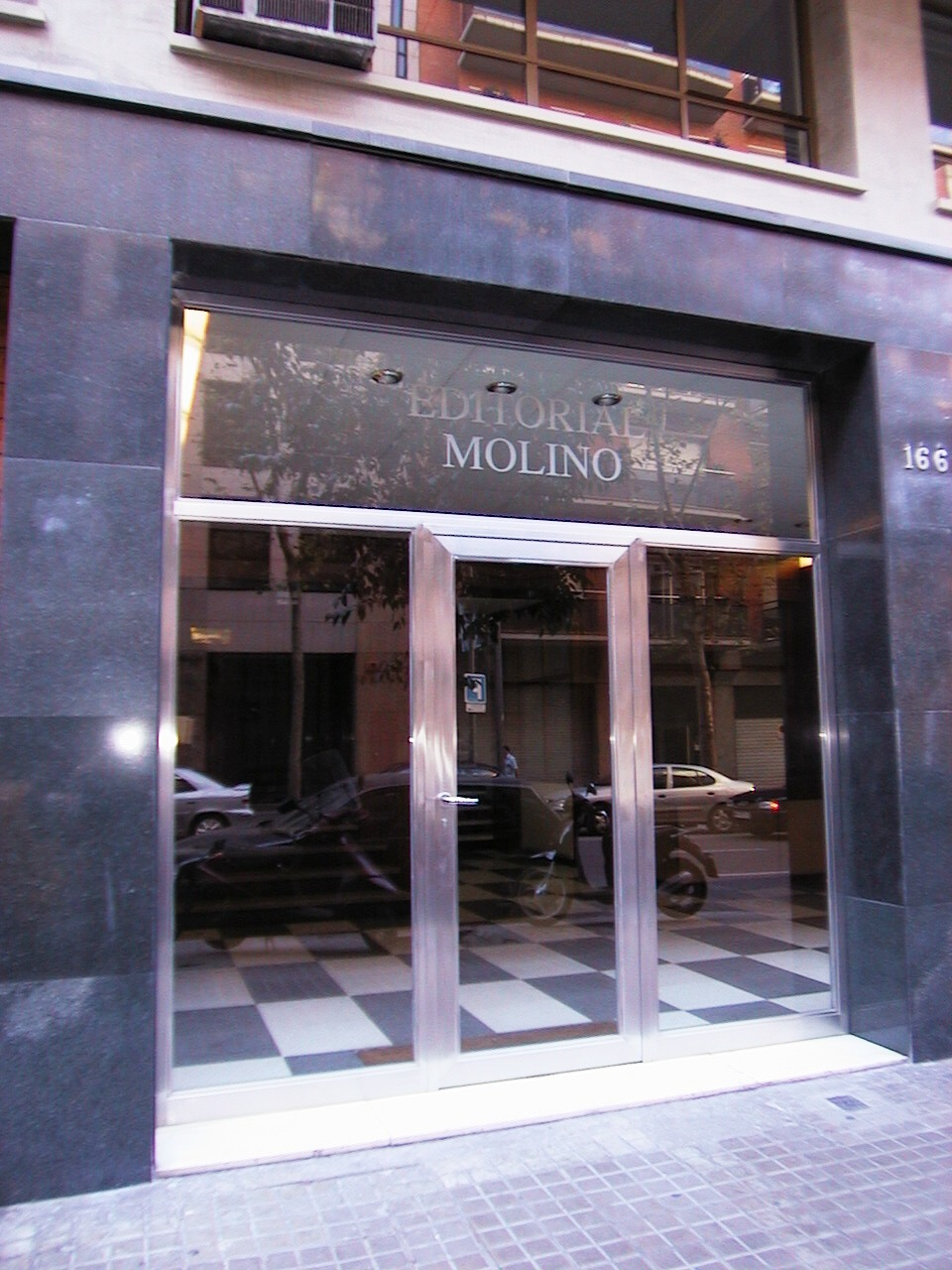
The main entrance of Editorial Molino headquarters in Carrer Calabria 166, Barcelona, Spain.

Editorial Molino was a publishing house created in Barcelona (Catalonia, Spain) in 1933 at the initiative of Pablo del Molino Mateus (1900-1968), with the vision of creating a collection of novels accessible to the general public.

== Origins ==
Pablo del Molino Mateus was the son of a property registrar, Pablo del Molino Martín (Cartagena, Spain) and Concepción Mateus Massana (Valladolid, Spain). Concepción Mateus inherited in 1923 from his relative Agustí Massana i Pujol (1855-1921), a man whose important legacies led to the founding of the Escola Massana. Julio Gibert Mateus, founder, among other companies, of El Hogar y La Moda, proposed to his first cousin Concepción Mateus to invest the inheritance received in shares of a publishing house that he promoted, Editorial Juventut. In this way, Concepción Mateus and her son Pablo del Molino Mateus became part of the company's board of directors, led by José Zendrera. In 1930 Pablo del Molino was appointed deputy director of Editorial Juventud. Editorial Juventud promoted at that time the collection La Novela Rosa, dedicated to sentimental and romance narratives.

In 1933, Pablo del Molino resigned as deputy director of Editorial Juventud to found Editorial Molino. Pablo del Molino favored publishing a type of adventure and crime novel from the Anglo-Saxon world, in front of the editorial line of Editorial Juventud, more focused on adventures aimed at a young audience by French and German authors. Editorial Molino published its first title already on November 10, 1933, entitled El Ruiseñor del Noroeste (Singer in the Wilderness), by William Byron Mowery, as the first number of the Biblioteca Oro (Blue Series). That same year he launched the Serie Popular Molino4, and the collection of children's stories Marujita.

Editorial Molino specialized in a genre that could be defined as popular: adventure novels, detective novels, stories of distant landscapes or in bygone times, and made its logo popular: a black windmill on top of two books, one on top of the other.

== Pre Spanish Civil War Era ==
In this early pre-war period, Editorial Molino launched the publication of the Biblioteca Oro collection, dedicated to three literary genres: the detective novel (Yellow Series), the adventure novel and the Swashbuckler (Red Series) and the Western (Blue Series). Among them, several novels by Agatha Christie were published, as well as the novels of Rafael Sabatini. The Biblioteca Oro collection published 670 titles and ceased publication in 1970.

During the prewar period, the magazine Revista Mickey was also published, of which the journalist José María Huertas Ventosa was director, and whose first issue appeared on March 7, 1935. The magazine created the first Readers' Club and reached 55,000 card and badge carrying members. The magazine ran newspaper strips, including Alex Raymond's Jim el Temerario (Jungle Jim) and Milton Caniff's Terry y los Piratas (Terry and the Pirates). It also included serialized versions of novels by Jules Verne and Emilio Salgari, drawn by Emilio Freixas. Revista Mickey published 74 issues until August 8, 1936, according to Josep Maria Huertas Clavería. Editorial Molino didn't publishing another comic books until 1965.

Editorial Molino introduced the Pop-up book in Spain in 1934 (which it called "ilustración sorpresa") after acquiring the publishing rights of the publishing house Blue Ribbon Books (New York, USA, acquired by Reynal & Hitchcock in 1933).

Editorial Molino also published the collection Hombres Audaces based on popular novels that were predecessors of the comic, and known as Pulp Magazines, which were very successful in the United States. Among them were Doc Savage (science fiction), Bill Barne Air Adventurer (aviation), Pete Rice (Western) and La Sombra (The Living Shadow, mystery). The collection began in April 1936, with 18 titles being published, and was discontinued in July 1936 due to the Spanish Civil War.

== From the Spanish Civil War to the Postwar ==
The Spanish Civil War paralyzed the magazine and all the new projects. Pablo del Molino decided to emigrate to Argentina in 1937 in order to continue operating, and settled in Buenos Aires at 1022 Migueletes street, where he had his own printing works. His brother Luis del Molino continued to lead the publishing house in Barcelona.

In the postwar period, in 1941 the collection Hombres Audaces was reinitiated, reaching 174 titles, but ending in 1949 due to publishing difficulties. Revista Mickey was not re-edited due to the problem of getting paper and paying the rights in foreign currency, difficult in the Spanish postwar period. In 1947, Luis del Molino officially became a partner with 45% of the company's shares (55% remaining for Pablo del Molino).

In 1952, Pablo del Molino decided to return to Spain and liquidate his facilities in Buenos Aires, due to the difficult political and labor situation in Argentina. On the other hand, the situation in Spain had improved a lot and paper was no longer in short supply. With the return of Pablo del Molino to Spain, the publication of many collections was renewed, especially Biblioteca Oro, and the publication of Selecciones de Biblioteca Oro, among which the books of Agatha Christie should be mentioned. At this time the series by Emilio Salgari with covers by Riera Rojas, the novels by Jules Verne, Karl May and Just William by Richmal Crompton with covers by Noiquet (Joan Beltrán Bofill) and Ángel Badía Camps were also published. The publication of the series Adventure by Enid Blyton also begins at this time.

At this time the series Cuentos de Hadas was also published, many with illustrations by Emilio Freixas, as well as the collections Historia y Leyenda and Mis Primeros Cuentos.

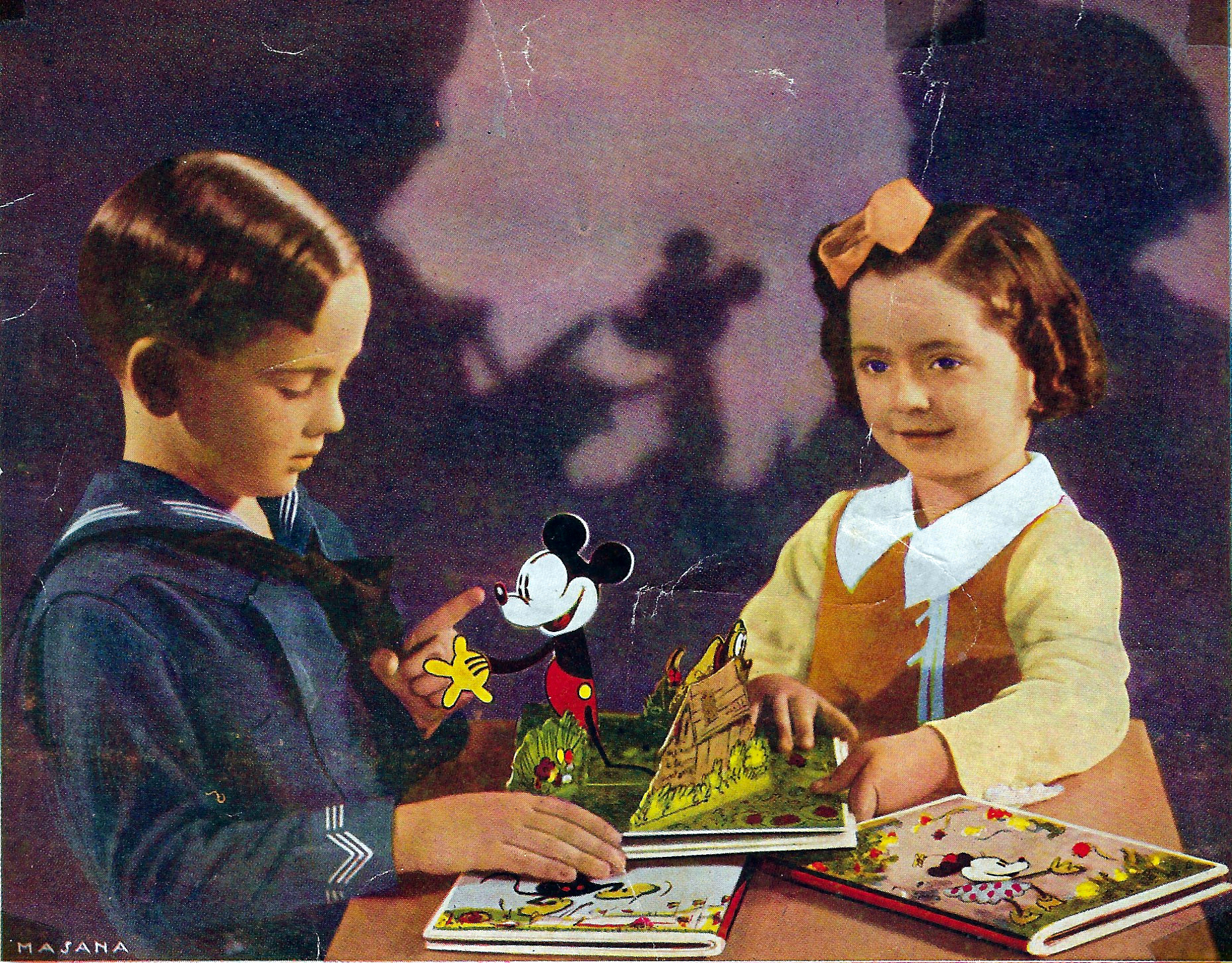
Marketing image for the pop-up book (called by Molino "Ilustracion Sorpresa") "El Ratón Mickey en el circo" ("Mickey Mouse in the circus"), 1934, with the children Maruja del Molino and Fernado Peraire del Molino.

In 1962 the headquarters moved to Carrer Calabria 166, Barcelona, with its own building and warehouses. At this time, collections such as Violeta, dedicated to the female world of work, Cómo y Por Qué (How and Why), with answers to the most frequent questions of adolescents of the time, as well as Visitando otros países (Visiting other countries), a reference series of a tourist nature, at a time in which mass tourism had not yet started. Editorial Molino returned to publishing comics in 1965, with the translation of Franco-Belgian comics of great quality in the Piloto collection, within which it published Asterix for the first time in all Spain, although only three issues. The other series that included the label were Michel Tanguy and Jerry Spring, of which they published two and three issues respectively. The Molino label started focusing on children’s and youth literature and only published a few other books with comics in the mid-1980s.

In 1968 Pablo del Molino Mateus died and his son Pablo del Molino Sterna (1937-2000) succeeded him in the direction of the publishing house. He had already worked in the publishing house since his return from Argentina in 1953 and had acquired extensive experience.

== From 1970 to the present ==
The publication of the youth series Alfred Hitchcock y Los tres investigadores (Alfred Hitchcock and The three investigators) begins, a suspense series with the peculiarity that it was written by various authors who printed a great variety of rhythm and styles that differentiated it from the rest of the youth series that were published in that decade. The eighties stood out for the publication of youth series such as Francine Pascal's Sweet Valley series. Three series were made: Sweet Valley Twins, Sweet Valley High.Sweet Valley University.

In the 90s, Editorial Molino turned to highly illustrated and high-quality children's books. It was a pioneer in the presentation of new types of books such as Libros gigantes (Giant Children's Books), as well as Cuentos sonoros (books with chips that emit sounds and melodies of popular songs).

As for youth literature in the 2000s, Editorial Molino opted for popular series that introduced young people to serious topics such as History, Science, Culture but in a fun way, looking for the most gruesome and less publicized parts. The collections were for example Esa horrible ciencia, Esa horrible historia, Esa gran cultura (That horrible science, That horrible history, That great culture).

In 2000, Pablo del Molino Sterna died and the management was left to his cousin Luis Antonio del Molino Jover, son of Luis del Molino Mateus (1945-). In June 2004, the RBA Group (Barcelona) bought Editorial Molino, and integrated the publications of Editorial Molino as RBA Molino, an editorial label of the RBA Group. In May 2021, Penguin Random House Grupo Editorial acquired Editorial Molino from RBA group.

== Legacy ==
The publishing house Editorial Molino, fruit of its seventy years of activity, published numerous works that today have acquired considerable value among collectors: Guillermo Brown (Just William) written by Richmal Crompton; Old Shatterhand and Winnetou, Hercule Poirot, Bill Barnes, The Shadow, Adventures in the jungle or in the desert, the mysteries of Enid Blyton, the fantasy of children's stories, the novels of Cecil Bernard Rutley ... about 10,000 titles. One of the great successes of this company was the edition of the magazine Revista Mickey, which in 1936 managed to bring together more than 55,000 members. Another success were the collections for adults, Biblioteca Oro and Selecciones de Biblioteca Oro, which stood out for their book covers by the painter and draftsman Roc Riera Rojas (1913-1992), who made hundreds of covers for the publishing house.

In the 1940s the collection Biblioteca Oro prevailed over any other collection, with detective novels that included Arthur Conan Doyle, and the great masters of the swashbuckling romance novel, such as Rafael Sabatini, and of the adventure genre, such as Karl May, Jules Verne or Emilio Salgari.

In the 1950s, Agatha Christie's novels were published in series of great acceptance and that have continued to be published to this day: a set that brings together nearly ten million copies sold. In 1978 the publishing house exclusively published in Spanish the long posthumous autobiography of Agatha Christie (translation by Diorki S. L.), in a single edition.

Film and television have popularized some of the characters published by Editorial Molino, such as Richmal Crompton's mischievous William Brown or Karl May's Old Shatterhand, played on the big screen by Lex Barker, without forgetting the numerous adaptations of the Jules Verne texts that have been made for the cinema.

Editorial Molino's publications have found continuity since 2004 as part of the RBA publishing group.
