= TOP gogo =

- Genre: Reality television
- Presented by: Nino Tskitishvli (Current); Salome Gviniashvili (Season 1)
- Country of origin: Georgia
- No. of seasons: 2

Production
- Production company: KikalastudioTv

Original release
- Network: Rustavi 2
- Release: May 13, 2012 – August 26, 2013

TOP gogo (TOP გოგო; English: TOP girl) is a Georgian reality television show. Georgian model Salome Gviniashvili (Georgian: სალომე ღვინიაშვილი) assumed the role of the head of the search as well as a mentor and judge for the contestants for the first season. She was replaced by Nino Tskitishvili (ნინო ცქიტიშვილი) for season two.

The premise of the series is documenting a group of young female aspiring models who live together in a house for several weeks, while they take part in various challenges, photo-shoots, and meetings with members of the modeling industry. One or more poor-performing contestants are eliminated from the competition each week, until the last contestant remaining is declared the winner, and receives a modeling contract along with other associated prizes.

The first season premiered on May 13, 2012 and ended, after a break in the airing of the show, in October. A second season featuring contestants from Belarus, Georgia, Kazakhstan, Latvia, Russia and Ukraine began to air on January 24, 2013.

== Cycles ==
Cycle	Premiere date	Winner	Runner-up	Other contestants in order of elimination	Number of contestants	International Destinations
1	May 13, 2012	Tako Mandaria	Nino Lomtadze & Sopo Tsikoridze	Mariam Mosashvili, Tatia Okropiridze & Tamo Ivanidze, Sopo Chakvetadze (disqualified), Liza Romanovskaya (quit), Salome Gogiberidze, Renata Begiashvili, Guranda Tsertsvadze, Naniko Genebashvili, Keti Tatuashvili	13	London
2	January 24, 2013	Alisa Kuzmina	Elena Filieva & Tatako Khurtsilava	Mariam Katsadze, Tanya Lauta (quit), Nuki Chikhladze, Lile Sakhelashvili, Sofi Tsiskarishvili, Elene Meladze, Maria Yakovenko, Yulia Lutsiva (quit), Maria Naumova, Lilu Iakobidze, Elene Imerlishvili, Yulia Mikhailovna, Aziza Umerzhanova, Eka Oqropiridze, Sako Tsotsoria, Evija Vilistere	19	Milan
