= Alexander Kazbegi Avenue =

Avenue in Tbilisi, Georgia

Coordinates: 41.72511°N 44.75502°E

Alexander Kazbegi avenue
- Interactive map of Alexander Kazbegi avenue
- Native name: ალექსანდრე ყაზბეგის გამზირი (Georgian)
- Former name: Pavlov Street
- Part of: Saburtalo and Vake districts, Tbilisi
- Namesake: Alexander Kazbegi
- Postal code: 0160 (#1-25, 2-16); 0177 (#27-57, 18-46)

Construction
- Construction start: 1956

Alexander Kazbegi Avenue (Georgian: ალექსანდრე ყაზბეგის გამზირი) is one of the main avenues of Tbilisi and is named after the writer Alexander Kazbegi. The avenue is located on the right bank of the Kura River in the Saburtalo and Vake districts of Tbilisi and starts at Pekini Avenue and ends at Petre Kavtaradze street.

The development of the street began in 1956 with several administrative educational buildings. Between 1941 and 1990, the street was named Pavlov Street in honour of Ivan Pavlov, the Russian and Soviet neurologist. In 1990, the street was renamed Alexander Kazbegi Avenue.
