= RTL Zwei =

German television station

- Country: Germany
- Broadcast area: Europe
- Affiliates: RTL II You
- Headquarters: Grünwald, Bavaria, Germany

Programming
- Language: German
- Picture format: 1080i HDTV (downscaled to 16:9 576i for the SDTV feed)

Ownership
- Owner: RTL Group S.A.; Heinrich Bauer Verlag KG; Tele-Munich Television Media Participation LP; Burda GmbH
- Parent: RTL Deutschland
- Sister channels: RTL; VOX; n-tv; Super RTL; Nitro; RTLup; VOXup; RTL Crime; RTL Living; RTL Passion; GEO Television

History
- Launched: 6 March 1993; 33 years ago
- Former names: RTL 2 (1993–1999); RTL II (1999–2019)

Links
- Website: rtl2.de

Availability

Terrestrial
- Digital terrestrial television: Channel numbers vary in each region

RTL Zwei (stylised as RTLZWEI), formerly spelled RTL 2 and RTL II, is a German-language television channel that is operated by RTL2 Television GmbH & Co. KG. RTL2 is a private general entertainment (Vollprogramm) tv channel on the basis of the Interstate Broadcasting Agreement (Rundfunkstaatsvertrag). Variants of the channel are produced for Austria and Switzerland, with their own advertising. They can be received via cable networks in Austria and Switzerland, and more widely by digital satellite. RTL Zwei is part-owned by RTL Group in Germany.

== History ==
RTL II was originally scheduled to begin broadcasting on 26 September 1992; some TV guides were anticipating the channel's launch. However, the channel's launch was delayed until 1993 because LPR Hessen (known as the Hessische Landesanstalt für privaten Rundfunk) repeatedly raised concerns about the channel's shareholder structure to German media authorities. The shares of the channel's initial owners (RTL Television, CLT, Bertelsmann, Burda and FAZ) had to be reduced to below 25% before the licence for the channel could be awarded to RTL. The channel eventually started broadcasting on 6 March 1993 at 6:09 a.m., using what used to be Screensport's transponder. (Screensport ceased operations five days earlier as a result of its merger with Eurosport) on the Astra satellite service. The first programme on the channel was the movie Little Miss Marker.

In 2000, RTL II began broadcasting the shows Popstars and Big Brother. Popstars ran on the channel for two seasons before it moved to ProSieben, while Big Brother continued to air until 2011.

The network began offering a video on demand service in February 2012.

As of 7 October 2019, the channel was rebranded as RTLZWEI. The number 2 was spelt out for the first time in the station's history. The design was developed with the agency mehappy GmbH.

=== Visual identity (logos) ===
RTL 2's logo from 6 March 1993 to 6 April 1996; similar to the logo used by KGAN/Cedar Rapids from 1993 to 2004

RTL 2's logo from 6 April 1996 to 1999

The first version of the channel's circular "II" logo was used from 1999 to 2001.

Updated version of 1999 logo; used from 2001 to 2009

RTL II's from 2009 to 2019

== Ownership ==
The channel is operated by RTL2 TV GmbH & Co. KG, which was founded in 1992 and employs around 210 people. Andreas Bartl has been managing director since June 2014. The company was originally headquartered in Cologne, but is now run from the municipality of Grünwald, to the south of Munich; only its news department is still based in Cologne, in order to share RTL news production facilities. The company is jointly owned by RTL Group S.A. (35.9%), Bauer Media Group (31.5%), Tele-Munich Television Media Participation LP (31.5%, of which the Leonine Holding and The Walt Disney Company hold 50% each). and Hubert Burda Media (1.1%)

== Programming ==
Programming pillars are daily episodes of the local Big Brother in access prime-time, and a prime-time lineup consisting mostly of docu soaps, movies and licensed series such as 24 and Stargate SG-1. Recent efforts to move further towards quality programming with science magazine shows and documentaries have met with an indifferent audience response.

The channel's prime-time newscast RTL II News is frequently criticized for its selection of news stories, which cater to a younger audience; for example, it has been known to put a CD release or the launch of a new gaming console in the second headline slot directly after the day's top event. This unconventional approach has brought RTL II's broadcasting licence into jeopardy at least once, as a German commercial broadcaster has to feature minimum amounts of serious information and culture programming to be allowed a full channel licence. In addition to its own news programmes (RTL II News, RTL II Spezial. Das Magazin and Das Nachrichtenjournal), the channel commissions shows from independent producers which air in the afternoons.

=== Afternoon programming ===
In the afternoon, the channel now primarily features its own docu soap and reality show productions.

=== Prime-time ===
Among its prime-time line-up the channel's own docu soap productions such as Die Geissens – Eine schrecklich glamouröse Familie and Frauentausch are particularly successful. Various US shows such as Game of Thrones and The Walking Dead have been the most successful series of RTL II's prime-time slot. Its late-night line-up also featured North American series such as Autopsie – Mysteriöse Todesfälle and Flashpoint.

=== Anime and children's programming ===
RTL II has offered the largest anime content of all free-to-air German-language TV channels. It aired about over 80 Anime series and also broadcast cartoons. On weekdays, RTL II also aired an anime afternoon in their children/youth "Pokito" slot. Following tensions with media authorities, RTL II's standards and practices department was believed to be especially sensitive about children's programming. As a consequence, the channel has cut scenes from anime series like Detective Conan, InuYasha, One Piece and Naruto, for which it has received criticism from anime fans. Even some episodes where the original version had previously been given a FSK 6 rating, meaning that it was suitable for children ages 6 up and may legally be aired at all hours of the day, have been edited down. In February 2013, RTL II announced that its Sunday morning children's programme would be discontinued as of 21 April 2013. A separate and short-lived online channel for anime was launched in April.

=== German premieres ===
RTL II was the first channel to introduce various foreign TV formats on German television such as:

- The Final Countdown: a show aired at the start of the new millennium lasting 24 hours and showing celebrations in various locations all over the world.
- Popstars in 2000 was the first casting show aired on German television.
- Jack Point Jack in 2003 was the first interactive movie on German television.
- Bollywood movies: On 19 November 2004 RTL II aired Sometimes happiness, sometimes sadness (German: In guten wie in schweren Tagen - original title: Kabhi Khushi Kabhie Gham), the first dubbed Bollywood movie on German television, and achieved an audience share of over 12.3% among the target group of 14- to 49-year-olds. Due to its success, Indian movies have been regularly aired on the channel ever since. Previously, Bollywood movies had been broadcast in Hindi with German subtitles on ARTE and VOX.

== Audience share ==
=== Germany ===
View chart definition.

	January	February	March	April	May	June	July	August	September	October	November	December	Annual average
1993	-	-	-	-	-	-	-	-	-	-	-	-	2.6%
1994	-	-	-	-	-	-	-	-	-	-	-	-	▲3.8%
1995	-	-	-	-	-	-	-	-	-	-	-	-	▲4.6%
1996	4.6%	4.1%	4.4%	4.8%	4.5%	4.3%	4.6%	4.5%	4.6%	4.6%	4.5%	4.1%	▼4.5%
1997	4.1%	4.4%	4.3%	4.1%	4.2%	4.0%	3.8%	3.6%	3.6%	4.2%	3.8%	3.9%	▼4.0%
1998	3.7%	3.9%	3.9%	4.1%	3.8%	3.4%	3.6%	3.9%	3.8%	3.8%	3.7%	3.6%	▼3.8%
1999	3.6%	3.4%	3.4%	3.7%	4.0%	3.9%	4.4%	4.5%	4.6%	4.3%	4.2%	4.2%	▲4.0%
2000	4.3%	4.1%	4.6%	5.5%	5.7%	5.0%	4.5%	4.8%	4.8%	5.6%	4.9%	4.5%	▲4.8%
2001	4.4%	3.9%	3.9%	4.0%	4.0%	4.0%	3.7%	4.0%	4.0%	4.3%	4.2%	3.8%	▼4.0%
2002	4.1%	3.7%	4.1%	4.0%	4.5%	4.1%	4.3%	4.1%	4.2%	3.4%	3.2%	3.2%	▼3.9%
2003	4.1%	4.2%	4.0%	4.8%	5.1%	5.6%	5.1%	4.9%	4.7%	4.8%	4.6%	4.6%	▲4.7%
2004	4.5%	4.5%	5.3%	5.1%	5.1%	4.8%	5.2%	4.9%	5.4%	4.9%	4.7%	4.5%	▲4.9%
2005	4.4%	4.7%	4.4%	4.0%	4.4%	4.3%	4.2%	4.0%	4.0%	4.3%	3.9%	3.7%	▼4.2%
2006	3.8%	3.6%	3.7%	3.9%	3.8%	3.4%	3.9%	4.0%	3.8%	3.9%	3.9%	3.8%	▼3.8%
2007	3.4%	3.7%	3.7%	4.1%	4.0%	4.1%	4.2%	4.1%	3.7%	3.8%	3.8%	3.9%	▲3.9%
2008	3.6%	3.9%	4.0%	4.1%	4.3%	3.5%	4.1%	3.8%	3.8%	3.7%	3.6%	3.6%	▼3.8%
2009	3.7%	3.7%	3.9%	4.2%	4.1%	4.3%	4.1%	4.0%	3.7%	4.0%	3.9%	4.0%	▲3.9%
2010	3.8%	3.8%	4.0%	4.0%	4.0%	3.5%	3.9%	3.9%	3.7%	3.7%	3.7%	3.6%	▼3.8%
2011	3.4%	3.5%	3.4%	3.5%	3.6%	3.7%	3.7%	3.7%	3.6%	3.7%	3.7%	3.8%	▼3.6%
2012	3.6%	3.7%	3.9%	3.8%	4.0%	3.7%	4.3%	4.1%	4.1%	4.2%	4.5%	4.3%	▲4.0%
2013	3.9%	4.1%	4.1%	4.1%	4.3%	4.1%	4.3%	4.4%	4.0%	4.2%	4.4%	4.3%	▲4.2%
2014	3.9%	3.8%	3.8%	4.1%	4.0%	3.4%	3.6%	3.9%	3.9%	3.9%	4.0%	3.9%	▼3.9%
2015	3.6%	3.7%	4.0%	3.9%	3.8%	3.7%	3.8%	3.5%	3.6%	3.5%	3.2%	3.3%	▼3.7%
2016	3.3%	3.6%	3.5%	3.7%	3.8%	3.2%	3.4%	3.3%	3.5%	3.5%	3.5%	3.2%	▼3.5%
2017	3.1%	3.1%	3.2%	3.2%	3.2%	3.2%	3.4%	3.1%	2.9%	3.1%	3.1%	3.2%	▼3.2%
2018	2.9%	3.1%	3.0%	3.0%									

The average age of the viewers is 43.5 years (as of 2016).
