= RTLup =

German television channel

- Country: Germany
- Broadcast area: Germany
- Headquarters: Cologne, Germany

Programming
- Language: German
- Picture format: 1080i HDTV (downscaled to 16:9 576i for the SDTV feed)

Ownership
- Owner: RTL Group
- Parent: RTL Deutschland
- Sister channels: RTL; VOX n-tv Super RTL; RTL Zwei; Nitro; VOXup; RTL Crime; RTL Living; RTL Passion; GEO Television

History
- Launched: 4 June 2016
- Former names: RTLplus (2016-2021)

Links
- Website: rtl-plus.de

Availability

Streaming media
- Zattoo: -

RTLup (formerly RTLplus) is a German free-to-air television channel of the RTL Group, which is mainly aimed at female viewers aged 45 and over. Its schedule consists largely of documentary soaps and court shows.

The channel was renamed to RTLup on 15 September 2021 as part of a larger rebranding of all RTL channels.

== Logo History ==
former station logo of RTLplus from 2019 to 2021

== Audience share ==
=== Germany ===
	January	February	March	April	May	June	July	August	September	October	November	December	Annual average
2016	-	-	-	-	-	0.3%	0.4%	0.6%	0.7%	0.8%	0.9%	0.9%	0.4%
2017	1.0%	0.9%	1.0%	1.0%	1.0%	1.1%	1.1%	1.1%	1.1%	1.2%	1.2%	1.1%	▲1.1%
2018	1.2%												
