= Super RTL =

German television network

- Country: Germany
- Broadcast area: Germany; Austria; Switzerland
- Headquarters: Cologne, Germany

Programming
- Timeshift service: Toggo Plus

Ownership
- Owner: RTL Group
- Parent: RTL Deutschland
- Sister channels: RTL; VOX n-tv RTL Zwei; Nitro; RTLup; VOXup; RTL Crime; RTL Living; RTL Passion; GEO Television

History
- Launched: 28 April 1995; 31 years ago

Links
- Website: rtl-super.de toggo.de

Availability

Terrestrial
- Digital terrestrial television: Channel slots vary on each region

Super RTL is a German free-to-air television network owned by SUPER RTL Fernsehen GmbH, a fully owned subsidiary of RTL Deutschland. The channel originally launched in 1995 as a joint venture between RTL Group predecessor company CLT-UFA and Disney's Buena Vista International Television Investments (later Disney International Operations) division, with the venture then-known as RTL Disney Fernsehen GmbH & Co. KG.

The channel airs daily from 5:00am-12:00am under two different programming slots; Toggo (5:00am-8:00pm), which is aimed at children, and RTL Super (8:00pm-12:00am), which is aimed at families and young adults.

== History ==
On 24 August 1994, with Jeffrey Katzenberg's resignation, a reorganization of The Walt Disney Company took place in which Richard Frank became head of newly formed Disney Television and Telecommunications (DTT), which included Walt Disney Television International, which held Disney's Super RTL stake. The Luxembourgish CLT (owners of the German RTL channel) made a deal with Disney to form RTL Disney Fernsehen GmbH & Co. in 1995.

=== Super RTL ===
Super RTL was finally launched on 28 April 1995, with The New Adventures of Winnie the Pooh as its first ever program (aside from showing Disney Channel's "TV" ident, Super RTL is not owned by Disney Branded Television, instead, it was owned by Disney's Buena Vista International Television Investments division). The Disney-CC/ABC merger led to DTT being split up in April 1996, Walt Disney Television International was transferred to Capital Cities/ABC in that same month. CC/ABC combined the international units, Walt Disney Television International and ACIBG, into Disney–ABC International Television (DAIT) in July. Around the same time, in the 1990s, Bertelsmann ultimately came out on top after having gradually increased its stake in the German television channel RTL. Following a legal dispute with RTL/CLT, Bertelsmann announced plans to merge the television businesses of UFA to form the joint venture CLT-UFA in April 1996. A merger agreement was signed on 8 July 1996. It was approved by the CLT board of directors on 5 December, and the formation of CLT-UFA was completed on 14 January 1997. As a result, German television channels such as RTL Television, Super RTL and VOX and international broadcasting services, including M6 in France, were all brought together under one roof.

The Fun & Action Tour, a Germany-wide roadshow event for children, was started in 1997 featuring TV program characters. The tour was later renamed to Toggo Tour. The following year, the channel became the top view channel by the 3-to-13-year-old target age group.

In 1999, the joint venture saw its channel make a net profit of DM 4.5 million, launched its website and started the Super RTL Licensing Agency to make more revenues from TV licensing. A new managing director, Claude Schmit, took charge of the venture in 2000.

Also in 2000, the preschool programming was placed into a block called "Toggolino". Toggolino Club is started in 2002 and offers paid pre-school children education content.

The Toggo umbrella brand was introduced in 2001 for all activities for 6- to 13-year-old children. In 2002, Sony BMG label, Berlin Records, released the first Toggo Music CD. SuperRTL began using the 'Family Cartoon' rating label in 2006 for family viewing suitable animated films shown on Friday and Saturday night.

In 2005, Super RTL was granted a broadcast license for the preschool pay-TV channel Toggolino TV by the government media regulators for young children between the ages of 3 and 6. However, Toggolino TV was never launched. Bertelsmann turned over the learning platform Scoyo to Super RTL in 2009. In mid-2013, Super RTL, RTL II and four other RTL channels were available over Zattoo live streaming service under the first deal between a German broadcaster and an over the top platform company.

=== Program contents' changes, and post-Disney era (2014-present) ===
With the announcement of the launch of a free-to-air German version of Disney Channel causing a loss of Disney programming, Super RTL signed volume deals in October 2013 with Warner Bros. Worldwide Television Distribution and Sony Pictures Television for a slate of animated features and DreamWorks Animation (DWA) for 1,200 hours of programming until 2020. The DWA deal included shows from the Classic Media library. The channel also acquired programming to expand its views in the evenings with more adult TV shows to debut in its fall 2014 schedule: ABC Family's Pretty Little Liars, ABC's Once Upon a Time and Scandal and Syfy's Lost Girl supernatural series. As of 1 January 2014, Disney programming left the channel, because the broadcast version of Disney Channel launched on 17 January. However, Disney continued to hold its stake in the station.

RTL Disney TV LP launched its Kividoo subscription video-on-demand (SVOD) services on 28 April 2015. In February 2016, RTL Disney Television LP received approval for a second channel from the anti-media concentration commission KEK. granted the 10-year license to the company. On 15 March, RTL Disney TV announced that the second channel's name as "Toggo plus" after receiving the broadcast license from media authorities' licensing and supervision commission ZAK. Toggo Plus was planned to launch on 4 June 2016. Super RTL continued to expand its Toggo brand with plans to launch Toggo Radio channel, the first German children and family friendly channel, at the end of May 2020.

=== Sale of Disney stake and rebranding of Primetime block to RTL Super (2021-present) ===
On March 3, 2021, the RTL Group announced it had fully acquired Disney's stake in RTL Disney Fernsehen GmbH & Co. KG, putting Super RTL under its full control for the first time.

At the end of July 2023, it was announced that Super RTL would be renamed to "RTL Super" in the middle of August 2023. However, it was later confirmed that only Super RTL Primetime would rebrand under the name, and that the existing Super RTL channel wouldn't be affected.

In October 2024, it was announced that the Toggolino brand would cease to exist, with all children's programming being branded under the singular "Toggo" name.

=== Scrapped merger with Nickelodeon Germany (2024) ===
On April 24, 2024, Super RTL entered into a new major partnership with Paramount Global to secure a new free-to-air broadcast deal for Nickelodeon programming in Germany, and to fully acquire Nickelodeon Germany and replace it with a standalone Toggo branded network, subject to approval. On 18 September, it was announced that the German Federal Cartel Office (FCO) had blocked the Nickelodeon channel deal.

== Programming ==
=== Children's ===
- Abominable and the Invisible City
- Alvinnn!!! and the Chipmunks
- Agent 203
- Angelo Rules
- Barbie: It Takes Two
- Barbie Dreamhouse Adventures
- Bella and the Bulldogs
- Boy Girl Dog Cat Mouse Cheese
- The Deep
- DreamWorks Dragons: The Nine Realms
- The Fairly OddParents
- Grizzy & the Lemmings
- Inspector Gadget
- Karate Sheep
- Jade Armor
- Lana Longbeard
- Lego City Adventures
- LEGO DreamzZz
- The Loud House
- Monster Loving Maniacs
- Mighty Express
- Mighty Mike
- Mr. Bean: The Animated Series
- Nate Is Late
- Ninjago
- New Looney Tunes
- Pokémon Ultimate Journeys: The Series
- Rabbids Invasion
- Sally Bollywood: Super Detective
- Scooby-Doo and Guess Who?
- SpongeBob SquarePants
- Star Trek: Prodigy
- Tom and Jerry
- The Thundermans
- The Tom and Jerry Show
- The Really Loud House
- Wild Kratts
- Woozle Goozle
- Zak Storm

=== Pre-School ===
- 44 Cats
- Billy the Cowboy Hamster
- Caillou
- Cocomelon
- Dino Ranch
- Hello Kitty: Super Style!
- Milo
- Octonauts: Above & Beyond
- Paw Patrol
- Peppa Pig
- Peter Rabbit
- Pertronix Defenders
- Pocoyo
- Rubble & Crew
- Ranger Rob
- Super Wings
- Wow! Wow! Wubbzy!

=== RTL Super ===
- Angel
- Bones
- Columbo
- CSI: Miami
- Caïn
- House
- Monk
- Mr. Bean
- On the Case
- Rizzoli and Isles
- Snapped
- The Stalker Files
- Without a Trace
- The X-Files

== Former programming ==
=== Toggo ===
- Almost Naked Animals
- Angela Anaconda
- Ben 10 (Revival series)
- Butt-Ugly Martians
- Camp Lakebottom
- Camp Lazlo
- DreamWorks Dragons
- George of the Jungle
- The Jungle Bunch
- Lassie
- The Lone Ranger
- My Knight and Me
- NASCAR Racers
- Numb Chucks
- The Powerpuff Girls
- Phineas and Ferb
- Sabrina: The Animated Series
- Sabrina's Secret Life
- The Skinner Boys: Guardians of the Lost Secrets
- Turbo Fast
- Zip Zip

=== Toggolino ===
- Angelina Ballerina: The Next Steps
- Bob the Builder (original series)
- Bob the Builder (revival series)
- Blaze and the Monster Machines
- Calimero (2013 series)
- Daniel Tiger's Neighborhood
- Kate & Mim-Mim
- Justin Time
- Madeline
- Mike the Knight
- Octonauts
- Peg + Cat
- Pirates: Adventures in Art
- Strawberry Shortcake
- Tiny Planets
- Trucktown

=== Ravensburger TV ===
- The Brothers Flub
- Brum
- Clowning Around
- Costa
- Donkey Kong Country (season 2)
- Enid Blyton – Secret Series
- Flying Rhino Junior High
- George Shrinks
- Rotten Ralph
- Spielgalaxie
- Sweat
- Timothy Goes to School

== Programming blocks ==
Logo for RTL Super, Super RTL's evening strand.

Super RTL's broadcast day is split between two different umbrella brands.

- Toggo - Super RTL's main umbrella brand. Originally focused towards a 6-13-year-old audience, but since October 2024, it has also been used for pre-school programming. The brand was first introduced in 2001.
- RTL Super - Airs repeats of drama shows and family-oriented live-action movies. The brand was first introduced in 2019 as Super RTL Primetime and was renamed in August 2023.

From 3 June 2001 until 2005, Super RTL ran a strand titled Ravensburger TV. Operated by RTV Family Entertainment (now Your Family Entertainment), this block aired for two hours every day except for Saturdays, and functioned as a bridge-in-gap between Toggolino and Toggo, airing programs aimed at both demographics.

From 2000 until 2024, pre-school programs were branded under the Toggolino brand.

== Related services ==
=== Kividoo ===
A subscription video-on-demand (SVOD) service that was launched on 28 April 2015. It features children's shows from DreamWorks Animation, Studio Hamburg, ZDF Enterprises, HIT Entertainment, BBC Studios and German publishing house Tessloff Verlag.

=== Toggo Plus ===
Logo of Toggo Plus

On 15 March 2016, it was announced that a timeshift service, Toggo Plus, would launch on 4 June 2016. The channel transmits Toggo and Toggolino's programs one hour later. Unlike the main Super RTL network, it is a paid service, and does not timeshift the "RTL Super" slot. Infomercials would fill out the remaining time. The launch allowed the Toggo/Toggolino strand to begin at 5:00am instead of 6:00am compared to before.

=== Toggo Radio ===
Logo of Toggo Radio

A radio channel that was launched on 15 June 2020. The channel is available on Super RTL platforms, online radio aggregators and smart devices and via Digital Audio Broadcasting, but not FM. Its content consists of chart music, children's songs and radio plays.
