= Nitro (German TV channel) =

German television station

NITRO
- Country: Germany

Programming
- Picture format: 1080i HDTV (downscaled to 16:9 576i for the SDTV feed)

Ownership
- Owner: RTL Group
- Parent: RTL Deutschland
- Sister channels: RTL; VOX n-tv Super RTL; RTL Zwei; RTL Up; VOX Up; RTL Crime; RTL Living; RTL Passion; GEO Television

History
- Launched: 1 April 2012
- Former names: RTL Nitro (2012–2017)

Links
- Website: www.nitro-tv.de

Availability

Terrestrial
- Digital terrestrial television: Channel numbers vary on each region

NITRO is a German free-to-air television channel owned by RTL Deutschland. It was launched on 1 April 2012 as RTL Nitro. It was renamed Nitro on 30 July 2017.

== Conception ==
NITRO's slogan is „Fernsehen für Helden“ (television for heroes). It describes itself as a "premium entertainment channel" ("Premium-Unterhaltungssender") for a broad audience. It mainly targets males aged between 20 and 59.

The channel contains many old German and American series and films, but also first runs of some American series such as Modern Family, Nurse Jackie or Chase.

On 2 April 2012, the video on demand site RTL Nitro Now launched, where several shows can be viewed seven days after airing.

=== Nitro HD ===
Nitro HD, a high-definition simulcast of Nitro, was launched on 28 August 2012 on cable provider Kabel Deutschland, and became available via NetCologne on 1 September 2012. Broadcast of RTL Nitro HD via Satellite started on 8 April 2014, available with an HD+ subscription.

== Logo History ==
Logo from 2012 until 2017

== Programming ==
=== Original programming (from RTL Group) ===
==== Magazines ====
- Auto Mobil, car magazine show (2012—present)

==== Entertainment ====
- Ab ins Beet – Die Garten-Soap, docu-soap (2012—present)
- Anwälte der Toten, docu-soap (2012—present)
- Die Autohändler, docu-soap (2012—present)
- Die Küchenchefs, docu-soap (2012—present)
- Die lustigsten Schlamassel der Welt, clip show (2012—present)
- Das perfekte Promi-Dinner, cooking (2012—present)
- Das Strafgericht, court show (2012—present)
- Die Trovatos – Detektive decken auf, docu-soap (2012—present)
- Höllische Nachbarn, comedy (2012—present)
- Schneller als die Polizei erlaubt, docu-soap (2012—present)
- Unter Volldampf!, documentary (2012—present)
- Recht & Ordnung (2012—present)

==== TV Series ====
- Alarm für Cobra 11 – Die Autobahnpolizei, action series (2012—present)
- Balko, comedy drama (2012—present)
- Im Namen des Gesetzes, drama (2012—present)

=== Imported programming ===
==== Entertainment ====
===== Current =====
- American Pickers (American Pickers – Die Trödelsammler) (2013–present)
- Border Security: Canada's Front Line (Border Patrol Canada – Einsatz an der Grenze) (2018–present)
- Forensic Files (Medical Detectives – Geheimnisse der Gerichtsmedizin) (2013–present)
- MythBusters (MythBusters – Die Wissensjäger) (2018–present)
- Nothing to Declare UK (Border Control UK – Schmugglern auf der Spur) (2019–present)
- Pawn Stars (Die Drei vom Pfandhaus) (2013–present)
- SchleFaZ (2024–present)
- Die schöne SchleFaZ Pause (2025)
- The First 48 (The First 48 – Am Tatort mit den US-Ermittlern) (2015–present)
- Top Gear (2014—present)

===== Former =====
- Ice Road Truckers (2012—2014)
- Mayday (2012)
- Takeshi's Castle (2017-2021)

==== TV series ====
===== Current =====
- According to Jim (Immer wieder Jim) (2018—present)
- Airwolf (2015–present)
- ALF (2013—present)
- Batman (2019—present)
- CSI: Crime Scene Investigation (CSI: Den Tätern auf der Spur); crime series (2012—present)
- CSI: Miami; crime series (2012—present)
- CSI: New York; crime series (2012—present)
- Family Matters (Alle unter einem Dach) (2014—present)
- Hogan's Heroes (Ein Käfig voller Helden) (2016—present)
- Home Improvement (Hör mal, wer da hämmert) (2012—present)
- JAG (J.A.G. - Im Auftrag der Ehre) (2018–present)
- Knight Rider (2012—present)
- Law & Order (2012—present)
- Law & Order: Special Victims Unit (2013—present)
- Leverage (2016–present)
- Leverage: Redemption (Leverage 2.0) (2022—present)
- M*A*S*H (2014—present)
- Magnum, P.I. (Magnum) (2016–present)
- Matlock (2013–present)
- Miami Vice (2016–present)
- Renegade (Renegade - Gnadenlose Jagd) (2014—present)
- Stargate SG-1 (2017–present)
- The A-Team (Das A-Team) (2016–present)
- The Fall Guy (Ein Colt für alle Fälle) (2013–present)
- The King of Queens (King of Queens) (2015–present)
- Walker, Texas Ranger (2012–present)
- White Collar (2018—present)

===== Former =====
- 12 Monkeys (2016)
- 21 Jump Street (21 Jump Street - Tatort Klassenzimmer) (2013)
- 24; drama series (2012)
- Alcatraz (2012—2013)
- American Dad! (2012—2016)
- Anger Management (2014-2017)
- Breakout Kings (2013, 2015–2016)
- Charlie's Angels (Drei Engel für Charlie) (2012—2013)
- Chase (2012—2014)
- Cheers (2013-2015)
- CHiPs (2015–2017)
- Columbo (2012—2019)
- Covert Affairs (2013)
- Earth 2 (2015)
- From Dusk till Dawn: The Series (From Dusk Till Dawn - Die Serie) (2017–2019)
- Kevin Can Wait (2018)
- Kojak (2013–2015)
- Kung Fu: The Legend Continues (Kung Fu - Im Zeichen des Drachen) (2015-2017)
- Law & Order: Trial by Jury (2015–2018)
- Lois & Clark: The New Adventures of Superman (Superman - Die Abenteuer von Lois & Clark) (2014-2016)
- Longmire (2014-2019)
- Malcolm in the Middle (Malcolm mittendrin) (2019-2020)
- Married... with Children (Eine schrecklich nette Familie) (2014—2015)
- Modern Family (2012—2016)
- Moonlighting (Das Model und der Schnüffler) (2013-2015)
- Mr. Robot (2017)
- My Name Is Earl (2013-2017)
- Nurse Jackie (2012—2013)
- Parker Lewis Can't Lose (Parker Lewis − Der Coole von der Schule) (2016)
- Prison Break (2012—2015)
- Psych (2017)
- Quantum Leap (Zurück in die Vergangenheit) (2014—2017)
- Quincy (2012—2013)
- Raising Hope (2012—2014)
- Riptide (Trio mit vier Fäusten) (2013-2016)
- Russian Dolls: Sex Trade (Matrioshki - Mädchenhändler) (2014)
- Scrubs (Scrubs - Die Anfänger) (2019)
- Seinfeld (2014-2015)
- Simon & Simon (2012—2020)
- Sliders (Sliders - Das Tor in eine fremde Dimension) (2016-2017)
- Smallville (2012)
- T. J. Hooker (2017–2019)
- The Equalizer (Der Schutzengel von New York) (2012)
- The Fresh Prince of Bel-Air (Der Prinz von Bel-Air) (2014/2018)
- The League (2013-2014)
- The Office (2012)
- The Rockford Files (Detektiv Rockford – Anruf genügt) (2012—2015)
- The Unit (The Unit - Eine Frage der Ehre) (2014-2015)
- 'Til Death (Ehe ist …) (2013-2014)
- Who's the Boss? (Wer ist hier der Boss?) (2012—2015)

== Audience share ==
=== Germany ===
	January	February	March	April	May	June	July	August	September	October	November	December	Annual average
2012	-	-	-	-	-	-	-	0.4%	0.4%	0.5%	0.6%	0.5%	0.3%
2013	0.5%	0.6%	0.6%	0.6%	0.6%	0.7%	0.7%	0.7%	0.7%	0.7%	0.8%	1.0%	▲0.7%
2014	1.0%	1.0%	1.2%	1.3%	1.4%	1.4%	1.4%	1.4%	1.5%	1.4%	1.4%	1.4%	▲1.3%
2015	1.3%	1.4%	1.4%	1.4%	1.4%	1.6%	1.4%	1.5%	1.5%	1.4%	1.4%	1.4%	▲1.4%
2016	1.3%	1.4%	1.4%	1.4%	1.4%	1.2%	1.3%	1.3%	1.3%	1.3%	1.4%	1.4%	▼1.3%
2017	1.5%	1.5%	1.5%	1.7%	1.7%	1.7%	1.7%	1.7%	1.7%	1.6%	1.7%	1.5%	▲1.6%
2018													
