= N-tv =

German television news channel

n-tv
- Country: Germany
- Broadcast area: Germany; Switzerland; Austria
- Headquarters: Cologne, Germany

Programming
- Language: German
- Picture format: 1080i HDTV (downscaled to 16:9 576i for the SDTV feed)

Ownership
- Owner: RTL Group
- Parent: RTL Deutschland
- Sister channels: RTL; VOX; Super RTL; RTL Zwei; Nitro; RTLup; VOXup; RTL Crime; RTL Living; RTL Passion; GEO Television

History
- Launched: 30 November 1992; 33 years ago

Links
- Website: n-tv.de

Availability

Terrestrial
- Digital terrestrial television (Germany): channel slots vary

Streaming media
- n-tv.de: Watch live

n-tv (styled ntv) is a German free-to-air television news channel owned by RTL Deutschland. n-tv broadcasts news and weather every hour and half-hour in the morning. It also broadcasts magazine shows and documentaries.

== History ==
n-tv began as a business development project at Time Warner International which, under the leadership of then-chairman Steve Ross, was looking for ways to grow its businesses internationally. Time Warner at the time was a major shareholder in Turner Broadcasting System, parent company of CNN (both now part of Warner Bros. Discovery), and began looking for ways to get into the news channel business internationally. In 1991, under the direction of Tom McGrath, the then-president of Time-Warner International Broadcasting, the company developed a strategy for Austria, Germany, and the German-speaking areas of Switzerland.

One of McGrath's pet projects was a German-language 24-hour news channel. McGrath secured the last available transponder on the Kopernikus satellite and secured several terrestrial television licenses for transmission of what would become n-tv. McGrath then recruited several German companies including the Otto Group and Apax Partners as partners, and recruited Karl Kuhlo, an experienced German broadcaster, as the CEO.

The station started broadcasting on 30 November 1992, headquartered in Berlin. In doing so, it became the first German-language news channel. In 1994, CNN bought 27.5% of the company, and later increased its share to 50%.

In 2004, the station's headquarters were moved to Cologne, where other RTL stations are based.

RTL Group took full control of n-tv in 2006, having acquired half the company in 2002.

In September 2010, n-tv moved to the Rheinhallen media center in Cologne-Deutz, where all of RTL's TV operations in Germany are based.

n-tv gained a new visual identity, a new logo and graphics package from 1 September 2017. Another sister channel, RTL was also rebranded.

== Logos ==
1992 – July 2003

2003 – November 2008

2003 – 2008

– 31 December 2010 ("off-air" logo)

20 February 2011 – 31 August 2017

20 September 2013 – 31 August 2017

1 September 2017 – present

1 September 2017 – present

== Programming ==
n-tv broadcasts news, business and talk shows. The channel broadcasts news from Monday to Friday on the hour. In the morning every half-hour (between 7 and 9 o'clock every 15 minutes). At weekends, the channel broadcasts news every hour. After 8 pm, n-tv broadcasts 15 minute news bulletins, focused on business news.

The channel also broadcasts documentaries and magazine shows focused on sport and lifestyle. A ticker at the bottom of the screen shows news, business and sports headlines as well as weather and stock market information.

== Wall Street coverage ==
Several correspondents report live from the floor of the New York Stock Exchange, the NASDAQ and the New York Mercantile Exchange, including Jens Korte, Lars Halter, and Markus Koch.

== Former staff ==
- Christoph Keese

== Audience share ==
=== Germany ===
	January	February	March	April	May	June	July	August	September	October	November	December	Annual average
1994	–	–	–	–	–	–	–	–	–	–	–	–	0.3%
1995	–	–	–	–	–	–	–	–	–	–	–	–	0.3%
1996	0.3%	0.3%	0.3%	0.3%	0.3%	0.3%	0.3%	0.3%	0.3%	0.3%	0.4%	0.4%	0.3%
1997	0.4%	0.4%	0.4%	0.4%	0.4%	0.4%	0.6%	0.6%	0.5%	0.5%	0.4%	0.5%	▲0.5%
1998	0.4%	0.5%	0.5%	0.6%	0.5%	0.6%	0.6%	0.7%	0.7%	0.7%	0.6%	0.6%	▲0.6%
1999	0.6%	0.6%	0.9%	1.1%	0.7%	0.8%	0.8%	0.6%	0.6%	0.5%	0.6%	0.7%	▲0.7%
2000	0.7%	0.8%	0.8%	0.8%	0.7%	0.7%	0.7%	0.8%	0.6%	0.6%	0.7%	0.5%	0.7%
2001	0.6%	0.6%	0.5%	0.6%	0.5%	0.6%	0.6%	0.5%	1.2%	1.0%	0.8%	0.6%	0.7%
2002	0.5%	0.5%	0.5%	0.6%	0.6%	0.5%	0.7%	0.9%	0.7%	0.7%	0.5%	0.5%	▼0.6%
2003	0.5%	0.6%	1.1%	1.0%	0.6%	0.6%	0.6%	0.6%	0.5%	0.5%	0.5%	0.6%	0.6%
2004	0.6%	0.5%	0.5%	0.6%	0.6%	0.5%	0.6%	0.5%	0.5%	0.4%	0.5%	0.7%	▼0.5%
2005	0.7%	0.5%	0.5%	0.8%	0.6%	0.6%	0.7%	0.7%	0.8%	0.6%	0.6%	0.5%	▲0.6%
2006	0.6%	0.6%	0.6%	0.6%	0.7%	0.5%	0.7%	0.7%	0.6%	0.6%	0.6%	0.7%	0.6%
2007	0.7%	0.6%	0.6%	0.6%	0.7%	0.7%	0.7%	0.7%	0.7%	0.7%	0.7%	0.8%	0.7%
2008	0.8%	0.7%	0.8%	0.8%	0.9%	0.8%	0.9%	0.8%	0.9%	1.0%	0.8%	0.8%	▲0.8%
2009	0.9%	0.8%	0.9%	1.0%	0.9%	1.0%	1.0%	0.9%	0.8%	0.8%	0.8%	0.9%	▲0.9%
2010	0.9%	0.8%	0.8%	1.0%	0.9%	0.8%	1.0%	0.9%	0.9%	0.9%	0.8%	0.9%	0.9%
2011	0.9%	1.0%	1.6%	1.1%	1.0%	1.0%	1.1%	1.0%	0.9%	0.9%	0.9%	0.9%	▲1.0%
2012	1.0%	0.9%	0.9%	1.0%	1.0%	0.9%	1.0%	0.9%	0.9%	1.1%	0.9%	1.0%	▼0.9%
2013	0.9%	0.9%	0.9%	1.0%	1.0%	1.0%	1.0%	0.9%	0.9%	0.9%	0.9%	1.0%	0.9%
2014	1.0%	0.9%	1.1%	1.0%	1.0%	0.8%	1.0%	1.0%	0.9%	0.9%	0.9%	0.9%	▲1.0%
2015	1.0%	0.9%	1.1%	1.0%	1.0%	1.0%	1.2%	1.0%	1.0%	1.0%	1.2%	1.0%	1.0%
2016	1.1%	1.0%	1.1%	1.1%	1.1%	1.1%	1.4%	1.1%	1.1%	1.1%	1.1%	1.2%	▲1.1%
2017	1.2%	1.1%	1.2%	1.2%	1.2%	1.3%	1.3%	1.2%	1.1%	1.1%	1.0%	1.0%	1.1%
2018	1.0%												
