= VOX (German TV channel) =

German television channel

Vox
- Country: Germany
- Broadcast area: Germany; Austria; Switzerland; Europe (pay-TV, free-to-air)
- Affiliates: VOX Austria; VOX CH (Switzerland)
- Headquarters: Cologne, Germany

Programming
- Language: German
- Picture format: 1080i HDTV (downscaled to 16:9 576i for the SDTV feed)

Ownership
- Owner: RTL Group (99.7%); DCTP (0.3%)
- Parent: RTL Deutschland
- Key people: Frank Hoffmann (CEO)
- Sister channels: RTL n-tv Super RTL; RTL Zwei; Nitro; RTLup; VOXup; RTL Crime; RTL Living; RTL Passion; GEO Television

History
- Launched: 25 January 1993; 33 years ago

Links
- Website: www.vox.de/cms/index.html

Availability

Terrestrial
- Digital terrestrial television: Channel numbers vary in each region

Vox is a German free-to-air television channel launched on 25 January 1993 and owned by RTL Group. The channel mainly broadcasts documentaries and American TV shows and movies.

An integral part of the night program is the series Medical Detectives / Forensic Files, which regularly gets very high ratings, sometimes up to 20%, which is rather unusual for the broadcaster.

== History ==
VOX started transmitting on 25 January 1993. It competed with public television by broadcasting many live and informational programmes. The channel was originally owned by an assortment of German media companies:

- UFA (Bertelsmann) – 24.9%
- Westdeutsche Medienbeteiligungsgesellschaft (West German Media Holding Company) – 25.1%
- Holtzbrinck-Verlag (Holtzbrinck Publishing House) – 14.5%
- Warner Music Germany – 14.5%
- Development Company for Television Program (DCTP) – 11%
- Mittelständische Unternehmensbeteiligung (Middle Class Business Holdings) – 10%

The director of programming at launch was Ruprecht Eser. One year after the channel's launch it seemed clear that the original programme concept would not work. Market share among the target group relevant for advertisers was at 1.5%, too low to attract much advertising. VOX took significant losses. By February 1994, all the original partners except UFA and DCTP had sold their stakes. As a result of the losses, the quality of programmes began to decline. VOX had to repeat its movies every few weeks to fill the schedule. On 1 April 1994, VOX went into liquidation. More than 250 employees were laid off.

VOX's logo consists of the letters V and X, with a red circle "eye" using negative space to create the O.

By November 1994 VOX had new owners:

- News German Television Holding (News Corporation) – 49.9%
- Canal+ – 24.9%
- UFA (Bertelsmann) – 24.9%
- DCTP – 0.3%

Gradually, VOX gained a foothold in the German television landscape. In 1998, VOX signed an output deal with 20th Century Fox, leading to more series and movies being broadcast alongside magazine-style shows. In December 1999, RTL Television bought out News Corporation. A short time later, Canal+ sold its share to UFA (Bertelsmann AG). 99.7% of the channel now belonged to RTL Group, with the remaining 0.3% held by DCTP.

The channel's success with CSI and CSI: Miami led to them being transferred to the more widely watched sister channel RTL Television. CSI: NY gets a market share of up to 21% on VOX.

Audience share in March 2008 was 5.4%, with share amongst 14- to 49-year-olds at 7.4%. In the 2011/12 television season, VOX had a 5.6% share of all viewers, making it the sixth-most watched channel, and 7.4% among viewers aged 14–49, making it the fourth-most watched channel by that demographic.

== Logos ==
1993

1994

2001

11 September 2013 – present

== Audience share ==
=== Germany ===
	January	February	March	April	May	June	July	August	September	October	November	December	Annual average
1993	-	-	-	-	-	-	-	-	-	-	-	-	1.3%
1994	-	-	-	-	-	-	-	-	-	-	-	-	▲2.0%
1995	-	-	-	-	-	-	-	-	-	-	-	-	▲2.6%
1996	2.9%	3.1%	3.0%	2.7%	2.8%	2.8%	2.9%	3.3%	3.3%	3.3%	3.1%	3.0%	▲3.0%
1997	3.0%	3.0%	2.9%	2.9%	2.9%	3.1%	3.2%	3.2%	3.1%	3.1%	3.3%	2.9%	3.0%
1998	3.0%	2.8%	2.9%	2.9%	2.7%	2.5%	2.8%	3.1%	3.1%	2.9%	2.8%	2.6%	▼2.8%
1999	2.8%	2.8%	2.6%	2.7%	2.8%	3.0%	3.0%	3.2%	2.8%	2.9%	2.9%	2.7%	2.8%
2000	2.7%	2.7%	2.8%	2.8%	3.0%	2.8%	2.7%	2.9%	2.7%	2.9%	2.9%	2.9%	2.8%
2001	2.9%	2.8%	3.0%	3.2%	3.0%	3.3%	3.2%	3.2%	3.1%	3.1%	3.2%	3.0%	▲3.1%
2002	3.0%	3.0%	3.3%	3.4%	3.4%	3.0%	3.3%	3.3%	3.5%	3.4%	3.5%	3.3%	▲3.3%
2003	3.3%	3.4%	3.3%	3.4%	3.5%	3.6%	3.3%	3.4%	3.5%	3.6%	3.7%	3.5%	▲3.5%
2004	3.3%	3.4%	3.4%	3.9%	3.8%	3.6%	3.7%	3.7%	4.1%	4.1%	3.9%	4.0%	▲3.7%
2005	4.2%	4.3%	4.2%	4.1%	4.2%	4.2%	4.2%	4.3%	4.2%	4.4%	4.3%	4.0%	▲4.2%
2006	4.4%	4.3%	4.6%	4.6%	4.7%	4.1%	4.9%	5.1%	5.3%	5.4%	5.4%	4.9%	▲4.8%
2007	5.3%	5.5%	5.4%	5.5%	5.5%	5.6%	5.7%	5.9%	6.0%	6.2%	6.1%	5.5%	▲5.7%
2008	5.7%	5.7%	5.4%	5.3%	5.2%	4.6%	5.4%	5.2%	5.8%	5.7%	5.3%	4.9%	▼5.4%
2009	5.0%	5.3%	5.3%	5.2%	5.1%	5.4%	5.6%	5.8%	5.8%	5.7%	5.6%	5.6%	5.4%
2010	5.6%	5.4%	6.0%	5.6%	5.8%	5.2%	5.4%	5.8%	6.0%	5.8%	5.6%	5.3%	▲5.6%
2011	5.3%	5.6%	5.4%	5.5%	5.7%	5.7%	5.7%	5.8%	5.7%	5.5%	5.6%	5.3%	5.6%
2012	5.6%	5.7%	5.6%	5.7%	5.7%	5.3%	5.9%	6.1%	6.2%	6.0%	6.0%	5.6%	▲5.8%
2013	5.8%	5.9%	5.9%	5.7%	5.5%	5.6%	5.4%	5.3%	5.6%	5.6%	5.5%	5.2%	▼5.6%
2014	5.1%	4.9%	5.4%	5.5%	5.4%	4.5%	4.8%	5.4%	5.6%	5.5%	5.4%	5.1%	▼5.2%
2015	5.0%	5.1%	4.9%	5.1%	5.2%	4.9%	4.8%	4.9%	5.2%	5.2%	5.2%	5.2%	▼5.1%
2016	4.7%	5.2%	5.2%	5.4%	5.3%	4.6%	5.0%	5.0%	5.6%	5.8%	5.5%	5.1%	▲5.2%
2017	5.0%	5.3%	5.4%	5.1%	5.1%	5.1%	5.1%	5.0%	5.1%	5.2%	5.2%	4.7%	▼5.1%
2018	4.9%	4.8%	5.0%	5.0%	4.6%	4.4%	4.6%	4.5%	4.1%	4.8%			

The average age of the viewers is 48.6 years (as of 2016).
