= RTL (German TV channel) =

German television network

- Country: Germany
- Broadcast area: National; Also distributed in: Austria; Switzerland; Luxembourg; Liechtenstein
- Headquarters: Cologne, Germany

Programming
- Language: German
- Picture format: 2160p UHDTV (downscaled to 1080i and 576i for the HDTV and SDTV feeds respectively)

Ownership
- Owner: RTL Group
- Parent: RTL Deutschland
- Sister channels: VOX n-tv Super RTL; RTL Zwei; Nitro; RTLup; VOXup; RTL Crime; RTL Living; RTL Passion; GEO Television

History
- Launched: 2 January 1984; 42 years ago
- Former names: RTL plus (1984–1992); RTL Television (1992–2004)

Links
- Website: www.rtl.de

Availability

Terrestrial
- Digital terrestrial television: Channel numbers vary

Streaming media
- Ziggo GO (Netherlands): ZiggoGO.tv
- RTL LIVE: RTL; RTL Up; RTL Crime; RTL Passion; RTL Living

RTL (from French: Radio Télévision Luxembourg), formerly RTL plus and RTL Television, is a German-language free-to-air television channel owned by RTL Deutschland, headquartered in Cologne. Founded as an offshoot of the German-language radio programme Radio Luxemburg, RTL is considered a full-service broadcaster under the Medienstaatsvertrag ('Interstate Media Treaty') and is the largest private television network in Germany. As of August 2010, RTL employs some 500 permanent staff, having outsourced its news and technical departments.

In September 2021, Mediengruppe RTL Deutschland ('RTL Germany Media Group') was renamed RTL Deutschland. As part of the rebrand, both the group and the channel received new logos and branding.

== History ==
RTL plus was already known through the radio station. Even before the broadcast began, the pressure on politicians to introduce private television in West Germany was growing in Saarland, which could be reached from the broadcasting systems in Luxembourg. Private television began operations in the West Germany on 1 January 1984 with the two-year Ludwigshafen cable pilot project (Kabelpilotprojekt). It was the birth of PKS (later Sat.1). A day later, RTL plus, which was then broadcasting from Luxembourg and named after the Luxembourg radio and television broadcaster RTL (derived from Radio Télévision Lëtzebuerg, see also RTL Télé Lëtzebuerg), began its German-language program from 5:27 p.m. The unusual broadcast start took place in a small studio in Bertrange with the following scene: Chief doctor Rainer Holbe delivered a television with the RTL-plus logo in a delivery room with his obstetricians. The broadcast times were Monday to Friday from 5:30 p.m. to 10:30 p.m. and Saturday to Sunday from 5:30 p.m. to midnight. The first RTL broadcast after the starting signal was the news 7 vor 7 with Hans Meiser and Geert Müller-Gerbes.

RTL plus was famous in its early years for showing low-budget films and American programmes. In 1988, it was the second most-viewed channel in West Germany.

After German reunification in 1990, broadcasting was extended to the entire country. RTL moved to Cologne and received the right to broadcast on free-to-air frequencies. That same year, RTL acquired the first-run rights to the German Football First Division. Deals with Cannon and Universal Studios finally provided more high-profile films for the channel. In 2012, RTL made a deal with Walt Disney Studios Motion Pictures to air films from its media library until 2016, when it switched to Universal, as Disney Channel was relaunched as a free-to-air channel competing with RTL.

In July 2015, the channel introduced the slogan Willkommen zuhause (Welcome home) to complement Mein RTL, and launched its biggest advertising campaign in 20 years. This tagline (as Willkommen zu Hause, with a space between zu and Hause) was earlier used in the early 2000s.

On 1 September 2017, RTL flattened its logo, with brighter shades of the three colours. The slogan continues to be Willkommen zuhause, through Mein RTL would be used in rare cases. Another sister channel, n-tv was rebranded on the same day.

As part of a comprehensive restructuring within Mediengruppe RTL Deutschland, RTL unveiled a new identity, a new, multi-colourful logo and a new graphics package. The rebrand rolled out on 15 September 2021, as well as RTL Crime, RTL Living and RTL Passion.

== Station logos ==
Logo of RTL plus (1984–1987)

Logo of RTL plus (1987–1992)

Logo of RTL Television (30 October 1992 – 1999)

Logo of RTL (31 August 2008 – 28 August 2014)

Logo of RTL (28 August 2014 – 31 August 2017)

Logo of RTL (1 September 2017 – 14 September 2021)

Logo of RTL (since 15 September 2021)

Logo of RTL HD (since 15 September 2021)

== Audience share ==
=== Germany ===
	January	February	March	April	May	June	July	August	September	October	November	December	Annual average
1985	–	–	–	–	–	–	–	–	–	–	–	–	0.4%
1986	–	–	–	–	–	–	–	–	–	–	–	–	▲0.7%
1987	–	–	–	–	–	–	–	–	–	–	–	–	▲1.2%
1988	–	–	–	–	–	–	–	–	–	–	–	–	▲4.1%
1989	–	–	–	–	–	–	–	–	–	–	–	–	▲10.0%
1990	–	–	–	–	–	–	–	–	–	–	–	–	▲11.5%
1991	–	–	–	–	–	–	–	–	–	–	–	–	▲14.4%
1992	–	–	–	–	–	–	–	–	–	–	–	–	▲16.7%
1993	–	–	–	–	–	–	–	–	–	–	–	–	▲18.9%
1994	–	–	–	–	–	–	–	–	–	–	–	–	▼17.5%
1995	–	–	–	–	–	–	–	–	–	–	–	–	▲17.6%
1996	16.6%	16.6%	18.2%	18.6%	18.1%	15.5%	15.6%	16.7%	17.2%	16.7%	17.4%	16.5%	▼17.0%
1997	15.9%	16.0%	16.4%	17.8%	17.0%	15.9%	14.8%	14.7%	16.9%	16.9%	15.7%	14.9%	▼16.1%
1998	14.2%	14.2%	16.2%	16.2%	15.6%	13.8%	14.4%	15.7%	16.3%	15.1%	15.2%	14.6%	▼15.1%
1999	13.6%	13.9%	15.0%	15.8%	15.9%	15.3%	14.9%	15.3%	15.5%	15.4%	14.3%	13.6%	▼14.8%
2000	14.0%	14.0%	13.8%	14.3%	14.4%	13.7%	14.0%	14.2%	14.0%	14.6%	15.1%	14.7%	▼14.3%
2001	14.3%	13.4%	15.3%	15.9%	16.9%	13.6%	14.3%	13.4%	15.5%	15.4%	14.6%	14.5%	▲14.8%
2002	15.0%	13.2%	14.9%	16.1%	15.2%	12.6%	14.5%	13.2%	15.4%	15.5%	15.2%	14.4%	▼14.6%
2003	15.8%	15.7%	16.0%	15.3%	15.5%	14.3%	13.7%	13.5%	15.5%	14.9%	13.9%	13.8%	▲14.9%
2004	15.2%	13.8%	13.9%	14.1%	14.5%	12.2%	13.1%	12.3%	14.5%	14.4%	14.0%	12.8%	▼13.8%
2005	13.1%	12.5%	12.9%	13.6%	14.1%	13.1%	12.7%	12.3%	14.0%	13.5%	13.5%	12.9%	▼13.2%
2006	13.0%	12.3%	13.4%	12.8%	13.7%	12.8%	12.1%	12.7%	13.0%	13.1%	12.6%	11.9%	▼12.8%
2007	12.6%	12.0%	12.6%	12.8%	12.9%	12.8%	12.4%	11.8%	13.1%	12.9%	12.1%	11.1%	▼12.4%
2008	11.8%	11.5%	11.7%	12.5%	12.4%	9.8%	11.6%	10.5%	12.5%	12.1%	12.9%	11.5%	▼11.7%
2009	12.6%	11.8%	12.4%	12.8%	12.4%	11.6%	11.4%	10.9%	13.3%	13.5%	14.0%	12.9%	▲12.5%
2010	12.7%	12.7%	13.7%	14.0%	13.6%	12.7%	12.5%	12.8%	14.5%	14.8%	15.3%	13.6%	▲13.6%
2011	15.2%	14.1%	13.7%	14.6%	14.9%	12.5%	13.3%	13.2%	14.8%	14.6%	14.3%	13.3%	▲14.1%
2012	14.1%	13.1%	13.4%	12.7%	11.9%	10.6%	11.5%	10.5%	12.7%	12.3%	12.7%	10.8%	▼12.3%
2013	13.1%	11.3%	11.2%	12.1%	11.4%	10.8%	10.9%	10.4%	10.7%	11.7%	11.5%	10.3%	▼11.3%
2014	12.8%	10.4%	10.6%	10.6%	10.6%	8.4%	9.0%	9.0%	10.0%	11.5%	10.7%	9.5%	▼10.3%
2015	11.3%	9.6%	9.8%	9.9%	9.9%	9.7%	9.2%	9.0%	10.6%	10.6%	10.1%	9.1%	▼9.9%
2016	11.7%	10.0%	9.6%	10.0%	9.8%	8.3%	9.0%	8.3%	10.1%	10.4%	10.0%	9.2%	▼9.7%
2017	11.0%	8.8%	9.3%	9.4%	9.5%	9.0%	8.5%	8.5%	9.0%	9.4%	9.0%	8.1%	▼9.2%
2018	9.7%	8.4%	8.5%	8.6%	8.3%	7.5%	7.8%						

As of 2016 the average age of the viewers was 48.9 years.
