= RTL Deutschland =

German media group, a subsidiary of RTL Group

RTL Deutschland GmbH
- Logo used since 2021
- Formerly: Mediengruppe RTL Deutschland (2007–2021)
- Type: Division
- Founded: 2007; 19 years ago
- Headquarters: Cologne, Germany
- Key people: Stephan Schäfer; Matthias Dang (CEOs); Alexander Glatz; Julia Reuter
- Products: Television, broadcasting, content production
- Revenue: ▲€2,127 million (2020)
- Parent: RTL Group
- Divisions: RTL; RTL Zwei (35%); Vox; n-tv; Super RTL
- Website: company.rtl.com/en/business-units/overview/rtl-deutschland/

Alternative logo

Former logo until 13 September 2021

RTL Deutschland (previously Mediengruppe RTL Deutschland) is a German media company based in Cologne, North Rhine-Westphalia. It was founded in 2007 as a holding company for the German television, broadcasting and content production businesses of the RTL Group, which is majority-owned by Bertelsmann.

On 14 June 2021 it was announced that the Mediengruppe RTL Deutschland would be renamed RTL Deutschland in September 2021. In this context, both the company and the broadcaster RTL got new logos and a new design.

== History ==
In 2000, Bertelsmann and Pearson announced that they would merge their television and radio stations and production companies. This created RTL Group, based in Luxembourg, as a leading European media company. RTL's activities in Germany were also affected by this merger; Bertelsmann had gradually increased its stake in the German television broadcaster RTL in the 1990s.

In 2007, television and content businesses in Germany were bundled under the umbrella of Mediengruppe RTL Deutschland. The company introduced a new brand identity and bundled digital competencies.

In 2009, RTL, VOX, N-tv, and other channels moved into a joint broadcasting center in Cologne-Deutz, to achieve synergy effects not only organizationally but also through physical proximity. An example of cooperation between RTL Deutschland companies is the streaming platform RTL+ (originally launched as TV NOW). Initially launched by RTL, other channels were successively added to the service.

In February 2019, RTL Deutschland and their parent company RTL Group announced that they've sold their German film production and distribution company Universum Film to New York-based American global investment firm Kohlberg Kravis Robertsn (KKR) who owns Munich-based German film distribution company Tele Munchen Group and had plans to merge TMG with Universum to create a German entertainment production company.

At Bertelsmann, Mediengruppe RTL Deutschland established further partnerships with other divisions, such as for marketing (Ad Alliance) and content production (Content Alliance).

In 2021, it was announced that Gruner + Jahr and Mediengruppe RTL Deutschland intend to cooperate even more closely in the future.

On 6 August 2021, RTL Deutschland announced their acquisition of Gruner + Jahr for €230 million euros (excluding debt). They aimed to merge Gruner + Jahr (and its "G+J" brand) with RTL Deutschland by the end of 2021. The deal was completed on 1 January 2022 when Gruner + Jahr became a division of RTL Deutschland and was renamed RTL Publishing.

== Businesses ==
RTL Deutschland conceives, produces, and plays out tv content for various platforms. Its focus has traditionally been on broadcast television but its online platforms and those operated by third parties have become increasingly important.

Noteworthy entertainment channels are RTL and VOX, among others. The majority of their programming consists of self-developed formats and in-house productions, supplemented by international series and shows. More than 700 employees work for the entire media group in journalistic functions at 11 German and 15 international locations.

== Operations ==
RTL Deutschland GmbH operates as a limited liability company (Gesellschaft mit beschränkter Haftung). Its corporate purpose essentially extends to looking after the overarching interests of the individual companies, as well as all related activities. The holding generates a large part of its revenues from advertising. In addition, there is revenue from licenses for content conceived and produced on behalf of third parties; subscriptions to offerings such as TVNOW account for another share.
