= Big Brother 2022 (Dutch and Belgian TV series) =

- Season 2
- Presented by: Geraldine Kemper; Peter Van de Veire
- No. of days: 86
- No. of housemates: 16
- Winner: Salar Abassi Abrassi
- Runner-up: Grace Rodrigues
- No. of episodes: 72

Release
- Original network: Netherlands; RTL 5; RTL 4 (Premiere); Belgium; Play4
- Original release: 3 January – 26 March 2022

Season chronology
- ← Previous; Series 2021 Next → Series 2023

Big Brother 2022 is the second cooperation season of the Dutch and Belgian version of Big Brother. It is the eight regular version of Big Brother in both Belgium and the Netherlands. The show is broadcast on RTL 5 in the Netherlands and Play4 in Belgium beginning on 3 January 2022. Live streams are available 24/7 on Videoland for Dutch viewers and on GoPlay.be and Telenet for Belgian viewers.

During the final of Big Brother 2021 the hosts already hinted Big Brother could return. Afterwards producers told they were researching the possibility of a sequel. On 29 June 2021, there was an announcement of the new season and a call for new housemates. The start and concept of the season was revealed at November 2021.

Geraldine Kemper and Peter Van de Veire return as co-hosts of the show. The house of the previous season remained but was completely restyled. The gameroom was extended and a shop added. The season was announced to be harder, more exciting and unexpected compared to the other season. The season was again plagued by the consequences of the COVID-19 pandemic: there was no live audience, housemates were tested, quarantined and Kemper was due to illness replaced for a few weeks by Bridget Maasland.

The eight first housemates arrived at New Year's Eve 2021. The first episode aired on 3 January 2022. The ratings of the launch dropped considerably compared to the previous revival season. The start had 586.000 viewers in the Netherlands at both RTL 4 & RTL 5, a drop of 56%, and 376.510 viewers at the Belgian Play4. The season got attention when Big Brother gave a warning racistic, discriminating and sexistic remarks or behaviour aren't tolerated and reminded the housemates about the zero tolerance. Housemate Nawel Seghairi was nominated eight times in a row by almost only male housemates. She gained a large fanbase outside but was eventually voted out close to the final. Many viewers protested against Kristof Timmermans winning a golden key to the final, more than two weeks for the final, saying the twist was fixed. The broadcasters denied Timmermans was being protected.

The final was on 26 March 2022 and the winner was Salar Abassi Abraasi who won the jackpot of €69,815. The final was watched by 295.000 viewers in the Netherlands and 208.449 viewers in Belgium.

== Production ==
=== Format ===
Big Brother 2022 followed the same format as the previous season of the program. Housemates lived in isolation from the outside world in a custom-built house for a period of 100 days, hoping to be the last one to leave the house as the winner, and walk away with a large cash prize.

==== Concept ====
Producers of the reality show stated this season would be harder compared to the previous season, responding to complaints during the previous season. A promo was released showing the public being able to change the water temperature and moving the walls. This was not the case. However week themes were added, warm water was limited and the house did become smaller when it was divided in two.

=== Broadcasts ===
The first episode was pre-recorded on the evening of 31 December 2021 and simultaneously broadcast on RTL 4 and RTL 5 in the Netherlands, Play4 on Belgium on 3 January 2022. The Daily show aired from Monday to Friday with the live show on Saturday night.

== Housemates ==
Name	Age	Occupation	Country	Residence	Day entered	Day exited	Status
Salar Abassi Abrassi	27	Entrepreneur	Netherlands	Assendelft	4	86	Winner
Grace Rodrigues	35	Unemployed	Netherlands	Breda	1	86	Runner-up
Kristof Timmermans	30	Geography teacher and singer	Belgium	Stabroek	2	86	3rd place
Nouchine Broodhaers	25	Home nurse	Belgium	Ghent	1	83	Evicted
Tobias van Veen	26	Lifestyle and personal coach	Netherlands	The Hague	1	79	Evicted
Nawel Seghairi	26	PMU artist and TikTok star	Belgium	Eeklo	4	72	Evicted
Julio Neves Dias	43	Team coach	Netherlands	Hoogerheide	17	65	Evicted
Hanne Ioculano	36	Cytology analyst	Belgium	Genk	17	58	Evicted
Leroy de Rouw	31	Barber	Netherlands	's-Hertogenbosch	17	51	Evicted
Vera Dijkstra	26	Perfumery worker	Netherlands	Vlissingen	1	51	Evicted
Peter Trippaers	56	Shoe salesman	Belgium	Hasselt	1	44	Evicted
Dimitri Rodaro	26	Commercial Director	Belgium	Kampenhout	1	37	Evicted
Eveline Gerits	38	Casino Employee	Netherlands	Gennep	13	30	Evicted
Amy Van Wingen	27	Digital Performance Marketer	Belgium	Ghent	13	23	Evicted
Kitty Mager	58	Fulltime volunteer	Netherlands	Aalten	1	16	Evicted
Sercan Sevil	28	Warehouse worker	Belgium	Tessenderlo	1	9	Evicted

== Twists ==
=== Prize money ===
Like the previous season, housemates were required to do several tasks every week. These tasks were known as "secret mission", "challenge" or "weekly tasks". If the housemate(s) completed, they earned prize money for the seasons winner.

	Current total amount	Task	Worth	Result	Increased/decreased
Week 1	€0 (Initial)	Balancing balls.	€ 1,800	Yes	+€1,800
Week 1	€0 (Initial)	Secret mission Salar & Nawel	€2,500	Yes	+€2,500
Week 3	€4,300	Counting up to 1000 after pressing red button, Kristof	€ 1,000	Yes	+€1,000
Week 3	€4,300	Secret mission Kristof (bathrobes)	€1,000	Yes	+€1,000
Week 3	€4,300	Counting birds	€10,000	Maybe	+ €6,608
Week 3	€4,300	Fine for helping Peter wash dishes	€500	No	-€500
Week 3	€4,300	Dimitri and Tobias make "deaf" and "blind" lunch	€200	Yes	+ €200
Week 4	€12,608	Hanging from ropes (house vs. house)	€1,419	Yes	+€1.419
Week 5	€14,027	Ranking the House	€ 500	Yes	+€500
Week 5	€14,027	Ping pong ball game	€6,000	Yes	+€6,000
Week 5	€14,027	Ranking the House II	€250	Yes	+ €250
Week 5	€14,027	Walking over lego bricks and reading codes, Leroy	€2,750	Yes	+ €2,750
Week 6	€23,527	Choice game around reliability, Leroy chose the pin	€ 5,000	Yes	+€5,000
Week 6	€23,527	Spell words or Salar "electrocute"	€ 3,250	Yes	+€3,250
Week 6	€23,527	Water cylinder filling and Hanne in slime bath	€2,000	Yes	+ €2,000
Week 7	€33,777	Dance Marathon	€ 1,500	Yes	+€1,500
Week 7	€33,777	Ping pong ball game	€ 1,200	Yes	+€1,200
Week 8	€36,477	Shooting for a pin or the pot	€ 3,575	Yes	+€3,575
Week 8	€36,477	Twitter game with the viewer	€ 9,000	Yes	+€9,000
Week 9	€49,052	Packing game (with Rewind token)	€ 745	Yes	+€745
Week 9	€49,052	Secret mission Julio and Tobias	€ 1,000	No	-€1,000
Week 10	€48,797	Extra vote, Nawel	€ 1,500	No	-€1,500
Week 10	€48,797	Secret mission Salar, using Dago's voice	€ 2,500	Yes	+€2,500
Week 10	€48,797	Hourglass and screen with video message loved ones	€ 909	Yes	+€909
Week 10	€48,797	Money pressure game	€ 10,000	Maybe	+€5,500
Week 11	€56,206	Keep plateaus with bags of sand high	€ 2,360	Yes	+€2,360
Week 11	€56,206	Fairground game	€ 1,990	Yes	+€1,990
Week 12	€60,556	Tennis game with former housemates	€ 990	Yes	+€990
Week 12	€60,556	Several 60-second games	€ 5,180	Yes	+€5,180
Total	€ 66,726				

=== Little Brother ===
New this season was the title Little Brother. Housemates could win this title through a challenge. The housemate who was Little Brother had automatic immunity, but was also given extra responsibility. For example, this resident could sometimes give immunity to a fellow housemate, or save one of the nominated housemates. Or if this was not possible, this Little brother-housemate got an extra nomination vote.

=== Immunity pin ===
Housemates who had immunity wore a silver immunity pin.

== Weekly summary ==
The main events in the Big Brother house are summarised in the table below.

Week 1
Week 1	Entrances	On Day 1, Grace and Peter entered the house before the others.; On Day 1, Dimitri, Kitty, Nouchine, Sercan, Tobias & Vera.; On Day 3, Kristof entered the house at midnight.; On Day 4, Nawel & Salar entered the Datacenter.; On Day 5, Nawel & Salar joined the other housemates in the house.
Week 1	Theme	Back to basics: the housemates had to leave their luggage, there was limited warm water and limited food.
Week 1	Twist	On Day 4, the Datecenter was revealed. A hidden room where the occupants could watch the house and its housemates secretly.
Week 1	Tasks	On Day 1, first housemates Grace & Peter had to take 8 objects that would be helpful in the house from a conveyor-belt. 3 of the objects they chose was Graces luggage, Peters luggages and Graces suitcase.; On Day 1, Dimitri & Kitty had to choose clothes and objects out of the luggage of all housemates, which had to fit in a tiny suitcase. They had 20 minutes to do this.; On Day 2, the housemates had to play the hunger game in duos. Each housemate could choose for their own luggage or shopping money. If both housemates chose for the shopping money, they received 15 euro.; On Day 2, secret new housemate Kristof got the task to go to the shop and buy with the earned money.; On Day 3, the housemates had to do a balancing task and bring balls to the other side.; On Day 4, secret new housemates Nawel & Salar got the task to observe the other housemates from the Datacenter.; On Day 5, Nawel & Salar heard they had to nominate two housemates and had to keep this secret for the other housemates.
Week 1	Nominations	On Day 7, Kristof & Sercan received were nominated by Nawel & Salar and faced the public vote.
Week 1	Exits	On Day 9, Sercan became the first housemate to be evicted.
Week 2
Week 2	Theme	Survivor: all housemates were automatically nominated and could win immunity by winning a task.
Week 2	The public decides	On Day 9: the public could decide which housemates would do the shopping. They chose Kitty.; On Day 11: the public could decide the order in which the housemates had to play the game for immunity.; On Day 12: the public could decide who of the following housemates would receive immunity: Dimitri, Kitty, Peter or Vera. They chose Dimitri who got immunity on day 13.
Week 2	Highlights	On Day 12, Dimitri & Vera shared a kiss.; On Day 14, the housemates with immunity had to give the last immunity to one of the remaining nominated housemates Kitty, Peter or Vera. They gave the immunity to Vera.; On Day 15, Kitty got informed that her father died. She knew this could happen, discussed and prepared this with her family before her stay in the house and got the advice from her mother to go ahead with this - the Big Brother participation - because it was the first time Kitty did something for herself. Kitty decided to stay and informed the other housemates.
Week 2	Tasks	On Day 10, the housemates had to do an endurance task in duos. They had to hold on a rope. Nawel & Tobias won and received immunity.; On Day 11, the housemates had to play the hunger game. Catching money or one immunity bill falling at certain times from a tree.; On Day 11, Nawel and Tobias got the hidden task. They had to choose one housemates who they wanted immunity and were able to direct that housemate to be standing under the money tree at the exact time the immunity bill would fall. They chose Nouchine. She didn't succeed. It was Kristof who caught the immunity bill.; On Day 12, the house was filled with balloons. The last one finding a ticket in the balloon won immunity. This was Grace.; On Day 12, the still nominated housemates - Dimitri, Kitty, Peter, Nouchine, Salar and Vera - had to play a velcro toss game. Each housemate who would have 3 balls attached to his velcro helmet, would stay nominated. This were Dimitri, Kitty, Peter and Vera. Nouchine and Salar won immunity.; On Day 13, new housemates Amy & Eveline had to collect clothes from each housemates' wish list in the luggage room and keep the weight under 2 kg/housemate.
Week 2	Entrances	On Day 13, Amy & Eveline entered the house.
Week 2	Nominations	On Day 14, Kitty & Peter didn't win immunity, stayed nominated and faced the public vote.
Week 2	Exits	On Day 16, Kitty became the second housemate to be evicted.
Week 3
Week 3	Theme	Surprise: each time one of the housemates would push the red button, something positive or negative would happen.
Week 3	The public decides	On Day 16, the public could decide what positive consequence there would be for the housemate pushing the red button: 30 minutes more warm water, immunity or receiving his luggage. The public voted for the luggage.; On Day 20, the public could decide which housemate would receive his luggage. The public voted for Tobias.
Week 3	Entrances	On Day 17, Leroy entered the house. The same day Hanne & Julio entered the house also.
Week 3	Little Brother	On Day 18, Nouchine became the first caretaker. She bought immunity in the mini mall and gave this to Nawel.
Week 3	The red button	On Day 16, Amy pushed the button. They heard the voices of three new housemates.; On Day 17, Kristof pushed the button. The consequence was that Nawel got informed of the birth of her niece three days before.; On Day 17, Kristof pushed the button. He had to decide which one of the three new housemates to enter the house immediately. He chose Julio.; On Day 17, Kristof pushed the button. He had to count to 1.000 and had three chances. He earned 1.000 euro.; On Day 17, Salar pushed the button. He could give one housemate his luggage back. He chose himself.; On Day 18, Nouchine pushed the button. She became caretaker and won immunity.; On Day 18, Peter pushed the button. The consequence was he had to do the washing alone for the rest of the week.; On Day 18, Tobias pushed the button. He had to clean all the sheets of all beds alone.; On Day 19, Peter pushed the button. More birds are printed in the storage room and to be counted.; On Day 19, Amy pushed the button. She had to make origami swans in the game room.; On Day 20, Dimitri pushed the button. He could choose one housemate which would receive his luggage. He chose Nouchine.; On Day 20, Leroy pushed the button. He could choose the ingredients for a BBQ, coffee or spices. He chose coffee.; On Day 21, Tobias pushed the button. He, wearing eaf ears, and Dimitri, wearing blind glasses, had to prepare lunch without help from the other housemates. They earned 200 euro for the group budget.; On Day 21, Vera pushed the button. All housemates had to name a music number in the diary room. Eveline & Nouchine had to recognize the taste of all kind of chips. Seven guesses were right. They won a party.
Week 3	Tasks	On Day 18, new housemates Hanne & Leroy had to play the hunger game. They had to keep the water in watertanks with their finger. Hanne won 135 euro. Because Leroy didn't succeed, he had to return his luggage and immunity pin to Big Brother.; On Day 18, Kristof got the hidden task to collect all bathrobes. He succeeded and won 1.000 euro.; On Day 19, the house was filled with all kind of birds who the housemates had to count. They counted 6.608 birds. There were 6.973 but there was a margin of error of 500. They earned 6.608 euro.
Week 3	Punishments	On Day 19, 500 euro was taken from the group budget because housemates helped Peter with washing.
Week 3	Nominations	On Day 20, Amy, Eveline and Leroy received the most nominations. They faced the public vote.
Week 3	Exits	On Day 23, Leroy was saved first by the public. Amy became the third housemate to be evicted.
Week 4
Week 4	Theme	Breakup: the house was split in two houses. Team Green was Eveline, Julio, Kristof, Nawel, Peter and Vera. Team Gold was Dimitri, Grace, Hanne, Leroy, Nouchine and Tobias. Salar could decide which team he wanted to be part of since he pushed the red button for the last time. He chose Team Gold.
Week 4	The public decides	On Day 23, the public could decide which housemate would receive a wellness moment. This was given to Grace.
Week 4	Highlights	On Day 24, the housemates woke up in a house split by one big wall throughout the whole house for breakup-week.; On Day 27, Team Gold won immunity by winning the most house vs house-games.; On Day 27, Vera received the news her grandfather had died.; On Day 28, the wall has disappeared. It's the end of the breakup. The housemates are reunited.; On Day 29, Tobias hurts his ankle during sporting. He leaves the house to be taken to a hospital.
Week 4	Tasks	On Day 24, the housemates had to play against each other in the teams they were divided in for luxury. Team Green could win access to the sauna. Team Gold could win access to the hottub. The game was throwing a ball over the wall to the other side. If the other team caught the ball, that team gained a point, and vice versa. Team Green won.; On Day 24, the teams had to combat each other. Half of the housemates had to be targets and the other half snipers. The snipers were blinded. The targets had to slip into the other part of the house and make it to the Diary Room without being shot by one of the snipers of the other team. Making it to the Diary Room, was rewarded by a package food. Three targets of both teams made it to the Diary Room.; On Day 25, the first house vs house-game. It was a tug of war. The price was unlimited hot water. Team Gold won.; On Day 26, the second house vs house-game. Each team had to select two housemates which they had to keep in the air by pulling at a cable. Team Gold won and received a bbq.; On Day 27, the third house vs house-game. Each team had to tape one of their teammates against the wall with ducttape. Team Gold selected Hanne and Team Green selected Nawel. After almost an hour, the task was made more difficult. Hanne and Nawel had to keep an apple in their mouth. After 1 hour 29 minutes Big Brother decided to end the task for the safety of Hanne and Nawel. Big Brother complemted their perseverance. Both teams won and received a mini party.
Week 4	Warning	On Day 27, Big Brother gave his housemates a warning for racist, discriminating and sexistic language. Viewers had complained the previous days about the language of Dimitri about the black toothpaste.
Week 4	Nominations	On Day 27, Eveline, Julio and Nawel received the most nominations. They faced the public vote.
Week 4	Exits	On Day 30, Julio was saved first by the public. Eveline became the fourth housemate to be evicted.
Week 5
Week 5	Theme	Judgement week: the housemates are confronted with the opinion of the viewers.
Week 5	The public decides	On Day 30, the public could decide which housemate is the most useful and make a ranking.; On Day 31, the public could decide again which housemate is the most useful and make a ranking.
Week 5	Tasks	On Day 30, the housemates had to rank themselves on usefulness. The day after this was compared with the ranking of the viewer. For each housemate that had the same place at the ranking of the housemates compared to the ranking of the viewer, the housemates received 250 euro for the jackpot. Only two housemates had the same positions at the rankings: Tobias at place 3 and Dimitri at place 8. The housemates won 500 euro.; On Day 31, the housemates played a game for the jackpot. They were divided in teams. One of each time had to collect balls in the garden, the other half had to slide those balls into little buckets in the game room.; On Day 31, the housemates had to sit on a pole in teams to win warm water.; On Day 32, the housemates played the hunger-game. They had to melt an ice cube to obtain the money inside the cube. Kristof took the golden ball inside the cube and could do the shopping.; On Day 34, Little Brother Leroy played a game for the jackpot. He had to walk barefoot over a line with Lego bricks. Every time he did this he could decide which messages of Twitter about the housemates would be shown at the other housemates in the living room.
Week 5	Judgements	On Day 31, the housemates got to see the ranking they gave each other for usefulness.; On Day 32, the housemates got to see the ranking the public gave them for usefulness.; On Day 34, the housemates got to see messages of Twitter about them.
Week 5	Highlights	On Day 31, Peter received a letter from his husband for their 20th anniversary.; On Day 33, Grace and Hanne received each a letter from their child for their birthday.
Week 5	Little Brother	On Day 33, Dimitri, Leroy, Nawel, Salar and Vera could play a game to become Little Brother, because they had the lowest ranking of the viewer. They had to match objects and their smell. Leroy won and became Little Brother.
Week 5	Nominations	On Day 34, Dimitri, Nawel and Salar received the most nominations. They faced the public vote.
Week 5	Entrance	On Day 34, Tobias returned to the house.
Week 5	Exits	On Day 37, Nawel was saved first by the public. Dimitri became the fifth housemate to be evicted.
Week 6
Week 6	Theme	Hell week: the housemates are confronted with horrific conditions. There was no warm water and no heating. Housemates could earn wooden blocks by sitting 5 minutes in a bathtub with ice water and earn warm water by doing salto's in a hanging chair. A scary clown stole food in the morning of day 38.
Week 6	The public decides	On Day 38, the public could decide which housemate would be confronted with its biggest fear. It was Vera who was confronted on Day 42 with footage of the scary clown in the house.
Week 6	Warning	On Day 38, Leroy got a warning from Big Brother for peeking while female housemates were showering and touching his private parts afterwards. Leroy said he couldn't see anything and that he was washing his private parts.
Week 6	Tasks	On Day 38, housemates had to carry bags with 10% of their body weight. If the bags would touch the floor, the jackpot would lose 100 euro. The housemates succeeded and earned the potatoes in the bags.; On Day 39, housemates played the hunger-game. They had to work in duos. One being blinded and the other seeing colored words of color on a screen. The one being blinded had to remember the colors being shown.; On Day 40, housemates played a game for the jackpot. They had to spell words. For every wrong spelled word they had to electrocute Salar who sat in an electric chair, and still earn the money. This was a hidden task for Salar since it wasn't a real electric chair.; On Day 41, housemates played a game for the jackpot. All housemates were chained. They could free themselves and earn money for the jackpot, or take the immunity pin and stop the game. Hanne, Nawel, Peter and Tobias were the first ones and unchained themselves. Leroy was the next one and took the immunity. They earned 5.000 euros.; On Day 42, housemates played a game for the jackpot. They had to bring water into a tube using clothes only while Hanne had to take bathtub with slime in the gameroom.
Week 6	Highlight	On Day 38, Big Brother revealed the most reliable housemate - according to the housemates - is Tobias. The least reliable is Kristof.; On Day 39, Leroy took the immunity pin during a game, increasing the jackpot with 5.000 euro by doing so.; On Day 40, Peter did the shopping. He said to the other housemates he bought three immunity pins which was a prank. Following this prank, Leroy took an immunity pin during a jackpot game the next day, which turned into a discussion about the prank.
Week 6	Nominations	On Day 40, Nawel, Peter and Salar received the most nominations. They faced the public vote.
Week 6	Exits	On Day 44, Salar was saved first by the public. Peter became the sixth housemate to be evicted.
Week 7
Week 7	Theme	Love week: celebrating Valentine, the house was filled with love.
Week 7	The public decides	On Day 44, the public could decide which housemate they would nominate.; On Day 48, the public could decide what objects would be in the shopping mall next week.; On Day 50, the public could decide which music would be played at the saturday party.
Week 7	Highlight	On Day 44, all housemates except Vera received letters from family for Valentine. Vera received a video message and rose from ex-housemate Dimitri.; On Day 45, all housemates received letters and gifts from viewers for Valentine.; On Day 49, housemates received more letters from their relatives.
Week 7	Little Brother	On Day 45, a relative from each housemate fought to keep the needle from their balloon the longest. The housemate of the relative that won, became Big Brother. This was Salar.
Week 7	Tasks	On Day 46, Little Brother Salar had to recognize his housemates and his relative dresses in animal costumes. He won a meeting behind a glass wall with his friend.; On Day 46, housemates played the hunger-game. Each housemate had to bring a plate with a glass of wine to the gameroom while being electrocuted. Each housemate would win food made by their relatives. Except Julio, Leroy and Nawel all housemates succeeded and won the food.; On Day 47, housemates had to do a ten hour long dance marathon in couples. They won money for the jackpot.; On Day 47, housemates had to compete in duos and bring balls by only using their face to a bucket. They had to throw balls from that bucket to another bucket. Each duo having 4 balls in the last bucket won 400 euro for the jackpot.
Week 7	Nominations	On Day 48, Kristof, Leroy, Nawel, Salar and Vera received the most nominations of the public. Little Brother Salar had immunity and saved Kristof. Leroy, Nawel and Vera faced the public vote.
Week 7	Exits	On Day 51, Nawel was saved by the public. Leroy & Vera became the seventh and eight housemates to be evicted.
Week 8
Week 8	Theme	Viewers' week
Week 8	The public decides	On Day 51, the public could decide which housemate had to be painted. This was Salar.; On Day 52, the public could decide which housemate painted the most beautiful painting. This was Grace.; On Day 52, the public could decide which four housemates had to do a challenge. The housemate that won, won immunity. The housemate that was the first to lose, would be nominated.
Week 8	Highlight	On Day 51, it was Nawels 27th birthday. She received a party. Her family and friends were partying in the gameroom but she couldn't join them.
Week 8	Little Brother	On Day 52, Grace became the new Little Brother by receiving the most public votes for her painting.
Week 8	Tasks	On Day 53, Nawel, Nouchine, Salar and Tobias were chosen by the public to play a game without letting the balls touch the ground. Nawel lost first and was nominated automatically by doing so. Salar won and won immunity.; On Day 53, Grace and Kristof had to do hidden tasks the following days. They had to make all the housemates act like a chicken, use all the hot water supply before midday, hide the hairspray of all housemates, and arrange that the hottub was used the whole time by only two housemates. They succeeded in the first two tasks, and failed the last two. They earned 1000 euro but could buy immunity. They bought this for Kristof.; On Day 54, Hanne, Kristof, Leroy, Nouchine and Tobias played a game for the jackpot and immunity. They had to lay down and shoot at the targets in the game room. Little Brother Grace could direct them. She gave Tobias 3 chances for immunity, Kristof & Nouchine 1 chance and Hanne & Leroy no chance. Tobias won immunity.; On Day 55, Hanne, Leroy & Nouchine played the viewers' game. They had to open red and black boxes with guidelines from Twitter viewers. They could win jackpot money or a double nomination. The viewers guided the three housemates to the money.
Week 8	Nominations	On Day 55, Hanne received the most nominations. Nawel was nominated automatically because of losing a task. Hanne & Nawel faced the public vote.
Week 8	Exits	On Day 58, Hanne became the ninth housemate to be evicted.
Week 9
Week 9	Theme	Decision week
Week 9	Little Brother	On Day 59, each housemate had to hold a large heavy ball. The one holding it for the longest, became Little Brother. This was Salar.
Week 9	Highlights	On Day 61, Little Brother bought the mystery box. He could choose between personal belongings of each housemate of an immunity pin. He took the immunity pin and gave it to Nouchine.; On Day 63, the housemates had to clean the house for the spring cleaning. They were rewarded with a BBQ.; On Day 64, a plane flew over the house and garden with a banner displaying 'Queen Nawel, we got your back'.
Week 9	Tasks	On Day 58, all housemates had to choose the two housemates they trusted the most. These were Julio & Tobias.; On Day 59, all housemates did the shopping task. They had to ride bicylcles and could spin a big wheel with one housemate on it after a given distance.; On Day 60, Julio and Tobias left the house to go the Datacenter. They received a hidden task. They had to put money on each housemate: going from 10.000+ to 5.000- for the jackpot. They put the 10.000 tag on Nawel meaning if she was evicted the next Live Show, the jackpot would receive 10.000. They returned to the house on day 61.; On Day 62, the housemates played the jackpot game. They were divided in three groups: the one with immunity (Nouchine & Salar), the nominated ones (Kristof & Nawel) and the others (Grace, Julio & Tobias). The first group was in the game room blinded and had to drive a toy car to gift boxes with the inside displayed. The second group was in the shopping room and could see and communicate with both other groups and group 3 who had to take gift boxes. There were boxes that gave and took money from the jackpot and a rewind token that undid the nominations.; On Day 62, Kristof & Nawel could give a pleading to the other housemates to not nominate them again.
Week 9	Nominations	On Day 61, Kristof & Nawel received the most nominations. Those nominations were undone by the rewind token on day 62.; On Day 63, Julio, Kristof & Nawel received the most nominations. Little Brother Salar saved Kristof. Julio & Nawel faced the public vote.
Week 9	Exits	On Day 65, Julio became the tenth housemate to be evicted.
Week 10
Week 10	Theme	Running out of time week
Week 10	Little Brother	On Day 66, Grace became Little Brother. She couldn't give immunity to another housemate but she received an extra nomination vote.
Week 10	Tasks	On Day 66, housemates had to catch as much as possible mousetraps. Grace won and became Big Brother.; On Day 67, Salar had to play a hidden task and had to call Nouchine pretending he was her boyfriend, using recorded voice messages. Nouchine believed it was her boyfriend and Salar won money for the jackpot.; On Day 68, Grace, Nawel and Salar played a game in the gameroom. They could choose between watching a message from their family or only listening and getting money for the jackpot. Grace and Salar watched the recorded video messages. Nawel only listened and won money.; On Day 69, housemates played a game for the jackpot, filling water and printing money.
Week 10	Highlights	On Day 65, there was a white party. Housemates wore a helmet with a glass filled with red wine. The housemate who kept his glas the longest full, won. This was Nawel. She won an extra nomination.; On Day 66, it was announced housemates could buy an extra nomination vote for 1500 euro. Nawel bought one.; On Day 66, the women went to the datacenter for a ladies night.; On Day 69, it was Tobias' birthday.; On Day 69, Kristof & Salar played a game in the gameroom. They could choose between money or the golden key. Salar chose the money, 3.100 euro for himself. Kristof got the golden key, making him the first finalist.; On Day 71, nominated Nawel & Salar answered questions of viewers in the gameroom about their time in the house.
Week 10	Nominations	On Day 70, Grace, Nawel & Salar received the most nominations. Little Brother Grace saved herself. Nawel & Salar faced the public vote.
Week 10	Exits	On Day 72, Nawel became the eleventh housemate to be evicted.
Week 11
Week 11	Theme	Back to reality
Week 11	Highlights	On Day 72, Big Brother announced that by Nawel leaving the house, Nouchine was the second finalist since the final would be played by two belgian and two dutch housemates.; On Day 73, housemates received a journal and news from the outside world.; On Day 75, Grace, Salar and Tobias had to give a plea to the viewers to help them getting to the final.; On Day 75, Kristof & Nouchine could name one of the three remaining dutch housemates for the final week. They chose Salar.; On Day 75, the housemates could phone home.; On Day 78, Grace & Tobias had a private and last dinner together in the gameroom.
Week 11	Tasks	On Day 73, the housemates played a game their loved ones played before. Housemates had to do better in order to win money.; On Day 73, the housemates played a fake news quiz for shopping budget.; On Day 75, the housemates had to build a marble run through the house for jackpot money. They failed.
Week 11	Nominations	On Day 76, Grace & Tobias were automatically nominated being the only housemates not placed in the final week. They faced the public vote.
Week 11	Exits	On Day 79, Tobias became the twelfth housemate to be evicted.
Week 12
Week 12	Theme	Final week
Week 12	Highlights	On Day 79, the final housemates are notified that the season won't last 100 days but that it was their final week.; On Day 80, ex-housemate Kitty returned to the house to cook.; On Day 80, ex-housemates Hanne & Julio returned to the house to play a game.; On Day 80, ex-housemate Peter returned to the house as part of the mystery box bought in the shopping maill.; On Day 80, ex-housemate Dimitri returned to the house for a party.; On Day 80, the final housemates had a karaoke party with the returned housemates.; On Day 81, all ex-housemates left the house for the last time.; On Day 82, the housemates of the final week had a press conference with their fans.; On Day 83, Nouchine pushed the red button. Each housemate could do an individual last task for jackpot money in 60 seconds. Grace, Kristof and Nouchine succeeded.
Week 12	Tasks	On Day 79, the housemates had to play a carnival game in the gameroom for the jackpot.; On Day 80, Hanne & Julio played the game for the shopping budget. It was a pingpong game.; On Day 82, the housemates play the final jackpot game. They played this in duo. Grace & Kristof had to bring a ball to red stips. They failed. Nouchine & Salar had to play a game with a key and the same game as the other duo. Only Salar succeeded.
Week 12	Nominations	On Day 79, Grace, Nouchine & Salar were automatically nominated being the only housemates not placed in the final. They faced the public vote.; On Day 83, the three remaining housemates faced the public vote to win.
Week 12	Exits	On Day 83, Nouchine became the thirteenth and last housemate to be evicted.; On Day 86, Kristof left the House as the third placer. Salar was announced as the winner, leaving Grace as the second place

== Episodes ==
No. overall	No. in season	Title	Day(s)	Original release date
Week 1 - Back to basics week
83	1	"Episode 1 - Launch"	Day 1–2	January 3, 2022
84	2	"Episode 2"	Day 2-3	January 4, 2022
85	3	"Episode 3"	Day 3-4	January 5, 2022
86	4	"Episode 4"	Day 4-6	January 6, 2022
87	5	"Episode 5"	Day 6-7	January 7, 2022
88	6	"Episode 6"	Day 7-9 & Live Show 1	January 8, 2022
Week 2 - Survivor week
89	7	"Episode 7"	Day 9-10	January 10, 2022
90	8	"Episode 8"	Day 10-11	January 11, 2022
91	9	"Episode 9"	Day 11-12	January 12, 2022
92	10	"Episode 10"	Day 12-13	January 13, 2022
93	11	"Episode 11"	Day 13-14	January 14, 2022
94	12	"Episode 12"	Day 14-16 & Live Show 2	January 15, 2022
Week 3 - Surprise week
95	13	"Episode 13"	Day 16-17	January 17, 2022
96	14	"Episode 18"	Day 17-18	January 18, 2022
97	15	"Episode 15"	Day 18-19	January 19, 2022
98	16	"Episode 16"	Day 19-20	January 20, 2022
99	17	"Episode 17"	Day 20-21	January 21, 2022
100	18	"Episode 18"	Day 21-23 & Live Show 3	January 22, 2022
Week 4 - Breakup week
101	19	"Episode 19"	Day 23-24	January 24, 2022
102	20	"Episode 20"	Day 24-25	January 25, 2022
103	21	"Episode 21"	Day 25-26	January 26, 2022
104	22	"Episode 22"	Day 26-27	January 27, 2022
105	23	"Episode 23"	Day 27-28	January 28, 2022
106	24	"Episode 24"	Day 28-30 & Live Show 4	January 29, 2022
Week 5 - Judgement week
107	25	"Episode 25"	Day 30-31	January 31, 2022
108	26	"Episode 26"	Day 31-32	February 1, 2022
109	27	"Episode 27"	Day 32-33	February 2, 2022
110	28	"Episode 28"	Day 33-34	February 3, 2022
111	29	"Episode 29"	Day 34-35	February 4, 2022
112	30	"Episode 30"	Day 35-37 & Live Show 5	February 5, 2022
Week 6 - Hell week
113	31	"Episode 31"	Day 37-38	February 7, 2022
114	32	"Episode 32"	Day 38-39	February 8, 2022
115	33	"Episode 33"	Day 39-40	February 9, 2022
116	34	"Episode 34"	Day 40-41	February 10, 2022
117	35	"Episode 35"	Day 41-42	February 11, 2022
118	36	"Episode 36"	Day 42-44 & Live Show 6	February 12, 2022
Week 7 - Love week
119	37	"Episode 37"	Day 44-45	February 14, 2022
120	38	"Episode 38"	Day 45-46	February 15, 2022
121	39	"Episode 39"	Day 46-47	February 16, 2022
122	40	"Episode 40"	Day 47-48	February 17, 2022
123	41	"Episode 41"	Day 48-49	February 18, 2022
124	42	"Episode 42"	Day 49-51 & Live Show 7	February 19, 2022
Week 8 - Viewers' week
125	43	"Episode 43"	Day 51-52	February 21, 2022
126	44	"Episode 44"	Day 52-53	February 22, 2022
127	45	"Episode 45"	Day 53-54	February 23, 2022
128	46	"Episode 46"	Day 54-55	February 24, 2022
129	47	"Episode 47"	Day 55-56	February 25, 2022
130	48	"Episode 48"	Day 56-58 & Live Show 8	February 26, 2022
Week 9 - Decision week
131	49	"Episode 49"	Day 58-59	February 28, 2022
132	50	"Episode 50"	Day 59-60	March 1, 2022
133	51	"Episode 51"	Day 60-61	March 2, 2022
134	52	"Episode 52"	Day 61-62	March 3, 2022
135	53	"Episode 53"	Day 62-63	March 4, 2022
136	54	"Episode 54"	Day 63-65 & Live Show 9	March 5, 2022
Week 10 - Running out of time week
137	55	"Episode 55"	Day 65-66	March 7, 2022
138	56	"Episode 56"	Day 66-67	March 8, 2022
139	57	"Episode 57"	Day 67-68	March 9, 2022
140	58	"Episode 58"	Day 68-69	March 10, 2022
141	59	"Episode 59"	Day 69-70	March 11, 2022
142	60	"Episode 60"	Day 70-72 & Live Show 10	March 12, 2022
Week 11 - Back to reality week
143	61	"Episode 61"	Day 72-73	March 14, 2022
144	62	"Episode 62"	Day 73-74	March 15, 2022
145	63	"Episode 63"	Day 74-75	March 16, 2022
146	64	"Episode 64"	Day 75-76	March 17, 2022
147	65	"Episode 65"	Day 76-77	March 18, 2022
148	66	"Episode 66"	Day 77-79 & Live Show 11	March 19, 2022
Week 12 - Final week
149	67	"Episode 67"	Day 79-80	March 21, 2022
150	68	"Episode 68"	Day 80-81	March 22, 2022
151	69	"Episode 69"	Day 81-82	March 23, 2022
152	70	"Episode 70"	Day 82-83	March 24, 2022
153	71	"Episode 71"	Day 83-84	March 25, 2022
154	72	"Episode 72"	Day 84-86 & Final	March 26, 2022

== Nominations table ==
Housemates from The Netherlands
Housemates from Belgium

	Week 1	Week 2	Week 3	Week 4	Week 5	Week 6	Week 7	Week 8	Week 9		Week 10	Week 11		Week 12		
	Week 1	Week 2	Week 3	Week 4	Week 5	Week 6	Week 7	Week 8	Day 61	Day 62	Week 10	Day 75	Day 76	Day 79	Final	
Salar	Sercan	No; Nominations	Amy; Eveline	Nawel	Julio; Nawel	Nawel; Peter	Caretaker	N/A	N/A	Nawel; Julio	Nawel; Grace	Not; Eligible	Finalist	No; Nominations	Winner (Day 86)	
Grace	Not; Eligible	No; Nominations	Leroy; Amy	N/A	N/A	Peter; Salar	No; Nominations	Caretaker	N/A	Kristof; Julio	Salar x2 Nouchine	Not; Eligible	No; Nominations	No; Nominations	Runner-Up (Day 86)	
Kristof	Not; Eligible	No; Nominations	Amy; Eveline	Eveline	Nawel	Nawel; Salar	No; Nominations	N/A	N/A	Julio; Nawel	Nawel; Grace	Salar to save	Finalist	No; Nominations	Third Place (Day 86)	
Nouchine	Not; Eligible	No; Nominations	Dimitri; Vera; Leroy	Peter; Vera	Dimitri	N/A	No; Nominations	N/A	N/A	Kristof; Grace	Tobias; Grace	Salar to save	Finallist	No; Nominations	Evicted (Day 83)	
Tobias	Not; Eligible	No; Nominations	Eveline; Peter	Nawel	Temporarily; Left	Nawel; Peter	No; Nominations	N/A	N/A	Nawel; Julio	Nouchine; Nawel	Not; Eligible	No; Nominations	Evicted (Day 79)		
Nawel	Kristof	No; Nominations	Vera; Dimitri; Leroy	Vera	Salar	Kristof	No; Nominations	N/A	N/A	Kristof; Tobias	Salar x3 Tobias	Evicted (Day 72)				
Julio	Not in House		Salar	Kristof	Dimitri; Peter	Kristof; Peter	No; Nominations	N/A	N/A	Kristof; Nawel	Evicted (Day 65)					
Hanne	Not in House		Kristof	Eveline; Peter	N/A	Julio; Salar	No; Nominations	N/A	Evicted (Day 58)							
Leroy	Not in House		Salar; Dimitri	Peter; Vera	Dimitri; Salar	Kristof; Salar	No; Nominations	Evicted (Day 51)								
Vera	Not; Eligible	No; Nominations	Amy; Leroy	Eveline	Julio; Nawel	Peter	No; Nominations	Evicted (Day 51)								
Peter	Not; Eligible	No; Nominations	Vera; Kristof; Salar	Julio	Nawel; Vera	Vera; Julio	Evicted (Day 44)									
Dimitri	Not; Eligible	No; Nominations	Peter	Julio; Nawel	Peter	Evicted (Day 37)										
Eveline	Not in House	Exempt	Salar	Vera	Evicted (Day 30)											
Amy	Not in House	Exempt	Vera; Salar	Evicted (Day 23)												
Kitty	Not; Eligible	No; Nominations	Evicted (Day 16)													
Sercan	Not; Eligible	Evicted (Day 9)														
Public nomination	none						Kristof; Leroy; Nawel; Salar; Vera	none								
Notes																
Nominated (pre-save)	none	All Housemates	none				Kristof; Leroy; Nawel; Salar; Vera	none	~~Kristof~~; ~~Nawel~~	none	Grace; Nawel; Salar	none				
Little Brother (Caretaker)	none	none	Nouchine	none	Leroy	none	Salar	Grace	Salar		Grace	none				
Saved	none	none					Kristof	none								
Immunity	none	Hanne; Julio; Nawel	Dimitri; Grace; Hanne; Leroy; Nouchine; Salar; Tobias	none					Nouchine		Kristof	Kristof; Nouchine	Kristof; Nouchine; Salar	Kristof	none	
Against public vote	Kristof; Sercan	Kitty; Peter	Amy; Eveline; Leroy	Eveline; Julio; Nawel	Dimitri; Nawel; Salar	Nawel; Peter; Salar	Leroy; Nawel; Vera	Hanne; Nawel	none	Julio; Nawel	Nawel; Salar	none	Grace; Tobias	Grace; Nouchine; Salar	Grace; Kristof; Salar	
Evicted	Sercan; Fewest votes to save	Kitty; Fewest votes to save	Amy; Fewest votes to save	Eveline; Fewest votes to save	Dimitri; Fewest votes to save	Peter; Fewest votes to save	Leroy & Vera; Fewest votes to save	Hanne; Fewest votes to save	Nominations; Void by rewind token	Julio; Fewest votes to save	Nawel; Fewest votes to save	Salar; Kristof & Nouchine's choice to be finalist	Tobias; Fewest votes to save	Nouchine; Fewest votes to save	Kristof; Fewest votes to win	Grace; Fewest votes to win
Evicted	Sercan; Fewest votes to save	Kitty; Fewest votes to save	Amy; Fewest votes to save	Eveline; Fewest votes to save	Dimitri; Fewest votes to save	Peter; Fewest votes to save	Leroy & Vera; Fewest votes to save	Hanne; Fewest votes to save	Nominations; Void by rewind token	Julio; Fewest votes to save	Nawel; Fewest votes to save	Salar; Kristof & Nouchine's choice to be finalist	Tobias; Fewest votes to save	Nouchine; Fewest votes to save	Salar; Most votes to win	
