= Beverley O'Connor =

Australian journalist and broadcaster

- Born: 13 November 1960 (age 65); Johannesburg, South Africa
- Occupations: Television host; radio presenter; journalist
- Employer: Australian Broadcasting Corporation

Beverley O'Connor (born 13 November 1960) is an Australian journalist and television and radio presenter. For ten years, she hosted The World on ABC News.

O'Connor was born in South Africa and studied journalism in Johannesburg. She also studied drama and ballet. She moved to Australia in the 1980s.

== Career ==
=== Broadcasting ===
O'Connor has worked for ABC radio and television since 1987. She specialised in economics and politics and was a presenter on ABC Radio Melbourne for five years before moving to the Seven Network in 2004. She was weeknight sports presenter on Seven News Melbourne until January 2005, when she was replaced by Sandy Roberts.

She was the entertainment presenter on the Seven Network's Melbourne Weekender in 2006 and she previously formed a part of the Vega 91.5 FM radio breakfast crew alongside Dave O'Neil, Shaun Micallef and Denise Scott. O'Connor used to read the news and traffic throughout the breakfast program until she resigned in mid-2007.

In 2008, O'Connor filled in as weekend presenter of ABC News Victoria while Tamara Oudyn was replacing weeknight presenter Ian Henderson. She remains a regular fill-in presenter for the bulletin.

In August 2014, O'Connor was appointed presenter of The World on ABC News replacing both Jim Middleton and Zoe Daniel.

In August 2024, O'Connor announced she was leaving the ABC after a stint of 15 years at the broadcaster.

=== Other work ===
O'Connor was the first female director of the Melbourne Football Club, where she was on the board for nine years, and the first woman to hold a vice-presidency role with an Australian Football League (AFL) club. She stood down from the board in 2008, the year in which there was a challenge led by Jim Stynes.

In 1998, O'Connor hosted the Ethnic Business Awards, a national business award highlighting migrant and Indigenous excellence in business. She hosted these awards again in 2000.

O'Connor is a life governor of the Drug and Alcohol Foundation, having served for six years on the board. She is an Australia Day ambassador and was an inaugural board member of the Sunrise foundation which helps elite athletes to combat depression.

Media offices
| Preceded by Jim Middleton & Zoe Daniel | The World; Presenter; 2014–present | Succeeded by Incumbent |
| Preceded by Jim Wilson | Seven News Melbourne; Weeknight sport presenter 2004–2005 | Succeeded by Sandy Roberts |
