= Big Brother (Dutch and Belgian TV series) =

Dutch version of Big Brother

- Logo
- Genre: Reality competition
- Based on: Big Brother by John de Mol Jr.
- Presented by: Geraldine Kemper; Tatyana Beloy; Peter Van de Veire
- Countries of origin: Netherlands; Belgium
- Original language: Dutch
- No. of series: 5
- No. of episodes: 211

Production
- Production company: Endemol

Original release
- Network: RTL 5 (Netherlands); RTL 4 (Netherlands premiere); VIER/Play4 (Belgium)
- Release: 4 January 2021 – 4 April 2025

Related
- Big Brother

Big Brother is the Dutch & Belgian cooperation version of the international reality television franchise Big Brother produced by Endemol and originating in the Netherlands. The show aired in Netherlands on RTL 5 and in the Flemish Region on VIER/Play4 and has had a total of five seasons. The first season of the show aired in 2021. The fifth season and last season aired in 2025. On October 16, 2025, it was announced that the program would not return due to high production costs.

It was the comeback of Big Brother in the Netherlands after a 14 years absence and in Belgium after a 13 years absence. After five seasons, this series ended in 2025.

== Format ==
The format of Big Brother has the same format as the international Big Brother franchise. A group of strangers lives together in an isolated home. They have to work together to succeed in tasks but next to that they also have to nominate each other. The nominated housemates are up for eviction by the audience. Ultimately, the last housemate who leaves the house is the winner. The program was reintroduced in as the ultimate social experiment.

The series introduced concept changes to the previous Dutch and Belgian versions, some inspired by the American and Canadian versions:

- the housemaster: a housemate who had more privileges compared to other housemates and had immunity for the nominations in season 1.
- the jackpot: the money prize was built or reduced by winning challenges.
- the voting of the audience: while in previous editions the audience had to vote for the exit of one of the nominated housemates, the viewer now had to vote for the housemate they wanted to keep in the house. Voting was free for this series while in previous editions the viewer had to phone a paid number or send text messages.
- the influence of the audience: in this series the audience had an influence at the Big Brother house and its housemates. They could vote for rewards, such as choosing which housemate would become caretaker, but in the second season they could also vote for punishments.
- the power of immunity: added since season 2, housemates could win immunity by winning challenges.
- the power of nomination: added since season 3, housemates who won the power of nomination game, were the only ones able to nominate other housemates.

=== The house ===
A new house was built in Amsterdam. It was built next to the Johan Cruyff Arena at a parking lot of Endemol Shine Nederland in a few months. It was a 300 m^{2} House and had 125 cameras installed (100 indoor cameras and 25 outdoor cameras) and 39 speakers. All cameras were remote controlled compared to the hidden walkways with camera men in the previous editions.

For the second season, the house was completely restyled. A bigger entrance was built at the garden. The gameroom was extended and a shop added. A bathtub was added in the places of one of the showers. The house was again redecorated for the third season. An outdoor game are, a wall and secret room were added. Next to the house, a showbuilding was built. A new entrance and cocoon room were added for the fourth season in 2024. The secret room was made bigger. The show building now also had room for audience members who could be present during the Live broadcasts and exits for the first time after the COVID 19 epidemic.

== History ==
In 1999, Veronica launched Big Brother in the Netherlands. It was an idea of John de Mol Jr. It was a huge success and the concept was sold international. In the Netherlands there were six regular seasons and two celebrity editions, until it disappeared from screen in 2006. In Belgium, the first series was launched in 2000 which became one of the most successful series international. It was followed with another five regular seasons, two celebrity seasons and an all-stars season until it was cancelled in 2007.

20 years after the launch of Big Brother, EndemolShine revealed in September 2019 they wanted to bring the series back to the Netherlands. In July 2020 broadcoaster RTL 5 announced Big Brother would return in the Netherlands after a 14 years absence and to celebrate the 20th anniversary of the Big Brother franchise. Some weeks later it was announced it would be a cooperation with the Flemish part of Belgium were the series would be broadcoasted by VIER/Play4. The first season was for three years in preparation. The concept was based at the American and Canadian versions that were still very successful. This meant housemates could speak freely about nominations and that housemates had to play the game more tactical. Producer Jeroen Compeer called it the beginning of a new Big Brother era. Following misbehavior in other international series, this series made a guideline which future housemates had to read and sign. This guideline featured rules about expected behavior, including a thumbs up from both housemates who would become intimate to make sure both give permission and are full of consciousness. Other measures involved no alcohol before 7pm.

The launch of the first season had very high ratings. It had more than 1.3 million viewers in the Netherlands and over 500,000 viewers in Belgium. The reboot was responsible for being SBS Belgium's best January ever. The season had good rating, online and lineair. In the first three weeks the season had an average of 447.859 viewers in Flanders. Online it had 2.708.173 views. The livestream was watched in the first weeks a 1.017.899 times. A new medium that had to be considered was social media. During the first season, the housemates were confronted with social media. This could be posts at social media by themselves before their time in the house but also reactions of viewers. Shortly after showing some messages of viewers, three housemates left the house voluntarily. Later during the season, there was so much commotion at social media about housemate Jerrel Baumann, producers decided to put all social media of the series for a few days in black. The winner of the first season was Jill Goede. There was controversy because the voting websites crashed during the final vote. The winner was declared by a bailiff consulting the last intermediate score. The final was watched by 488.000 viewers in the Netherlands and 401.062 viewers in Belgium. VIER/Play4 was satisfied with the first season. It had an average of 377.000 television viewers, 9,5 million views at the website and 3,5 million views for the livestream in Flanders. It had an average of 507.000 viewers in the Netherlands. The voice of Big Brother was one of the most successful ingedrients this season. When the season ended, it was revealed Jeroen Compaer was the voice behind Big Brother. He was selected through a casting to find a voice that would appeal to both Dutch and Belgian viewers. While the idea in the beginning was to make Big Brother a friendly psychopath, this idea changed throughout the season. However it stayed important for Big Brother not displaying any emotion.

A second season followed in 2022. Following the criticism during the first season, the producers changed a lot to make the second season more exciting by creating week themes, more challenges for the housemates and making the influence of the viewers bigger. Thomas Nagels, housemate of the first season, joined the creative team with his experience of living in the house himself. The ratings of the launch dropped considerably with 586.000 viewers in the Netherlands at both RTL 4 & RTL 5, a drop of 56%, and 376.510 viewers at the Belgian Play4. The season made headlines when Big Brother gave warnings following racistic, discriminating and sexistic remarks and behaviour. The first couple, Dimitri Rodaro and Vera Dijkstra got a lot of attention. By the end of February it was announced the series would end two weeks sooner than the expected finale. Producers stated it was always planned this way and was a way to have another twist for the housemates. The housemates weren't informed about the conflict between Russia and Ukraine since no housemates had family or relatives involved. In one of the last weeks, a plane flew over the house with a banner supporting housemate Nawel Seghairi, who had been nominated for six weeks in a row. Actress and writer Leen Dendievel pointed to Seghairi's nominations at International Women's Day to show its importance, saying Seghairi is a strong woman who is always nominated by male housemates who can't handle such women. Viewers complained when Kristof Timmermans won a golden key to the final, more than two weeks for the final. It had many consequences for the other housemates meaning popular housemates had to leave the house. Viewers said the ticket for Timmermans was fixed by producers, stating the producers wanted two Belgian and two Dutch housemates, one male and one female of each nationality, for the final week. Spokesman Salomon of Play4 denied Timmermans was protected. The season was won by Salar Abassi Abraasi. The final had 295.000 viewers in the Netherland and 208.449 viewers in Belgium.

The series returned for a third season in January 2023. The concept of the program was rethought, focussing on the housemates playing individual and adding the power of nomination of international series and the Big Brother coins. The season had to played much more individual. Outcaster from the first weeks Jason Glas became very popular with the audience. They arranged a plane with banner for him. Because the game was played much more individual, there were more tensions then the previous seasons. The livestream was even stopped one time. However the housemates had lots of sympathy. Hosts Kemper and Beloy said there were never more Valentine cards and gifts than for the housemates of that season. Viewers complained when the evicted housemate Danny Volkers was able to return to the house and compete back in the game. Bart Vandenbroek won the season. He was the first Belgian winner following two winners from the Netherlands.

Before the start of the fourth season presenters Beloy and Kemper they made a call for tolerance after hateful posts on social media during last season and housemates who had a hard time reading them. Many changes of the third season were kept but new rules were added. The housemates had to work, sleep and nominate in duos for the first time. The launch had more viewers than the previous season, reaching 483.000 viewers in the Netherlands.

For the first time in this series, fans were allowed into the house during a freeze assignment where residents were not allowed to move and/or talk. One of the most talked about contestants, Ashley De Graaf, bought an exemption for 20,000 euros of the prize money near the end, this made headlines. Tyron Bolwerk went home for 15,000 euros from the jackpot a week before the finals. Glenn Van Himst was the winner of the season. He won 56,266 euros.

For the fifth season, it was announced in the summer of 2024 that everything would be different this season. For example, the house was stripped of all luxury at the start, the residents had to wear uniforms, there was only ‘Big Brother slop’ to eat at the start, and there was a new role called ‘Decision makers’. The live shows on Saturdays and the accompanying presenters were also replaced by a short live broadcast from the house in which Big Brother addressed the residents and announced the exit. The resident who was voted out was not welcomed in a live studio by family and friends, but in the diary room where the resident spoke their last words with Big Brother. All these changes made for a tougher stay, with four residents leaving voluntarily - some for personal reasons and others simply because they were hungry. Jeffrey Leijzen and Jolien Pede became a couple, but before their relationship could really get started, Leijzen was voted out. Halfway through the game, tactical player Jordy de Maar formed a nomination union ‘the cartel’ with some fellow residents. Because of ‘the cartel,’ the other residents had few opportunities in the house. It also divided the viewing audience, who spoke of favouritism, image manipulation, and deliberate preferential treatment in games that often benefited ‘the cartel.’ Ultimately, the leader of ‘the cartel,’ Jordy de Maar, won this edition.

After the controversial fifth season, there was silence from the production team following all the online hate directed at the participants. In October 2025, the Flemish channel Play confirmed that they wanted to stop at the peak of their success and withdraw from the Big Brother collaboration. The Dutch channel RTL immediately followed suit, stating that they could not possibly bear the high production costs alone and that this meant the end of this Big Brother series.

== Series details and viewership ==
Season	Episodes	Originally released			Days	Housemates	Winner	Runner(s)-up	Prize money
Season	Episodes	First released	Last released	Network	Days	Housemates	Winner	Runner(s)-up	Prize money
1	82	23 April 2021	16 July 2021	(Netherlands) RTL 5 (Belgium) VIER/Play4	99	19	(Netherlands) Jill Goede	(Belgium) Nick Kraft & (Belgium) Liese Luwel	€70,405.50
2	72	3 January 2022	26 March 2022	(Netherlands) RTL 5 (Belgium) VIER/Play4	86	16	(Netherlands) Salar Abassi Abraasi	(Netherlands) Grace Rodrigues & (Belgium) Kristof Timmermans	€69,815
3	72	9 January 2023	1 April 2023	(Netherlands) RTL 5 (Belgium) VIER/Play4	86	16	(Belgium) Bart Vandenbroek	(Netherlands) Jason Glas & (Belgium) Jolien Bosch	€73,388
4	78	15 January 2024	13 April 2024	(Netherlands) RTL 5 (Belgium) VIER/Play4	93	18	(Belgium) Glenn Van Himst	(Netherlands) Alice Kappenburg & (Netherlands) Randy Yonce	€56,266
5	65	6 January 2025	4 April 2025	(Netherlands) RTL 5 (Belgium) VIER/Play4	92	18	(Netherlands) Jordy de Maar	(Belgium) Mattheüs Jonckheere & (Belgium) Sharice Vansteelant	€55,500

== Presentation ==
Season	(Netherlands)	(Belgium)
Big Brother 2021	Geraldine Kemper	Peter Van de Veire
Big Brother 2022	Geraldine Kemper	Peter Van de Veire
Big Brother 2023	Geraldine Kemper	Tatyana Beloy
Big Brother 2024	Geraldine Kemper	Tatyana Beloy

== Broadcasting ==
The show was broadcoasted in the Netherlands at RTL 5 and the premiere also at RTL 4. The show was broadcast on Vier (later rebranded as Play4) in Flanders.

Season	Broadcaster	Monday	Tuesday	Wednesday	Thursday	Friday	Saturday
1	RTL 5	Highlights shows (9:30 pm)				Live show (9:30 pm)	Weekly overview (6:00 pm)
1	VIER/Play4	Highlights shows (9:30 pm)				Live show (9:30 pm)	Weekly overview (9:50 pm)
2	RTL 5	Highlights shows (8:30 pm)					Live show (8:00 pm)
2	Play4	Highlights shows (7:35 pm)					Live show (8:00 pm)
3	RTL 5	Highlights shows (8:30 pm)					Live show (8:00 pm)
3	Play4	Highlights shows (10:00 pm)					Live show (8:00 pm)
4	RTL 5	Highlights shows (8:30 pm)					Live show (8:00 pm)
4	Play4	Highlights shows (10:15 pm)					Live show (8:00 pm)
5	RTL 5	Highlights shows (8:30 pm)				Highlights show + Live Exit (8:30 pm)	
5	Play4	Highlights shows (10:20 pm)				Highlights show + Live Exit (8:30 pm)	

== Live stream ==
The live stream was on a special channel 247 at Telenet and Vier.be (later changed to Play4.be) in Flanders. In the Netherlands it had two live streams at Videoland.

== Notable contestants ==
Liese Luwel from season 1 was the contestant who stayed for the longest time in the Big Brother house. She entered during the launch and got to the final. The other two seasons were shortened in time, making her the only housemate staying for 99 days in the house. Nawel Seghairi of the second season was the contestant who received the most nominations. She was nominated eight times in a row by mostly male housemates. Danny Volker of season 3 was the first housemate to return to the house and compete again after being evicted. Ashley De Graaf was the second housemate to return after being evicted in the fourth season. She returned only a few hours after being evicted when another housemate who was nominated voluntarily left the house.

Season 1 winner Jill Goede created her own clothing line and appeared in other television programs. Season 1 runner-up Nick Kraft enjoyed bigger success with his alterego Ronny Retro and even played at Tomorrowland.

The relationship that developed during the second season between Dimitri Rodaro and Vera Dijkstra did not last, ending after a few months. Season 1 winner Jill Goede and season 2 contestant Leroy de Rouw had a relationship and a child together.
