= ABV (TV station) =

Television station in Victoria, Australia

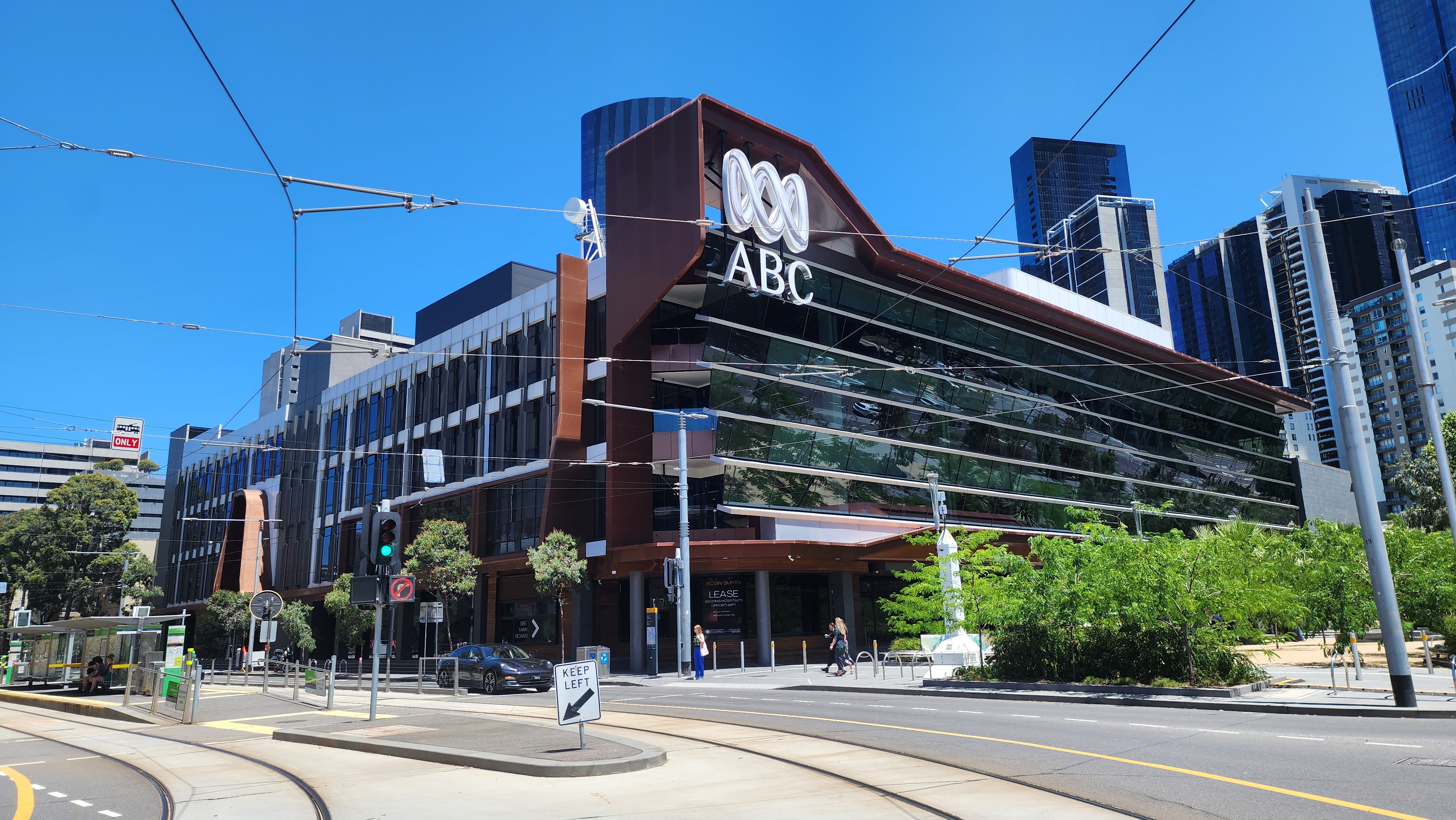
- Melbourne, Victoria; Australia
- Channels: Digital: 12 (VHF); Virtual: 2
- Branding: ABC TV

Programming
- Language: English
- Affiliations: ABC Television

Ownership
- Owner: Australian Broadcasting Corporation

History
- First air date: 19 November 1956
- Former channel numbers: 2 (VHF) (Analog, 1956–2013)
- Call sign meaning: ABC Victoria

Technical information
- Licensing authority: Australian Communications and Media Authority
- ERP: 50 kW
- HAAT: 534 m (Note: Height above average terrain (HAAT) estimated from the ITU SRTM3 database, using EHAAT.)
- Transmitter coordinates: 37°50′6″S 145°20′54″E

Links
- Website: www.abc.net.au/tv/

ABV is the call sign of the Australian Broadcasting Corporation's television station in Melbourne, Victoria.

== History ==
The station began broadcasting on 19 November 1956 and is transmitted throughout the state via a network of relay transmitters. ABV was the second television station founded in Victoria after the first, HSV-7, which opened two weeks earlier on 4 November, as well as being the fourth television station to launch in Australia overall (the first being TCN-9, the Nine Network's Sydney station, the second being HSV-7, the Seven Network's Melbourne station, and the third being ABN-2, the ABC's station in Sydney). The studios are located in Southbank (although formerly in Elsternwick) with the transmitter at Mount Dandenong.

The analogue television signal for Melbourne was shut off on 10 December 2013, the last city in a phased shutdown as part of the conversion to digital television in Australia.

== Programming ==
=== Local programming ===
ABV follows a schedule nearly identical to that of other statewide ABC Television stations, allowing for time differences and some local programming – including news, current affairs, sport and state election coverage.

ABC News Victoria is presented by Tamara Oudyn from Sunday to Thursday and Iskhandar Razak on Friday and Saturday. Weeknight bulletins include sport presented by Alexia Pesce, weather forecasts from Dr Adam Morgan, and a national finance segment presented by David Chau.

Fill‑in presenters include Alexandra Alvaro, Ben Knight and Danny Tran (News); Nate Byrne and Danny Tran (Weather); and Tom Maddocks (Sport).

ABV also carried live coverage of Victorian Football League matches on Saturday afternoons during the season until 2015 and the finals of the TAC Cup.

- Former sports presenter Angela Pippos resigned in October 2007 after being demoted as weeknight sports presenter to weekend presenter in 2004 to make way for Peter Wilkins. It was documented in the press that Pippos had some run-ins with senior management over this issue and the timing of her departure, which came after she was approached by Victorian premier John Brumby to run as a candidate in the Williamstown state by-election, caused by the resignation of former premier Steve Bracks. Pippos was suspended for one week while she made her decision not to stand, but resigned just weeks later.
- In 2008, ABC News Victoria won one week in the 2008 television ratings season, and tied in another week with Seven News Melbourne.

=== Networked programming from ABV ===
News/Current Affairs

- ABC News Victoria
- ABC News at Eleven (via ABC News Channel)
- Afternoon Briefing (via ABC News Channel)
- News Breakfast (weekdays)
- The World (via ABC News Channel)
- The World This Week (via ABC News Channel)
- Insiders
- Offsiders

Drama

- Sleuth 101
- East of Everything
- Miss Fisher's Murder Mysteries
- The Doctor Blake Mysteries

Entertainment

- The Weekly with Charlie Pickering (2015–present)
- Spicks and Specks (2005–2011, 2014)
- Gardening Australia
- Beached Az
- Rage

=== Past programming ===
- Dirty Laundry Live (2013–2016)
- 7.30 Victoria
- Newsline with Jim Middleton (via Australia Network)
- VFL
- The Slap (Australian TV series)
- Adam Hills In Gordon Street Tonight (2011–2013)
- Studio 3 (via ABC Me) (2009–2016)
- The Librarians
- Prank Patrol (via ABC Me) (2009–2013)
- The Marngrook Footy Show (2011–2012)
- Bed of Roses (2008–2011)
- Stateline (1995–2010) Replaced by 7.30 Victoria
- Summer Heights High (2008)
- We Can Be Heroes: Finding The Australian of the Year (2005)
- George Negus Tonight (2002–2004)
- Kath & Kim (2002–2004) Production moved to HSV7
- Something in the Air (TV series) (2000–2002)
- The 10:30 Slot (1999–2000)
- The Micallef P(r)ogram(me) (1998–2001)
- Shaun Micallef's Mad as Hell (2012-2022)
- Sea Change (1998–2000)
- Recovery (1996–2000)
- The Adventures of Lano and Woodley (1997–1999)
- Frontline (1994–1997)
- Round the Twist (1989–2001)
- The D-Generation (1986–1988)
- Just Barbara (1962)

=== History ===
Past programming produced at ABV-2 included Corinne Kerby's Let's Make a Date, the popular children's fantasy Adventure Island, the multi-award-winning series Power Without Glory, entertainment show The Big Gig and the iconic youth music program Countdown.

Early efforts by the station included Variety View (1958–1959), Melbourne Magazine (1957), Sweet and Low (1959) and Melody Time (1957–1959).

The first dramatic production by the station was a live, 30-minute play called Roundabout which aired on 4 January 1957.

ABV Channel 2 moved to new studios at Ripponlea in 1958, in Gordon Street, Elsternwick, with two major studios: Studio 31 & 32. The land had been acquired from the adjacent Rippon Lea Estate. Over the years, many additional properties were leased. The ABC began consolidating all their Melbourne operations in 1999, with purchase of a property behind their Southbank premises which had housed their radio operations since 1994. The television news moved to Southbank in 2000, and the government approved a loan in 2013 to move the studio production. The facility was finished in 2017 and the final show to be filmed at Ripponlea was Shaun Micallef's Mad as Hell in November 2017, with all production consolidated into a single Studio 31 at Southbank after that.

== Relay stations ==
The following stations relay ABV throughout Victoria:

Call	Region served	City	Channels Analog (Digital)	First air date	Meaning of call sign 3rd element (Note: In the regional four-character call signs, in all cases AB signifies "Australian Broadcasting", while V stands for the state of "Victoria". The third character is the distinguishing element, derived from the local placename, as detailed.)	ERP; Analog (Digital)	HAAT; Analog (Digital)	Transmitter coordinates	Transmitter location
ABAV	Victorian Upper Murray; (Upper Hume region)	Albury–Wodonga	1 VHF (Note: Analogue transmissions ceased as of 5 May 2011 as part of the conversion to digital television.); (11 VHF)	15 December 1964	Albury	160 kW; (75 kW)	496 m; (525 m)	36°15′13″S 146°51′20″E	Mount Baranduda
ABEV	Bendigo	Bendigo	1 VHF; (29 UHF)	29 April 1963	BEndigo or Esperance	130 kW; (420 kW)	512 m; (517 m)	36°59′32″S 144°18′30″E	Mount Alexander
ABGV	Goulburn Valley	Shepparton	40 UHF (Note: ABRV was on VHF channel 3 from its 1963 sign-on until sometime around 1991, moving to VHF channel 11 in order to accommodate FM radio. It moved to its current channel on 22 January 2001 in order to accommodate digital television in Melbourne.); (37 UHF)	28 November 1963	Goulburn Valley	1200 kW; (230 kW)	372 m; (378 m)	36°21′29″S 145°41′42″E	Mount Major
ABLV	Latrobe Valley	Traralgon	40 UHF (Note: ABLV was on VHF channel 4 from its 1963 sign-on until 1991, moving to its current channel in order to accommodate FM radio.); (29 UHF)	30 September 1963	Latrobe Valley	1600 kW; (400 kW)	520 m; (520 m)	38°23′57″S 146°33′53″E	Mount Tassie
ABMV	Mildura and Sunraysia	Mildura	6 VHF (Note: ABMV was on VHF channel 4 from its 1965 sign-on until sometime in the 1990s, moving to its current channel in order to accommodate FM radio.) (Note: ABMV was on VHF channel 6 until 30 June 2010 due to the Analogue switchoff in the Mildura–Sunraysia region.); (11 VHF)	22 November 1965	Mildura	200 kW; (50 kW)	152 m; (152 m)	34°22′47″S 142°11′18″E	Yatpool
ABRV	Ballarat	Ballarat	42 UHF; (35 UHF)	20 May 1963	BallaRat or Regional Victoria	2000 kW; (300 kW)	710 m; (713 m)	37°16′57″S 143°14′52″E	Lookout Hill
ABSV	Murray Valley	Swan Hill	2 VHF; (47 UHF)	30 July 1965	Swan Hill	200 kW; (320 kW)	144 m; (201 m)	35°28′22″S 143°27′22″E	Goschen
ABWV	Western District	Hamilton	5A VHF; (6 VHF)	28 July 1981	Western Victoria	130 kW; (32 kW)	356 m; (365 m)	37°27′32″S 141°54′58″E	Mount Dundas

== See also ==
- Television broadcasting in Australia
