= Big Brother 2025 (Dutch and Belgian TV series) =

- Season 5
- Presented by: Geraldine Kemper; Tatyana Beloy
- No. of days: 92
- No. of housemates: 18
- Winner: Jordy de Maar
- Runner-up: Mattheüs Jonckheere

Release
- Original network: Netherlands; RTL 5; RTL 4 (Premiere); Belgium; Play4
- Original release: 6 January – 4 April 2025

Season chronology
- ← Previous; Series 2024

Big Brother 2025 is the fifth cooperation season of the Dutch and Belgian version of Big Brother. It is the eleventh regular version of Big Brother in both Belgium and the Netherlands. The show is broadcast on RTL 5 in the Netherlands and Play4 in Belgium beginning on 6 January 2025. Live streams are available 24/7 on Videoland for Dutch viewers and on GoPlay.be and Telenet for Belgian viewers.

In the summer of 2024, when calling for candidates, the program makers announced that the new season would be completely different from previous seasons. At the unveiling of the house in early January 2025, this was confirmed. The house received a complete makeover and was barely furnished. There was also only 1 bed in the only large bedroom. There were several new rooms such as the Decision Room, the Panic Room and the Vault.

In addition to changed spaces in the house, the concept was also greatly altered. For example, the season started back-to-basics and residents had to compete for furniture, their own clothes and food. There were several new game elements. Critics again called the program fun.

The Live show was changed by a short Live Exit Broadcast. Starting in Week 2, a podcast was also recorded in the house.

The budding relationship of Jeffrey Leijzen and Jolien Pede received much attention in the broadcasts. One of the most talked about residents, Lennie Blockmans, left the house after a few weeks for health reasons. When three housemates voluntarily left the house on three days midway through the season, the question was raised whether this season was too harsh. Programmers assured that the three candidates left the house for three different private matters related and that it was always planned that from midway through the season the residents would have more luxuries. Because of the harsh conditions during the first half, tensions and discussions often arose between residents. Halfway through the game, tactical player Jordy de Maar formed a nomination union "the cartel" with some fellow residents, this created a tough game and backlash from the other residents.

Viewers spoke of manipulation by favoritism for members of "the cartel" by Big Brother through exemptions, tailored assignments and chosen images in the television broadcasts. A plane with message for the cartel, collected by fans, for "the cartel" was shown in a broadcast, while the first plane of that season for Jane Karto a week earlier was not featured in the broadcasts. Karto had to leave the house as the last contestant before finals week, while the last three members of "the cartel" did advance to finals week.

The final was on April 4, 2025. Jordy de Maar, leader of “the cartel,” won and received his individually saved prize money of 55,500 euros.

After five seasons, this series was axed after this season.

== Production ==
=== Format ===
Big Brother 2025 followed the same format as the previous seasons. Housemates lived isolated from the outside world in a custom-built house for a period of 100 days, hoping to be the last one to leave the house as the winner, and walk away with its cash prize.

==== Concept ====
Programmers announced in advance that this season everything would be different. At launch, it was announced that basic comforts would no longer be a certainty. The first photos of the house showed a stripped house with a barely furnished house, an enclosed kitchen, locked closets and an outdoor shower. There were also new rooms such as the Decision Room and the Panic Room. In "The Vault," housemates could buy gamechangers to bend the game to their will. In the 'Panic Room,' housemates were challenged in different ways. There was a Big Brother suite - a luxurious room to which only the housemates who had access were allowed to go. A boudoir was added.

Not only did the house look different, the game play was also different.

Changes in the concept:

- The Decision Maker: every week one resident had a special role, decision maker. This resident made important decisions in the new Decision Room about team compositions, the distribution of bedrooms, etc. In addition, this resident could choose and purchase the weekly basics and luxury ingredients.
- Each resident could create their own prize jackpot, from which only the winner would receive their effective cash prize.
- The legacy ("de erfenis"): if a resident was voted out, the residents who had nominated that resident received that resident's money.
- The nomination targets: the nomination target pin was introduced. Not everyone could be nominated. By losing assignments, being chosen by a decision maker or by a twist, a resident could become a nomination target. During the nomination round, only residents who were nomination targets could be nominated. Residents could also gain immunity through a favor or game win.
- The gamechangers: on a weekly basis, residents could use their prize pool to purchase gamechangers from the Vault. With these gamechangers, nominations could be influenced, changing the course of the game. Housemates could buy gamechangers such as double nomination vote, the revenge, the theft, the collector...

== Housemates ==
On January 3, the first ten housemates were announced. Lennie Blockmans was the first transgender candidate in this Dutch and Flemish co-produced Big Brother series. Sharice Van Steelant and Vikaash Lalbiharie entered the house under fake identities, respectively, as Nele and Remi.

Name	Age	Occupation	Country	Residence	Day entered	Day exited	Status
Jordy de Maar	27	Legal assistant	Netherlands	Kampen	1	92	Winner
Mattheüs Jonckheere	27	Content creator	Belgium	Sint-Truiden	1	92	Runner-up
Sharice "Nele" Van Steelant	26	Psychiatric nurse	Belgium	Kortrijk	9	92	3rd place
Jolien Pede	27	Bank employee & Miss Exclusive 2023	Belgium	Zwalm	6	91	Evicted
Jane Karto	28	Content creator	Netherlands	Diemen	23	85	Evicted
David Depoot	30	Plasterer	Belgium	Wevelgem	23	78	Evicted
Axel van Wingerden	28	Truck driver	Netherlands	Naaldwijk	9	71	Evicted
Keanu Bruijnen	22	Employee bowling center	Netherlands	Maastricht	1	64	Evicted
Milena Dadabayeva	33	Account manager IT	Belgium	Mechelen	1	57	Evicted
Elsa Rudge	53	Prison guard	Netherlands	Rijnsburg	1	50	Evicted
Eva de Graaf	23	Beautician	Netherlands	Haarlem	25	45	Walked
David De Saedeleer	51	Contractor	Belgium	Ninove	23	43	Walked
Wicky/Vikaash "Remi" Lalbiharie	26	Port employee	Netherlands	Hoofddorp	6	43	Walked
Jeffrey Leijzen	24	Unemployed	Belgium	Belsele	1	36	Evicted
Niels Mestdagh	38	Firefighter & entrepreneur	Belgium	Blankenberge	1	29	Evicted
Lennie Blockmans	26	Student psychology & therapist	Belgium	Antwerp	1	19	Walked
Linda van den Akker	46	Orderpicker	Netherlands	Heesch	1	15	Evicted
Fleur van der Vegt	31	Estate agent	Netherlands	Haarlem	1	8	Evicted

== Weekly summary ==
The main events in the Big Brother house are summarised in the table below.

Week 1
On Day 1, the 10 first housemates entered the house. These were Elsa, Fleur, Jeffrey, Jordy, Keanu, Lennie, Linda, Mattheüs, Milena and Niels. The housemates were given the chance to press a button for an exemption and a personal benefit, or not to press at all and already make a lot of money together. The group unanimously chose not to press. This earned them 100 euros each. In the next assignment, the housemates had another chance to print. This time there were eight prizes at stake, from 1,000 euros over a golden key to a can of ravioli. Again, no one pressed. Once again 100 euros per person was handed out. On the last round, the housemates were obliged to press, but with a twist: the fastest and the slowest would be penalized. Jordy pressed first, Keanu last - and both received a nomination target pin. This week, only they could be nominated. The rest of the group was allowed to choose a prize and enter the house.

Once inside, the housemates quickly discovered that comfort was far away and the only food was "slob." Elsa, thanks to her choice of mystery box, was able to enter the "Big Brother" suite with the golden key. She chose Linda to accompany her.

When the housemates introduced themselves to each other, Lennie's sex change came up. The fellow housemates listened with admiration to the path she has already taken.

On Day 2, housemates were awakened by an alarm. This was the shower alarm. During this alarm there was hot water in the showers. Each housemate was allowed a maximum of 5min to shower with hot water.

Niels was called to the Decision Room by the prize he had chosen the day before. One housemate was allowed to accompany him: this was Jeffrey. Both got the pin with 'Decision maker'. Later they could decide to buy food with the housemates' personal jackpots, this they did. Lennie was called to the jackpot because she had chosen the clothing token the day before. She was allowed to open her closet but was not allowed to share her clothes with anyone. Linda was able to go to the Vault because of her choice of the key on the first day but there she decided not to buy a gamechanger.

Keanu struggled because he has trouble opening up with new people, saying that few people really know him.

During Day 3, the decision makers must assemble two teams. Team green consists of Niels, Elsa, Jordy, Keanu & Milena. Team pink consists of Jeffrey, Fleur, Lennie, Linda & Mattheüs. The teams compete against each other in the game area and must keep their balance via a pendulum course to reach the other side in group. Team pink wins. They receive a cash prize of 1,000 euros and a clothing token. The clothing token is unanimously given to Fleur. In the Decision Room, the members of team pink get to choose one by one how much of the money they won they will take for their personal jackpot. As previously agreed, they each choose a fifth, which is 200 euros.

In the afternoon, the decision makers must put together a group of 5 housemates for an assignment where the first part of the kitchen can be unlocked. Jeffrey chooses for himself, Jordy, Keanu, Lennie and Matthew. They have to keep a ball with poles in the air for 2 hours. The group succeeds and a part of the kitchen is opened allowing the housemates to cook and they have a refrigerator. Decision maker Niels regrets that he was not involved in the composition of the group.

On Day 4, decision makers must give three other housemates a nomination target pin. Each housemate must give a motivation as to why they do not deserve this pin. Decision makers Jeffrey & Niels are not on the same page. Jeffrey is having a very hard time because he sees Elsa as a mother figure to him. Without explanation, the decision makers give Milena, Fleur and Elsa a pin in this order.

Later that day, all housemates have to name three housemates from the group of housemates with target pin - Elsa, Fleur, Jordy, Keanu and Milena. Fleur, Jordy and Milena are the first nominated housemates.

On Day 6, Jolien and Remi enter the house as new housemates. Remi is Vikaash's fake identity; he has the secret assignment of pretending to be different.

On Day 8, there was the Live Eviction Broadcast. Jordy was exempted first. Fleur was the first housemate to be voted out.

Week 2 - Nomination games
On Day 9, Elsa, Jeffrey, Jordy, Keanu, Linda, Mattheüs and Niels inherit the money from voted-out housemate Fleur. They inherit this because they nominated her. Mattheus gets the luxury suite because he is the one with the biggest jackpot. Decision makers Jeffrey & Niels must choose from Jeffrey & Linda who have as much money in their jackpot as second and third, which of them accompanies Mattheüs. They choose Jeffrey.

Sharice, who is a new fake housemate Nele, and Axel enter the house as new residents. Axel immediately declares that he is there to win, and this worries the other housemates. Axel and Sharice are that week's Decision Makers.

On Day 10, Axel gets the secret assignment to pick "Remi" in the game later. Just after that, he and "Nele" have to choose two residents for the Panic Room. This will be "Nele" and "Remi" - the two residents with fake identities. Unknown to the other residents, the Panic Room is filled with all sorts of props and information that the pair must rehearse about their fake identities. Meanwhile, the other residents play a game for money and have to unlock tubes. They win 6,000 euros. Afterwards, one by one in the Decision Room, the residents must choose how much money of this to put into their own jackpot. Not every resident chooses equally.

There is a new clothing token, and the group gives it to Milena. The Decision Makers buy food for 600 euros, they use a large amount from Matthew, Lennie and Linda and then small portions from the other residents.

On Day 11, there is a mysterious gold box in the living space. Matthew secretly takes it to the luxury suite. The Decision Makers must nominate 6 residents. They choose Jeffrey, Jolien, Jordy, Lennie, Niels and Remi. Nominated residents will be divided into pairs. These are Jeffrey & Lennie, Jolien & "Remi" and Jordy & Niels. 1 duo can clear themselves by completing a puzzle that must be correct on both sides. Jordy & Niels play themselves free.

Housemates are called individually to the Decision Room. They can buy a key to The Vault for 500 euros. Several housemates do this. Linda & Matthew buy game changers there but must keep this a secret. The golden box disappeared while residents went to the Decision Room. Unbeknownst to the group, Jeffrey took it to the luxury suite to which only he and Matthew have access.

During a game in the game room on Day 12 where those with nomination target must hold up a ball by two sticks, Jeffrey wins an exemption. However, he must pass on his nomination. He gives it to Linda. That night, the final nominees must go to the Decision Room and divide into pairs. These are Jolien & Lennie and Linda & Remi. For each duo, they must go to the gameroom and motivate to each other why they deserve an exemption while standing on a revolving platform. In the end, it is Lennie and Remi who get an exemption.

On Day 13, Big Brother calls the resident with the golden box to the diary room. Jeffrey who took this for Niels, gives it to him. In the diary room, Niels opens the box; he must nominate a fellow inmate. He chooses Elsa. On Day 14, Big Brother announces the nominees: Elsa, Jolien and Linda. The nominees are called to the Panic Room, where they record the Big Brother podcast. Meanwhile, Big Brother gives a clothing token. After some discussion, the group gives it to Keanu. Who at first does not want to accept it because the decision was not unanimous but then accepts it anyway.

On Day 15, Jeffrey, Jordy, Keanu and Mattheüs dive into the icy pond. That night is the Live Exit broadcast. Elsa is a viewer favorite and gets to stay first. Next, Jolien is rescued. Linda is the second housemate to leave the house.

Week 3 - Identity crisis
Jeffrey inherits the money from outvoted Linda on day 16. Jordy & Niels are the decision makers of the week after Jordy is designated by the group to stay in the luxury suite. They choose five residents - Elsa, Keanu, Milena, Nele and Niels - for the game in which the sitting area can be unlocked. The game in which a ball must be guided through a maze suspended in the air succeeds. The residents have sofas. That evening, the residents get their first Big Brother party in which they can dress up in their favorite celebrity. After the party, Big Brother asks if they enjoyed their new identities, and announces that they will all be asked an important question the following day.

On Day 17, each housemate is called into the diary room individually. They have to guess which of the two housemates has a fake identity. Jolien, who grew closer to Jeffrey over the past few days, gets scared that Jeffrey was playing a game with her. In the game room, the identity of the fake residents is revealed: Nele and Remi disappear and from now on become their real selves - Sharice and Wicky. For every non suspicion, they could win money. The other residents received money when they did make a correct guess. Sharice was not suspected by anyone and therefore wins 5000 euros. Jeffrey & Jolien are relieved that the budding feelings between them are real, and share a first kiss while the other residents are busy with Sharice & Wicky. Afterwards, all the residents play a game without Sharice & Wicky about the hobbies and interests of the two residents. Afterwards, Elsa has a hard time trusting Sharice and Wicky - because these are the residents she felt most comfortable with. Sharice tries to make it clear that their bond is genuine. The residents also discuss how they will divide the money they won. Keanu suggests dividing it fairly so that each resident earns 420 euros. Elsa says she did not know that last time Keanu took more. A small discussion ensues between the two.

On Day 18, Keanu addresses Elsa about their discussion but according to Elsa, it was just a joke on her part. Keanu does not believe this, however, it makes him insecure. The decision makers decide that Axel, Elsa, Milena, Niels and Sharice are the five residents they may choose to get their beds, on the basis that these are the residents who have the most back problems and Elsa is the oldest resident. The residents, however, must earn their beds themselves through a game in which they must make their way through bars to the bed token in the gameroom. Axel, Milena and Niels succeed in the game, and get a bed that they have to put together themselves.

The housemates are called individually to the decision room. Access to the vault and gamechangers can be purchased. After everyone has had their turn, Big Brother says that the safe is closed because it is empty - all gamechangers have been bought.

Axel has the flu and on Day 19 moves into the Panic Room which is set up as an infirmary. Lennie leaves the house for health reasons. The vending machinge gives the key to the phone booth. Big Brother announces that when it rings, the resident who answers can be given a question, a dilemma or a message. Niels answers first and has to designate residents for a game - he chooses those who do not yet have a bed. Jeffrey, Jolien, Jordy, Mattheüs, Sharice and Wicky play a guessing game with boxes full of pellets with which they can win things. Keanu wins his own bed by picking up the phone. In the evening, the phone rings. Jordy picks up and gets the message that he has an important decision to make with a fellow resident - Niels. Six residents have to get a nomination target. These will be Axel, Jeffrey, Keanu, Matthew, Sharice and Wicky.

The residents have to nominate on Day 20. Axel, Sharice and Wicky are the nominees. Jordy picks up the phone again and is given a choice: his closet or his own bed. He chooses his clothes. On day 21, Axel returns to the house; he is cured. That day, he and Sharice and Wicky go to the Panic Room for the podcast. Matthew answers the phone and also gets to choose between his bed and his closet. He misses his clothes and chooses this.

Mattheüs overhears a tactical conversation on Day 22 between Jordy and Niels who say they will nominate Jeffrey and Mattheüs every week. He immediately shares this with Elsa, Keanu and Jeffrey. Keanu thinks it's a dirty game. That night it is the Live Exit. Axel is exempted first. Sharice also gets to stay. Wicky has the fewest votes but in the diary room he is told by Big Brother that because of Lennie's voluntary exit he may stay, subject to a nomination for the following week and losing his purchased gamechangers. Elsa is thrilled that Wicky does not have to leave.

Week 4 - Business week
On Day 23, the housemates discover three new closets. These belong to new housemates David P, David S and Jane. They enter the house as directors of three companies. One by one, the housemates in the game room must apply for jobs with the three directors. It is up to the three directors to choose their four employees. The directors choose to split the groups and unions. David P's employees are Jolien, Milena, Niels and Wicky. From David S, these are Jeffrey, Keanu, Mattheüs and Sharice. And from Jane, these are Axel, Elsa & Jordy and an unknown housemate. The three directors are this week's decision makers. Because there are so many residents, the luxury suite disappears and becomes a second bedroom. The directors decide that the five women will sleep in this new bedroom. They also have to give a motivational speech to their teams that night. The women ask Jane how they come across on television. When she honestly says that many viewers find Jeffrey & Jolien's relationship cringe, and Mattheüs & Milena running after each other, both ladies react very emotionally to this.

Jane learns on Day 24 that her statements have caused tension with Jolien & Milena, and tries to discuss this with them. As of now, three housemates - 1 from each respective company - must also go to the Panic Room which is a workshop this week when the work signal sounds. There the housemates must carpenter birdhouses. For each house that is well put together, the company earns 5 euros.

On Day 25, the morning crew discovers a new housemate Eva, who is in company Jane, who is already working on a birdhouse. At the end of the day, Big Brother announces the results: a total of 62 houses have been made. 16 cottages by company David S, 21 cottages by company David P and 25 cottages by company Jane. Then the directors have to go public with the proceeds of their company and gamble who has the most popular company - here the viewer voted for. David S's company is the most popular, both Davids got this right and multiply their proceeds. Big Brother donates one birdhouse to the housemates, through an idea by Mattheüs, to hang it in the garden to give more opportunities to the city bird as well.

The house is filled with 15 housemates, Jordy & Niels have a hard time getting used to the crowds and find that many housemates have changed in behavior.

The directors are given another assignment. They can change team members but they refuse this. Big Brother says there is a game coming up where the companies play against each other. The winning company wins something big, the losing team will lose heavily. Each company must designate a key person. For company David P this is Sharice, for company David S Jolien and for company Jane Elsa. A balancing game is played. Jane's company wins. As a result, she gets to give an exemption to one of her workers, and gives it to Mattheüs. The company of David P loses. He has to give a nomination, and gives this to Niels.

Day 26 the companies play a game against each other. David P's company wins, because of this David P, Jolien and Wicky get their own bed - Niels and Milena already have this. Jolien picks up the ringing phone and can give a closet to someone, she gives this to herself and can't contain her joy. The directors are called to the Decision Room and have to make a guess whose company has gone up the most, each director chooses his personal company. The team with the most money wins an exemption, which is the company of David S. The remaining nomination target pins are for the housemates who do not have an exemption pin. The directors must give these to Axel, Jolien, Jordy & Milena.

The housemates must nominate on Day 27 and choose between those with the target pins. Jordy confesses to Jolien that he played the game too sweetly and will do things differently starting next week. Afterwards, he also complains to Wicky that some residents who say they should be fair are not fair themselves in distributing food and sneak away and eat portions of food. On Day 28, the nominees are announced. These are Axel, Jordy, Niels and Wicky.

The evening of Day 29 is the Live. Axel and Jordy are secured first. Next, Wicky appears on the screen. Niels has the fewest votes and with leave the house. For Jordy this comes hard that he loses his friend in the house.

Week 5 - Duo week
That night, Big Brother surprises the residents with a party. After weeks of living on rations, the alcohol quickly affects some residents. Jolien gets very physical toward Jeffrey, who in turn does not forget that there are cameras. Milena constantly seeks out Matthew, but Sharice keeps an eye out. The morning after on Day 30, Milena is ashamed of what happened. Jeffrey is angry with Jolien and her; he feels they did not behave.

The residents learn in the game room that this week they are playing in duos - duos put together by the viewer. These are Jane & Jeffrey, Axel & Jolien, Elsa & Milena, Jordy & Matthew, David & Keanu, David P & Wicky and Eva & Sharice. Eva & Sharice are the decision makers, they get to sleep in the bridal suite with another couple. They choose Elsa & Milena. The duos are instructed to get to know each other better quickly. Afterwards, Big Brother questions them about their favorite food. Everyone knows their duo partner's favorite food, except Jeffrey. As a result, everyone wins a luxurious dinner except the duo Jane & Jeffrey.

Day 31, the phone rings. David P answers. He is instructed to choose 1 duo not to play in the next game: he chooses Jordy & Matthew. The other duos play a nomination game. The winning duo, Elsa and Milena, wins an exemption. Elsa donates it to Milena. The losing duo, Jane & Jeffrey, wins a nomination. The pair sit in the diary room for quite some time and don't get out who will and should take the nomination. Jane decides to be the bigger person and takes the nomination pin. Jeffrey wants to hug her but she turns that down.

Jordy answers the phone on Day 32, he has to switch duo partners. He chooses Jeffrey. Jane & Matthew make up the other new duo. The duos once again compete against each other via a puzzle. David & Keanu win, and David grants Keanu the exemption. Elsa & Milena lose. Since Milena has an exemption, this automatically nominates Elsa. Milena feels very guilty because of this. The same day the residents can buy back gamechangers, which Axel, Jane, Jolien and Keanu do. A discussion breaks out about the order in which the residents went into the decision room for the gamechangers. The parrot in the hallway copies some statements made by residents about other residents in the house. This causes a stir. Eva & Sharice get to hand out a clothing token as decision makers. Sharice chooses for herself. Jeffrey, who is the only original resident who does not yet have his closet, finds this very selfish.

On Day 33, 1 resident per duo plays a balancing game. Axel and Jolien win, and Axel gets the exemption. Eva & Sharice lose, and Eva takes the nomination. Eva pretends not to mind this, so as not to make Sharice feel bad, but she really regrets her nomination. The decision makers have to make new duos, these are: Axel & Jane, David & David P, Elsa & Keanu, Eva & Milena, Jeffrey & Jolien, Jordy & Matthew and Sharice & Wicky. Everyone is happy with their duo, except Jeffrey. He thinks Jolien and he will now be a target. Sharice has also relinquished her decision maker pin to Eva's new duo partner, Milena. The duos play another game in which they must take a symbol in a chapel without seeing it from each other. They can win money or an exemption if they choose the same symbol. David P, Jordy and Wicky win an exemption, the other duos win nothing. Jeffrey and Jolien don't win anything either despite the fact that Jeffrey had said beforehand that he would always go for an exemption, but he himself did otherwise. Jolien is surprised; according to Jeffrey, it was a mistake on his part.

Day 34, the residents get the final assignment as duos: nominate in duo. The following day, Day 35, it turns out that the nominees are Elsa, Eva, Jane and Jeffrey. Jeffrey is the only one nominated by the group and not by a game. After the nominations are announced, he says he was negative last week but will recover. Keanu feels a distance from Jordy and speaks to him about it, but Jordy says there is nothing wrong. Keanu is having a hard time with this. Jordy also has a hard time with the conversation; he sometimes thinks it is a mental institution where it is constantly about emotions. David P picks up the phone and is given a secret task that must be done in 15 minutes and which allows the garden furniture to be played free: this requires two residents to change clothes, collect all the cushions in the sitting area, all the tree trunks in the storage room, and two residents to imitate a flamingo in the pond. David P involves all the residents so the mission is soon no longer secret, and it fails. On day 36, it's the next Live. Elsa is exempted first, Eva second and Jane last. Jeffrey has to leave the house. He has a hard time with this and is sorry that the viewer punished him after a week according to him.

Week 6 - Big Brother Games
After Jeffrey leaves, Axel, David, David P, Eva, Jane, Milena, Sharice and Wicky have to go to the decision room for inheritance. They each receive 68 euros. The same evening, Big Brother announces the Big Brother games: the residents must put on their sports clothes and go to the game area where there are fitness machines for a sports marathon. There they have to exercise for money. On day 37, the money is distributed in the decision room; the residents divide it fairly. That morning there was also a trophy saying "Who deserves me" in the living room. The residents give it to Elsa. As a result, she is Game Captain of the Big Brother Games. Her first assignment is to choose two residents to play a game: she chooses David S and Mathëus. They play a surfing game that allows them to win money for the other residents. During the failure of their game, they had deployed residents Jolien & Wicky. They have to play a game for the nominations because of this. A lengthy assignment also starts: the residents must keep a fire burning in the garden until when Big Brother indicates that the assignment is over.

On Day 38, Jolien and Wicky play the nomination game where a maze is built in the game room, and a slide in the game area. Jolien overwhelmingly wins the game making Wicky nominated. Elsa can buy the weekly basics in the decision room as game captain and chooses the menu with the tacos. She then buys all the goodies which suddenly gives the residents some luxury food. A basketball game also starts where during a signal 1 resident must go to the game area and has two minutes to score a goal in the basketball goal. There is something valuable in return. The residents rank who goes to the game area and when. That night, Jolien receives a letter and sweater from Jeffrey. She gets emotional about this but it does her good. Tired, the residents give up the fire assignment.

David S answers the phone on Day 39. He hears that three clothing tokens are hidden in the house. He turns on David P. They find two tokens that they keep for themselves for their clothes. Keanu finds the last token in his closet and gives it to Elsa. Elsa, as game captain, gets to divide the group into three teams for a new game. Group 1 is Axel, Jordy, Keanu & Matthew. Group 2 Jane, Jolien, Milena & Sharice and group 3 David P, David S, Eva and Wicky. In the game, the residents must compete against each other via a dart game and ball game. The order in which they drop out determines which medal (and prize attached to it) they will receive. The standings are as follows for Group 1: 1. Matthew 2. Jordy 3. Keanu 4. Axel For group 2: 1. Sharice 2. Jolien 3. Milena 4. Jane and for group 3: 1. David P 2. Eva 3. David S 4. Wicky. Wicky is given a task to get rid of his nomination. This requires riding one of the two bikes in the gameroom for 12 hours straight. He enlists the help of his fellow residents who are all willing to help. In pairs, the residents cycle all night. The task is accomplished and Wicky loses his nomination.

On Day 40, residents can go individually to the decision room. There they cannot buy game changers this time but medals from the vault. So many medals are bought that not everyone has a chance to buy one because the vault is empty. That night the nomination alarm sounds. The residents must go together to the game room where they must openly nominate each other by handing over medals. Jordy gets 10 medals in total from the other residents but by deploying his game changer the rebounder, everyone gets them back. Jane, Jolien, Keanu, Matthëus and Sharice are nominated.

Day 41 nominees can choose a fellow inmate to compete for them in a gun game. Game captain Elsa determines the order in which the nominees can choose someone. Sharice goes for David S, Jane for Axel, Matthew for Jordy, Jolien for Elsa, Keanu chooses David P. In the game room, the chosen residents have to motivate why the nominee should get an exemption. Jordy is surprised when Elsa and David P immediately choose Sharice and not the residents who chose them. Sharice gets the exemption as a result. Afterwards, there is a discussion with all the residents when Jordy shares his dissatisfaction, according to him, Jolien should have received a nomination. He feels that Elsa did not even bother to compete for Jolien. Jolien is disappointed because she feels she has already done so much for the group and has already given both Lennie and Wicky an exemption. Elsa tries to talk it out with her and says that she chose Sharice purely because of a prior agreement.

Valentine's Day is celebrated on Day 42 and residents discover loving messages from David P. Parrot Peter received a Valentine's Day card. The residents also individually play a game for cards from fans, a letter home or a Valentine balloon in the decision room. Only Elsa, Matthëus, Milena and Sharice play the game tactically smart and receive their fan letters, the rest have only balloons. The nominees are officially announced: these are Jolien, Keanu and Matthëus.

On day 43, Wicky receives sad family news. Due to a death, he immediately leaves the house after an emotional goodbye from his fellow inmates. However, the Live and Exit that night continue. Jolien is exempted first and is visibly surprised by this. Next, Matthëus is exempt which forces Keanu to leave the house. David S, however, announces that none of the nominees should leave the house. He is homesick for home and for his children and agreed with Big Brother that day that he will leave voluntarily instead of the resident with the fewest votes. David S says goodbye and goes home.

Week 7 - Teams week
Immediately after the Live, Big Brother calls a resident to the decision room. Jane volunteers. She gets there a basket of apples and one poisonous apple. She has to distribute the apples to the residents. She gives the poison apple to Sharice. Afterwards, all the residents are called to the gameroom with the apples. Sharice must leave the gameroom but pass the poisonous apple to another resident. This continues until Milena is the last one left with the poison apple. She is allowed to open it, the pins of decision maker and an exemption are inside. These are for Milena.

The morning of Day 44, the residents celebrate Eva's birthday. Decision maker Milena has to divide the residents into two teams. Team pink = David, Eva, Jane, Jordy and Sharice. Team green = Axel, Elsa, Jolien, Keanu & Matthew. The teams play an initial battle - a game of tennis which is won by team green.

On day 45, the day starts with a secret assignment by Jolien, who was allowed to engage 1 resident - Keanu - for this purpose. She gives an aerobics session and everyone participates making the assignment successful. The residents win a deluxe breakfast. There is also a button and flashing light in the living space. Parrot Peter warns to keep an eye on this one. Eva receives sad news and leaves the house due to family circumstances. Milena takes her place on team pink, but remains exempt. Decision maker Milena buys pasta as weekly basics and buys all the luxuries including a bread machine, a cheese night and a gourmet night. The second battle is played: a karaoke contest. This time team pink wins.

Day 46 starts with the final and defining battle: a puzzle. Each team must designate two residents. For team rose this is Jane and Jordy, and for team green Axel & Jolien. Team rose wins. Since Axel is slower than Jolien in solving the puzzle, he is automatically nominated. The rest of the green team is nomination target. Team rose divides the 15,000 euros won. The residents still have to nominate one of the nomination targets that day. A game is also played in the Panic Room by two residents who must know the group well, Elsa and Sharice are chosen. They can find residents' personal items linked to descriptions in a junk room during a certain time. They find the personal objects of all the residents, except Jordy, in time. Big Brother announces the nominees: Axel, Elsa and Sharice. That night the phone rings, Axel answers and gets to choose some residents to go with him to the Big Brother Spa in the game area. These are David, Elsa, Jane and Jolien.

The flashing light goes off on the morning of Day 47, and Axel pushes the button. He has to choose two residents competing for an exemption, and chooses Jane and Sharice. The pair duel and Sharice wins the exemption. On Day 48, the residents unexpectedly have to nominate for a second time. There is a tie so decision maker Milena must exempt someone. Jane addresses Milena and Sharice in group at night. Sharice drank Jane's iced coffee the night before. Jane has been noticing bullying behavior from them for several weeks. Milena and Sharice deny this and say it was all jokes, but Jolien also says that they had been addressed by the group before about their whispering behavior. A real discussion ensues. A little later, Milena also addresses Matthew about this, but that too degenerates into a discussion when Matthew says to Milena that she sees things that are not there.

On Day 49, the final nominees are announced: these are Axel, Elsa, Jordy & Keanu. Jordy explodes when he finds Sharice pretending to be a victim in a group. Jane and Milena also have another discussion about last night's incident. Sharice thinks about going home. The phone rings twice. Axel answers the first and learns that there are two hidden clothing tokens. These are found and Axel & Jane are the last to open their closet. David answers the second phone. He needs to get all the residents into the garden in swimwear and with construction helmets. This succeeds and a sauna with crane is loaded into the garden.

On Day 50, Sharice enters the conversation with Jane and the pair talk the discussion out. During the Live that night, Jordy is exempted first, then Keanu and Axel last. To everyone's surprise, Elsa, the mom of the group, is voted out. The whole group cries or has a hard time saying goodbye to her.

Week 8 - Temptation week
Jolien, Jordy, Keanu, Matthew and Milena have to go to the decision room for Elsa's inheritance. Immediately after, parrot Peter announces that the viewer has decided. Jolien, Jordy and Matthew are called to the decision room: the viewer has decided that they are team captains this week. The team captains put together the following teams: team pink led by Jolien with Axel & Jane, team blue led by Mattheüs with Milena & Sharice, team purple led by Jordy with David & Keanu. In the game room, each team must sign a contract worth 10,000 euros if they resist the temptations. When there are bubbles and snacks in the decision room, the housemates dare not take them until when Big Brother indicates that these are not temptations, and they may simply consume them. On Day 51, the teams play the first game. One person from each team must make the highest possible tower out of objects in the game room. David, Jane and Matthew play the game. Jane loses and gets a nomination target for her team; she takes this herself. David wins and gets an exemption target for his team; he gives it to himself. The richest housemates from each team get to sleep in the suite this week and get a Japanese dinner that night. These are David, Jane and Milena.

On Day 52, Jordy picks up the phone. He has to go to the Panic Room and is tempted there with all the mail his fans had sent for Valentine's Day. Jordy responds to this causing his contract to be dissolved. Jordy is thrilled when he reads all his fan mail. A game is also played for gamechangers with one person from each team. These are Axel, Jordy and Milena. It is a bluff game with numbered blocks where two players must convince the other which block they placed. Jordy knows how to bluff best, winning two gamechangers, Axel wins 1 and Milena none. Both Axel and Jordy keep the game changers for themselves and do not donate them to anyone else on their team. Axel wins the gamechanger double vote. Jane and Axel discuss the game changers and the upcoming nominations. Jane plays doubles and gets information both from Jordy's group and from Axel. An envelope comes out of the vending machine stating that 1 housemate must go to the panic room: Keanu. That one is not to be tempted.

A new bluff game on Day 53 in which 1 member of each team must convince the others whether there is nomination target in their box. Jolien, Keanu and Sharice play the game. Jolien loses and gets a nomination target, which she takes herself. Sharice loses twice and gets two nomination targets. One she keeps for herself and the other she gives to Matthew. The vault is open. Jordy hurries and goes first. He buys the new gamechangers the green and red saboteur that he has to use this week. He is happy with this and confides to his group of Jolien, Keanu and Matthew - which they call the Keanu cartel - that he will use it to turn the entire nominations upside down. Once again there is an envelope in the vending machine, Milena goes to the panic room this time but doesn't respond to the temptation either. Jane picks up the phone and has to designate someone to make an important decision in the diary room: Axel. Axel has to give a nomination target to someone; he chooses Jordy. Jordy is angry at Jane for choosing Axel and says her action will put her on the nomination bench.

On day 54, David dissolves his contract for a letter from his pregnant girlfriend. There is also a new red button in the living space. By pushing the button for 3hours within a certain period of time, three residents - David, Jane and Matthew - can collect seals to unlock the second part of the kitchen. They succeed in their task and the kitchen is now entirely at their disposal. A first Freeze is played. Sharice's grandmother walks into the house with a homemade cake. Despite all the emotions, Sharice and Milena remain frozen, as do the other housemates making the mission successful.

On day 55, Jordy deploys his new gamechangers. With the red saboteur, he takes away his nomination target. With the green saboteur, he gives Matthew's nomination target to Milena. Immediately after, the nomination targets are announced. The housemates - except Jordy's group that was already informed - are very surprised. The residents have to nominate after it. Sharice thinks that if Milena had to leave, she herself would go with her. On Day 56, the nominees are announced: Jane, Milena and Sharice. Big Brother puts the housemates to work: they have to completely clean the house. As a reward, they get mirrors in the house.

On Day 57, the nominees record a podcast. That night, it's the Live exit. Sharice is exempted first, then Jane. Milena is the one who got the fewest votes. She is grateful for the friendship she got with Sharice but is happy to get back to her kids.

Week 9 - Fan week
After Milena leaves, all remaining housemates inherit her money. The same evening, audio messages from fans are played for the housemates. After it, the housemates have to go to the gameroom which is set up as a cinema, there they get to see movies from their fans. In the decision room there are crafts made by the fans. Big Brother announces that it is fan week. From the morning of Day 58, the day starts with parrot Peter repeating a tweet from fans, which he does throughout fan week. The phone rings and Matthew answers. It is the fans who are nearby to play a game. In the gameroom, housemates must individually play a game with three fans; through questions, they must find out who their fan is. David, Jordy & Keanu don't find their fan, the other housemates do and earn money in the process. This week the viewers are the decision makers. They determine the weekly menu.

On Day 59, Jolien and Keanu are chosen by viewers to play a game in the panic room. The pair see pictures during their stay with symbols. The other housemates must recognize these symbols in the house through a depiction of fans on screens. Using these symbols, Jolien & Keanu must form a word: vending machine. It is a tip-off for this pair. They conceal this from the other residents. With the game there is 1,300 euros won that must be divided. Jordy goes into the decision room first, says he feels like some excitement, and takes 1,293 euros for himself and leaves the remaining 7 euros for the other seven residents. Axel is not pleased with Jordy's action and is determined to play the game harder now, too. In the gameroom, there are objects from fans who sent them in to pimp. Each housemate must choose an object, and now has 48h to pimp this object. This is both during the day and night, the residents take turns, the housemates may only go to the panic room to do this when the alarm sounds.

On day 60, Jolien and Keanu find two gamechangers "double voice" in the vending machine. They give this information only to Jordy and Mattheüs. The housemates play a money game in which they have to answer residents' questions. During the evening there is a special Freeze, shlager singer Marco Schuitmaker - of whom Jordy is a fan - arrives in the house and sings his most famous song. The housemates remain silent, silent making the assignment successful. As a result, they get to apres-ski party as a reward.

On day 61, the housemates get the results of a ranking that fans did about these housemates. The day before, residents had to do this about themselves. When the results match, the residents earn money. There are strong differences: for example, according to fans, Mattheüs does a lot in the household while according to his fellow residents he hardly does anything, and Jane does much more in the household than what the fans tell her. For Axel and Sharice, it is clear that fans of the "cartel" voted Jolien, Jordy, Keanu and Mattheüs in particular. Jordy tries to persuade Jane to vote for Axel in the next nominations, but she says she will never do so since Axel is her buddy. The fans judge the pimped items of the housemate. As a result, Jane gets 4 parts of an exemption, Axel 2, and David and Mattheüs 1 each.

Day 62 begins with Axel, David, Jane and Mattheüs having to go to the game room: there they have to divide the pieces of exemption so that two housemates have two exemptions. It seems most fair to everyone that Jane keep her full exemption. There is a discussion about the other parts. Axel who already has half gets the other two pieces and promises to Mattheüs not to vote for him this week. The nomination alarm goes off. Axel deploys his gamechanger "censorship" on Jordy preventing him from nominating. The nominees are announced: these are Jolien, Jordy & Keanu. Mattheüs did not save any of his cartel friends. It is clear to the group that Jane has nominated them as well. Jordy is very angry about this, Jolien thinks that Jane played double game, but according to Jane, they only used her as a pawn and would eventually also sacrifice her first to get on with the four of them. Jordy and Axel have a discussion, according to Axel Jordy is a bad loser.

On Day 63 in the decision room, housemates must link the past week's tweets to a housemate for money. Sharice does not understand the hate tweets. Day 64, the cartel tries to convince Sharice to cooperate with them during subsequent nominations. During the Live, Jolien is exempted first and then Jordy. Keanu has to leave the house for good this time. He would recommend the experiment to anyone because he got to know himself better.

Week 10 - Money week
The housemates receive the very last inheritance of the season. The same night a game is played, the housemates win cash amounts but they cannot win the exemption. On day 65, David picks up the phone. He hears that entrance tickets are coming for the money printing shop. Axel & Jane are called to the decision room as the two richest residents, where they are presented with the proposal to buy the decision makers pin. They do so and are decision makers that week. They lie to the other residents that they have been chosen by the viewer as decision makers. Each resident must take turns in the decision room and can put an amount from their own jackpot into a treasure chest to avoid nomination. Axel, David, Jane, Jolien and Sharice play a game for money. Axel wins and the other residents have to pay the amount of money to him. Axel & Jane buy the weekly basics with the money from Jolien, Jordy and Mattheüs as revenge on Jordy. Jordy cannot hold back his tears that night. Sharice comforts him and tells him not to doubt himself. Jane makes a reconciliation attempt between Axel and Jordy.

On Day 66, David and Sharice find the tickets for the money printing shop, and go there first. The housemates can buy game tickets in the decision room: Jane buys two for Axel and herself, Jolien buys two for Matthew and herself. In the game, they have to bring water to an aquarium with an object. Jane is the fastest and wins 3,500 euros. A lengthy money game starts where two housemates must constantly watch out for money rolling off the construction in the garden, this money they must collect and counts as a personal jackpot. Jordy & Sharice go to the money printing shop together. Sharice donates all the printed money to Jordy who barely has anything left. David tries to convince Sharice to nominate Axel & Jane this week to secure themselves. Jordy has been given a secret assignment by the viewer. He gets to steal an amount in the treasury, he steals the highest amount - Jane's which is 3,500 euros.

The housemates play a water game on Day 67. Jolien wins an exemption, but it is clear to Axel and Jane that David and Sharice were playing against them, joining the "cartel." Axel & Jane go to the money printing shop. The residents may put a second bid into the treasure chest. Day 68 is the end of the treasury. Jane has the last amount in the treasury and is nominated, Jordy the highest giving him an exemption. Axel thinks Jordy is having a very easy time this week and is getting everything almost as a gift.

On the morning of Day 69, the money game goes awry, as Mattheüs puts away a money coin, and Axel and Jane are about to redeem him & Jolien, a coin drops. This subtracts 500 euros from everyone's jackpot. None of the residents feel they are to blame for this, and there is a discussion about who is to blame. During the day the residents have to nominate, and a little later it is announced that the nominees are Axel, Jane and Sharice. David is surprised because he had asked the "cartel" to nominate him. But according to Jordy & co, Sharice is more popular in the outside world and they did this to get Axel or Jane to go home. Jane crashes after the nominations. She misses her home.

Day 70 ends the money game. David picks up the phone and is given a secret assignment that all housemates must participate in to unlock the garden furniture, which succeeds. The nominees record the podcast. Jane gets burned in the sauna on Day 71. During the Live, Sharice is exempted first. Axel has the fewest votes and has to leave the house. He is glad he really played the game. Jane is inconsolable.

Week 11 - Partners week
Immediately after Axel's exit, a dilemma awaits the housemates in the game room. There is 1 semifinal ticket. If a housemate takes it, the remaining housemates must sleep in the gameroom. If a housemate leaves the gameroom and does not take the ticket, they can take money in the decision room. Jolien, David, Matthew and Jane choose to take the money. Jordy & Sharice remain in the game room. Jordy takes the semifinal ticket, and is therefore exempt that week. Sharice has nothing and has to be the only one in the game room to sleep while the other housemates get a party. Jane thinks it's weak of Jordy.

Day 72 Sharice returns to the house. She finds Jordy's action selfish. Because Jordy is sure of a spot the next week, he is decision maker. Via cupcakes, the residents learn who they should play in duo with this week: David & Mattheüs, Jane & Jordy and Jolien & Sharice. The money of the persons in duo is added together. During the week, Big Brother plays the laughter of a family member or friend of the housemates. When a housemate guesses the laugh correctly, after pressing the red button, this duo earns 500 euros. If wrong, 200 euros goes from the duo money pot. The laughter of family and friends bring emotions to the housemates. A first duo game is played. David & Mattheüs win 5,000 euros for their jackpot. Parrot Peter betrays that food has been stolen: Jordy, Jolien and Mattheüs return only a part of the stolen food. Every night a duo must prepare a meal chosen by the viewer.

The housemates learn on Day 73 that they must perform in duo and will be judged on this by the viewer. There is an auction for personal items, groceries and a freeze. For both Matthew and Jane, there is nothing from their partner which makes them suspect that their relationships ended during their Big Brother stay. After the auction, the pair seek solace with each other. Jordy is given a secret assignment by the viewers: he must get every resident to say the word "train," make sure a fellow resident puts on his stockings & shoes, eat SLOB for lunch with someone, and get Jane & Sharice to talk about former housemate Fleur. Jordy succeeds in the task and wins money in the process. The housemates get a silent disco that night. Mattheüs gets a secret assignment from the viewers during the disco and is able to smuggle money away from the decision room. That night, Jolien and Mattheüs cuddle intimately in the bedroom.

During day 74 Jordy receives a letter from home, bought in the auction. There is a second duo game, a puzzle, which is won by Jane & Jordy who win 15,000 euros with it, the second duo Jolien and Sharice get 10,000 euros. That evening there is the first duo performance: Jolien and Sharice perform as B2, an imitation of K3, with a song lyrics about Big Brother. Day 75 starts Jordy with a morning mood. He sleeps in the suite with Jane this week but can barely sleep because of her snoring, and refuses to sleep there anymore. Jane gets an audio message from her mother, purchased at the auction. The housemates get a barbecue for dinner. Sharice has a secret assignment: she has to make every housemate take a cold shower. She manages to get Jolien and Jane's leg under a cold shower, together with herself this is 2.5 housemates according to Big Brother. Who rounds this up giving Sharice 600 euros. It is the second duo performance, by David and Mattheüs, they do a roast about the Big Brother housemates.

On Day 76, Sharice receives a video message from her sister thanks to the auction. A third game in duo is played: a game of hide-and-seek via the cameras in the house. The nominees are announced, only Jordy who has a semifinal ticket is not nominated. The other five housemates are automatically nominated: David, Jane, Jolien, Mattheüs and Sharice. Jolien's freeze, purchased during the auction, takes place. It is Jolien's mother who comes to visit. After greeting her daughter, Sharice breaks the freeze and tells Jolien to hug her mother. Jolien and her mother hug tightly. With each duo, 1,000 euros goes from the pot because of this but that doesn't bother anyone.

Day 77 starts with Jordy having breakfast in bed that he bought during the auction, and that Mattheüs has to deliver to him. Jolien worries because her mother didn't say anything about Jeffrey during the freeze, Jolien becomes uncertain about their relationship. A first plane flies over the house with a message for Jane: "we got you baby Jane." That evening there is the final duo performance - by Jane and Jordy. They perform a play with vocals inspired by The Greatest Showman.

On Day 78, it becomes clear which performance was best liked by viewers: David & Mattheüs received 10,000 euros, Jolien & Sharice 12,500 euros and Jane & Jordy 15,000 euros. This puts an end to the duos. The duo jackpots are automatically split into two equal parts. Sharice thinks she has to leave the house that night and writes goodbye bills for her fellow housemates. During the Live exit, Jolien & Sharice are told first that they are going to the semifinals. Next, Matthew gets some good news. Jane is the last one who gets to go to the semifinals. It is David who has the fewest votes and has to leave the house.

== Episodes ==
No. overall	No. in season	Title	Day(s)	Original release date
Week 1 - Launch week
305	1	"Episode 1 - Launch"	Day 1	January 6, 2025
306	2	"Episode 2"	Day 2	January 7, 2025

== Nominations table ==
Housemates from The Netherlands
Housemates from Belgium

	Week 1	Week 2	Week 3	Week 4	Week 5	Week 6	Week 7		Week 8	Week 9	Week 10	Week 11	Week 12	Week 13		
	Week 1	Week 2	Week 3	Week 4	Week 5	Week 6	Day 46	Day 48	Week 8	Week 9	Week 10	Week 11	Week 12	Day 91	Final	
Jordy	Elsa; Fleur; Milena	No; Nominations	Axel; Sharice; Wicky	Axel; Milena	Sharice	David S Elsa; Sharice Gamechanger: Axel; David P Elsa 3x Eva 2x Jane	Elsa	David P	Jane; Milena; Sharice	No; Nominations	No; Nominations	Jane; Sharice		Nominated	Winner (Day 92)	
Mattheüs	Fleur; Jordy; Milena	No; Nominations	Axel; Sharice; Wicky	Axel; Jordy	Sharice	Sharice 4x	Elsa	David P	Jane; Milena; Sharice	David; Keanu; Sharice		No; Nominations	Jane; Sharice	Nominated	Runner-Up (Day 92)	
Sharice	Not in house	Jeffrey; Jolien; Jordy; Lennie; Niels; Wicky	Axel; Jeffrey; Keanu	Axel; Jordy	Jeffrey	Mattheüs 2x	Jolien	Jordy	Jane; Jolien; Milena	Jolien; Jordy; Keanu		No; Nominations	Jolien; Mattheüs	Nominated	Third Place (Day 92)	
Jolien	No; Nominations	Nominated	Axel; Sharice; Wicky	Axel; Jordy	Sharice	Sharice 3x	Elsa	David P	Jane; Milena; Sharice	David; Keanu; Sharice	No; Nominations	Jane; Sharice		Evicted (Day 91)		
Jane	Not in house			Jolien; Milena	Jeffrey	~~Jordy~~	Jolien	David P	Jolien; Milena; Sharice	Jolien; Jordy; Keanu	No; Nominations	No; Nominations	Jolien; Mattheüs	Evicted (Day 85)		
David P	Not in house			Axel; Jordy	Jeffrey	Jolien; ~~Jordy~~; Mattheüs	Mattheüs	Jordy	Jolien; Milena; Sharice	Jolien; Jordy; Keanu		No; Nominations	Evicted (Day 78)			
Axel	Not in house	Jeffrey; Jolien; Jordy; Lennie; Niels; Wicky	Jeffrey; Keanu; Sharice	Jordy; Milena	Jeffrey	Jolien; ~~Jordy~~; Mattheüs	Mattheüs	Jordy	Jolien; Milena; Sharice	Jolien; Jordy; Keanu		Evicted (Day 71)				
Keanu	Fleur; Jordy; Milena	No; Nominations	Axel; Sharice; Wicky	Axel; Jordy	Jolien	David P Jordy	Elsa	David P	Jane; Milena; Sharice	David; Jordy; Sharice	Evicted (Day 64)					
Milena	Elsa; Jordy; Keanu	No; Nominations	Axel; Keanu; Wicky	Axel; Jordy	Jeffrey	Jane 3x Keanu 4x	Elsa	Jordy	Jane; Jolien; Sharice	Evicted (Day 57)						
Elsa	Fleur; Jordy; Milena	Nominated	Axel; Keanu; Sharice	Jordy; Milena	Jolien	~~Jordy 3x~~	Jolien	Jordy	Evicted (Day 50)							
Eva	Not in house			Axel; Jordy	Jeffrey	Jolien; ~~Jordy 2x~~ Mattheüs 2x	Walked (Day 45)									
David S	Not in house			Axel; Jordy	Jeffrey	Jolien	Walked (Day 43)									
Wicky	No; Nominations	No; Nominations	Axel; Jeffrey ?	Jordy; Milena	Jeffrey	David S Keanu	Walked (Day 43)									
Jeffrey	Elsa; Fleur; Jordy	Linda	Axel; Sharice; Wicky	Axel; Jordy	Sharice	Evicted (Day 35)										
Niels	Elsa; Fleur; Milena	Elsa	Keanu; Mattheüs; Wicky	Axel; Milena	Evicted (Day 29)											
Lennie	Elsa; Jordy; Milena	No; Nominations	Walked (Day 19)													
Linda	Fleur; Keanu; Milena	Nominated	Evicted (Day 15)													
Fleur	Elsa; Jordy; Keanu	Evicted (Day 8)														
Notes				1	2	3			4	5	6		7			
Source																
Decision maker	Jeffrey; Niels	Axel; Sharice	Jordy; Niels	David P David S Jane	Eva; Milena	Elsa	Milena			viewers	Axel; Jane	Jordy	Jolien; Mattheüs			
Immunity winner		Jeffrey; Jordy; Lennie; Niels; Wicky		Elsa; Jeffrey; Keanu; Mattheüs; Sharice	Axel; David P Jordy; Keanu; Wicky		Milena	Milena; Sharice		Axel; Jane		Jordy	Jordy			
Nomination target	Elsa; Fleur; Jordy; Keanu; Milena	Jeffrey; Jolien; Jordy; Lennie; Niels; Wicky	Axel; Jeffrey; Keanu; Mattheüs; Sharice; Wicky	Axel; Jolien; Jordy; Milena			Elsa; Jolien; Mattheüs		Jane; Jolien; ~~Jordy~~; ~~Mattheüs~~; Milena; Sharice							
Against public vote	Fleur; Jordy; Milena	Elsa; Jolien; Linda	Axel; Sharice; Wicky	Axel; Jordy; Niels; Wicky	Elsa; Eva; Jane; Jeffrey	Jolien; Keanu; Mattheüs; ~~Sharice~~	Axel; Elsa; Keanu	Axel; Elsa; Jordy; Keanu	Jane; Milena; Sharice	Jolien; Jordy; Keanu	Axel; Jane; Sharice	David P Jane; Jolien; Mattheüs; Sharice	Jane; ~~Mattheüs~~; Sharice	Jolien; Jordy; Mattheüs; Sharice	Jordy; Mattheüs; Sharice	
Walked	none		Lennie	none		Wicky; David S	Eva	none								
Evicted	Fleur; Fewest votes to save	Linda; Fewest votes to save	Wicky; Fewest votes to save	Niels; Fewest votes to save	Jeffrey; Fewest votes to save	Keanu; Fewest votes to save	Elsa; Fewest votes to save		Milena; Fewest votes to save	Keanu; Fewest votes to save	Axel; Fewest votes to save	David P Fewest votes to save	Jane; Fewest votes to save	Jolien; Fewest votes to save	Sharice; Fewest votes to win	Mattheüs; Fewest votes to win
Evicted	Fleur; Fewest votes to save	Linda; Fewest votes to save	Wicky; Fewest votes to save	Niels; Fewest votes to save	Jeffrey; Fewest votes to save	Keanu; Fewest votes to save	Elsa; Fewest votes to save		Milena; Fewest votes to save	Keanu; Fewest votes to save	Axel; Fewest votes to save	David P Fewest votes to save	Jane; Fewest votes to save	Jolien; Fewest votes to save	Jordy; Most votes to win	
Source																

=== Notes ===
- ^1 : Wicky, who received the smallest votes to stay in week 3, could stay because of the voluntarily exit of Lennie, but was automatically nominated in week 4. Niels wad automatically nominated by losing a balancing game.
- ^2 : Elsa, Eva and Jane were automatically nominated by taking the nomination badge after losing tasks in duo.
- ^3 : By deploying the gamechanger "the rebounder," all votes on Jordy were undone and returned from who they came from.
- ^4 : Jordy used two gamechangers: the red saboteur to replace Mattheüs by Milena as nomination target, and the green saboteur to remove himself as nomination target.
- ^5 : because Axel deployed the gamechanger "censorship" on Jordy, the latter could not nominate.
- ^6 : because Jordy deployed the gamechanger "censorship" on Jane, the latter could not nominate.
- ^7 : decision makers Jolien & Mattheüs had to put 1 of themselves on the nomination bench. Mattheüs chose himself. He bought himself an exemption afterwards, thus undoing his nomination.
