= Local origination =

In broadcasting, local origination may refer to:

- community radio
- community television
- local insertion
- local programming
- public-access television
