= Local programming =

The terms local programme, local programming, local content or local television refers to a television program made by a television station or independent television producer for broadcast only within the station's transmission area or television market. Local programmes can encompass the whole range of programme genres but will usually only cover subjects or people of particular interest to an audience within the station's coverage area.

For example, a local sports programme will present results, interviews and coverage of games or matches, just like a network sports programme, but it would only feature teams and players from within the broadcaster's transmission area.

In some cases a television network programme may include a local element as well. This is particularly the case in the United Kingdom and still happens today with Politics Show. The BBC regions will all opt-out at the same time from the main programme to present a locally produced segment.

Sometimes locally made programmes that are not too specific to the transmission area, will be sold to other local stations for broadcast in their region.

Historically there was a large percentage of local programming on television. Late in the 20th century this has significantly fallen. In many cases the only local programmes on a television station today will be the local newscast.

The above can also apply to radio. A national radio network may have local studios or affiliates who opt-out at various times to present local programs and content.

In the late-1950s, many of the early Australian television series such as Melbourne Magazine (1957), Sydney Tonight (1956–1959), and TV Talent Scout (1957–1958) were broadcast in only a single city.

== Canada ==
In Canada, historically local television stations produced a significant volume of local programming, including newscasts, locally or regionally oriented talk shows, and variety entertainment programs such as Tiny Talent Time or Homegrown Cafe; a few stations, such as CHCH-TV in Hamilton, Ontario and CJOH in Ottawa, also distributed some of their local programming more widely through television syndication, most notably CHCH's Hilarious House of Frightenstein and CJOH's You Can't Do That on Television, both of which were broadcast across both Canada and the United States.

With the cross-national consolidation of Canadian media ownership in the 1990s and 2000s, network-affiliated stations now rarely produce much more than their own local or regional newscasts, although some stations may continue to produce a small amount of additional local programming. Independent stations may produce more local programming, although such stations are now rare in the Canadian media landscape.

In radio, virtually all Canadian commercial radio stations are officially programmed locally, although many stations cut costs by contracting some dayparts out to voice-tracked hosts who are not actually located in the station's physical studio or even necessarily in the same city, using a home studio, and may even be performing their show from the United States. The CBC Radio One, CBC Radio 2, Ici Radio-Canada Première and Ici Musique networks consist primarily of networked national programming, although all include some degree of local programming in certain time blocks. Radio One and Première stations have a significant number of production centres which create and air their own local morning and/or afternoon talk shows, while Radio 2's and Ici Musique's local content is limited to local news and weather updates.

== United States ==
The term is also generally accepted to refer to television programming that is not produced by a broadcast or other media source for national or international distribution (broadcast syndication). Usually programming of local interest is produced by either a Public, educational, and government access (PEG) television organization, cable TV operator or broadcast network affiliate stations that offer local radio news and television news.

=== Placeholder use of term ===
Additionally, the term is used in a more generic form in the United States, Canada, Mexico and other countries in the Western Hemisphere as a placeholder term within published national program guide listings in publications such as the post-2006 format TV Guide or USA Today which only carry the default schedules of national networks, where the "local programming" designation replaces detailed listings for a local station that would be impossible to print in a national publication. Outside of local newscasts and some rare non-news programming however, the term merely describes time periods under a local station's control, where syndicated content airs rather than true local programming. For equivalent electronic program guide listings for set-top boxes, the term is used mainly with PEG stations and networks which do not have a schedule compiled by a cable operator as a default placeholder; other instances are with only broadcast stations who outright refuse or do not release their program listings due to lack of staff, though as advertisers usually demand a minimum schedule to place their ads on a television station (and most of these stations are associated with smaller national digital subchannel networks which do provide a default schedule for distribution), the vast majority of broadcast stations do provide program listings. Wikipedia itself also uses this designation in its series of American network television schedule articles for non-network programming time.

== United Kingdom ==
Many local television stations in the United Kingdom ceased broadcasting due to a lack of viability, but some stations are still being broadcast, including:

- Midlands Asian Television (MATV)
- NVTV (Northern Visions Television), Belfast
- That's TV

== See also ==
- Advertorial, a common form of local programming in North America where local businesses advertise their products and services
- List of local children's television series (United States)
- Local television in Greece
- Local origination (disambiguation)
- Network affiliate
- Regional television in Australia
- Regional variation
