= Variety View =

- Genre: Variety
- Presented by: Harry Sutcliffe; Robert Peach; Frank Rich
- Country of origin: Australia
- Original language: English

Production
- Running time: 30 minutes

Original release
- Network: ABV-2
- Release: 1958 – 1959

Variety View is an Australian television series which aired on Melbourne station ABV-2 from 1958 to 1959. The series was a half-hour live variety show. Some episodes were hosted by Harry Sutcliffe and Robert Peach.

On the episode aired on 1 August 1958, the host was Frank Rich, while the guests included instrumental group The Four Jelatis, juggler John Broadway, tenor Eric Michaelson, baritone William Laird, and singer Shirlene Clancy.

== Episode status ==
Archival status is unknown. The 16mm sound and image negatives of a June 1958 episode may possibly be held by National Archives of Australia
