= Just Barbara =

- Genre: Variety
- Starring: Barbara Virgil
- Country of origin: Australia
- Original language: English

Production
- Running time: 30 minutes

Original release
- Network: ABV-2
- Release: 13 March – 17 April 1961

Just Barbara is an Australian television series which aired in Melbourne on ABV-2 from 13 March until 17 April 1961.

Starring U.S. entertainer Barbara Virgil, it was a half-hour variety series. Regulars in the series included Joe Jenkins, Abe Jensen, and the ABC Melbourne Dance Band.
