= The World (TV program) =

Australian world news ABC TV program

- Genre: News, Current Affairs
- Presented by: Girish Sawlani
- Country of origin: Australia
- Original language: English
- No. of seasons: 15

Production
- Production locations: Melbourne, Victoria
- Running time: 60 minutes (1 hour)

Original release
- Network: ABC
- Release: 22 July 2010 – present

The World is an Australian news program which broadcasts on ABC News from 9 pm to 10 pm on weekdays.

The program is hosted by Girish Sawlani and airs live in all Australian time zones on the ABC News channel. It is also streamed live on the ABC's iview website and broadcast live on Foxtel pay television service and also broadcast on ABC Australia throughout the Asia-Pacific region.

== History ==
The program commenced broadcasting on 22 July 2010, the same evening on the launch of ABC News 24, with then host Scott Bevan presenting its first edition. The program originally aired from 9 pm to 10 pm and had a strong focus on overseas news.

The World was originally produced from the ABC Ultimo Centre in Sydney before moving to the ABC Southbank Centre in Melbourne in early 2014 and with this change it moved to a later time slot from 10.00 pm to 11.00 pm along with new hosts Jim Middleton and Zoe Daniel.

In September 2014, the ABC received budget cuts from the federal government, leaving Middleton to accept a redundancy package and Daniel moving back into ABC News reporting duties. The program survived the budget cuts with Beverley O'Connor taking over as the permanent host. While still focusing on overseas news, the format was slightly modified to incorporate more localised stories from around Australia.

In 2024 The World reverted to the 9 pm to 10 pm time slot.

O’Connor announced her departure from the ABC in August 2024, with Girish Sawlani taking over has host of the program.

=== Presenters ===
- Graham Creed – weather (2010–present)
- Yvonne Yong – host (2018–2024)
- Girish Sawlani – host (2024–present)

=== Past presenters ===
- Beverley O'Connor – host (2014–2024)
- Auskar Surbakti – business and occasional fill-in presenter (2014–2017)
- Jim Middleton – co-host (2014)
- Zoe Daniel – co-host (2014)
- Jane Hutcheon – host (2013–2014)
- Jeremy Fernandez – host (2013–2014)
- Scott Bevan – host (2010–2013)

== The World This Week ==
The World This Week is broadcast on ABC Australia each Saturday morning from 4:00 am to 4:30 am and the ABC News channel each Saturday morning from 4:30 am to 5:00 am and 11:30 am to 12:00 pm, as well as being repeated on the ABC main channel each Sunday morning from 10:30 am to 11:00 am hosted by Girish Sawlani. The show recaps the main overseas news and current affairs from the week and is also replayed on ABC News channel and ABC Australia throughout that day.
