= Peter Van de Veire =

Flemish radio personality

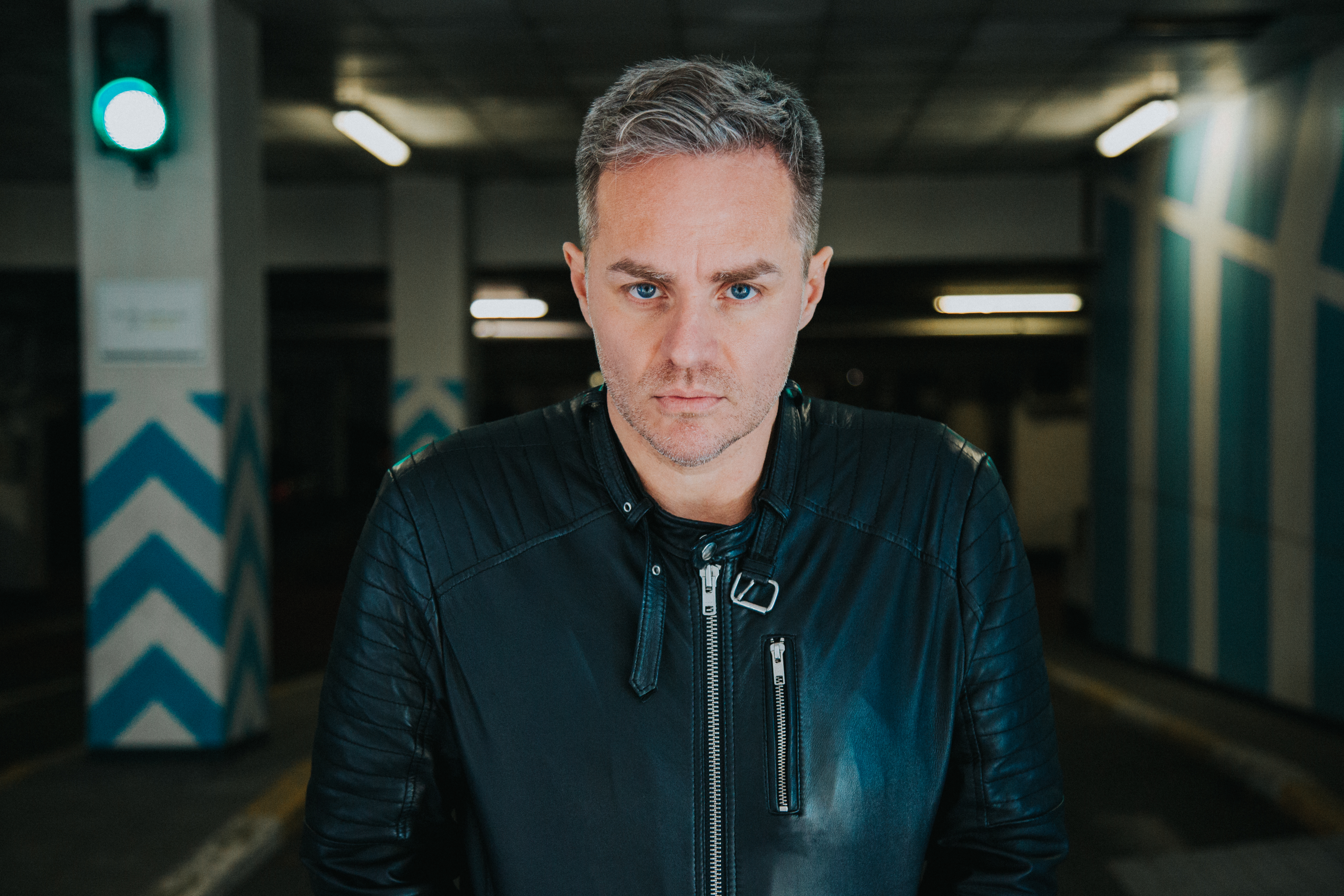
- Van de Veire in 2019
- Born: 1 December 1971 (age 54); Eeklo, Belgium
- Occupations: Radio and television presenter

Peter Van de Veire (born 1 December 1971) is a well-known radio personality in Flanders.

== Early life ==
Van de Veire grew up in the town of Waarschoot. After attaining a degree in communications management, he briefly sold vacuum cleaners door-to-door.

== Media career ==
In 1993, Van de Veire started working for a local television station before moving on to host Studio.KET on the children's channel Ketnet. In 1999, he became host of De Afrekening, a popular chart show on the youth-oriented channel Studio Brussel. After a brief period where he presented the lunchtime slot on that same channel he was offered his own morning show, De Grote Peter Van de Veire Ochtendshow, which he presented up until September 2008. He briefly returned to television to host De Provincieshow, followed by his own music-themed chat show, Peter Live, which began airing in October 2008 on één.

Outside of his radio career, Van de Veire performs live with Gerrit Kerremans in De Peter Van de Veire Love Show. Since 2014, Van de Veire has been VRT's commentator for the Eurovision Song Contest.

== Notable achievements ==
Van de Veire frequently promotes songs that would normally receive little play time due to their subject matter or low quality (dubbed "foute" or "wrong" music) . Both Lief Klein Konijntje by Henkie and Boten Anna by Basshunter were hyped by Van de Veire and ended up high in the Flemish charts as a result.

In 2006 and 2007, he was one of the presenters taking part in the Music For Life event, spending 6 days in a so-called "glass house" without food, broadcasting live to collect money for charity.

Van de Veire quipped that, if girl choir Scala managed to make it to the top of the Afrekening chart, he would parade across Brussels' Grote Markt naked except for feathers stuck in his behind; When Scala was voted into the chart by a wide margin, Van de Veire obliged.

On 18 June 2012, Van de Veire set a new world record in radio presenting. On the VRT's radio channel MNM, he was behind the microphone for more than 8 days almost non-stop, sleeping 8 hours in total only. Van de Veire's feat was aimed at supporting students during their exams.
