= Melbourne Magazine =

- Genre: Talk show
- Presented by: Corinne Kerby; Reg Neal
- Country of origin: Australia
- Original language: English

Original release
- Network: ABV-2
- Release: 16 January – 18 December 1957

Melbourne Magazine is an Australian television series that aired on Melbourne station ABV-2. The series debuted 16 January 1957 and ended on 18 December 1957. For most of its run, Melbourne Magazine was a fortnightly series.

A weekly series broadcast on Wednesdays, Melbourne Magazine aired live and featured Corinne Kerby as the host for the first few episodes, with the rest of the series hosted by Reg Neal. The series is described as featuring "interviews with prominent personalities".
