= Jim Middleton (journalist) =

Australian journalist

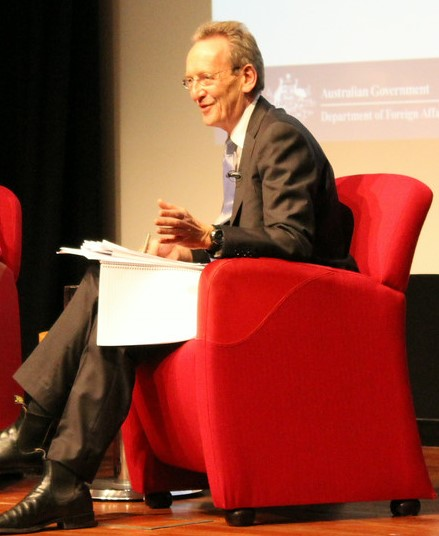
- Middleton hosting an event in July 2014.
- Born: Edinburgh, United Kingdom
- Education: University of Western Australia
- Occupation: Advisor
- Years active: 1970–present
- Employer: Senator Tim Storer
- Known for: Journalism, TV presenting
- Partner: Alice Ryan
- Children: Veronica Phillips, Miriam Phillips, Kitty Middleton, Nell Middleton, Maud Middleton
- Website: Jim Middleton profile

Jim Middleton is an Australian journalist and was a senior advisor to former South Australian Senator Tim Storer.

Middleton graduated from the University of Western Australia before joining the Australian Broadcasting Corporation (ABC) in 1970. Middleton was involved in the transformation of radio station 2JJ into the national Triple J brand, networked nationally around Australia. He served as the ABC's North America correspondent until 1988, when he became the ABC's chief political correspondent in Canberra. In 2008, Middleton left his political role in Canberra to join the Australia Network, presenting Newsline and The World.

Middleton took a voluntary redundancy from the ABC following the closure of the Australia Network due to funding cuts signing off on 2 September 2014.

Middleton joined Sky News Australia a month later, beginning on 22 September 2014, as a reporter and foreign correspondent. In July 2016, he became presenter of new program Weekend Agenda. Middleton departed Sky News in early 2018 to serve as a senior advisor to former Senator and family friend Tim Storer.

In 2022 Middleton became media advisor to the Climate 200 group.
