= Mass media in the Netherlands =

Mass media in the Netherlands – television, radio, newspapers, magazines – are characterised by a tradition of politico-denominational segregation ("pillarisation") on the one hand and an increasing degree of commercialism on the other.

== Television and radio ==
Television and radio are provided by a system of public-broadcasting organisations (sharing three television and five radio networks) together with a number of commercial channels.

=== Public service broadcasting ===
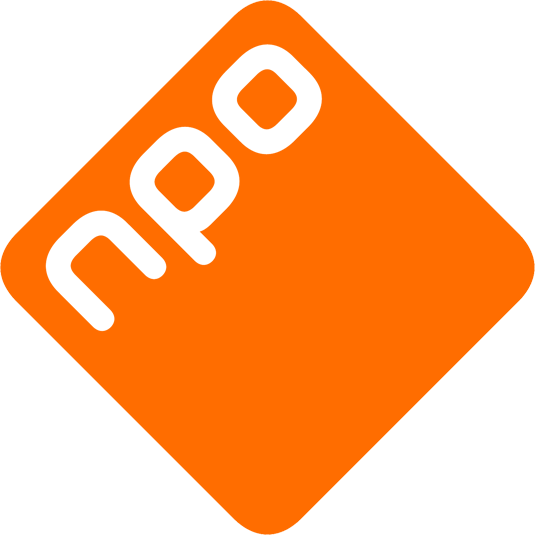
NPO Logo

The Netherlands Public Broadcasting system arose from the former practice – known as "pillarisation" – in which the country's various religious and social groups all organised their own institutions, with financial help from the government. These institutions included broadcasting. Although the system of pillarisation largely collapsed in the 1970s, the broadcasting associations themselves have remained active. Most have several tens of thousands of members, and they are allocated broadcasting time on the public channels in proportion to the size of their memberships. In addition, a number of other broadcasting foundations, established by the government, also receive air time.

The system is financed from three sources:

- grant-in-aid payments from the government, raised from general taxation;
- the income from on-air advertising, regulated by the Stichting Ether Reclame (STER), a public body;
- (a small proportion of the total) the dues paid by members of the broadcasting associations.

The broadcasting associations share three national television channels (NPO 1, NPO 2, NPO 3) and seven radio channels (NPO Radio 1, NPO Radio 2, NPO 3FM, NPO Radio 4, NPO Radio 5, NPO Radio 6, and FunX). Each of these television channels have their own profile: thus NPO 1 is oriented towards news, sport, and family programming, NPO 2 towards culture, arts, politics, and religion, while NPO 3 concentrates on youth and progressive programming.

There are also several provincial television channels, which are organised by the provinces.

Full name	Abbreviation	Status	Orientation	Website
Algemene Vereniging Radio Omroep	AVRO	Association (class A)	Liberal / neutral	avro.nl
Bart's Neverending Network	BNN	Association (class A)	Youth	bnn.nl
Evangelische Omroep	EO	Association (class A)	Orthodox Protestant	eo.nl
Katholieke Radio Omroep	KRO	Association (class A)	catholic	kro.nl
Omroepvereniging MAX	MAX	Association (class B)	Older viewers	omroepmax.nl
Ongehoord Nederland	ON	Association (class B)	Far-right	https://ongehoordnederland.tv/
Nederlandse Christelijke Radio Vereniging	NCRV	Association (class A)	Protestant	ncrv.nl
Publieke Omroep Weldenkend Nederland En Dergelijke	PowNed	Association (class C)	Rebellious / Right wing	powned.tv
Televisie Radio Omroep Stichting	TROS	Association (class A)	Neutral (former commercial pirate)	tros.nl
Omroepvereniging VARA	VARA	Association (class A)	Social-democratic	omroep.vara.nl
Vrijzinnig Protestantse Radio Omroep	VPRO	Association (class B)	Liberal (formerly Liberal Protestant)	vpro.nl
Wakker Nederland	WNL	Association (class C)	Conservative / right wing	omroepwnl.nl
Nederlandse Omroep Stichting	NOS	Foundation	News / sport	nos.nl
Stichting NTR	NTR	Foundation	Educational	ntr.nl
Boeddhistische Omroep Stichting	BOS	foundation	Buddhist	buddhistmedia.com
Humanistische Omroep	HO	foundation	Humanist	humanistischeomroep.nl
Interkerkelijke Omroep Nederland	IKON	foundation	Nine small Christian churches	omroep.nl/ikon
Joodse Omroep	JO	foundation	Jewish	joodseomroep.nl
Nederlandse Islamitische Omroep	NIO	foundation	Islamic (conservative)	nioweb.nl
Nederlandse Moslim Omroep	NMO	foundation	Islamic (progressive)	nmo.nl
Omrop Fryslân	OF	foundation	West Frisian language	omropfryslan.nl
Organisatie Hindoe Media	OHM	foundation	Hindu	ohmnet
Zendtijd voor Politieke Partijen	PP	foundation	Political parties represented in the Dutch parliament	
Rooms-Katholiek Kerkgenootschap	RKK	foundation	Catholic (conservative)	rkk.nl
Stichting Ether Reclame	STER	foundation	Commercial advertising	
Zendtijd voor Kerken	ZvK	foundation	Church services	zvk.nl

=== Commercial broadcasting ===
Commercial broadcasting was banned until the late 1980s. In the 1970s, before they were allowed to join the public television system, Veronica and TROS had broadcast as off-shore pirate stations. In the 1980s the RTL Group started broadcasting from Luxembourg. In 1988 commercial broadcasting was legalised. Currently there are seven majro commercial broadcast channels owned by two companies: RTL Nederland owns RTL 4, RTL 5, RTL 7 and RTL 8, while Talpa TV owns SBS6, SBS9, Net5 and Veronica. There are also other commercial broadcast networks offering speciality channels owned by companies such asParamount, Warner Bros. Discovery and The Walt Disney Company.

== Newspapers ==
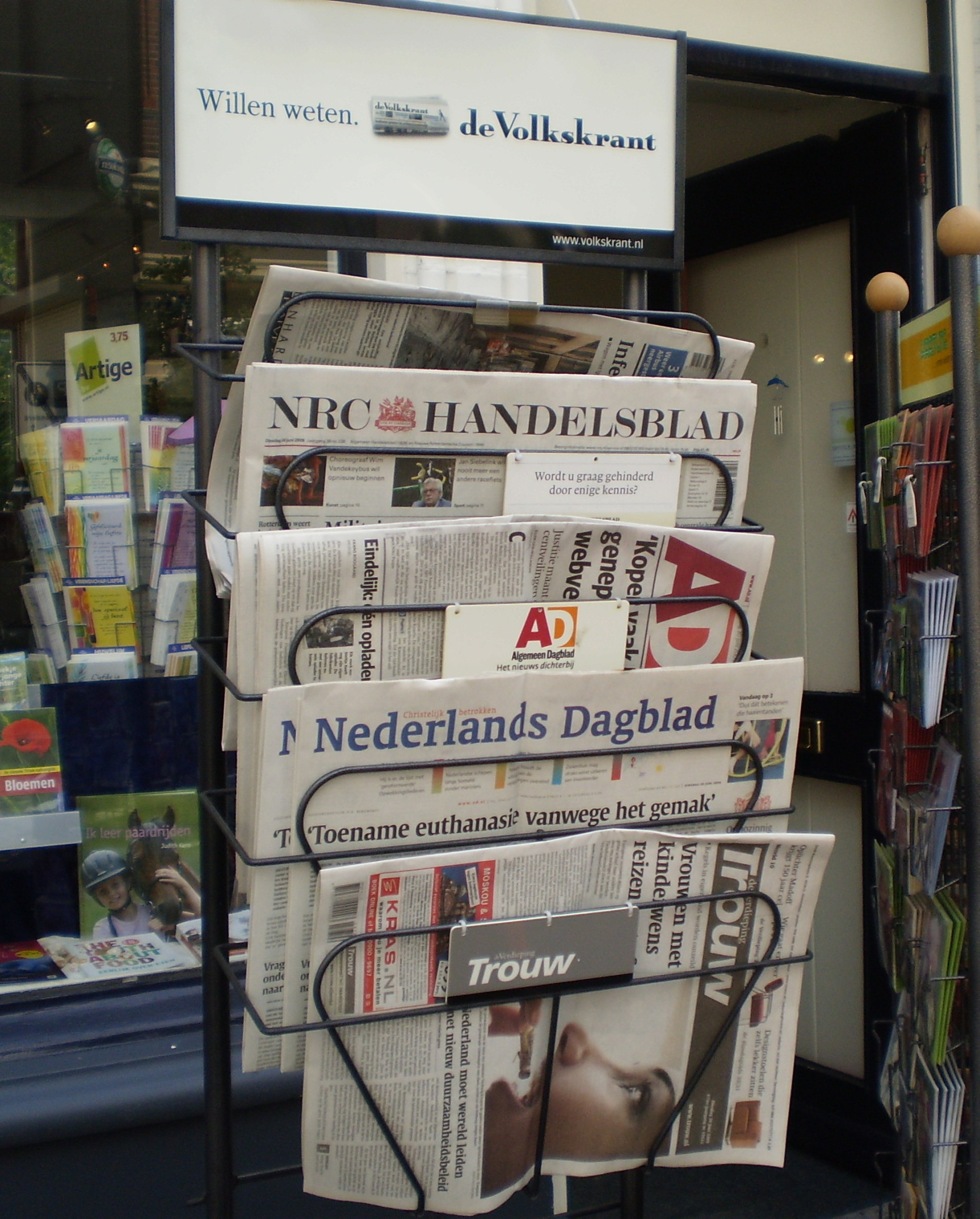
Newspaper rack in Nijmegen

All newspapers are privately owned. They were historically linked to the pillarisation system, with some titles having strong links to labour unions or political parties. These ties have all been severed now. Two companies play a large role: Medialaan - De Persgroep Publishing, which owns several newspapers; and Telegraaf Media Groep, which owns De Telegraaf (the largest paper) and Sp!ts, a free newspaper.

The most important papers are the right-wing tabloid De Telegraaf, the progressive liberal NRC Handelsblad, which also publishes nrc•next, the Protestant Trouw and the progressive left-wing De Volkskrant. The latter two newspaper won in consecutive years (2012, 2013) the prestigious award for being the best nationwide newspaper in Europe at the European Newspaper Award.

Smaller Protestant communities have their own paper, like the Nederlands Dagblad and the Reformatorisch Dagblad. The business community has the Het Financieele Dagblad. A recent phenomenon are the widely read free newspapers Spits and the Metro. There are also several local and regional newspapers. The Algemeen Dagblad, the third largest paper, recently merged with several local papers to form a hybrid national-local paper.

== Websites ==
Most broadcasting and newspapers organizations have online presence. Some organizations publish exclusively online, such as NU.nl, Tweakers, Dumpert and GeenStijl.

== Magazines ==
Magazines were, like the other media, frequently connected to pillars, such as Beatrijs, a Catholic woman's weekly. The main news magazines are the left-wing Vrij Nederland and De Groene Amsterdammer and the more right-wing Elsevier and HP/De Tijd.

Some 1970 Dutch magazines formerly owned by Verenigde Nederlandse Uitgeverijen were sold to by the Finnish media group Sanoma. Apart from many typical Dutch ones like Margriet, Libelle and Nieuwe Revu, these include Donald Duck (a comic book with Disney comics) and the Dutch edition of Playboy.

== See also ==
- Open access in the Netherlands

== Bibliography ==
- Euromedia Research Group; Mary Kelly; et al., eds. (2004). "Netherlands". Media in Europe (3rd ed.). SAGE Publications. ISBN 978-0-7619-4132-3.
- Jeroen Salman (2014). Pedlars and the Popular Press: Itinerant Distribution Networks in England and the Netherlands 1600-1850. Brill. ISBN 9789004252844.
