= NPO Soul & Jazz =

Defunct dutch digital radio station

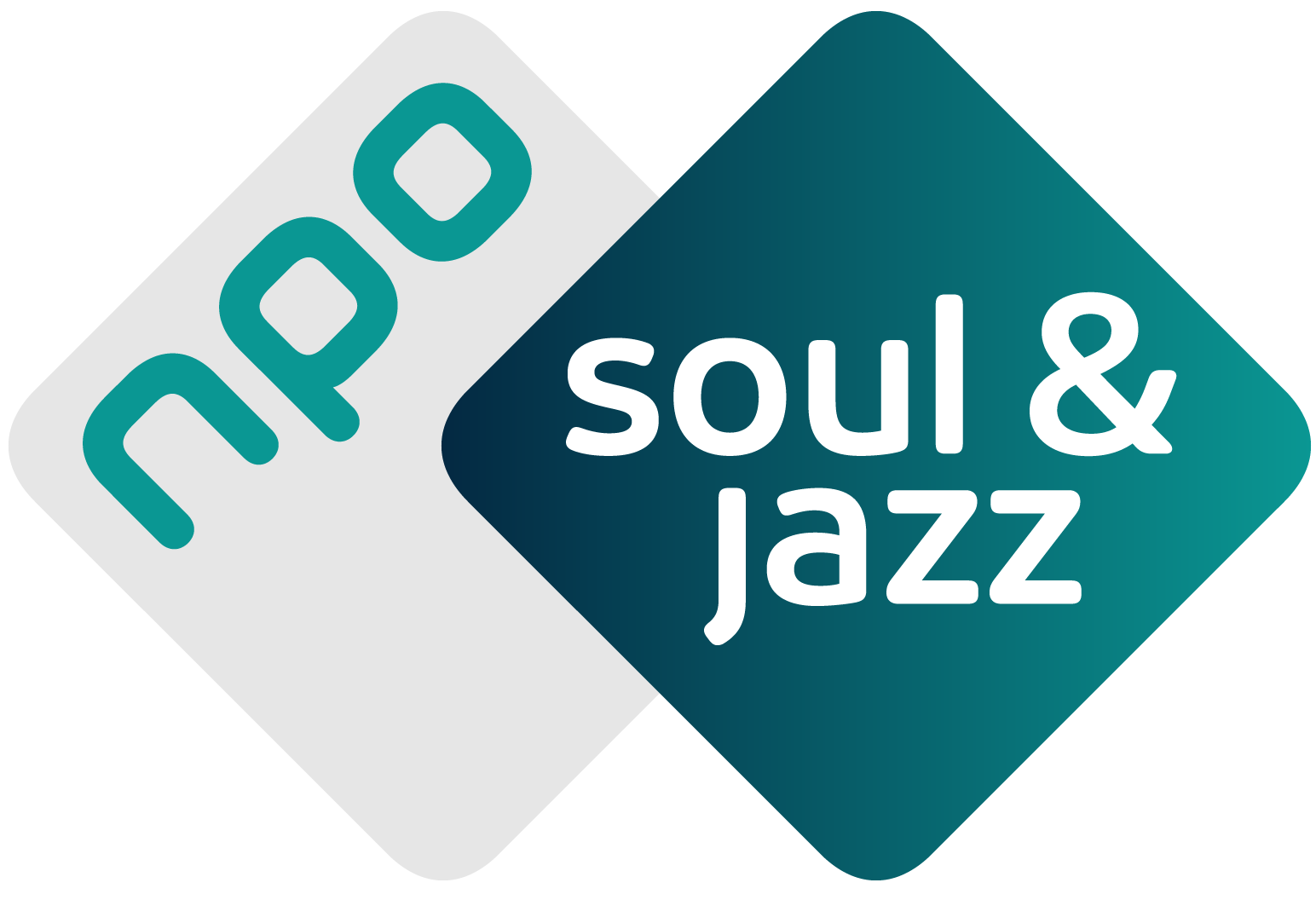
- last logo from 2023 until/to 2026.
- Netherlands
- Frequencies: Cable, DAB, DVB-T

Programming
- Format: Jazz music, Soul music

Ownership
- Owner: Nederlandse Publieke Omroep
- Sister stations: NPO Radio 1 NPO Radio 2 NPO 3FM; NPO Klassiek; NPO Radio 5 NPO FunX; NPO Sterren NL; NPO Blend; NPO Campus Radio

History
- First air date: 4 September 2006 (as Radio 6)
- Last air date: 1 September 2026
- Former names: Radio 6 (2006–2014); NPO Radio 6 (2014–2015); NPO Radio 2 Soul & Jazz (2017-2023)

NPO Soul & Jazz was a digital radio station from Netherlands Public Broadcasting (NPO).

== History ==
It launched as Radio 6 on 4 September 2006, when it took over from the Concertzender (now operating independently), its musical format is mainly soul and jazz, together with such related genres as funk, rhythm and blues, and world music. At night it also broadcasts a number of cultural and informative programmes produced by the following broadcasting associations: KRO-NCRV, MAX, NTR and VPRO. NPO Soul & Jazz is distributed via DAB, cable, and also online.

On 1 January 2016 NPO closed down NPO Radio 6, replacing it with NPO Soul & Jazz. NPO Soul & Jazz broadcast non stop music till 19 hrs. Between 19 and 23 hrs there are presented programmes on NPO Soul & Jazz.

The station closed on 1 September 2026 as part of cost-cutting measures. Its shutdown will be compensated by the increase of jazz-related programmes on other stations. Soul music will be heard more on NPO BLEND, while NTR, MAX and VPRO will launch jazz-related podcasts.

== Logos ==
NPO Radio 6 logo used until from 2014 to 2016

NPO Soul & Jazz first era logo used until from 2016 to 2017

NPO Radio 2 Soul & Jazz logo used until from 2017 to 2023

== See also ==
- List of radio stations in the Netherlands
