= Ster =

Organisation responsible for advertising on NPO

Stichting Ether Reclame
- Logo since 8 November 2001, using the Franklin Gothic typeface
- Type: Public broadcaster dedicated to radio and television advertisements
- Country: Netherlands
- Availability: Netherlands
- Founded: 1965; 61 years ago
- TV stations: NPO 1; NPO 2; NPO 3
- Radio stations: NPO Radio 1; NPO Radio 2; NPO 3FM; NPO Klassiek; NPO Radio 5; NPO FunX
- Official website: ster.nl

Stichting Ether Reclame (Ster) (English: Foundation Ether Advertisement) is the organization for radio, television and online advertisements on the NPO, the public broadcaster of the Netherlands. With the income from these, parts of the costs of public broadcasting are paid for.

It was founded in 1965 as the Stichting tot Uitzenden van Reclame ("Foundation for the Broadcasting of Advertisements"); the name was changed to the present name that same year. STER is most famous for Loeki de Leeuw, an animated puppet which appeared at the beginning and ending of all of STER's commercials from 1972 until 2004, and again in 2019 and from 2021 onwards.

== Content and timing ==
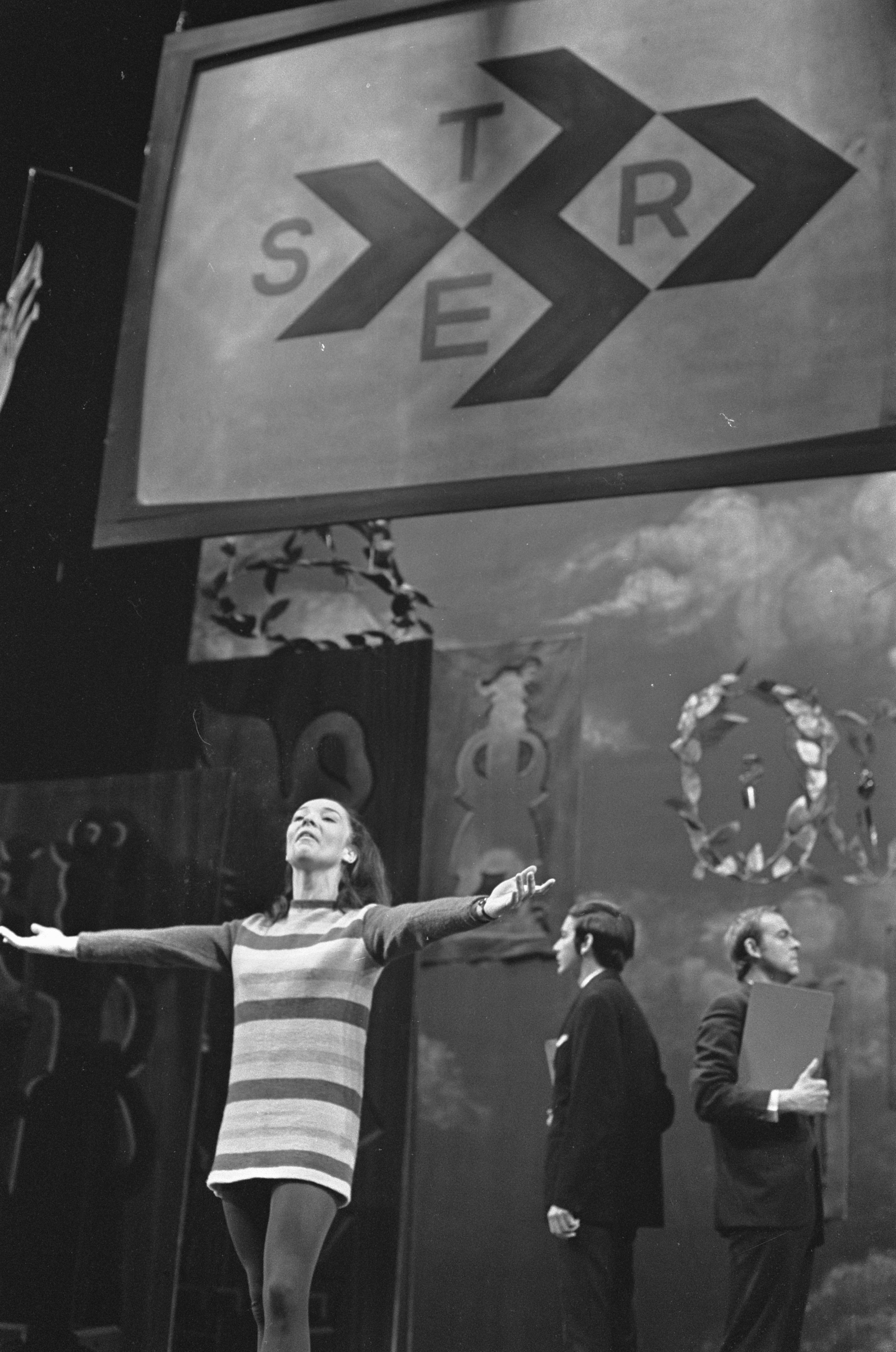
STER's previous logo used from 25 August 1965 to 7 November 2001, as seen in a 1968 STER event

STER may not use more than 10% of the airtime per year on advertisement and daily not more than 15% and also not air ads within programs (as happens on the Dutch commercial stations). For programming with long runtimes, like UEFA Champions League events, they consider the pregame (produced by NOS), each half of the game (first half produced by AVRO, second half produced by KRO), halftime (produced by NCRV), and the postgame (produced by VARA) as separate standalone programs in their programming guide and air ads between them.

STER is responsible for the contents of the ads which have to be strictly separate from the programs on the public networks and not influence the programming. Complaints about ads can be made at the Reclame Code Commissie (in English: "Advertising Code Committee", comparable to the Advertising Standards Authority in the UK). STER contributes about 200 million euro to the total budget of 900 million euro (2013) of the Dutch Public Broadcaster.

== History ==
Logo until 2001

In order to accommodate its schedule to Ster's commercial breaks, Nederland 1 had its opening time advanced by fifteen minutes (from 7pm to 6:45pm) because the insertion of two commercial breaks between 7 and 8pm would make the airing of a 50-minute series in the timeslot inefficient. The new structure meant that the five-minute children's programme would air at 6:45pm, followed by the news bulletin at 6:50pm (expanding in length from one minute to five) and then the commercial break at 6:55pm. Ster would start with three allocations on the channel: 6:55-7pm, 7:56-8pm and 8:15-8:20pm. Advertising on Saturday afternoons was limited because it was considered undesirable to open the schedule with a commercial break, let alone associate it with the youth. The solution was moving the weekly newsmagazine, which also had subtitles for the deaf, from Tuesday nights to Saturday afternoons. For this, a solution was drafted: a one-minute NTS news summary would air at 3:30pm, then the first break would be from 3:31 to 3:34pm, then the newsmagazine, and then a second break from 3:57 and 4pm. Nederland 2 also had its allocations, three-minute commercial breaks before the first and second news bulletin of the evening. The government agreed that there would be no commercial breaks on Sundays and public holidays.

The first commercial break broadcast on Dutch television (excluding TV Noordzee) was on 2 January 1967 at 7pm. The first commercial was for CEBUCO, the newspaper advertising association, who was concerned about the arrival of television advertising being a death sentence to advertising on newspapers, beginning with the phrase "Seven seconds ago, the first advertisement started on television. You heard of it from your newspaper". The slogan used by the association, de Krant kunt u niet missen geen dag ("You never miss a day without your newspaper") called for the survival of the industry. Other commercials on the first break included Syntraciet coal ovoids, Kwatta chocolates, Jumbo board games and Zenith watches. On 1 March 1968, Ster started radio broadcasts with slots on Hilversum 1, 2 and 3. The company's logo was designed in 1966 by Karel van Hes and followed a style similar to M. C. Escher with four blocks. It is estimated that this arrangement of the logo appeared a million times from 1967 to 2001, when the current logo was adopted. Between commercials, in its first five years on air, an optical consisting of a wave effect was shown.

Ster started using Loeki de Leeuw shorts for its commercial breaks in 1972.

In May 1990, the government announced the passing of a law to enable television commercials - and consequently - Ster's activities, to be allowed on Sundays. The law was approved in April 1991. Ster's advertising growth in 1993 projected a 50% slide due to the impact of a commercial recession, witnessing no growth in the first half of the year.

On 8 November 2001, STER introduced a new logo. The existing four-blocked diamond-cube logo was confined to history after 36 years of legal competition, and was replaced by a blue-lined diamond that contains the "Ster" wordmark which uses the Franklin Gothic typeface, which cements its status as a "dynamic organisation" rather than a "bureaucratic company". Loeki continued during breaks due to his popularity. The new logo debuted on STER's website on 2 January 2002. Since 2003, the opening and closing bumpers have been aligned with the graphics of the three channels.

In 2018, Ster planned the increase of its revenue on YouTube, at then evaluated at €5 million, to €40 million, in order to compensate the losses in online advertising on NPO's websites.
