= Classicnl =

- Netherlands
- Frequencies: Cable, DAB+ and Internet

Programming
- Format: Classical music

Ownership
- Owner: Bakker Oosterbeek Beheer BV

History
- First air date: 1994
- Former call signs: Classic FM (1994–2019)

Links
- Webcast: Web Stream; Playlist
- Website: Classic.nl

Classicnl (formerly known as Classic FM) is a classical music radio station in the Netherlands, which at one time broadcast on FM, but is now available nationally on DAB+, cable and internationally on the Internet. The station is owned by the Bakker Oosterbeek Beheer BV which acquired the station from Telegraaf Media Groep which owned the radio station from 2006 until November 2017. The radio station was known as Classic FM from 1994 until October 1st, 2019. Between 1994 and 1997, the format was almost identical to the Classic FM (UK) station, including the jingles, but it featured Dutch presentation. It currently transmits classical music 24 hours a day with no presenters.

== History ==
At the end of January 1994, there was a reallocation of FM terrestrial frequencies. As part of this process, there was exactly one frequency package planned for jazz and classical music. The preference of the ministry of welfare, public health and culture (Ministerie van Welzijn, Volksgezondheid en Cultuur) was to allocate this package to EuroJazz (later called Jazz Radio), but this station was not able to pay for the package. As Classic FM from the UK also bid on the frequency package, after negotiations with the ministry, the package was sold to this station on the condition that 40% of broadcast time would be jazz. As a result, on April 30, 1994, the Dutch station Classic FM was founded and broadcasts commenced.

In 1997, following a complaint from Sky Radio and Radio 538, the court lifted the broadcast obligation for jazz music on this frequency. Shortly after this verdict, Sky Radio bought the station and since then only light classical music can be heard on Classic FM, which resulted in a significant rise in listening numbers. On April 1, 2000, the ailing competitor Concertradio was incorporated into Classic FM, making Classic FM the only classical, private radio station in the Netherlands.

During the next frequency redistribution in 2003, Classic FM did not obtain the frequency package for classical music, because the parent company Sky Radio Group already owned the maximum of two radio stations (Sky Radio and Radio Veronica). The slot for classical music was left unassigned, to be picked up later that year by Arrow 90.7 FM (later known as SubLime FM). As a consequence, Classicnl could only be received through cable, satellite, DAB+, and internet.

Nevertheless, in 2009, Classic FM celebrated a fifteenth anniversary special broadcasts, a CD release and a sold-out concert in the Concertgebouw, Amsterdam. In 2013, there were significant changes that led to an increased importance of the spoken word, following a collaboration with De Telegraaf, which edited morning shows and provided special features in the evenings. These features included travel programs, discussions of movies with Bart van Leeuwen, which later developed into a daily show with Michael Pilarczyk.

In November 2017, investor Ids Bakker of Bakker Oosterbeek Beheer acquired the station from Telegraaf Media Group and decided to discontinue broadcasting on the DAB+ frequency, because it was barely used. Bakker Oosterbeek Beheer also owns labels for classical and jazz music under the name Challenge Records and operates classical streaming services under the name MeloMe.

Between July and August 2018, Classic FM had a radio market share of 1.3% (the state financed classical music radio station Radio 4 had 2.1%).

In October 2019, Bakker Oosterbeek Beheer decided to terminate the 1994 license agreement with the owners of Classic FM (UK) - British Global Media & Entertainment - and to rename the station to Classicnl, because it had not used an FM frequency since 2003. Both agreed that the Classic FM brand cannot be used in the Netherlands in the coming years.

The station was commissioned to attract a younger audience by playing shorter pieces of classical music during the day and complete classical works at night. In addition to cable TV and Internet, the station returned to DAB+.

== See also ==
- List of radio stations in the Netherlands
