= Bart Arens =

Dutch radio DJ

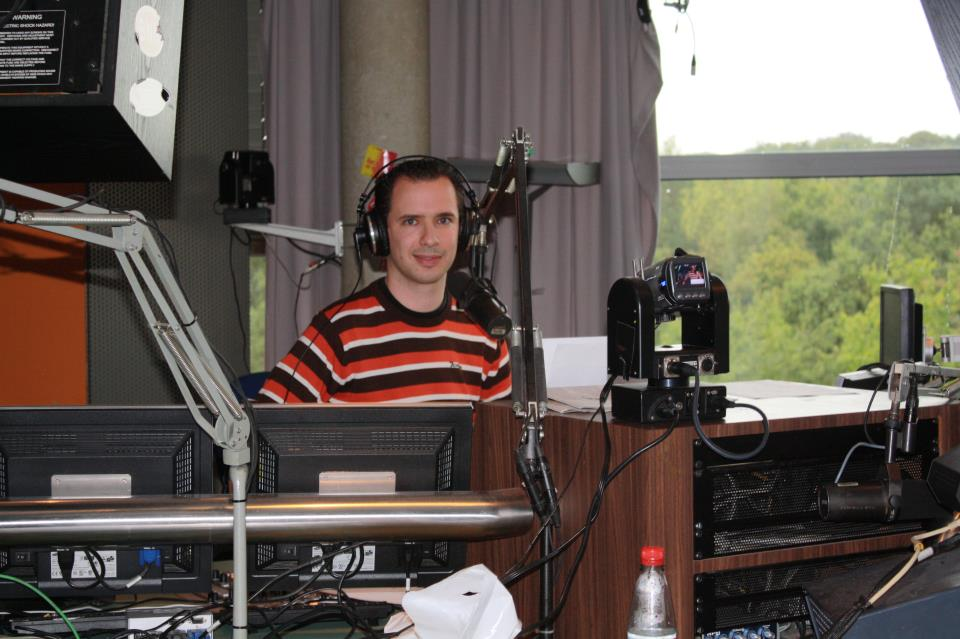
- Born: Bart Arens; 2 March 1978 (age 48); Lisse, Netherlands
- Presenting career
- Show: Mega Top 50
- Station: 3FM NPO Radio 2
- Network: TROS
- Time slot: 15:00 - 18:00 p.m. Saturday
- Show: De radioshow van Bart
- Station: 3FM
- Network: TROS
- Time slot: 15:00 - 18:00 p.m. Sunday
- Style: Disc Jockey
- Country: Netherlands
- Website: http://www.bartarens.com/

Bart Arens (born 2 March 1978) is a Dutch radio DJ. He currently presents 3 radio programs on 3FM: 3FM Weekend Request, Mega Top 50 and De radioshow van Bart.
