= List of radio stations in the Netherlands =

This is a list of radio stations in the Netherlands.

== National ==
=== Public ===
Public radio in the Netherlands is provided jointly by a number of broadcasting organizations operating within the framework of the Netherlands Public Broadcasting (NPO). News bulletins on all stations are provided by NOS.

All of the stations below are also available on digital satellite, digital terrestrial and cable television.

==== National FM and DAB ====
- NPO Radio 1: News, politics, current affairs and sport
- NPO Radio 2: Popular music, mostly from the 1970s, 1980s, 1990s and Dutch music for 35-55 year olds
- NPO 3FM: Pop and rock music for 15-35 year-olds
- NPO Klassiek: Classical music

==== National DAB ====
- NPO Radio 5: Music from the 1950s to 1980s for 55 year-olds and older.
- NPO Fun X: Urban and world music. Available on FM in Amsterdam, Rotterdam, The Hague and Utrecht, with some local programming variations.
- NPO Blend: R&B, neo-soul and classic hip-hop music.
- NPO Sterren NL: Music by Dutch artists.
- NPO Campus: Station for new radio talent.

==== Cable only ====
- Tweede kamerlijn: Live relays from the Dutch House of Representatives

=== Commercial ===
==== National FM and DAB ====
Most of the stations below are also available on digital satellite, digital terrestrial and cable television.

- Kavel A1: Sky Radio: Pop music on 101.0 - 101.9 FM
- Kavel A2: Radio 10: Music from the 1960s to today on 102.9 - 103.5 FM
- Kavel A3: Qmusic: Feel good pop music on 100.4 and 100.7 FM
- Kavel A4: BNR Nieuwsradio: News and business news with main frequencies 91.3, 95.4 and 100.0 FM
- Kavel A5: Radio Veronica: Pop and rock from the 1980s, 1990s and 2000s with main frequencies 88.4, 91.1 and 99.6 FM
- Kavel A6: Radio 538: Current hits, rock and dance music station on 102.1 - 102.7 FM
- Kavel A7: Joe: Music from the 1970s to the 1990s with main frequencies 87.6, 87.7, 103.8 and 104.1 FM
- Kavel A8: Yoursafe Radio: Talk and music programs aimed at young people
- Kavel A9: 100% NL: Music by Dutch bands and artists with main frequencies 90.2, 92.1, 99.1, 104.4 and 104.6 FM

==== National DAB ====
- 4ever49 Radio: Feel good music
- Arrow Classic Rock: Classic rock
- BBC World Service: English service of international news
- BG Radio: Bulgarian music
- Classicnl: Classical music
- Danceradio: (Amsterdam) DAB+ channel: 5A,6A,10C
- GPR Sportradio: Music and Sports updates
- Groot Nieuws Radio: Religious programming
- KINK: Alternative music
- KINK 80's: Alternative music from the 1980s
- Qmusic non-stop: Non-stop feel good pop music
- Radio 10 60s & 70s Hits: Music from the 1960s and 1970s
- 538 NON STOP: Non-stop current hits
- Sky Radio Hits: Non-stop hit music
- SLAM!: Pop and dance music
- Sublime: Jazz, funk, soul, lounge and disco music
- Vibe Radio: Urban music. Available on FM in Amsterdam, Arnhem.
- GLXY.RADIO: Urban music. Available on FM in Amsterdam, Almere, Alkmaar, Haarlem.

==== Cable only stations ====
A number of additional stations are carried on the Netherlands' leading cable television suppliers:

- NETHERLANDS: Arrow Classic Rock, Concertzender, Effeling Kids Radio plus all regional public radio stations.
- BELGIUM (VRT): VRT Radio 1, VRT Radio 2, Studio Brussel, Klara, NMN.
- GREAT BRITAIN (BBC): BBC Radio 1, BBC Radio 2, BBC Radio 3, BBC Radio 4.
- GERMANY: Deutsche Welle.

Other local Dutch commercial stations and public stations from across Europe are available along with a selection of themed music channels.

== Regional ==
=== Regional Commercial Networks ===
Regional and local commercial networks

- Kavel B01 and B06: Kink

Alkmaar FM 98.3, Amsterdam 98.0, Den Haag 98.0, Rotterdam 97.6 and Utrecht 97.3.

- Kavel B02: GLXY.RADIO

Alkmaar FM 96.3, Almere 97.4, Amsterdam 93.6 and Haarlem 97.3.

- Kavel B03, B08, B09, B12, B13, B16, B17, B18, B19, B20, B22, B24, B31, B34 and B38: RADIONL

Alkmaar FM 104.2, Amsterdam 94.9, Apeldoorn 88.7 and 94.0, Arnhem 89.6, Assen 97.1, Bathmen 93.1, Breda 104.3, Cuijk 95.3, Den Bosch 94.1, Den Haag 99.4, Den Helder 94.5, Dokkum 96.3, Drachten 96.0, Duiven 95.5, Ede 96.0, Eindhoven 90.3, Elst 88.5, Emmen 89.9, Enschede 93.3, Groningen 104.4, Hardenberg 93.4, Helmond 90.5, Hengelo 98.0, Hoogersmilde 104.2, Hoogeveen 97.0, Leeuwarden 96.6, Leiden 93.7, Lelystad 89.4, Loon op Zand 93.3, Markelo 93.5, Meppel 95.7, Nijmegen 94.2, Ommen 93.1, Oosterwolde 96.9, Oss 90.1, Oude Polder 92.4, Roosendaal 97.3, Rotterdam 99.6, Sneek 94.3, Stadskanaal 96.7, Tjerkgaast 94.1, Utrecht 98.5, Vlissingen 89.3, Winschoten 96.9, Zieuwent/Ruurlo 101.9, and Zwolle 89.2 and 97.2.

- Kavel B04: 247Spice

Amsterdam FM 90.1.

- Kavel B04: Ujala Radio

Amsterdam FM 93.3.

- Kavel B05: SLAM!

Alkmaar FM 95.4, Almere 95.9, Alphen 95.9, Amsterdam 95.7, Den Haag 95.6, Gouda 95.9, Hilversum 95.9, Naaldwijk 96.0, Utrecht 103.4 and Zoetermeer 95.7.

- Kavel B07: Amor FM

Den Haag FM 89.8 and Rotterdam 102.3.

- Kavel B10: Waterstad FM

Drachten FM 93.5, Emmeloord 101.8, Heerenveen 92.8 and Irnsum 93.2.

- Kavel B10 and B35: Frysk FM

Heerenveen FM 97.3 and Leeuwarden 101.8

- Kavel B11, B26, B28, B30, B32, B33 and B36: Radio Continu

Amersfoort FM 99.5, Deventer 89.9, Emmen 92.3, Eext 92.6, Hoogersmilde 104.7, Hoogezand 92.4, Irnsum 98.2, Ommen 92.4, Sneek 97.9, Terschelling 97.7, Wieringermeer 96.0, Winterswijk 94.3, Zieuwent 95.7 and Zuidwolde 92.7.

- Kavel B14 and B37: Simone FM

Appingedam FM 103.6, Emmen 101.7, Groningen 92.9, Hoogezand 91.3, Stadskanaal 91.3 and Winschoten 93.0.

- Kavel B15: Grunn FM

Groningen FM 89.1.

- Kavel B16 and B18: Joy Radio

Enschede FM 87.6, Groningen 98.5, Hoogeveen 98.9, Smilde 98.7 and Tjerkgaast 98.5.

- Kavel B21: Radio 10 Brabant

Breda FM 89.2, Den Bosch 88.9 and 97.4, Eindhoven 89.3, Helmond 95.5, Roosendaal 93.9, Tilburg 103.6, Waalwijk 88.8 and Weert 95.2.

- Kavel B22: Radio Noordzee

Amersfoort FM 99.5, Apeldoorn 94.0, Breda 104.3, Cuijk 95.3, Ede 96.0, Eindhoven 96.0, Etten-Leur 90.3, Helmond 94.5, Loon op Zand 90.5, Nijmegen 93.3, Oss 94.2, Roermond 90.1, Roosendaal 92.8, Vught 97.3 and Weert 95.2.

- Kavel B23: Radio JND

Eindhoven FM 93.2 and 93.6.

- Kavel B25: Qmusic Limburg

Eys FM 98.1, Landgraaf 97.7, Maastricht 97.6, Roermond 96.1, Weert 98.5.

- Kavel B29: Tukker FM

Oldenzaal FM 90.0.

- Kavel B34: Team FM

Stadskanaal FM 96.0.

- Kavel C12: Vahon Hindustani Radio

The Hague MW 1566.

=== Drenthe ===
Regional public

- Radio Drenthe: (FM 90.8, 99.3)

Local public

- DNO Radio: (FM 104.8 Zuidwolde)
- Omroep Assen FM: (FM 107.8 Assen)
- Radio AA en Hunze: (FM 105.6 Aa and Hunze)
- Radio Hoogeveen: (FM 106.8 Hoogeveen)
- RTV Borger-Odoorn: (FM 107.5 Borger)
- RTV Meppel: (FM 93.0 Meppel)
- RTV Zulthe: (FM 105.3 Marum)
- Tynaarlo Lokaal: (FM 105.9 Paterswolde, 107.4 Zuidlaren)
- ZO!34: (FM 107.6 Emmen, 105.4 Coevorden, 106.3 Zweloo)

=== Flevoland ===
Regional public

- Radio Flevoland: (FM 89.8)

Local public

- Easy 95.5 FM: (FM 95.5 Almere)
- LOZ Radio: (FM 106.4 Zeewolde)
- Radio Lelystad: (FM 90.3 Lelystad)
- RTV 527: (FM 105.2 Emmeloord)
- Urk FM: (FM 107.0 Urk)

=== Friesland ===
Regional public

- Omrop Fryslân: (FM 92.2, 92.5)

Local public

- Omroep LEO Middelse: (FM 105.3 Steins, 106.1 Leeuwarden)
- Omroep Odrie: (FM 106.9 Appelscha)
- Omroep RSH: (FM 106.2 Harlingen)
- Radio Centraal (Weststellingwerf): (FM 105.0 Wolvega, 107.4 Noordwolde)
- Radio Eenhorn: (FM 107.5 Waadhoeke)
- RTV IJsselmond: (FM 106.4)
- RTV Kanaal 30: (FM 105.0 Burgum)
- RTV NOF: (FM 105.8 Oudwoude, 107.0 Dokkum)
- Radio Spannenburg: (FM 96.4 Balk)
- Smelne FM: (FM 106.5 Drachten)
- WEEFF Radio: (FM 103.9 West Friesland)

=== Gelderland ===
Regional public

- Radio Gelderland: (FM 88.9 Arnhem/Nijmegen, 90.4 Achterhoek, 99.6 Betuwe, 103.5 Veluwe)

Local public

- A1 Radio: (FM 93.5 Barneveld, 106.8 Nijkerk)
- AFM: (FM 107.2 Aalten)
- B-FM: (FM 106.1 Zutphen)
- Ede FM: (FM 107.3 Ede)
- Extra FM: (FM 107.2 West Maas en Waal)
- Favoriet FM: (FM 94.0 Zevenaar, Doesburg, Westervoort and Duiven, 104.9 Groot Doesburg)
- Gelre FM: (FM 105.3, 105.7, 106.1, 106.4, 107.1, 107.5 East Gelre and Berkelland)
- Leuk FM: (FM 106.0 Berkelland, 106.9 East Gelre)
- LOE FM: (FM 105.5 Elburg)
- Loco FM: (FM 107.2 Oldebroek, 107.6 Wezep/Hattemerbroek)
- Omroep Berg en Dal: (FM 90.6, 107.1 Berg en Dal)
- Optimaal FM: (FM 94.7 Vethuizen, 105.5 Varsseveld, 105.6 MHz Didam, 106.2 Doetinchem)
- Radio Hattern: (FM 106.1 Hattern)
- Radio Ideaal: (FM 105.1, 105.4, 105.8, 106.5, 107.7 Bronckhorst)
- RTV Voorst: (FM 105.3, 107.5 Veluwezoom)
- Rijnstreek FM: (FM 106.0 Wageningen)
- RN7: (FM 105.4, 105.7, 106.8, 107.0, 107.4, 107.8 Nijmegen)
- RTV 794: (FM 106.5 Heerde, 107.8 Epe)
- RTV Apeldoorn: (FM 105.5 Hoenderloo, 106.3 Uddel, 107.1 Apeldoorn)
- RTV Arnhem: (FM 105.9 Arnhem)
- RTV Nunspeet (FM 105.9 Nunspeet)
- RTV Slingeland: (FM 105.0 Winterswijk)
- RTV Veluwezoom: (FM 107.5 Brummen)
- SRC FM: (FM 95.6 Vijfheerenlanden, 105.1 Buren, 105.8 Culemborg, 106.2 West Betuwe)
- Studio Rheden: (FM 106.9 Dieren, Spankeren, Laag-Soeren and Ellecom, 107.2 Velp, Rozendaal, Rheden and De Steeg)
- Veluwe FM: (FM 105.0 Ermelo, 106.1 Putten, 107.7 Harderwijk)

=== Groningen ===
Regional public

- Radio Noord: (FM 97.5 Groningen)

Local public

- OOG Radio: (FM 106.6 Groningen, 107.0 Haren)
- REGIO FM: (FM 95.3 Bedum, 105.2 Hoogezand, 106.1 Siddeburen, 107.2 Slochteren, 107.6 Muntendam, 107.9 Scharmer)
- RTV 1: (FM 105.3 Stadskanaal, 106.9 Veendam)
- RTV GO!: (FM 105.8 Winschoten)
- RTV Zulthe: (FM 105.3 Marum)
- Radio Westerwolde: (FM 106.5 Ter Apel, 106.6 Bellingwolde, 107.0 Vlagtwedde, 107.3 Pekela)

=== Limburg ===
Regional public

- L1 Radio: (FM 95.3 Hulsberg, 100.3 Roermond and cable)

Local public

- 3Heuvelland: (FM 105.8 Maasdal, 107.2 Heuvelland)
- Bie Os: (FM 96.2 Urmond, 99.1 Geleen, 107.3 Sittard)
- Falcon Radio: (FM 94.3 Valkenburg)
- Maasland Radio: (FM 89.6 Nieuw-Bergen, 92.9 Wellerlooi, 107.7 Gennep)
- ML5 Radio: (FM 105.7 Heythuysen, 106.1 Maasbracht, 107.4 Roermond)
- Omreop Horst aan de Maas: (FM 107.1 Horst)
- Omroep P&M: (FM 92.5 Beesel)
- Omroep Venlo: (FM 96.9 Venlo)
- Omroep Venray: (FM 90.2 Veulen)
- RTV Maastricht: (FM 107.5 Maastricht)
- RTV Parkstad: (FM 89.2 Landgraaf)
- Weert FM: (FM 97.0 Nederweert, 107.5 Weert)

=== North Brabant ===
Regional public

- Omroep Brabant

Local public

- Lokaal 7: (FM 107.4 Sint-Michielsgestel)
- OKÉ FM : (FM 106.4 FM Aalburg)
- Boschtion FM: (FM 95.2 s'-Hertogenbosch and cable)
- Radio 8FM: (FM 89.2 Breda, 103.6 Tilburg, 97.4 Den Bosch, 89.3 Eindhoven, 95.2 Weert and cable)
- Radio Mexico: (FM 106.1 's-Hertogenbosch)
- Royaal FM: (FM 93.6 Eindhoven)

=== North Holland ===
Regional public

- NH Radio: (FM 88.9 Amsterdam, 88.7 Hilversum, 93.9 Alkmaar and cable)

Local public

- Caribbean FM: (FM 107.9 Amsterdam)
- Haarlem105: (FM 89.9 FM Haarlem)
- LOS Den Helder Radio: (FM 105.6 Den Helder)
- MeerRadio: (FM 105.5, 106.6 Haarlemmermeer)
- Noordkop Central: (FM 107.7 Schagen)
- On The Real FM: (FM 88.1 Haarlem)
- Radio Aalsmeer: (FM 105.9 Aalsmeer and Kudelstaart)
- Radio SALTO: (FM 99.4, 106.8 Amsterdam)
- Razo: (FM 105.2 Amsterdam)
- Rick FM: (FM 106.3 Uithoorn and De Kwakel)
- RTV80: (FM 105.9 Bergen, Egmond and Schoorl)
- RTV Noordkop: (FM 106.6 Hollands Kroon)
- RTV Zaanstreek: (FM 107.1 Zaandam)
- Studio DMN: (FM 106.1 Diemen)
- ZFM: (FM 106.9 Zandvoort)

=== Overijssel ===
Regional public

- Radio Oost: (FM 99.4 North West Overijssel, 97.9 Deventer, 95.6 Zuid Salland, 89.4 Twente and cable, DTT and satellite)

Local public

- DNO Radio: (FM 106.6 North Overijssel)
- Radio 350: (FM 92.3 Rijssen and cable)

=== South Holland ===
Regional public

- Radio West 89.30 FM
- Radio Rijnmond

Local public

- Den Haag FM: (FM 92.0 The Hague, cable and DTT)
- OPEN Rotterdam: (FM 93.9 Rotterdam, cable and DTT)
- Sleutelstad FM: (FM 93.7 Leiden and cable)
- RTV Katwijk

=== Utrecht ===
Regional public

- Radio M Utrecht: (FM 93.1, 97.9 Rhenen)

Local public

- Bingo FM: (FM 105.7 Utrecht, 107.9 Amersfoort)
- LOS Radio: (FM 107.5 Bunschoten)
- Midland FM: (FM 104.9 Veenendaal, FM 105.6 Renswoude, FM 106.3 Scherpenzeel)

=== Zeeland ===
Regional public

- Omroep Zeeland

== Internet radio ==
Many public and commercial radio stations broadcast a number of themed, online sister stations. Most stations broadcast non-stop music with NOS or ANP news bulletins on the hour.

Campus radio

- Feelin Radio (Inholland University, Haarlem)
- NPO Campus

Public

- NPO Radio 1
- NPO Radio 2
- NPO 3FM
- NPO Klassiek
- NPO Radio 5
- NPO FunX (FunX Arab, FunX Fissa, FunX Hip Hop, FunX Latin, FunX Afro and FunX Vibes)
- NPO Sterren NL
- NPO Blend
- NPO Politiek en Nieuws

Commercial

- Radio 538 (538 90's, 538 Classics, 538 Dance Department, 538 Hitzone, 538 Ibiza, 538 Non-stop, 538 Party, 538 Top 50, 538 Zomer, 538 Octhendshow and 538 Tomorrowland One World Radio)
- Sky Radio (Sky Radio Hits, Sky Radio Love Songs, Sky Radio Non-stop, Sky Radio @ Work, Sky Radio Smooth Hits, Sky Radio 80's, Sky Radio 90's, Sky Radio Top 1000, Sky Radio Dance Classics (Jan-Jun), Sky Radio Summer Hits (Jun-Oct) and Sky Radio The Christmas Station (Oct-Dec))
- Radio 10 (Radio 10 Non-stop, Radio 10 Gold Disco Classics, Radio 10 Top 4000, Radio 10 60s & 70s Hits, Radio 10 80s Hits, Radio 10 90s Hits and Radio 10 Soul & Jazz)
- Radio Noordzee
- Qmusic (Qmusic Non-stop, Qmusic Het Foute Uur, Qmusic Easy, Qmusic Energy, Qmusic 90s & 00s, Qmusic 10s, Qmusic Top 40, Qmusic Summer (Jun-Oct) and Qmusic Xmas (Dec))
- Joe (Joe Non-stop)
- Radio Veronica (Veronica '80s, Veronica '90s, Veronica Rock Radio and Radio Veronica Top 3000)
- SLAM! (SLAM! Housuh In De Pauzuh, SLAM! Mixmarathon, SLAM! '90s, SLAM! '00s, SLAM! '10s, SLAM! Non-stop, SLAM! The Boom Room, SLAM! WKNDMX and SLAM! Juize)
- 100% NL (100% NL Feest, 100% NL '70s & '80s, 100 % NL '90s & '00s and 100% NL Non-stop)
- Sublime (Sublime Jazz, Sublime Soul Classics, Sublime R&B '90s & '00s and Sublime Sunday Chill)
- BNR Nieuwsradio (BNR Business Beats)
- Arrow (Arrow Caz)
- Pinguin Radio Pinguin Radio | Discover new artists and their music!
- Radio Continiu (Radio Continiu Non-stop, Radio Continiu Rosamunde and Radio Continiu 80's & 90's)
- KINK (KINK 80's, KINK 90's, KINK Distortion and KINK Indie)

Non Commercial

- Danceradio (Amsterdam) www.danceradio.nl
- Echobox Radio (Amsterdam) www.echobox.radio

== Premium radio ==
There were two subscription cable radio services operated in the Netherlands: Music Choice and XLnt Radio. But the two services have since merged after Stingray Digital in Canada acquired them.

=== XLnt Radio ===
Previously, XLnt Radio ran 52 full-time music channels and is available through Caiway:

- XLnt Kiddo FM
- XLnt Hip Hop
- XLnt R&B
- XLnt Trance
- XLnt Dance
- XLnt Hits
- XLnt Party
- XLnt Lounge
- XLnt Chill Out
- XLnt Today's Pop
- XLnt Nederpop
- XLnt Arabian Nights
- XLnt Turk
- XLnt Alternative Rock
- XLnt Hard Rock
- XLnt Rock
- XLnt New Age
- XLnt Easy Listening
- XLnt Classic Rock
- XLnt Piratenhits
- XLnt Salsa
- XLnt Dance Classics
- XLnt Comedy
- XLnt Country
- XLnt Love Songs
- XLnt Motown
- XLnt Reggae
- XLnt Italia
- XLnt France
- XLnt Espana
- XLnt Blues
- XLnt Oldies
- XLnt Nederpop Gold
- XLnt Schlager
- XLnt Rock N Roll
- XLnt Classical
- XLnt Jazz
- XLnt Classic Jazz
- XLnt NL Luisterlied
- XLnt Nostalgie
- XLnt Kleuterliedjes
- XLnt Skihut
- XLnt JackFM
- XLnt Film
- XLnt Relipop
- XLnt Christmas
- XLnt Musical
- XLnt Opera
- XLnt Operette
- XLnt Crooners
- XLnt Fanfare
- XLnt Etalagekanaal

=== Music Choice ===
Previously, Music Choice ran full-time music channels on the Ziggo and UPC cable networks:

- 60s
- 70s
- 80er - Germany
- 80s
- 90er - Germany
- 90s
- 2000s
- All Day Party
- Arabic
- The Alternative - Germany
- The Alternative - UK
- Bass, Breaks & Beats
- Blues
- Bollywood Hits
- Carnival - Germany
- Chansons
- Chillout
- Classic R'n'B & Soul
- Classic Rock
- Classical Calm
- Classical Greats
- Classical India
- Classical Orchestral
- Cocktail Lounge
- Cool Jazz
- Country
- Dancefloor Fillers
- Drive
- East African Gospel
- Freedom
- Freedom - Sweden
- Groove (Disco & Funk)
- Harder Than Hell
- Hindi Gold
- Hip Hop
- Indie Classics
- Jazz Classics
- Kids
- Kids - Germany
- New Age
- Punjabi
- Reggae
- Revival (60s & 70s)
- Revival (60s & 70s)- Germany
- Rewind (80s & 90s)
- Rewind (80s & 90s) - Germany
- Rewind (80s & 90s)- Sweden
- Rock Anthems
- Rock Anthems - Germany
- Rock'n'Roll
- South Africa Gospel
- South Africa Modern
- South Africa Traditional
- Schlager
- Schlager - Sweden
- Silk (Love Songs)
- Sounds of South India
- Swiss Hits
- Total Hits - Belgium (a.k.a. Belpop)
- Total Hits - France
- Total Hits - Germany
- Total Hits - Germany
- Total Hits - Italy
- Total Hits - East Africa
- Total Hits - Netherlands
- Total Hits - Nordic
- Total Hits - Spain
- Total Hits - Sweden
- Total Hits - UK
- Türk Müzigi
- Trance FM
- Urban
- Urban - Germany
- Volksmusik
- World Carnival
- Xmas / New Years
- Xmas / New Years Germany

== Low power AM ==
With the cessation of NPO Radio 5's broadcasts on 747 kHz and 1251 kHz in late 2015, the Dutch government opened a public consultation on opening up the medium waveband for low powered broadcasting. In May 2016, it was formally announced that 747, 828, 1035, 1251, and 1395 kHz (previously used by full-power stations) would have a maximum transmission power of 100 watts, while 1485 kHz would have a maximum transmission power of 1 watt.
