= Omroep West =

Dutch regional public broadcaster

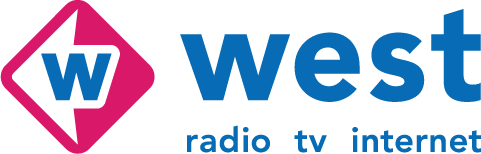
- Country: Netherlands
- TV stations: TV West
- Radio stations: Radio West
- Headquarters: Laan van 's-Gravenmade 2, The Hague
- Broadcast area: Northern South Holland
- Launch date: 1 January 1987 (radio); 2 November 1996 (TV)
- Former names: RTV West
- Picture format: 16:9 1080i HDTV
- Radio frequency: FM 89.3 MHz
- Webcast: TV; Radio
- Official website: omroepwest.nl
- Language: Dutch

Omroep West (lit. 'West Broadcasting') is a Dutch regional public broadcaster headquartered in The Hague. It was founded in 2001 after the merger of Radio West and TV West.

Radio West began broadcasting radio on 1 January 1987, and the first television broadcast occurred on 2 November 1996. Omroep West cooperates with local broadcasters, including Stadsomroep Den Haag (The Hague) and Sleutelstad FM (Leiden).

== Broadcast area ==
Omroep West serves the northern subregions of South Holland, including the following municipalities:

1. Alphen aan den Rijn
2. Bodegraven-Reeuwijk
3. Delft
4. Gouda
5. Hillegom
6. Kaag en Braassem
7. Katwijk
8. Krimpenerwaard
9. Leiden
10. Leiderdorp
11. Leidschendam-Voorburg
12. Lisse
13. Midden-Delfland
14. Nieuwkoop
15. Noordwijk
16. Oegstgeest
17. Pijnacker-Nootdorp
18. Rijswijk
19. Teylingen
20. The Hague
21. Voorschoten
22. Waddinxveen
23. Wassenaar
24. Westland
25. Zoetermeer
26. Zoeterwoude
27. Zuidplas
