= Radio Veronica (Talpa Radio) =

Dutch radio station

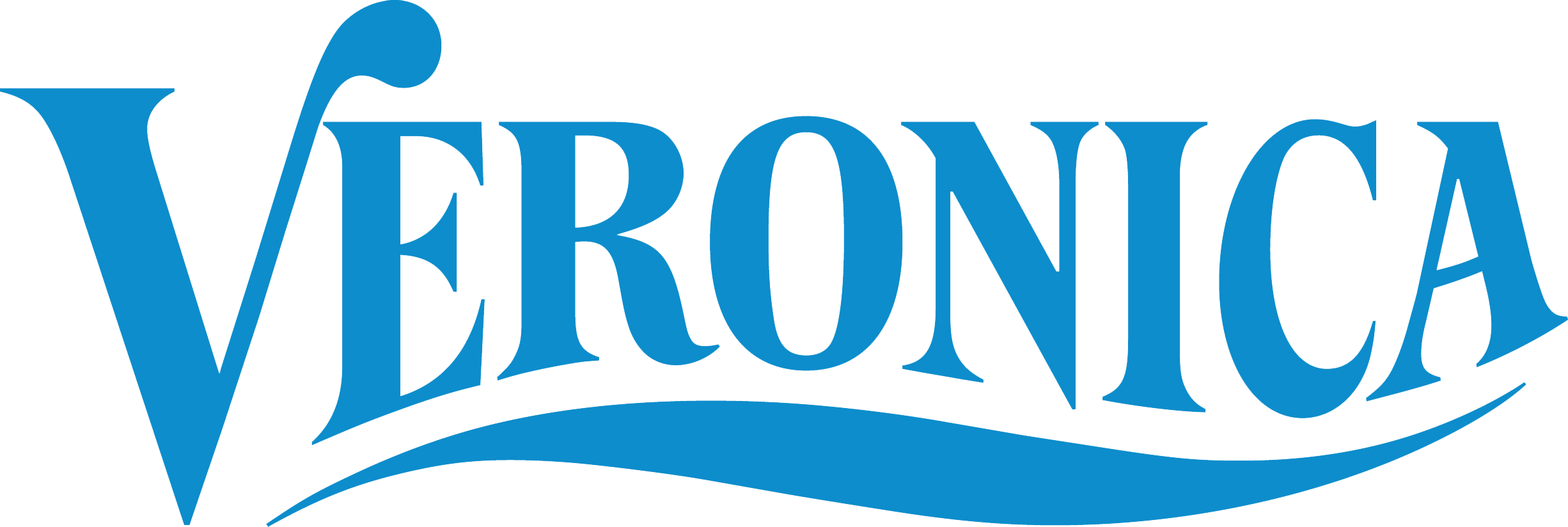
- Netherlands
- Broadcast area: Netherlands

Programming
- Format: Pop and Rock (Adult Contemporary) (widely 1970s-today)

Ownership
- Owner: Mediahuis Nederland
- Sister stations: 100% NL; SLAM! Sublime; Sunlite

History
- First air date: August 31, 2003
- Former call signs: Radio 103, de Gouwe Ouwe Zender (2003)

Links
- Webcast: Veronica Listen Live; Watch Live Radio; Non-Stop Music; Top 1000 Allertijden; Veronica 80's Hits; Veronica 90's Hits; Veronica 00's Top 500; Veronica Rock Radio; Playlist
- Website: Radio Veronica

Radio Veronica is a Dutch commercial radio station owned by Mediahuis since June 2023, before that it was a subsidiary of Talpa Network. The station runs a mixed playlist of pop and rock music from the 1970s until the 2000s, additional with current hits.

It can be compared with Absolute Radio and Radio X (United Kingdom) in the United Kingdom.

== History ==
Radio Veronica in its present form was created on 31 August 2003 by a merger of the cable station Radio Veronica of the Vereniging Veronica and the golden oldie station Radio 103 of Sky Radio Ltd. In return, the Vereniging Veronica received 3.5% of the shares of Sky Radio Ltd.

In 2006, this interest was expanded to 10%, after the Telegraaf Media Groep NV (TMG) and ING acquired the Sky Radio Group and those in Sienna Holding BV - operating under the name Sky Radio Group accommodated. In 2007, TMG acquired 85% (now 22.85%) of the firm owned and thus control over the company.

The brand "Radio Veronica" has a long heritage in the Netherlands going back to the offshore station (VRON) in the 1960s and early 1970s, later becoming (as VOO) part of the Dutch public broadcasting system before once again becoming a private venture. However, the station/brand has undergone several changes of ownership since.

Radio Veronica is comparable to NPO Radio 2 by their similarity of decades (1970s–today). The only difference is that NPO Radio 2 does play more genres than rock music.

In April 2023 Talpa Network sold the station to Mediahuis, due to a legal change it was no longer allowed for a single party to hold more than three FM frequencies.

== Fluctuations ==
Uunco Cerfontaine was since 2003 the program director of the station. Early 2013 was Niels Hoogland appointed as program director. On 4 November 2013 the station was a new course. This meant the dismissal of Erwin Peters, Bart van Leeuwen, Luc van Rooij and Dennis Hoebee. The change did not achieve a higher market share. Between January 2013 and October 2014, the market share decreased by 2%. Also Rob van Someren was replaced in autumn 2014 by Jeroen van Inkel. Niels Hoogland was replaced on 1 November 2014 by Erik de Zwart.

Erik de Zwart presented on 2 February 2015 a new programming. In this new course old items, such as "De Stemband", "De plaat en zijn verhaal" and Veronica FM program "Rinkeldekinkel" returned. The design of the station appears again in the eighties, but adapted to the present time. Further De Zwart took the DJs Bart Van Leeuwen and Dennis Hoebee back.

== Charts ==
=== Current ===
- Top 1000 allertijden
- Album Top 1000 allertijden
- 80s Top 880
- 90s Top 590
- 00s Top 500
- Top 500 van de 21ste eeuw
- Top 40 Hitdossier
- RockHits Top 500
- Download Top 1000 allertijden

=== Former ===
- De Download Top 750
- 70s Top 270
- Soulshow Top 100

== Spin-off stations ==
Radio Veronica and former radio and TV personnel also broadcast a number of spin-off stations which are available only via the Internet:

- Veronica Top 1000 Allertijden
- Veronica Rock Radio
- Veronica Hit Radio
- Veronica Vintage
- Radio Veronica 80's Hits
- Radio Veronica 90's Hits
- Radio Veronica Drive-in Show
- Veronica Comedy Radio
- Wave Radio
- Flower Power Radio
- Baars Classic Rock
- LX Classics
- Radio 192
- ABTT
- Buma Rocks

== Logos ==
Used from 31 August 2003 to 2005

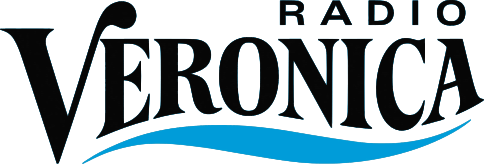
Used from 2005 to 30 April 2010

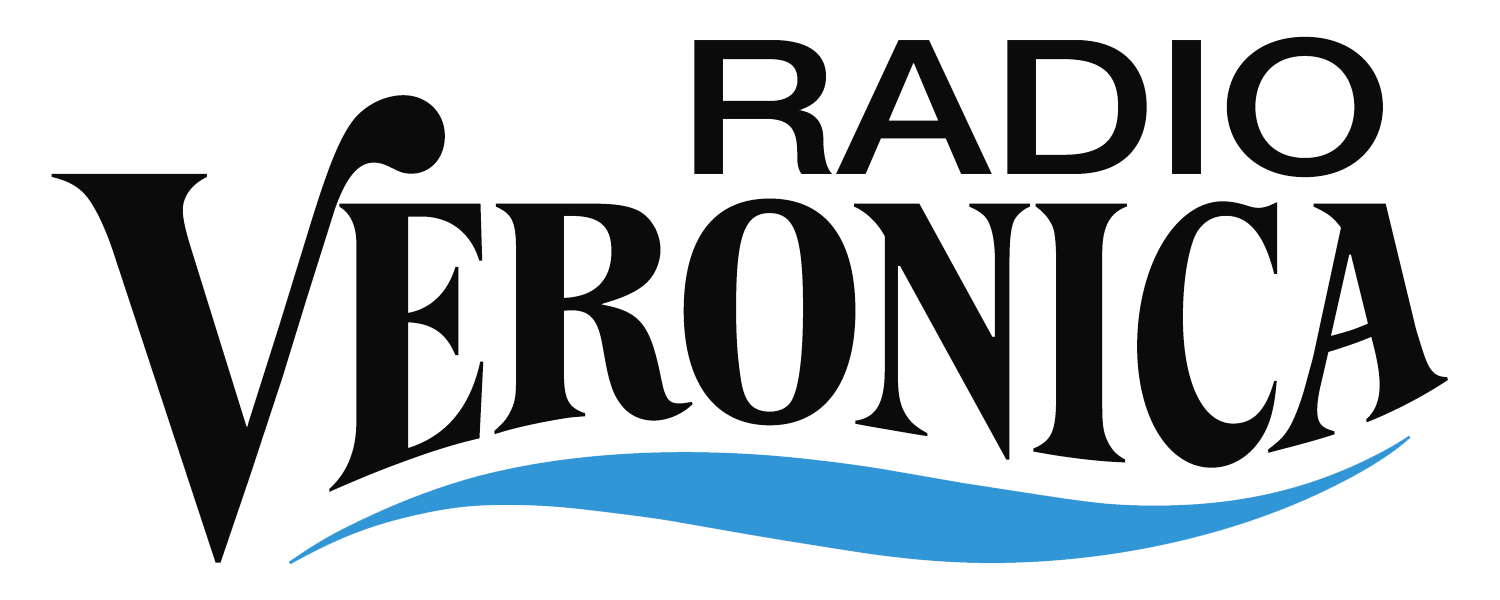
Used from 1 May 2010 to 18 November 2014

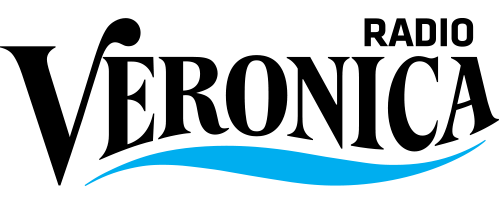
Used since 19 November 2014

== See also ==
- List of radio stations in the Netherlands
