= Rick van Velthuysen =

Dutch radio DJ (born 1961)

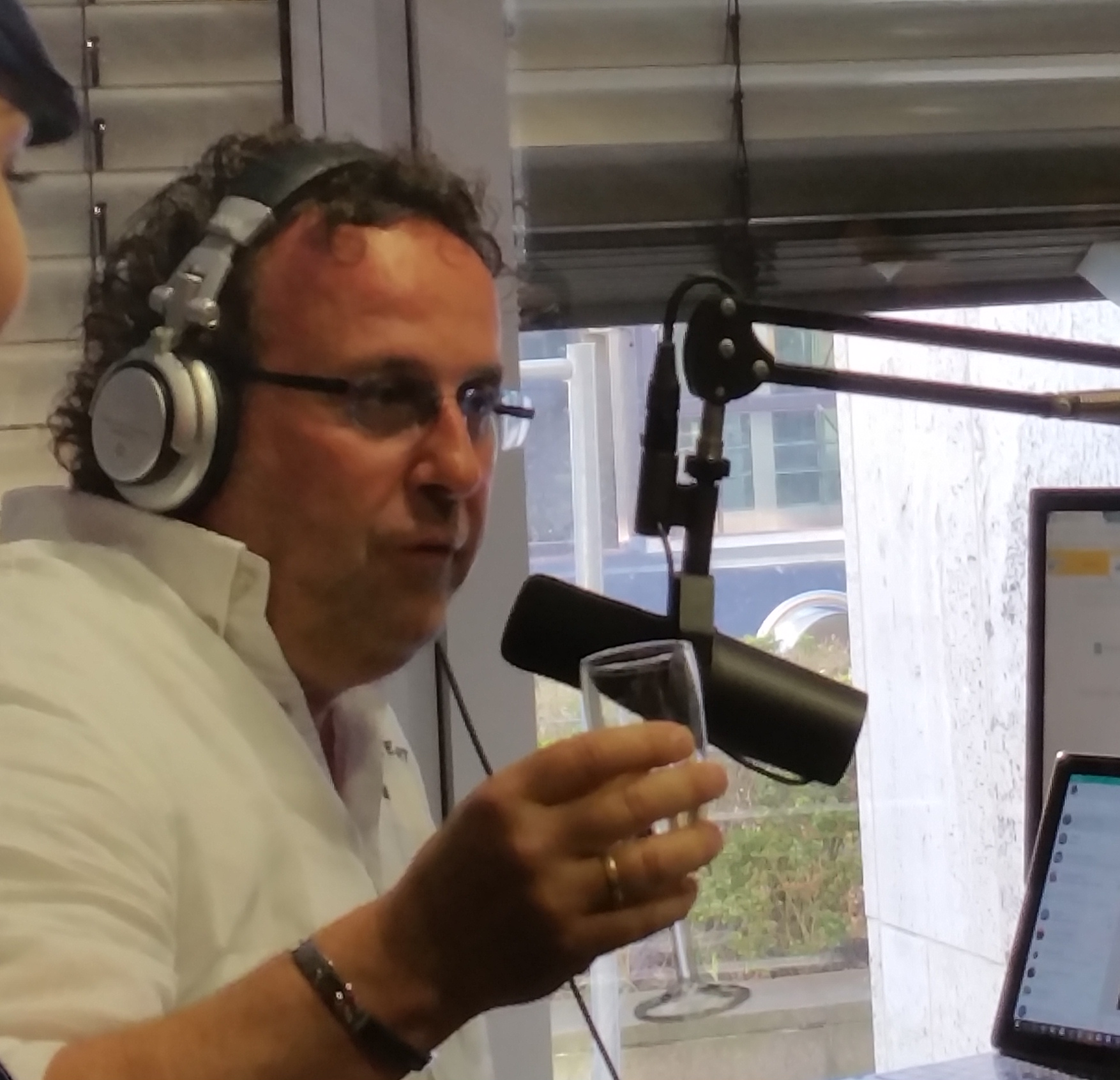
Rick van Velthuysen

Rick van Velthuysen (Dutch pronunciation: [ˈrɪk fɑɱ ˈvɛltɦœyzə(n)]; (Note: In isolation, van is pronounced [vɑn].) born 15 September 1961) is a Dutch radio DJ.

Born in Rotterdam, Van Velthuysen started his career at the age of 18 with Radio Bollenstreek. In 1985 he became a DJ with KRO and had a gameshow with Peter van Dam Peter van Dam (dj). He moved to AVRO in 1986 and when Kas van Iersel Kas van Iersel left Radio 3, Van Velthuysen began hosting Top Pop. In December 1992 Erik de Zwart asked Van Velthuysen to help start Radio 538 where he worked for over 14 years. Since September 2008 Van Velthuysen has worked for Radio Veronica and also hosts his own program on Spanish radio called "Hallo Costa Olanda" for Dutch expatriates in Spain.

Since 5 November 2018, Van Velthuysen works for NPO Radio 2.
