= SLAM! (radio station) =

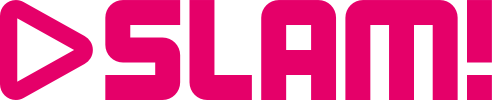
- Amsterdam; Netherlands
- Broadcast area: Netherlands
- Frequencies: FM: 96.1 MHz (Roermond); 98.0 MHz (Amsterdam); 98.0 MHz (The Hague); 98.3 MHz (Alkmaar); 103.2 MHz (Maastricht); DAB+: 11C (nationwide); 8B (North Holland and Flevoland); 7C (North Brabant and Limburg)

Programming
- Format: Pop/Dance/Electro (Rhythmic Contemporary) (1990s-today)

Ownership
- Owner: Mediahuis Nederland
- Sister stations: 100% NL; Radio Veronica; Sublime

History
- First air date: 1996 / 2005 as Slam!FM
- Former call signs: ID&T Radio (2001–2005); NEW Dance Radio (1996–2000)
- Call sign meaning: Sound, lifestyle and more

Links
- Webcast: SLAM! Player; SLAM! Non-Stop; SLAM! Housuh in de Pauzuh; SLAM! 40; SLAM! 00's SLAM! Hardstyle; SLAM! MixMarathon; SLAM! Juize; SLAM! The Boom Room
- Website: www.slam.nl

SLAM! (Sound, Lifestyle and More, stylized as ►SLAM! and previously SLAM!FM) is a Dutch commercial national radio station that plays current-based rhythmic pop and dance music. Its playlist and presentation serves as a combination of 538 and 3FM. The station distinguishes itself by playing extensive mix shows featuring various DJs every Friday and Saturday in the SLAM! MixMarathon. Additionally, it has had its own chart chart since 2005 and its own television channel since 2007. SLAM! broadcasts in the Netherlands and can be received via FM in the Randstad and parts of Limburg, internet (worldwide) and cable. Its broadcasting building and studios are located in Amsterdam, North Holland. It is a sister station of 100% NL, Radio Veronica and Sublime.

== History ==
=== ID&T Radio ===
New Dance Radio, as the station was called at launch, began broadcasting in the mid-1990s. At the time, the station was available exclusively via cable and the format consisted mainly of dance music. In 2000, the station was acquired by event organization ID&T, which subsequently renamed it Slam FM. (named after one of ID&T's dance & lifestyle magazines at the time, Slam). A year later, on June 1, 2001, the station received yet another new name, ID&T Radio, reflecting ID&T's strategy at the time to bundle all activities under one brand name, i.e. ID&T).

ID&T Radio successfully bid for a nationwide FM frequency in the spring of 2003 and changed its format to a more mainstream Top 40 genre, at least in its daytime programming schedule, whether in alternative remixing to comply with the rules on their airwave frequency-plot were imposed. Afterwards ID&T was accused and partially successfully sued by some competitors to have failed to meet its license requirements (including a playlist maximum of 7.5% chart-oriented hits and a minimum of 50% hits not older than one year).

=== SLAM!FM ===
On January 31, 2005 the station regained the name it had previously used for a year: SLAM!FM (this time with an exclamation mark in its name and logo, and written in all capitals; no further connections with the heretofore mentioned lifestyle magazine which ID&T had discontinued in the meantime). The station began to focus primarily on young people. Subsequently, various minor format changes followed. As of 2023, in addition to dance music, pop and urban music are also broadcast.

At the end of 2005, Duncan Stutterheim sold 66% of the station's shares to former Veronica and Radio 538 director Lex Harding and Ruud Hendriks on behalf of ID&T.

In June 2006, majority shareholders Harding and Hendriks filed a lawsuit against Stutterheim because they refused to buy the remaining 33% of the SLAM!FM shares for 2.5 million euros. Harding and Hendriks believed that they had already paid too much for the earlier block of shares. The judge ruled in their favor.

Following the radio station, SLAM!TV was founded on February 1, 2007. The channel, for and by young people, broadcasts popular music videos. In addition, viewers could upload their self-made videos, photos and audio files and make them available to friends and/or other visitors to the site. The channel later also began developing its own short programs and broadcasting radio programs in their entirety.

On March 20, 2007, the court prohibited SLAM!FM from continuing to compete improperly with Radio 538 by playing 're-edits' and remixes of music from the charts. This was because SLAM!FM was broadcasting on a restricted frequency where this was not permitted. According to the court, the station also incorrectly counted background music during conversations as music, believing it could meet the requirement that music must be played 95% of the time between 07:00 and 19:00 during the day. On appeal, the CBb ruled on this matter on December 5, 2007, and SLAM!FM was found to be in the right regarding "too much speech" but found to be in the wrong regarding 're-edits'. However, the ruling had no consequences for the music content, as SLAM!FM had not broadcast its own edits for quite some time.

On November 19, 2008, as a result of the consequences of the credit crisis and declining revenues, it was announced that SLAM!FM would undergo a reorganization. Shareholder 2HMedia did not provide additional funding, forcing the station to manage its staff more efficiently. Of the approximately 32 people who were employed full-time in 2007, only about 20 remained after the reorganization. Among those who left were disc jockeys Daniël Lippens and Timo Kamst. Also, the expiring contracts of several staff members were not renewed.

RTL Nederland acquired Zerobase Lot A05 in April 2011. This acquisition took effect on June 1, 2011. Just over six months later, on January 1, 2012, SLAM!FM came into the hands of Talpa as a result of a deal between Talpa and RTL.

On November 2, 2013, Menno de Boer left SLAM!FM and moved to radio station 538. This led to the program 'Most Wanted' being taken over by DJ Martijn La Grouw.

On January 6, 2014, De Avondploeg moved to Radio 538. The program took over Mark Labrand's old time slot on that station. The old time slot on SLAM!FM was taken over by Igmar Felicia with his program Bij Igmar as of that day.

=== SLAM! ===
On August 31, 2015, the station's name was changed from SLAM!FM to SLAM!. When Talpa acquired full control of RadioCorp in May 2016 by buying out Telegraaf Media Groep, it was decided to divest the station. SLAM! and 100% NL were sold to one of RadioCorp's original owners, Karl Habsburg.

On October 3, 2016, it was announced that Talpa Media sold SLAM! and SLAM!TV to RadioCorp.

In the spring of 2023, it was announced that the Belgian media organization Mediahuis had acquired all shares of SLAM! owner RadioCorp from the three owners Karl Habsburg, Herbert Visser and Carlo de Boer. After the acquisition, the day-to-day management, consisting of De Boer and Visser, remained in place.

On September 1, 2023, SLAM! lost its nationwide FM package and switched to a regional FM package from Qmusic's sister station Joe. Since then, the station can only be received in the Randstad via FM and nationwide via DAB+, cable and the internet.

On October 23, 2023, as a result of its loss of marketshare, SLAM! cut in its programming, which resulted in Martijn La Grouw moving to 100% NL.

On March 15, 2025, two new DJs were introduced in SLAM!'s Sunday program, namely Florian Hamelink and Jeske van Trigt.

On May 18, 2025, Gijs Alkemade announced during episode 561 that he would stop hosting The Boom Room on June 7, 2025, exactly 11 years after the first broadcast. The program is now hosted by Raoul Schram.

From September 1, 2025, the station can also be received in parts of Limburg via FM.

== Studio ==
SLAM! was based in Naarden, North Holland, until the weekend of September 28, 2024, where the station shared the building with sister stations 100% NL and Radio Veronica. That weekend, SLAM! and 100% NL moved to new studios at the Mediahuis Nederland headquarters on Basisweg in Amsterdam. Radio Veronica would follow later, but its new studio had not yet been completed.

== Current DJs ==
- Alok
- Anoûl Hendriks
- Claptone
- Danny Blom
- Dimitri Vegas & Like Mike
- Eelke Kleijn
- Erik-Jan Rosendahl
- Fedde Le Grand
- Florian Hamelink
- Franky Rizardo
- Hielke Boersma
- Jarno van der Wielen
- Jeske van Trigt
- Jochem Hamerling
- Joris Voorn
- Julia Maan
- Marijn Oosterveen
- Mau P
- Mike Williams
- Nicky Romero
- Oliver Heldens
- Oliver Weiter
- Patrick Wolda
- R3hab
- Raoul Schram
- Secret Cinema
- Solardo
- Thomas van Empelen
- Vintage Culture

== Former DJs ==
- Alex Oosterveen
- Armin van Buuren
- Bram Krikke
- Daniël Lippens
- Dave Leusink
- Dimitris Kops
- DJ Jean
- Dash Berlin
- Emile van Schaik
- Eric van Kleef
- Erwin van der Bliek
- Ferry Corsten
- Frank Dane
- Gijs Alkemade
- Hardwell
- Headhunterz
- Koen van Tijn
- Kristel van Eijk
- Igmar Felicia
- Ivo van Breukelen
- Jeroen Post
- Jordi Warners
- Jurjen Gofers
- Lange Frans
- Lars van Heeswijk
- Lex Gaarthuis
- Lucas Degen
- Mark Labrand
- Maurice Verschuuren
- Menno de Boer
- Mental Theo
- Michael Blijleven
- Niels de Koning
- Nicky Verhage
- Rob Toonen
- Robin Velderman
- Tamara Brinkman
- Timo Kamst
- Tom van der Weerd

== Programs ==
Program	DJ(s)
Normal programs
Marijn Oosterveen	Marijn Oosterveen
De SLAM! Ochtendshow	Anoûl Hendriks Marijn Oosterveen
Patrick Wolda	Patrick Wolda
Housuh in de Pauzuh	Thomas van Empelen (Monday to Thursday at 12:00-14:00)
Housuh in de Pauzuh	Hielke Boersma (Weekend at 12:00-14:00)
Thomas van Empelen	Thomas van Empelen
SLAM! Middagshow	Jarno van der Wielen, Erik-Jan Rosendahl & Julia Maan
SLAM! Non-Stop	-
SLAM!40	Anoûl Hendriks
Hielke Boersma	Hielke Boersma
SLAM! WKNDMX	Hielke Boersma
SLAM! MixMarathon Chart	Raoul Schram
Raoul Schram	Raoul Schram
Anoûl Hendriks	Anoûl Hendriks
Danny Blom	Danny Blom
Florian Hamelink	Florian Hamelink
Jeske van Trigt	Jeske van Trigt
Dance programs Friday 6am-6am
SLAM! MixMarathon	Jarno van der Wielen, Thomas van Empelen, Raoul Schram, Hielke Boersma, Oliver Heldens, Nicky Romero, R3hab, Alok, Fedde Le Grand, Mau P, Mike Williams, Dimitri Vegas and Like Mike, Solardo, Vintage Culture and Claptone
Saturday 8pm-6am
The Boom Room	Raoul Schram & Jochem Hamerling
Spectrum Radio	Joris Voorn
Eelke Kleijn	Eelke Kleijn
Secret Cinema	Secret Cinema
Jochem Hamerling	Jochem Hamerling
Franky Rizardo	Franky Rizardo
Oliver Weiter	Oliver Weiter

== Market share ==
In 2012, it was announced that SLAM! has the largest market share among the country's young people (16.8%).

In 2016, SLAM! was reported to have a 0% market share for the 65-or-more age group. Carlo de Boer, SLAM!'s General Manager, then argued that SLAM! listeners were 30 years old in average, and that this market share "distinguished" SLAM! from other radio stations.

As of May 10, 2023, the station's overall market share was 1.9%.

== Logos ==
Used from January 31, 2005 to June 29, 2006

Used from June 30, 2006 to August 30, 2015

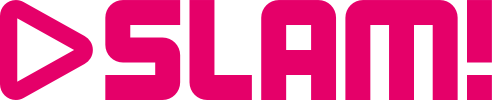
Used since August 31, 2015

== Awards ==
=== Marconi Award ===
SLAM! managed to win a Marconi Award twice, both in the Aanstormend Talent (Emerging Talent) category. The first was won by Igmar Felicia in 2014. In 2018, Bram Krikke followed as the winner. In 2024, SLAM! secured another Marconi Award, namely the one for Beste Zender 2023 (Best Station 2023).

=== Gouden RadioRing ===
De Avondploeg was the first SLAM! program to be nominated for the Golden RadioRing for Beste Radioprogramma (Best Radio Program). On both occasions, in 2011 and 2012, the program failed to win. Other programs were also nominated for the RadioRing, such as Bij Igmar (2015), Club Ondersteboven (2018 and 2019) and The Boom Room (2020), but did not win. Bram Krikke did manage to win the Zilveren RadioSter Man (Silver RadioStar Male Award) twice, in 2018 and 2019.

== See also ==
- List of radio stations in the Netherlands
