= Slam!TV =

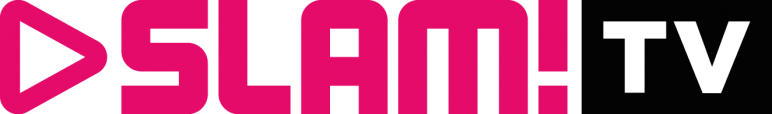
- Country: Netherlands
- Broadcast area: Netherlands

Programming
- Picture format: 576i (16:9, SD)

Ownership
- Owner: Radiocorp B.V.
- Sister channels: 100% NL TV

History
- Launched: 1 February 2007; 18 years ago

Links
- Website: www.slamtv.nl/

Availability

Streaming media
- Ziggo GO: ZiggoGO.tv (Europe only)
- SLAM!.nl: Watch Live

Slam!TV is a youth music television channel that airs dance and pop music videos which can be requested by listeners through SMS. Radio station Slam!FM launched the channel on 1 February 2007. The channel is owned by Radiocorp. The channel broadcasts 24 hours a day. It airs across the Netherlands.

On 3 October 2016, it was announced that Talpa Media sold SLAM! and Slam!TV to Radiocorp.

== Logos ==
2007-2015

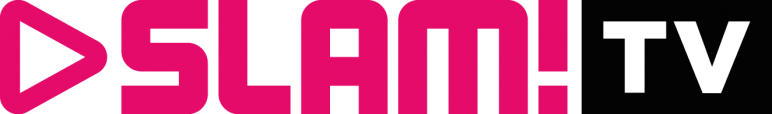
2015–present

== See also ==
- Slam!
