= NPO 3FM =

Dutch national radio station

- Netherlands

Programming
- Format: CHR/Alternative/Indie (1980s-today)

Ownership
- Owner: NPO
- Sister stations: NPO Radio 1 NPO Radio 2 NPO Klassiek; NPO Radio 5 NPO FunX; NPO Sterren NL; NPO Blend

History
- First air date: October 11, 1965; 61 years ago (as Hilversum 3)

Links
- Webcast: Radioplayer; 3FM Webstream; Raw audio stream
- Website: www.npo3fm.nl

NPO 3FM is a Dutch rhythmic CHR radio station controlled by public broadcaster NPO. The vast majority of the songs played on-air are rock, alternative, indie and pop, though dance and Mega Top 30 tracks may also air at times.

== History ==
=== As Radio 3 ===
Launching on 11 October 1965, NPO 3FM was created as Hilversum 3 (later Radio 3) by the Minister for Culture and Social Recreation, Maarten Vrolijk, to counterbalance the popular new offshore stations such as Radio Veronica. It broadcast so-called "vertical programming". Due to the nature of the Dutch public broadcasting system, with several broadcasters being awarded airtime based on the numbers of paying members they have, NPO 3FM hosted radio shows by a different broadcaster daily (respectively: AVRO, VARA, EO+VPRO, TROS, Veronica, NCRV and KRO). The station was quickly popular because of this 'unpredictable' style and diversity (as an example, Christian broadcaster EO used to broadcast Christian-themed programs (including a request show with religious music), followed by the now legal Radio Veronica with a format based on Top 40-pop). It mainly focused on a young audience with a mostly pop format, so that there was a clear identity. The NOS was live horizontally from Monday to Saturday evening between 18:00 and 19:00.

Radio 3 added numerous FM frequencies on 1 December 1985, when on the same day it adopted its current name.

The dawn of commercial competition and changing ideas about modern radio forced Radio 3 to overhaul its format drastically from 4 January 1992. First, three broadcasters (NCRV, KRO and AVRO) decided to join forces and introduced Station 3 in January 1992, with a horizontal format for three days from 6am to midnight (Saturdays, Sundays and Mondays), with programs hosted by DJs from these three broadcasters. As from Monday 5 October 1992, Radio 3 went completely horizontal, with each public broadcaster losing its own designated day (except Veronica on Saturday and TROS on Sunday) but getting a fixed and daily time slot instead.

The rise of commercial radio at the beginning of the 1990s led to a decrease in audience. Ferry Maat, TROS' programming director on Radio 2 and 3, feared early listening figures would be worse due to the relocation of the TROS from Thursday to Sunday. Paul van der Lugt was appointed as the channel coordinator in April 1992 and had to ensure that Radio 3 got a clearer identity. To do this, the station got a new slogan (de jongste zender van Nederland, "the youngest channel in the Netherlands"), and a logo (a chick, to emphasize the concept of young). Furthermore, relatively unknown music was played between new and old hits (sandwich formula), and more attention was paid to live music and pop festivals.

=== As Radio 3FM ===
In January 1994, Radio 3 got full national FM coverage. To emphasize that, the name of the station was changed to Radio 3FM. The medium wave transmitter was no longer needed and switched to Radio 10 Gold. However, the public pop-channel lost the number one position in audiences to Sky Radio in 1995.

There was more and more cooperation between the various broadcasting associations to make Radio 3FM sound as a whole. However, Veronica left the public order for a commercial adventure on 1 September 1995. The TROS therefore moved to Saturday on the next day (de zinderende zaterdag, "the sizzling Saturday"). The broadcasting time for Sunday was divided over several broadcasters with a lot of attention for album music or alternative sounds.

As of 1997, a special music editor was released, separate from the broadcasters. In collaboration with the DJs, this determines to date which music can be played on the channel during the day, which makes the channel recognizable, but also predictable.

In September 2003 Florent Luyckx was appointed as new channel coordinator, who is partly responsible for a number of (controversial) changes. To refresh the station's branding, the name was shortened to "3FM", and a new logo in graffiti style was created, which was associated to the new slogan for the station: "Serious Radio". The idea was to focus the station more into music; evidenced by the new motto Als je van muziek houdt, dan luister je naar 3FM ("If you love music, you listen to 3FM"). This caused Henk Westbroek, Cobus Bosscha and Isabelle Brinkman to leave the station. Although this gave opportunities to new young radio creators, the changes were not well received by the audience.

Logo used from 2003 to 2014

After the frequency distribution for commercial radio in 2003, the competition in the target group increased and in the second half of 2004 led to the departure of Rob Stenders, Patrick Kicken and Ruud de Wild. Many people predicted the downfall of 3FM. Schedule changed at least three times in two years. Stenders was succeeded by Giel Beelen and De Wild by Wouter van der Goes, who left 3FM in September 2006 for Qmusic and was succeeded by Coen Swijnenberg and Sander Lantinga. In 2007, Rob Stenders also returned. Eventually the station recovered its audience, making it to the top 5 in the end of 2007 and becoming the #1 radio station in the Netherlands in November and December 2013. From 2006 to 2013, the NTR broadcast Ekstra Weekend on Friday evening, which was one of the most popular radio programs in those days.

The influence of the 'music police' has become increasingly stronger over the years. Presenters of the VPRO late evening program 3VOOR12 told the station in 2005 that they felt "confined" to their freedom.

In 2007, 3FM won 4 Marconi Awards: Best Radio Station, Best Presenter (Giel Beelen), Best Program (GIEL), and Upcoming Talent (Domien Verschuuren). In 2009, 3FM was again nominated for a Marconi Award for best radio station. In the summer of that year the channel coordinator Florent Luyckx left the station and was replaced in October by Wilbert Mutsaers. In December 2011 3FM won 3 Marconi Awards: Silver Radio Stars (Annemieke Schollaardt and Gerard Ekdom), The Golden Radio Ring (Ekstra Weekend), and the Marconi Talent Award (Sander Hoogendoorn).

=== As NPO 3FM ===
Logo used from 2014 to 2017

On 19 August 2014, the name of the stations was changed to "NPO 3FM", incorporating the public broadcaster; "NPO" name and logo. In November of that year, Claudia de Breij announced to stop her Friday lunchtime show Claudia d'r op. A month later, Eric Corton also announced that he was leaving his "That's Live" program. He was replaced by Sander Hoogendoorn.

In October 2015, NPO 3FM celebrated its 50th anniversary by broadcasting for four days live from the island of Pampus, including a special television program about the 50 years of 3FM on NPO 3, and organizing an evening concert in Paradiso. Arjan Snijders published a book entitled 50 jaar 3FM: van Vrolijke Puinhoop naar Serious Radio ("50 years of 3FM: from Merry Mess to Serious Radio").

On 3 February 2015, it was announced that Coen Swijnenberg and Sander Lantinga (from the Coen and Sander Show) would switch to Radio 538 on 17 August. Their time slot was taken over from 1 June by Frank van der Lende. On 18 March 2015 it was announced that Gerard Ekdom was going to leave the radio station to move to NPO Radio 2 on 5 October to present the new morning show Ekdom In de Ochtend. With this, NPO 3FM quickly lost many important DJs. It managed to catch the departure of these DJs with young talents from their own DJ school. Eva Koreman was also taken from Qmusic to NPO 3FM.

In September 2016, Paul Rabbering and Timur Perlin left (to NPO Radio 2). On 7 November 2016, the schedule of NPO 3FM was completely renewed, and only Frank van der Lende's show (Monday-Thursday 4-6pm), 3voor12 Radio (Monday-Thursday 9-midnight) and Mega Top 50 (Saturday 2-4pm) stayed at the same time. Furthermore, all program titles were replaced by the first names of the DJs (except for the two latter shows). The slogan Serious Radio was removed after 13 years and switched to Music Starts Here (which somewhat modelled BBC Radio 1's famous Where It Begins). Furthermore, it meant that after 12 years Giel Beelen hosted his own morning show GI:EL, he was replaced by Domien Verschuuren between 6.00 and 9.00 (no longer till 10.00). Beelen went to present the On Stage program from Friday-Sunday 7-10pm. Due to the many changes the listening figures dropped sharply.

As of 2 September 2017, the schedule changed once again. Frank van der Lende lost the 'drive time' show to Mark van der Molen and Rámon Verkoeijen. Frank van der Lende took over the evening program of Giel Beelen, who left the station and BNNVARA. A striking change was further that two women, namely Eva Koreman and Angelique Houtveen, were programmed respectively in the 'lunchtime' and 'early afternoon' slots; in addition, a female DJ talent from their own radio school, Jorien Renkema, got a place in the weekend with on Saturday between 14.00 and 16.00 the Mega Top 50 and on Sunday at the same time slot a radio show under her own name. Currently, NPO 3FM is trying to halt the sharply declining listening figures since the end of 2015.

Despite numerous changes happening, the listening figures still consistently went down, and almost showed no sign of rising. The latest statistics show that NPO 3FM only has a national market share of 2.9%, therefore becoming Netherlands' second least-listened-to youth-orientated station in the market, ahead of only SLAM! (1.6%).

On 20 June 2018, Domien Verschuuren announced his departure. He stopped his breakfast show Domien, Jouw Ochtendshow and switches to the Qmusic for a drive time slot. It is possible that Domien left the station due to his "dissatisfaction and frustruation" of the, as noted above, consistently-dropping figures. It is not yet known when he leaves, however it is now confirmed that the current early evening DJ Sander Hoogendoorn will be his replacement.

On 2 August 2018, Talpa Radio director Menno Koningsberger said that NPO 'no longer worries' about 3FM's figures. He argued that a typical Dutch radio listener is 50 years old in average as of now, and that the same struggle is happening with Radio 538 since breakfast host Edwin Evers and the Saturday night mixshow "Dance Department" are starting to attract relatively older listeners.

A new schedule has released on 3 September 2018. Sander Hoogendoorn hosts the "Sanders Vriendenteam" show in the breakfast slot, and his old evening slot is now hosted by Frank van der Lende in his new "De Bende van Van der Lende" show. NPO 3FM has also officially released the reason of the controversial decision of switching all program names to DJs' first names in 2016: "to increase the brand awareness of [them]".

== Pop chart ==
Starting in 1969, Hilversum 3 hosted its own hit parade: the Hilversum 3 Top 30, following the example set in 1965 by Radio Veronica and its own Top 40. The name and compiling methods of the Hilversum 3 chart changed several times. In the early 1970s it was known as either Hilversum 3 Top 30 and (from 1971) the Daverende Dertig ("Thundering Thirty"). In June 1974 the name was changed into Nationale Hitparade, first a Top 30, later a Top 50 (1978–1987) and a Top 100 (1987–1993). In January 1993, the Nationale Hitparade was scrapped and replaced by an all new chart, the Mega Top 50, started on 7 February 1993. It is still broadcast every Saturday.

Unusually, Hilversum 3 used to have more than one pop chart between 1974 and 1992. While its official Nationale Hitparade chart – supported by most public broadcasters – was hosted by the NOS, Veronica, once it received its legal status in May 1976, broadcast its own Top 40. Also, TROS introduced its own rival chart, TROS Top 50, on 1 June 1978 (it had previously broadcast the TROS Europarade, a top 30/40 of the biggest hits in a number of European countries) which started on 27 May 1976. This European chart was discontinued on 27 June 1987.

For many years, listeners could experience three separate charts on Hilversum 3: the TROS Top 50 on Thursdays, Dutch Top 40 on Fridays and Nationale Hitparade on Wednesdays. Also on Sundays, listeners could hear the TROS Europarade.

All this changed on 7 February 1993, when the Nationale Hitparade was discontinued (the TROS Top 50 had already been scrapped on 21 November 1985), the Top 40 moved to Radio 538 and NPO 3FM started its new public chart, the Mega Top 50.

== 3FM Serious Request ==
In 2004, the station begun a charity project by the name of Serious Request in which three DJs play requested songs for money for six days and nights in a glass house. They collect this money for projects of the Red Cross. The DJs do not eat during these days. Serious Request starts every year the week before Christmas.

== 3FM Awards ==
Each year in March/April, 3FM hosts the 3FM awards, which are given to Dutch musicians. A public poll is held among listeners to determine the winners.

In 2010 3FM hosts the sixth edition of the 3FM Awards.

Nominees	Winner
Best Band
Blof, Kane, Krezip, Racoon and Di-Rect	Blof
Best Male Singer
Alain Clark, Bertolf, Boris, VanVelzen and Marco Borsato	Pascal Jakobsen
Best Female Singer
Anouk, Ilse DeLange, Jacqueline Govaert (Krezip), Nikki and Sanne Hans (Miss Montreal)	Ilse DeLange
Best Artist Pop
Alain Clark, Krezip, Ilse DeLange, Racoon and VanVelzen	Blof
Best Artist Rock
Anouk, Gem, Kane, Voicst and Within Temptation	Within Temptation
Best Artist Dance
Anouk, Gem, Kane, Voicst and Within Temptation	Tiësto
Best Artist Alternative
De Jeugd Van Tegenwoordig, Gem, Novastar, Pete Philly & Perquisite and Voicst	Novastar
Best Single
In And Out of Love (Armin Van Buuren & Sharon), Modern World (Anouk), So Incredible (Ilse DeLange), Tijdmachine (Dio feat. Sef) and Squeeze Me (Kraak & Smaak)	So Incredible (Ilse DeLange)
Best Album
Oktober (Blof), De Machine (De Jeugd Van Tegenwoordig), Incredible (Ilse DeLange), Almost Bangor (Novastar) and Before You Leave (Racoon)	Incredible (Ilse DeLange)
Best Live Act
Marco Borsato, Krezip, Kane, Anouk and Within Temptation	Within Temptation
Best Newcomer
Bertolf, Dio, Miss Montreal, Nikki Kerkhof and Sabrina Starke	Nikki Kerkhof

The artist with the most awards in 2009 is Ilse DeLange, she won three awards. She also won the Schaal van Rigter the award for the most played single on radio station 3FM, she won this award with the song "So Incredible".

== Live performances ==
Most of the DJs invite artists to perform live on air.

The band Yellow Pearl holds the all-time record of most live performances on 3FM. They did this 25 times, within four years in nine different shows. The first performance was in 2004 when they performed their single "For You And Me" in the morning show of Rob Stenders.

== Programming ==
In 2022, the team of programming produces include: AVROTROS, KRO-NCRV, EO, BNNVARA, VPRO, NTR, PowNed and ZWART. The station also broadcasts news bulletins produced by the NOS.

The current broadcast schedules (effective from 15 October 2018) are (program names only):

	Monday	Tuesday	Wednesday	Thursday	Friday	Saturday	Sunday
12 am-2 am	Joost (KRO-NCRV)				Sophie (AVROTROS)		Kevin (KRO-NCRV)
2 am-4 am	Jamie (KRO-NCRV)	Andres (KRO-NCRV)	Jamie (KRO-NCRV)	Tannaz (EO)	Rob (AVROTROS)	Yoeri (AVROTROS)	
4 am-6 am	Luc (BNNVARA)				Joost (NTR)		Luc (BNNVARA)
6 am	Sanders Vriendenteam (BNNVARA)					Lieke (AVROTROS)	
9 am	Sanders Vriendenteam (BNNVARA)					Weekend Wijnand (KRO-NCRV)	
10 am	Jorien (BNNVARA)					Weekend Wijnand (KRO-NCRV)	
12 pm	Jorien (BNNVARA)					Radio Op 'N Broodje (AVROTROS)	
1 pm	Angelique (KRO-NCRV)					Radio Op 'N Broodje (AVROTROS)	
2 pm	Angelique (KRO-NCRV)					Martijn (BNNVARA)	Martijn (BNNVARA)
4 pm	Mark + Rámon (BNNVARA)					Herman (AVROTROS)	
6 pm	De Bende van Van der Lende (BNNVARA)				Bijna Weekend Wijnand (KRO-NCRV)	Herman (AVROTROS)	
7 pm	De Bende van Van der Lende (BNNVARA)				Partij voor de Vrijdag (AVROTROS)	Vera on Track (NTR)	
9 pm	3voor12 Radio (VPRO)				Partij voor de Vrijdag (AVROTROS)	Vera on Track (NTR)	
10 pm	3voor12 Radio (VPRO)				Skaj is the Limit (BNNVARA)	Club Carter (VPRO)	Kaat tot Laat (EO)

== Former DJs ==
- Robin Albers
- Edwin Brienen
- Adam Curry
- Wessel van Diepen
- Wouter van der Goes
- Dolf Jansen
- Robert Jensen
- Bart van Leeuwen
- Jan Steeman
- Rick van Velthuysen
- Henk Westbroek
- Ruud de Wild
- Erik de Zwart

== See also ==
- List of radio stations in the Netherlands
