= Mega Top 30 =

Dutch music chart compiled by SoundAware

Mega Top 30 was a Dutch music chart compiled by SoundAware and broadcast every Saturday from 14:00 - 16:00 on NPO 3FM. It originally started on November 30, 1963, as the Tijd voor Teenagers Top 10. The chart stopped on 2 September 2022. Throughout the years, the chart has had several names and lengths:

From	To	Name	Length
30 November 1963	29 January 1966	Tijd voor Teenagers Top 10	Top 10
5 February 1966	17 May 1969	Parool Top 20	Top 20
24 May 1969	26 March 1971	Hilversum 3 Top 30	Top 30
2 April 1971	20 June 1974	Daverende Dertig	Top 30
27 June 1974	3 June 1978	Nationale Hitparade	Top 30
10 June 1978	21 February 1987	Nationale Hitparade	Top 50
28 February 1987	9 December 1989	Nationale Hitparade	Top 100
16 December 1989	30 January 1993	Nationale Top 100	Top 100
6 February 1993	21 December 1996	Mega Top 50	Top 50
28 December 1996	28 December 2002	Mega Top 100	Top 100
4 January 2003	31 August 2019	Mega Top 50	Top 50
7 September 2019	2 September 2022	Mega Top 30	Top 30

== History ==
The first broadcast in its current format was on Friday May 23, 1969. The show was presented by Joost den Draayer. Desmond Dekker & The Aces were the chart toppers at that time with "The Israelites". From December 4, 1970, the chart was compiled by the NOS. Den Draayer kept presenting the show until April 2, 1971, when Felix Meurders replaced him. From 1978 until 2005 the year end charts were based on sales.

The radio-broadcast remained on Radio 3 and since 5th. December 1985 the chart has been broadcast by the TROS. Only during the period of 1993–1995, the show was broadcast by other broadcasting organizations, including Veronica. From 2007 until November 2014 the chart was hosted by Bart Arens. His place was taken by Paul Rabbering. Barend van Deelen was the presenter from 2015 until 2017. The current presenter is Olivier Bakker.

On television, the chart was used by TopPop from 1974 until 1978 and from 1982 until 1988. In the period 2000-2006 Top of the Pops NL used the public chart.

In January 2003, Music & Media reported that the although positions one to 50 of the Mega Top 100 would remain based purely on sales, that positions 51 to 100 would reflect a combination of sales and airplay data. However, since May 2004, Music Factory, MTV and NPO 3FM airplay data has been used in the composition of the full Mega Top 50 chart and one year later, digital downloads were also included. The chart that made use of single sales figures only kept on existing though, under the name of B2B Single Top 100. Since 2012 streaming data has been included in the composition of the Mega Top 50 chart.

The chart is compiled by SoundAware. Current composition is based on:

- streaming data from Spotify
- download data
- radio airplay on Dutch radio stations: NPO Radio 1, NPO Radio 2, NPO 3FM, 100%NL, Q-music, Radio 538, Radio 10, Radio Veronica, Sky Radio and Slam FM.

The last edition of the Mega Top 30 was aired on 2 September 2022, with it having been axed due to a lack of suitability with NPO 3FM's regular format. It was replaced by De Verlanglijst (The Wishlist), a similar chart which is composed by online voting from a shortlist.

== Books ==
Year	Title	Author(s)	Description of the content	ISBN
2004	Mega Charts Jubileumeditie	Ed Hoogeveen	Jubilee edition; treats the first ten years of Mega Charts (in Dutch)	ISBN 9789021540207
2013	Mega Top 50 presenteert: 50 Jaar Hitparade	Bart Arens, Edgar Kruize, Ed Adams	The complete history of the Dutch public charts from 1963 until 2014 (in Dutch)	ISBN 9789000331000

== See also ==
- MegaCharts
- Single Top 100
- Dutch Top 40
