= SubLime FM =

Sublime
- Utrecht; Netherlands
- Broadcast area: Netherlands
- Frequencies: FM Broadcasting, no longer broadcasting on FM since 1 september 2023. 89.7 MHz (Breda); 89.7 MHz (Eindhoven); 90.7 MHz (Enschede); 90.3 MHz (Groningen); 90.4 MHz (Hoorn); 90.7 MHz (Lopik); 88.9 MHz (Maastricht); 89.8 MHz (Nijmegen); 90.5 MHz (Rotterdam); 90.5 MHz (Smilde); 90.8 MHz (Terneuzen); Digital terrestrial broadcasting Digitenne: Channel 123; Cable television UPC Netherlands: Channel 853; Ziggo: Channel 1767; IPTV; KPN: Channel 818

Programming
- Format: Jazz, Funk, Soul, R&B, Lounge and Disco (Urban AC/Easy Listening) (widely 1960s-today)

Ownership
- Owner: Mediahuis Nederland
- Sister stations: SLAM! 100% NL; Radio Veronica

History
- First air date: February 2004
- Former call signs: Arrow Jazz FM (2005–2012); Arrow 90,7 (2004–2005); Arrow Classic Jazz (2004)

Technical information
- Transmitter coordinates: 52°5′N 5°7′E

Links
- Webcast: Listen Live
- Website: sublimefm.nl

Sublime (previously Sublime FM) is a Dutch commercial radio station dedicated to jazz but which also plays soul, Latin jazz and lounge music. The station is owned by Exceed Jazz BV, a subsidiary of Mediahuis. It started as Arrow Classic Jazz 90.7 in 2004, and shortly after as Arrow Jazz FM (2005–2012).

== History ==
In February 2004 Arrow Jazz FM began test broadcasts, and started regular broadcasts in May. In the beginning Arrow Jazz FM was only broadcast on the Internet, but slowly but surely more places in the Netherlands have been able to receive the station on cable television and on various FM frequencies across most of the Netherlands.

In November 2010 Flux Media Factory BV sold Arrow Jazz FM to Exceed Jazz BV. Flux Media Factory BV remains responsible for the production and the international distribution of Arrow Jazz FM.

The station changed its name into Sublime FM on 4 November 2012, just after the radio station changed their logo and style in May 2012.

== History of logos ==
SubLime FM was created in May 2004 and has used four different logos. The first logo contains "Arrow" on a purple background and "90,7 FM" on a black background with the slogan Smooth Jazz below. In June 2005, on the same logo, a small revision was made by removing the frequency 90,7 FM and adding "Jazz FM". In May 2012, the logo of Arrow Jazz FM was changed to a background consisting of a colored skyline and "Arrow Jazz FM" written on it with the slogan "Just Good Music. In November 2012, the station's name was changed to "Sublime FM" with a new logo, jingles, and programming.

2004-2005

2005-2012

2012-2012

2012–2018

2018–present

== Slogans ==
- From 2004 till 2005: Smooth Jazz
- From 2005 till May 2012: Cool, Funky Jazz
- From May 2012 till November 2012: Just Good Music
- From November 2012: Juice Up!
- Since February 2013: Fresh, Jazzy Sounds!

== See also ==
- List of radio stations in the Netherlands
