= Dolf Jansen =

Dutch comedian

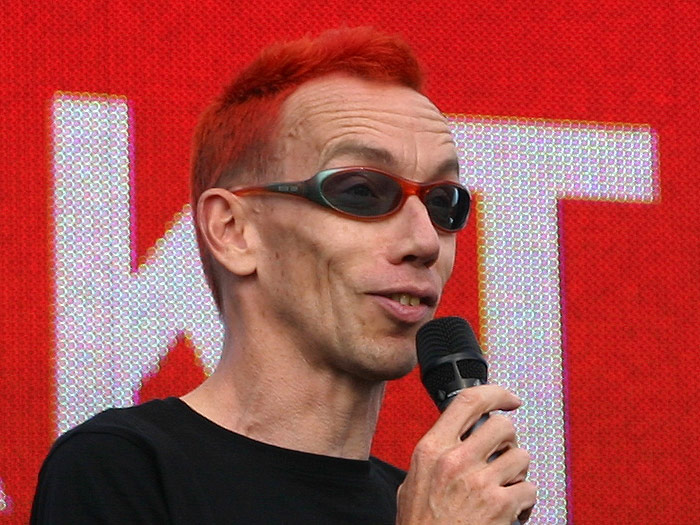
Dolf Jansen in 2008

Dolf Jansen (born 25 June 1963 in Amsterdam) is a Dutch comedian, host of the Radio 2 programme Spijkers met Koppen and an active Marathon runner. On television Jansen hosted Loods 6 (1991), Kunstbende (1992), Jansen slaat door (TROS) (1993) and Jansen op jacht (2007). He performed together with Hans Sibbel as the comedy team 'Lebbis en Jansen', but also performs as an individual comedian. He also is an ambassador of Oxfam Novib.

Dolf Jansen has an Irish mother.

== Solo programmes ==
- 2002: Dolf Solo
- 2004: Jansen Praat
- 2005: Dolfdurft
- 2007: Geen Oudejaarsvoorstelling
- 2008: Echt (Oudejaars 2008)
- 2009: Altijd Verder
- 2010: Oudejaars 2010
- 2011: Als ik het niet doe doet niemand het
- 2011: Oudejaars van de straat (In Pauw & Witteman)
- 2012: Als ik het niet doe doet niemand het (en daar zal ook wel weer een reden voor zijn*) * maar mij wordt weer eens niets verteld
