= Stadsomroep Den Haag =

Den Haag TV
- Country: Netherlands
- Broadcast area: The Hague
- Headquarters: Den Haag FM/Den Haag TV, Laan van 's-Gravenmade 4, 2495 AJ, The Hague

Programming
- Picture format: 16:9 1080i (HDTV)

Ownership
- Owner: Omroep West

Links
- Webcast: Den Haag TV; Den Haag FM Webcam
- Website: http://denhaagfm.nl/

Den Haag FM
- The Hague; Netherlands
- Frequencies: FM broadcast: 92.0 MHz: Cable Ziggo: 92.9 MHz; Cable CAIW: 99.0 MHz; Den Haag Totaal Cable Ziggo: 106.8 MHz

Programming
- Language: Dutch

Ownership
- Owner: Omroep West

History
- Former names: Stads Radio Den Haag, Stadsradio 94 Den Haag

Links
- Webcast: Den Haag FM; Radio Den Haag Totaal
- Website: http://denhaagfm.nl/

Stadsomroep Den Haag is a Dutch local radio and TV broadcasting service in The Hague region. It operates the media channels Den Haag FM, radio Den Haag Totaal, and Den Haag TV. Since 2011 Stadsomroep Den Haag collaborates with Omroep West. Its website features its broadcasts in full HD and audio twenty-four hours a day.

Den Haag TV is the local television channel from The Hague. It's based on what goes on in the city. Items about recreation, culture, news from the local neighborhood everywhere from town and a daily local news service. Also local musicians, hiphop-artists, and singer-songwriters have a stage at Den Haag TV.

Den Haag FM is the local radio station in The Hague. It mostly plays music from the 2000s and the present day. It's a fresh and modern city radio. It is also broadcast at Den Haag TV.

Den Haag Totaal Is a local cable radio only received in The Hague. It plays 24H non-stop music from the 70's till the 00's.
