= Sleutelstad FM =

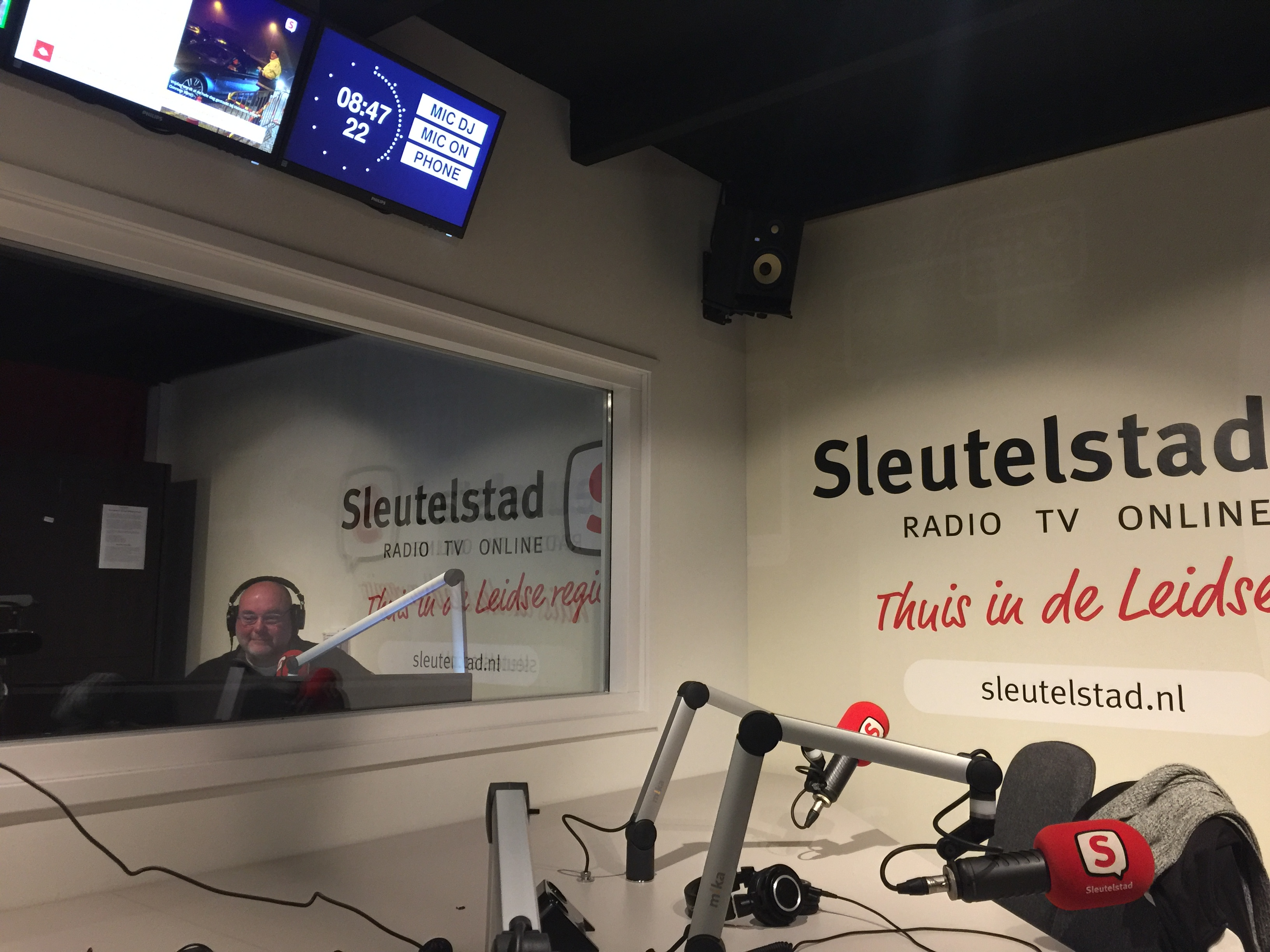

Leiden; Netherlands
- Broadcast area: Leiden
- Frequency: 99.6 FM

Programming
- Language: Dutch

Ownership
- Owner: Sleutelstad Media BV

History
- First air date: December 6, 2005

Links
- Webcast: Listen Live
- Website: http://sleutelstad.nl/

Sleutelstad FM is a local radio channel in Leiden, Netherlands. The station plays music from the '70s to present day trends. Its programming includes news and music at the local and regional stage.
