= NPO FunX =

FunX
- Rotterdam; Netherlands
- Frequencies: FM (local editions); Region: Frequency: Amsterdam: 96.1 MHz; Rotterdam: 91.8 MHz; The Hague: 98.4 MHz; Utrecht: 96.1 MHz; DVB-T Bouquet 1 (NPO mux); DAB+ VHF channel 12C (227.36 MHz); Astra 3B Satellite 11.914 GHz/H (free to air)

Programming
- Format: Urban/Rhythmic/World

Ownership
- Owner: Stichting FunX (NPO) and Stichting G4 Radio
- Sister stations: NPO Radio 1 NPO Radio 2 NPO 3FM; NPO Klassiek; NPO Radio 5 NPO Sterren NL; NPO Blend

History
- First air date: August 3, 2002

Links
- Webcast: Radioplayer; Webstream; Webcam; Playlist
- Website: funx.nl

NPO FunX (Dutch: [ˈfʏnɪks]) is a Dutch public radio station which has been on air since 3 August 2002. The station runs mainly urban music.

The station is aimed at an audience of young people between 15 and 34 years. It concentrates on such music styles as R&B, Hip hop, Latin, Reggae, Dancehall, French-African Hip Hop, Oriental, Arabpop, Farsipop, Turkpop, Banghra, Rai, Mandopop, and various crossover styles. The station aims to give "street" opinions airtime and follows the latest trends.

There are four local city editions of FunX: Amsterdam, Rotterdam, The Hague and Utrecht, and since 6 September 2005 a national edition. The local broadcasts consist of a joint framework program, some hours are split into different (local) editions. These city editions air on FM broadcast band near the mentioned cities. A national version is also available via DVB-T, DAB+, cable, satellite and the Internet but not via FM.

Via the Internet are also to listen to special editions, each with its own musical style: FunX Slow Jamz, FunX fissa, FunX Hip Hop, FunX Latin, FunX afro and FunX Arab.

== Organization ==
Stichting FunX is the principal entity on FunX since 2012. This manages the activities on behalf of the Dutch Public Broadcasting (NPO) which the station is financing since 2012 after the national government and municipalities were there largely stopped it.

FunX BV is a wholly owned subsidiary of the Stichting G4 Radio that takes care of the local activities and local advertising sales. This foundation is a partnership of local broadcasters of the four major cities: SALTO Omroep Amsterdam, Stichting Open Rotterdam, Stadsomroep Den Haag and RTV Utrecht. The terrestrial licenses of the local editions of FunX in the name of these four local public broadcasters. The national version belongs to the Dutch Public Broadcasting, Until 2006, the national edition affiliated with BNN, but since the end of 2006, the board of directors of the NOS – the largest financier of FunX – established a direct link (through the former Stichting Colorful Radio) with FunX.

== History ==
After Colorful Radio was labeled an illegal sideline in 2005 by the commissioner for the media, there was room for FunX as a national radio station. Due to a suspensive decision by State Secretary Medy van der Laan and in 2008 one for FunX positive court ruling, FunX can be broadcast nationwide on the capacity of the Stichting Colorful Radio via digital terrestrial (DVB-T and DAB), cable, internet and satellite.

== Financing ==
The station is funded by the four participating broadcasters, the board of directors of the Nederlandse Omroep Stichting (NOS) and the Ministry of Education, Culture and Science and also has income from advertising revenue. In total FunX receives around 3.8 million in grants and government funds. The board of directors of the NOS carries, as of 1 January 2009, approximately 2 million euro at (2008: 1.7 million euros). Because of the more rural and appeal at the station wanted to The Hague to end its funding from the station. Ultimately, the city council decided, under pressure from FunX BV, the subsidy nevertheless put forth and go along here over the next few years.

=== Subsidy stop ===
On 17 June 2011 it was announced that the government subsidy of FunX would expire after 2012. This is half of the station's budget. The station was saved by entering into a partnership with the Dutch Public Broadcasting (BNN, NTR and VPRO).

== FunX Music Awards ==
Since 27 April 2015, FunX has been presenting the FunX Music Awards annually. Various categories have been put aside for this in the music industry, such as for best singer, best newcomer, best album, best song, best collaboration, best producer etc. The prizes are awarded during a show where a number of relevant Dutch artists perform. In 2019 there was the first category especially for female musicians under the name Artist of the year - female, the first winner of this awards is Famke Louise.

== Logos ==
2002–2014

2014–2015

2015–2024

2024–present

== See also ==
- BBC 1xtra
- List of radio stations in the Netherlands
- WWPR-FM
