= NPO Klassiek =

Netherlands radio station

- Netherlands
- Frequencies: FM: 87.6–101.6 MHz; DAB+: 12C; CanalDigitaal: 704 (Astra 23.5°E); Digitenne: 104; KPN: 804; Ziggo: 804; Various frequencies on analogue cable

Programming
- Format: Classical music, culture

Ownership
- Owner: NPO
- Sister stations: NPO Radio 1 NPO Radio 2 NPO 3FM; NPO Radio 5 NPO FunX; NPO Sterren NL; NPO Blend

History
- First air date: 28 December 1975
- Former call signs: Hilversum 4 (1975—1985); Radio 4 (1985–2014); NPO Radio 4 (2014–2022)

Links
- Webcast: Radioplayer; Livestream; Webstream; Webcam
- Website: http://www.npoklassiek.nl

NPO Klassiek is a public-service radio channel in the Netherlands, broadcasting chiefly classical music. It is part of the Netherlands Public Broadcasting system, NPO.

== History ==
Logo used from 2011 to 2014

The channel began broadcasting on 28 December 1975 under the name Hilversum 4. Its first programme was Veronica op 4, produced by the Veronica broadcasting association (VOO), which had just entered the public system. Veronica was given a one hour slot on Sundays. VOO's first radio broadcast in the public sector had a hint of irony inherited from their offshore days, with André van Duin, continuing under the alias of Simon Somber, one of his characters, announced that the first track was classical in nature, but as a prank from the team, an excerpt of Long Tall Sally by The Beatles (the sort of music that aired on Radio Veronica) was played by accident.

The station initially broadcast from 8am to 5pm on Sundays, and from 7am to 5pm on other days of the week. Hilversum 4 changed to Radio 4 on 1 December 1985.

Logo used from 2014 to 2022

On 19 August 2014, the station's name and logo were amended to include mention of its parent broadcasting organization, NPO.

On 31 October 2022, it was announced that the stations name would change to NPO Klassiek effective 1 January 2023, a hub for all classical music of NPO with the radio at the center, but now with all media related to classical music.

== Content contributors ==
The following broadcasting associations and organisations currently provide programming on NPO Klassiek: AVROTROS, BNNVARA, EO, KRO-NCRV, MAX, NTR and VPRO.

== Broadcasting ==
Initially, the channel broadcast only during the evenings, with a segment produced by Teleac, but it now operates around the clock, providing surround sound transmissions via the internet and satellite.

== Programming ==
The emphasis during the day was once all-complete works from both well- and lesser-known tracks; however, the station now focuses more on short segments from better-known classical repertoire. In the evening (around 8-11pm), a live concert is broadcast, on Saturday evening a regular live recording of an opera concert. Since 2015, live shows can be watched in the studio via a webcam.

== See also ==
- List of radio stations in the Netherlands
