= Bart van Leeuwen =

Dutch photographer and author

- Born: 5 February 1950; Amsterdam, Netherlands
- Died: 17 June 2017 (aged 67)
- Occupations: Photographer, author
- Years active: 1967–2005

Bart van Leeuwen (5 February 1950, in Amsterdam – 17 June 2017) was a Dutch photographer and author.

== Career ==
Van Leeuwen published his first pictures in 1967, graduated from the School for Professional Photography in The Hague in 1969 and started to work as a freelance photographer in 1971. Inspired by film noir, Italian neorealism and photographers like Avedon, Brassaï, Frank, Kertész, Lartigue, Newton and Penn he developed a narrative, cinematographic style, linking facts and fiction. He published "Nabelichting", an autobiographical novel, in 2012, and "Niets is Echt", a book about photography and reality, in 2015. Due to a neuromuscular disorder he ceased the creation of new photographic works in 2005 and until his death lived with his wife and son just outside Amsterdam.

== Acclaim ==
Van Leeuwen has had much critical acclaim over the course of his career. He has received multiple awards and has often been asked to teach by art schools and universities.

Hannah Hör writes:

A fashion photographer who completely rewrote the rules of his trade, using city streets as expressive backdrops, offering an almost casual perspective on cutting-edge fashion designs, and favouring coincidence over carefully crafted poses, Bart van Leeuwen is a master of his profession. His body of work is an intoxicating journey into sensual metropolises like Naples and through fashion capitals such as New York and Paris. The Dutch artist captures the poetic stories of everyday life with cinematographic elegance, drawing inspiration from the contrast-rich style of Film Noir and from Italian neorealism.

[...]

Van Leeuwen's photographic oeuvre is characterised by chance and spontaneity. Whether shooting Andy Warhol during a workout in the factory or capturing Freddy Mercury, Jean-Michel Basquiat, and Grace Jones as they happened to stand opposite him: "I always tried to be open to coincidences, not restricting myself to a pre-defined concept, to find things I wasn’t even looking for but that were actually better than I could have imagined". Van Leeuwen’s photographs can be found in the private collections of fashion designers such as Thierry Mugler or Christian Lacroix, as well as in the Andy Warhol Museum in Pittsburgh.

== Publications ==
Van Leeuwen has worked for magazines like Avenue, Cosmopolitan, Elle, Esquire, Harpers Bazaar, i-D, Kult, Marie-Claire, Oor, Playboy, Sunday Times, Viva and Wallpaper and companies such as Agnès B, Barclays, Bilderberg, Bijenkorf, CBS, Harrods, ING, Levi's, Matinique, Philips, RCA, René Lezard, Sara Lee, Woolmark and Volvo, shooting fashion stories, advertising campaigns and portraits. Andy Warhol, Bob Geldof, Candy Dulfer, Carice van Houten, Dizzy Gillespie, Dolores Olmedo, Freddie Mercury, Giorgio Armani, Grace Jones, Herman Brood, Jean-Michel Basquiat, Jerry Hall, John Cale, Nina Hagen and Sylvia Kristel are among the celebrities he photographed. Some of Van Leeuwen's published work includes:

- Mathilde, Muse, Myth, Mystery. Lisette de Zoete, pgs. 142–145, Lectures, 2016
- Nothing is Real, Fact and Photography, Brave New Books, 2015
- Everything but Clothes, José Teunissen, Jhim Lamorée, Terra Lannoo, 2015
- APF Magazine Hong Kong, pgs. 45–56, 10/2013
- Aesthetica Magazine, Historic Lifestyles pg. 35, 10 November 2013
- Framed in Print, Janna Laeven, NRC Next, 10 October 2013
- Gup 38, 40 Years of Dutch Magazine Photography, 2013
- Pf Magazine 3, pgs. 30–40, 2013
- Fotofolio – 40 Years of Dutch Magazine Photography, Lectures, 2013
- Fashion Photography in the Netherlands, Irma v. Bommel, pgs. 73–74, 2012
- Avro's Kunstuur TV, Charlotte Ebers, Art 2 Read, 16 June 2012
- NTR Kunststof Radio, Petra Possel, 6 June 2012
- Vrij Nederland 21, Rudie Kagie, pgs. 20–26, 2012
- Vogue NL 2, Fiona Hering, pgs. 164–171, 2012
- Nabelichting, Autobiography, Brouwerij | Brainbooks, 2012
- Luxor Episodes, Jan Damen, 2009
- Avenue, Stijlvol en Werelds, Georgette Koning, NRC Handelsblad, 2006
- Avenue A-Z, Nederlands Fotomuseum, pgs. 117–122, 2006
- Tableau, Fine Arts Magazine 3, pg. 96, 2004
- F.D.Stijl, Frederique Huygen, pg. 20, 2002
- Tros 2Vandaag TV, Passie voor Pose, 11/2002
- Residence, Marieke van Gessel, pgs. 76–81, 2002
- Creative Red Book 1999/2000
- Art View, pg. 77, 1999
- Haute Culture, Mary Hessing, Gisela Prager, 1998
- Beeldspraak, Ton Hendriks, 1995
- Candy Dulfer, Joep Kock, 1994
- Eye to Eye, Henk Gerritsen, 1991
- The Decisive Image, Ingeborg Leijerzapf, 1991
- Modus, Pauline Terreehorst, 1990

== Exhibitions ==
Van Leeuwen's exhibitions include:

- 2017 ONO Arte Contemp, Warhol & Basquiat, Dalla Pop Art alla Street Art, Mantova, It
- 2015 The Gallery Club, History of Dutch Magazine Photography, Amsterdam NL
- 2015 Museum Arnhem, Everything but Clothes, Arnhem NL
- 2014 Christie's, YiP Art, Amsterdam NL
- 2013 Foam, Framed in Print, Amsterdam NL
- 2010 DFF Gallery, Zoom, Eyes on Dutch Fashion, The Hague NL
- 2009 BlowUp Gallery, Uppercuts, Amsterdam NL
- 2008 BlowUp Gallery, Dutch Nudes, Amsterdam NL
- 2008 BlowUp Gallery, Bart van Leeuwen – 40 Years of Fashion, Amsterdam NL
- 2007 Wouter van Leeuwen Gallery, Andy Warhol, Amsterdam NL
- 2006 Nederlands Fotomuseum, Avenue A – Z, Rotterdam NL
- 2004 Downtown Gallery, BlowUp Photographers, Amsterdam NL
- 2004 BlowUp Gallery, Bart van Leeuwen, Amsterdam NL
- 2003 Kunsthal, Playboy Photography, Rotterdam NL
- 2003 BlowUp Gallery, 11 Photographers, Amsterdam NL
- 2003 Naarden Photo, 50 Years Nieuwe Revu, Naarden NL
- 2003 Naarden Photo, Style of Life, Naarden NL
- 2003 Breda Photo, Breda NL
- 2003 Sanoma, Style of Life, Hoofddorp NL
- 2003 Christies, Aids Fund, Amsterdam NL
- 2002 VNU, 30 x 30, 30 Years Viva, Amsterdam NL
- 2002 Downtown Gallery, Pim Thomassen, Amsterdam NL
- 2002 Scheringa Museum, 50 Years of Fashion, Spanbroek NL
- 2002 Reflections, Urban Perceptions, Amsterdam NL
- 2000 Historic Museum, Young, Rotterdam NL
- 2000 Museum of Drenthe, Young, Assen NL
- 1999 Kring, War Child, Amsterdam NL
- 1999 Scheringa Museum, Fong Leng 'Diva', Spanbroek NL
- 1999 Lumiere, SVFN, Durgerdam NL
- 1998 PanL, Amsterdam NL
- 1998 Jablonka Gallery, Andy Warhol, Köln DE
- 1998 Westergasfabriek, PanL, Amsterdam NL
- 1998 Bijenkorf, Doors to India, Amsterdam NL
- 1995 Naarden Photo, Ego Document, Naarden NL
- 1995 Dejeuner sur l’Herbe, Paris FR
- 1994 European Photography, Yokohama JP
- 1993 Naarden Photo, Naarden NL
- 1992 St. Lucas Institute, Bruxelles BE
- 1992 Kleurgamma, Amsterdam NL
- 1991 Naarden Photo, Naarden NL
- 1990 Dunhill Dutch Photography, Amstelveen NL
- 1989 Dunhill Dutch Photography, Arnhem NL
- 1989 Sonesta Gallery, Avenue, Amsterdam NL
- 1989 Dunhill Dutch Photography, Assen NL
- 1989 Naarden Photo, Naarden NL
- 1989 Focus Gallery, Nudes, Amsterdam NL
- 1988 Dunhill Dutch Photography, Utrecht NL
- 1988 Dunhill Dutch Photography, St. Petersburg RU
- 1988 Dunhill Dutch Photography, Moscow RU
- 1988 Modam, Amsterdam NL
- 1987 Month of Photography, Athens GR
- 1987 Dunhill Dutch Photography, Amsterdam NL
- 1987 Dunhill Dutch Photography, Amstelveen NL
- 1987 Institut Néerlandais, Le Vent du Nord, Paris FR
- 1986 Dunhill Dutch Photography, Lelystad NL
- 1985 Canon Gallery, 20 Years Avenue, Amsterdam NL
- 1985 Aemstelle, Dunhill Dutch Photography, Amstelveen NL
- 1984 Kodak Gallery, Odijk NL
- 1984 KLM Gallery, Tokio JP
- 1983 Mazzo, Amsterdam NL
- 1982 KLM Gallery, New York US
- 1975 Gallery Fiolet, Amsterdam NL
