= NPO Radio 5 =

- Netherlands
- Frequencies: DVB-T, DAB+, Satellite and Cable

Programming
- Format: Oldie-based AC

Ownership
- Owner: NPO
- Sister stations: NPO Radio 1 NPO Radio 2 NPO 3FM; NPO Klassiek; NPO FunX; NPO Sterren NL; NPO Blend

History
- First air date: 2 October 1983 (as Hilversum 5)
- Former call signs: Hilversum 5
- Former names: Hilversum 5 (1983–1985); Radio 5 (1985–2001, 2006–2014); 747 AM (2001–2005); Radio 747 (2005–2006); NPO Radio 5 Nostalgia (2014–2016)
- Former frequencies: 747 kHz

Links
- Webcast: Radioplayer
- Website: www.radio5.nl

NPO Radio 5 is a Dutch public-service network radio station operated by NPO. Its main format is Oldies (both English and Dutch titles) from the 1950s and beyond, with a much stronger emphasis from the 1960s to 1980s. Very rarely, songs from the late-1940s may air at times. The service targets 55-year-olds and older, in contrast to that of NPO Radio 2 (35–55) and NPO 3FM (15–35). Every year towards the end of November, NPO Radio 5 broadcasts "The Evergreen Top 1000".

== History ==
Radio 5 logo used until 2014.

NPO Radio 5 was launched on 2 October 1983 under the name of Hilversum 5, which featured programming for minority groups. The station broadcast as a 40-minute opt-out on the AM frequency of Hiversum 1 from 7pm to 7:40pm. The programmes were news bulletins in foreign languages produced by NOS in collaboration with RNW, and were carried out in Arabic (7:02pm), Berber (7:10pm), Turkish (7:20pm) and Spanish (7:30pm).

On 1 December 1985 the network changed its name to "Radio 5". This was altered yet again on 1 April 2001, when Radio 5 became "Radio 747" to reflect the change of frequency from 1008 kHz to 747 kHz. More recently, on 4 September 2006, the name was changed back to "Radio 5". Although the 747 kHz medium wave transmissions were appreciated by motorists and enabled the channel to be heard across much of Europe at night, the domestic audience is increasingly reached via cable or internet.

Because of the increase of its listeners, it is considered to make the easy-listening programming, "Radio 5 Nostalgia" available 24-hours a day. From September 2011, Radio 5 Nostalgia became available 24-hours a day, known as Max Nostalgia, but only at certain times on 747. Not from 1900hrs Friday to 2359hrs Sunday. Radio 5 on 747 broadcasts separate programs on that frequency, mainly specialized programs.

On 747 Medium Wave, Radio 5 broadcasts music from Midnight to 0600 from Monday to Friday, when the mix of music and talk programs resumes.

Logo used from 2014 to 2016

In August 2014, the name of the station was changed to "NPO Radio 5", incorporating the public broadcaster; "NPO" name and logo.

On 7 June 2013 it was reported that NPO would possible be closing its MW-transmitters on 1 September 2015, effecting a savings of 1,3 million Euros and 3 million kilowatt-hours as a year. It was finally done at midnight. Since then the only ways to receive the station are the cable, DVB T, DAB+, satellite and internet.

On 1 January 2016 the 'Nostalgia' part of NPO Radio 5 was completely dropped. Since then this word is no longer been used on the program schedule or on the air.

== Transmitter fire and break in transmission ==
On 15 July 2011, as a result of a fire and collapse of the antenna at the FM and TV tower in Hoogersmilde, large part of the Netherlands were left without terrestrial FM radio and TV. As a stopgap Radio 5's 747 kHz AM frequency had temporarily been assigned to Radio 1 to make a news, current affairs and sports radio program available to those in the affected area. However, by December 2012 the mast had been rebuilt and restored to full operation.

== Programmes ==
- Arbeidsvitaminen (AVROTROS)
- BertOp5 (KRO-NCRV)
- De Avondstart (Omroep MAX)
- Goeiedag Haandrikman! (Omroep MAX)
- Lunch Lekker met Daniel Dekker (Omroep MAX)
- Muzieknacht (KRO-NCRV)
- Open Huis (EO)
- Magical Mystery Tour (KRO-NCRV)
- De Avond van 5 (EO)
- De Weekendborrel (AVROTROS)
- Adres Onbekend (KRO-NCRV)
- Andermans Veren (AVROTROS)
- De Muzikale Fruitmand (EO)
- De Sandwich (AVROTROS)
- FM op 5 (BNNVARA)
- Theater van het Sentiment (KRO-NCRV)
- Angela (Omroep MAX)
- Wekker-Wakker-Weekend! (Omroep MAX)
- Volgspot (KRO-NCRV)
- Groot Nieuws (EO)

== See also ==
- List of radio stations in the Netherlands
