= NPO Radio 1 =

- Netherlands
- Frequencies: FM: 91.8–105.3 MHz; DAB+: 12C; CanalDigitaal: 701 (Astra 23.5°E); Digitenne: 101; KPN: 801; Ziggo: 801; Various frequencies on analogue cable

Programming
- Format: News/Talk/Sports/Variety
- Subchannels: NPO Nieuws & Evementen

Ownership
- Owner: NPO
- Sister stations: NPO Radio 2 NPO 3FM; NPO Klassiek; NPO Radio 5 NPO FunX; NPO Sterren NL; NPO Blend

History
- First air date: 1947; 79 years ago (as Hilversum 2)

Links
- Webcast: Radioplayer; Webstream; Webcam; Playlist
- Website: www.radio1.nl

Radio 1 logo used until 2014.

NPO Radio 1 is a public-service radio channel in the Netherlands, and is part of the Netherlands Public Broadcasting, NPO. It features mostly news, talk, and sport programming with a variety of music (from classic hits to oldies to adult contemporary to ethnic music).

== History ==
Its history dates back to 1924, when the first omroeps started sharing time on two longwave transmitters. In 1930, these stations started broadcasting on medium wave. Shortly before World War II, there were already two radio stations out of Hilversum, which were later captured by the Germans. With the end of occupation, a new station operating out of Lopik started, while Radio Nederland reclaimed its former frequencies in January 1946, during the transitional government.

The channel originated in its current form in 1947 as "Hilversum 2", and transmitted using its original name until 1 December 1985, when the name was changed to "Radio 1", and remained so until becoming "NPO Radio 1" in 2014.

In June 2003, the AM frequencies were given to 747 AM, which were vacated in 2015.

== Content contributors ==
As of 2022, the following broadcasting organizations participate in the production of NPO Radio 1's programming:

- AVROTROS
- BNNVARA
- EO
- Human
- KRO-NCRV
- MAX
- NOS
- NTR
- ON
- PowNed
- VPRO
- WNL
- ZWART

== See also ==
- List of radio stations in the Netherlands
