= NPO Radio 2 =

- Netherlands

Programming
- Format: Variety (Hot AC, Rhythmic, Oldies, CHR, Mainstream Rock) (widely 1960s-today)

Ownership
- Owner: NPO
- Sister stations: NPO Radio 1; NPO 3FM; NPO Klassiek; NPO Radio 5; NPO FunX; NPO Sterren NL; NPO Blend

History
- First air date: 1947; 79 years ago (as Hilversum 1)

Links
- Webcast: Listen Live; Webcam; Playlist
- Website: www.radio2.nl

Radio 2 logo used until 2014.

NPO Radio 2 is a public-service radio station from the Netherlands, broadcasting in an adult hits format, focusing on music from the 1980s to the 2010s and current hits, though 1960s and 1970s hits may also air. It is part of the Netherlands Public Broadcasting system, NPO. It can be compared with the BBC radio station of the same name.

Since the late 2010's, NPO Radio 2 has been one of the market share leaders among Dutch radio stations. During the first years of the 2020s, it competed against commercial station QMusic for the top spot. The station's annual top 2000 event regularly leads to a large market share for the station during December.

== History ==
The origins of the station go back to "Hilversum 1", launched in 1947. The name change to "Radio 2" took place on 1 December 1985. On 19 August 2014, the name was changed to "NPO Radio 2".

== Target audience and content ==
The primary target adult audience comprises listeners aged between 35 and 55, while NPO 3FM is aimed at listeners aged 15–34. The station plays a wide variety of songs from the 1980s to 1990s, though 1960s and 1970s songs may also be incorporated. Current hits air occasionally and are based upon NPO 3FM's Mega Top 30 chart.

NPO Radio 2 is also known for its annual NPO Radio 2 Top 2000 presentation, first broadcast as a one-off event in 1999. Since then, it has turned into an annual event, consisting of a list of the 2000 best songs of all times as voted by the general public, broadcast continuously between Christmas Day and midnight on New Year's Eve.

== Content contributors ==
As of 2020, the following broadcasting organizations participate in the production of NPO Radio 2's programming:

- BNNVARA
- AVROTROS
- KRO-NCRV
- EO
- NOS
- WNL
- PowNed

== Current DJs ==
- Leo Blokhuis (BNNVARA)
- Wouter van der Goes (KRO-NCRV)
- Jan-Willem Roodbeen (BNNVARA)
- Jeroen Kijk in de Vegte (BNNVARA)
- Lisette Wellens (WNL)
- Dolf Jansen (BNNVARA)
- Felix Meurders (BNNVARA)
- Ruud de Wild (KRO-NCRV)
- Bart Arens (AVRTROS)
- Corné Klijn (AVROTROS)
- Frank van 't Hof (BNNVARA)
- Annemieke Schollaardt (AVROTROS)
- Emmely de Wilt (KRO-NCRV)
- Jeroen van Inkel (BNNVARA)
- Carolien Borgers (WNL)
- Maaike Timmerman (WNL)
- Welmoed Sijtsma (WNL)
- Martine ten Klooster (WNL)
- Eddy Keur (Powned)
- Nikki Herr (Powned)
- One'sy Muller (AVROTROS)
- Rick van Velthuysen (Powned)
- Paul Rabbering (AVRTROS)
- Henk van Steeg (EO)
- Gijs Staverman (KRO-NCRV)
- Stefan Stasse (KRO-NCRV)
- Shay Kreuger (BNNVARA)
- Thomas Hekker (BNNVARA)

== Slogans ==
- De warmste zender van Nederland (The warmest channel in the Netherlands) (1992–1995)
- Je voelt je thuis (You're feeling at home) (1995–2001, this slogan is now used by NPO Radio 5)
- Je hoort nog eens wat (You hear something again) (2001–2008)
- Radio 2 is overal (Radio 2 is everywhere) (2008–2011)
- De muziek zegt alles (The music says everything) (2011–2013)
- Come Together (2013–2015)
- NPO Radio 2 is AAN (NPO Radio 2 is ON) (5 October 2015 – 30 October 2018)
- Er is maar één NPO Radio 2 (There is only ONE NPO Radio 2) (1 November 2018 – present)

== See also ==
- List of radio stations in the Netherlands
