= Talpa Radio =

Dutch radio company

Talpa Audio
- Formerly: Talpa Radio (2017-2026)
- Industry: Radio
- Predecessor: 538 Group; Sky Radio Group
- Founded: 1 January 2012; 14 years ago
- Founder: John de Mol, Jr.
- Headquarters: Hilversum, Netherlands
- Products: Radio and television
- Owner: John de Mol Jr.
- Parent: Talpa Network
- Website: www.talpanetwork.com

Talpa Audio (formerly 538 Group, Sky Radio Group and Talpa Radio) is a radio company of Talpa Network, in which various radio and television activities are housed.

== History ==
The company started in 2002 when John de Mol Jr. bought Noordzee FM from Strengholt and SBS Radio, the radio station where he started his media career as a 16 year old. He placed the radio station in the company Talpa Radio, Talpa Radio would acquire Radio 10 in 2003. In 2005 De Mol wanted to acquire the market leader Radio 538, but wasn't allowed due to a law in the Netherlands that prevented one party to have multiple unconditional frequency packages in possession. Therefore Noordzee FM was sold to De Persgroep in order to acquire Radio 538.

RTL Nederland and John de Mol struck a deal in 2017 in which RTL would acquire the television channel Tien and Radio 538, John de Mol would acquire a 26% stake in RTL. Radio 10 was initially excluded from the deal, but eventually acquired in 2010 from Talpa Radio and SLAM!FM from Lex Harding in 2011 by the consortium. Due to John de Mol's partial acquisition of SBS Broadcasting B.V. in 2011 the Netherlands Authority for Consumers and Markets forced him to sell his stake in RTL Nederland. In this deal - which came into effect in 2012 - RTL would buy back the shares of De Mol and De Mol would acquire the radio stations from RTL and formed the 538 Group, which became a subsidiary of John de Mol's Talpa Holding. Talpa Holding sold radio station Radio 10 to RadioCorp in 2013, RadioCorp already owned 100% NL. With this deal Talpa Holding would acquire a 25% stake in RadioCorp. This stake would rise to 100% in 2016 when Talpa Holding acquired the remaining 75%, so Talpa would fully own Radio 538, SLAM!FM, Radio 10 and 100% NL. The stations SLAM!FM and 100% FM however were immediately sold to Karl Habsburg, one of the original owners of RadioCorp. De Mol sold these stations so he could form a joint-venture with Telegraaf Media Group's Sky Radio Group in 2016 of which Talpa would own 77%, the joint venture included the stations Radio Veronica, Radio 10, Sky Radio and Radio 538 and advertisement agency One Media Sales.

Following the rest of 2016 and 2017 De Mol wanted to acquire the parent company of his joint-venture partner Telegraaf Media Group for his newly formed Talpa Network, a bidding war between Talpa and Mediahuis erupted. De Mol started buying up stock during this process and reached 29.16% of the shares, gave a higher bid for the rest of the shares, but was turned down when the other shareholders chose a deal with Mediahuis. In August 2017 De Mol stopped his acquisition attempt, but kept his share of Telegraaf Media Group. This construction lasted until December of 2017 when Mediahuis acquired the remaining shares and De Mol acquired the 538 Group-Sky Radio Group joint-venture, which he renamed Talpa Radio.

=== Proposed merger with RTL Nederland ===
After the complete acquisition of SBS Broadcasting in 2017, John de Mol sought a partnership with RTL Nederland. In his opinion there wasn’t enough space in the Dutch market for two major networks, RTL shut down his offer. However in June 2021 RTL Nederland and Talpa Network announced plans for a merger, pending approval by the European Commission and the Netherlands Authority for Consumers and Markets. In the new conglomerate, RTL Nederland is to hold 70% of the shares and Talpa Holding 30%. Talpa Entertainment Productions and Talpa Concepts won't be a part of the merger. Both parties reasoned that a merger was the only solution to an ever growing presence of foreign media parties, giving space to a single commercial Dutch media company that's capable of producing specifically for the Dutch market. Critics however claimed that the failing of Talpa Network is the reason behind the merger. In January 2022 the Netherlands Authority for Consumers and Markets stated that it could not approve the merger as of yet and that further investigation to the consequences of price, quality and innovation is necessary.

== Assets ==
=== Ether ===
- Radio 538, current hit music, rock and dance
- Radio 10, music from the 1960s to 1990s
- Sky Radio, Feel-good pop music from the 1980s to today
- Radio Noordzee, 200% Dutch language by Music oldies classics and nederpop from the 1970s to today

=== Television channel ===
- TV 538

=== Internet stations ===
- 538 Non Stop
- 538 Rewind
- 538 Die Verrückte
- 538 Ibiza
- 538 Dance Department
- 538 Top 50
- 538 Party
- 538 Hitzone
- 538 Zomer
- Radio 10 60s & 70s Hits
- Radio 10 80s Hits
- Radio 10 90s Hits
- Radio 10 Love Songs
- Radio 10 Non-Stop
- Radio 10 Top 4000
- Radio 10 Disco Classics
- Sky Radio LoveSongs
- Sky Radio 80's Hits
- Sky Radio 90's Hits
- Sky Radio Christmas
- Sky Radio Non-Stop@Work
- Sky Radio Non-Stop Hits
- Sky Radio Lounge
- Sky Radio Smooth Hits

== Former assets ==
- Radio 10 Gold (2012–2013)
- SLAM! and SLAM!TV (2012–2016)
- Radio Veronica (Talpa Radio) (2012–2023)

== Gallery ==
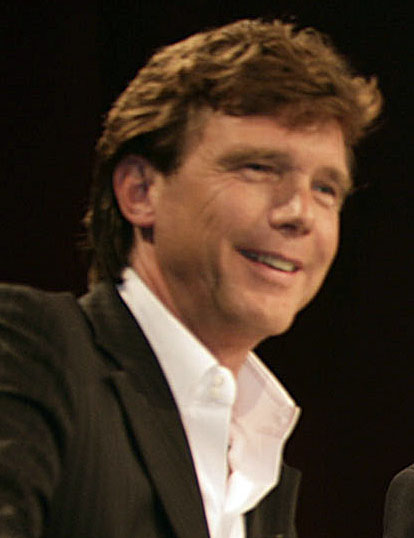
John de Mol Jr. Owner and founder of Talpa Radio

Radio 538

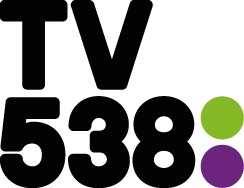
TV 538

Radio 10

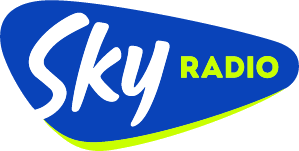
Sky Radio
