= Hit Radio =

Hit Radio, Hitradio or HitRadio may refer to:

- Contemporary hit radio
- DXKR-FM in Davao City, Philippines (now Retro 95.5)
- Hit Radio (Morocco), a Moroccan radio station specialized in mainstream pop music
- HitRadio Veronica (Sky Radio), a Dutch radio station broadcasting over the internet
- HitRadio Veronica, a former Dutch radio station
- Hitradio Ö3, an Austrian radio station
