= Radio 10 (Netherlands) =

- Hilversum; Netherlands
- Frequencies: FM: Cell Tower: Frequency: Alkmaar: 88.1 MHz; Amsterdam: 103.6 MHz; Arnhem: 104.1 MHz; Breskens: 93.3 MHz; Den Bosch: 87.9 MHz; Emmen: 103.8 MHz; Enschede: 103.9 MHz; Goes: 103.8 MHz; Haarlem: 104.0 MHz; Hilversum: 88.1 MHz; Lelystad: 87.7 MHz; Maastricht: 91.1 MHz; Rotterdam: 103.8 MHz; Smilde: 87.6 MHz; Tjerkgaast: 103.8 MHz; Utrecht: 87.8 MHz; Westdorpe: 93.0 MHz; AM: 828 kHz (Rotterdam); DVB-T Bouquet 2 (coded, listen with Digitenne subscription); DAB+ VHF channel 11C (220.352 MHz); Satellite: Astra 3B (23.5°O) 11.915 GHz/H

Programming
- Language: Dutch
- Format: Oldies/Adult Contemporary (widely 1960s-today)

Ownership
- Owner: Talpa Audio; Subsidiary of Talpa Network
- Sister stations: Sky Radio; Radio 538; Radio Noordzee

History
- First air date: April 4, 1988
- Former names: Radio 10 (1988–1990); Radio 10 Gold (1990–1999); Radio 10FM (1999–2003); Radio 10 Gold (2003–2013)

Links
- Webcast: Radio 10; Radio 10 Non-Stop; Top 4000; 60's & 70's Hits; 80's Hits; 90's Hits; Love Songs; Disco Classics
- Website: radio10.nl

Radio 10 (formerly : Radio 10 Gold and Radio 10 FM) is a Dutch commercial radio station that mostly focuses on songs from the 1970s to 2000s, with a moderate amount of mid-1960s' and 2010s' hits. It is one of the oldest, still remaining, commercial radio stations of the Netherlands.

== History ==
=== Radio 10 1988-1990 ===
On 4 April 1988, the station started broadcasting under the same name Radio 10. Radio 10 was an initiative of former VARA DJ Jeroen Soer. Commercial radio in the Netherlands was still not allowed, but they bypassed that with the so-called U-turn construction, using the possibility that commercial stations from abroad were allowed on the Dutch cable and Radio 10 passed the Amsterdam-made programs via satellite to Italy. Radio 10 was officially an Italian station of the company Rete Zero, with an FM frequency (105 FM) in Milan. This was allowed under the law, applying to satellite and cable broadcasts. Via an uplink station in Belgium by the subscriber television channel FilmNet the signal was sent to the Dutch cable networks. With this construction, there were some Italian jingles heard on the station. Disc jockeys from the very beginning have included Ferry Maat, Adam Curry, Daniël Dekker, Peter Rijsenbrij, Jeroen Soer and Roderick Veelo.

=== Radio 10 Gold rebranding, takeover by Arcade ===
On 15 August 1990 the station was taken over by the Arcade Group and the name was changed to Radio 10 Gold. The main theme of the new station was "oldies", which formerly Radio 10 had success with on Sundays. Dutch commercial radio was now permitted and Radio 10 transmitted to the north of the Netherlands through a so-called "residual frequency". These are frequencies that were not, or not yet, in use by public broadcasting. In 1994 Gold Radio 10 MW was assigned the 675 kHz. frequency. The Arcade group expanded its activities in this period with the stations Concert Radio (classical) and Power FM (youth station).

During the 90s Radio 10 Gold broadcast on 675 kHz medium wave from a high powered transmitter. It could be heard in many places in the UK and the rest of Europe, particularly at night. However it had to give up the frequency to Arrow Classic Rock, which only used that frequency for a short while. Radio 10 Gold then broadcast on 1395 kHz but not for long. They then used 1008 kHz, again only for a short while, before getting the frequency of 828 kHz. This was not as powerful as 675 or 1008 kHz.

=== Broadcasting on FM 103; Name change into Radio 10 FM and Talpa ===
In 1998 publisher took Wegener's entertainment company Arcade over, which belonged Radio 10 Gold. On January 1, 1999, received a Gold Radio 10 FM frequency -the 103 MHz and later that year the name was changed to Radio 10 FM. Within the program were later hits a more prominent place than before. Partly for this reason that the slogan used to date "De grootste hits aller tijden" (English: The greatest hits of all time). The other two stations of Arcade were divested.

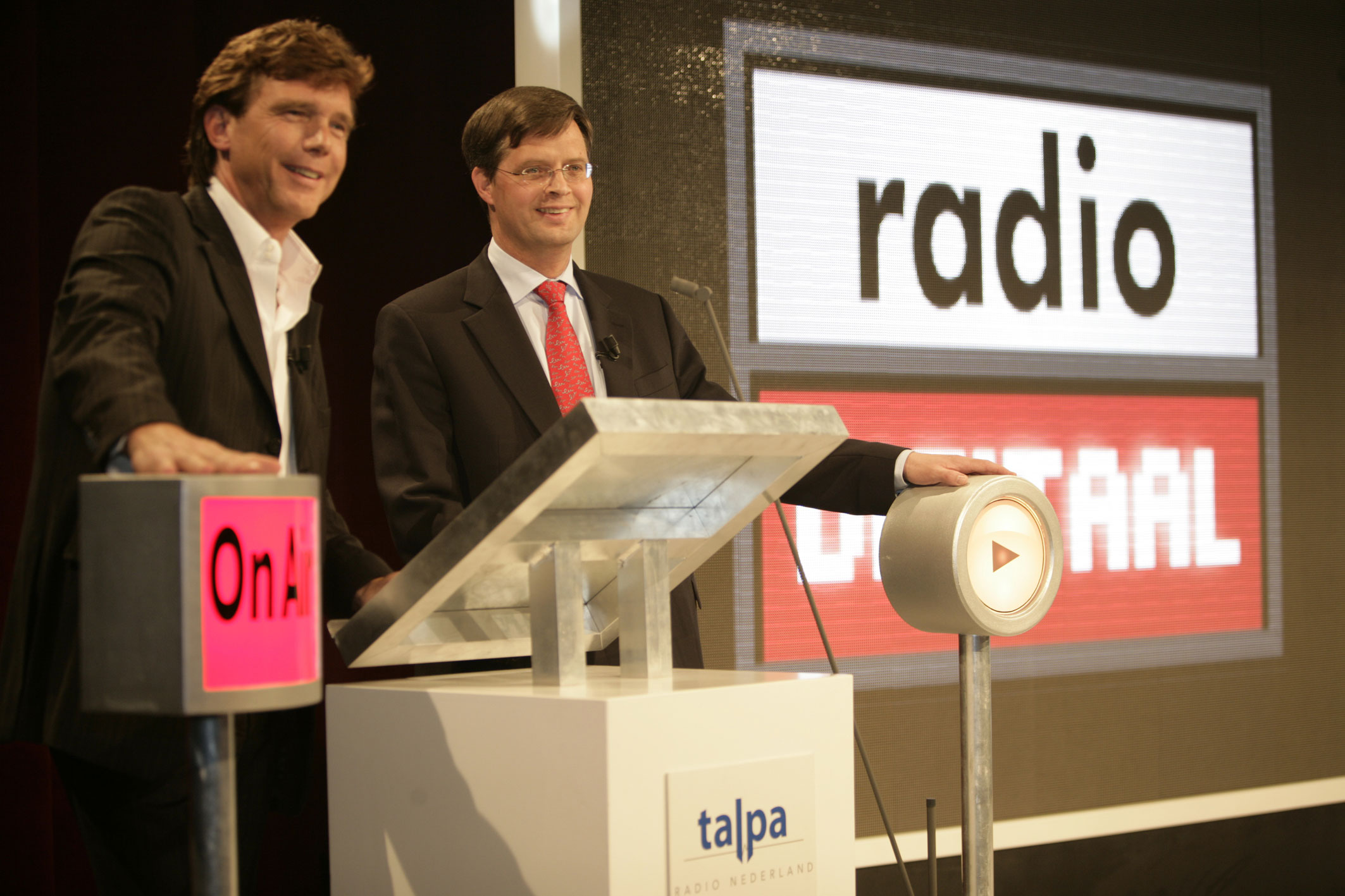
De Mol with Prime Minister Balkenende.

In February 2003 Talpa Radio International brought an enterprise of John de Mol, Radio 10 FM. Some sources claim that already Talpa's intention was to change the name back, but there is no further support available. Among the innovations that went through the station, included the return of Ferry Maat and strengthening by Bart van Leeuwen. A revised program and a new logo seen on May 5 that year was born. The greatest challenge facing the organization has faced that period, was to maintain the FM frequency. FM means a greater range of listeners than AM (medium wave) and thus higher advertising revenues. To no avail: just a few weeks after the start of the innovations Talpa lost "103 FM" (aka lot A3) on Sky Radio during the auction of terrestrial frequencies to it on June 1 started using for "Radio 103" . With the loss of the FM Radio frequency was 10 acute financial problems. Initially there was talk of Sky Radio transmitter and employees of Talpa over would take, but the merger fell through.

=== Return to Gold, AM frequencies and RTL ===
After the disappearance on the FM frequencies and the failed deal with Sky Radio Ltd., Talpa had substantial cut in the workforce and Radio 10 was forced to move into the studios of sister station Noordzee FM. Exactly a month after the loss of 103 FM could Talpa Radio 10 ("gold" instead of "FM") hire an AM frequency of the former owner. Radio 10 Gold would use this wavelength until 1 August 2004.
In June 2004 Talpa Radio knew license for AM 1008 kHz, 298 m from Radio London to take over and to receive from the end of July 2004 was Radio 10 Gold in the Netherlands and abroad at this wavelength. Additionally sent Radio 10 Gold via cable and now also via the internet and ASTRA (satellite).

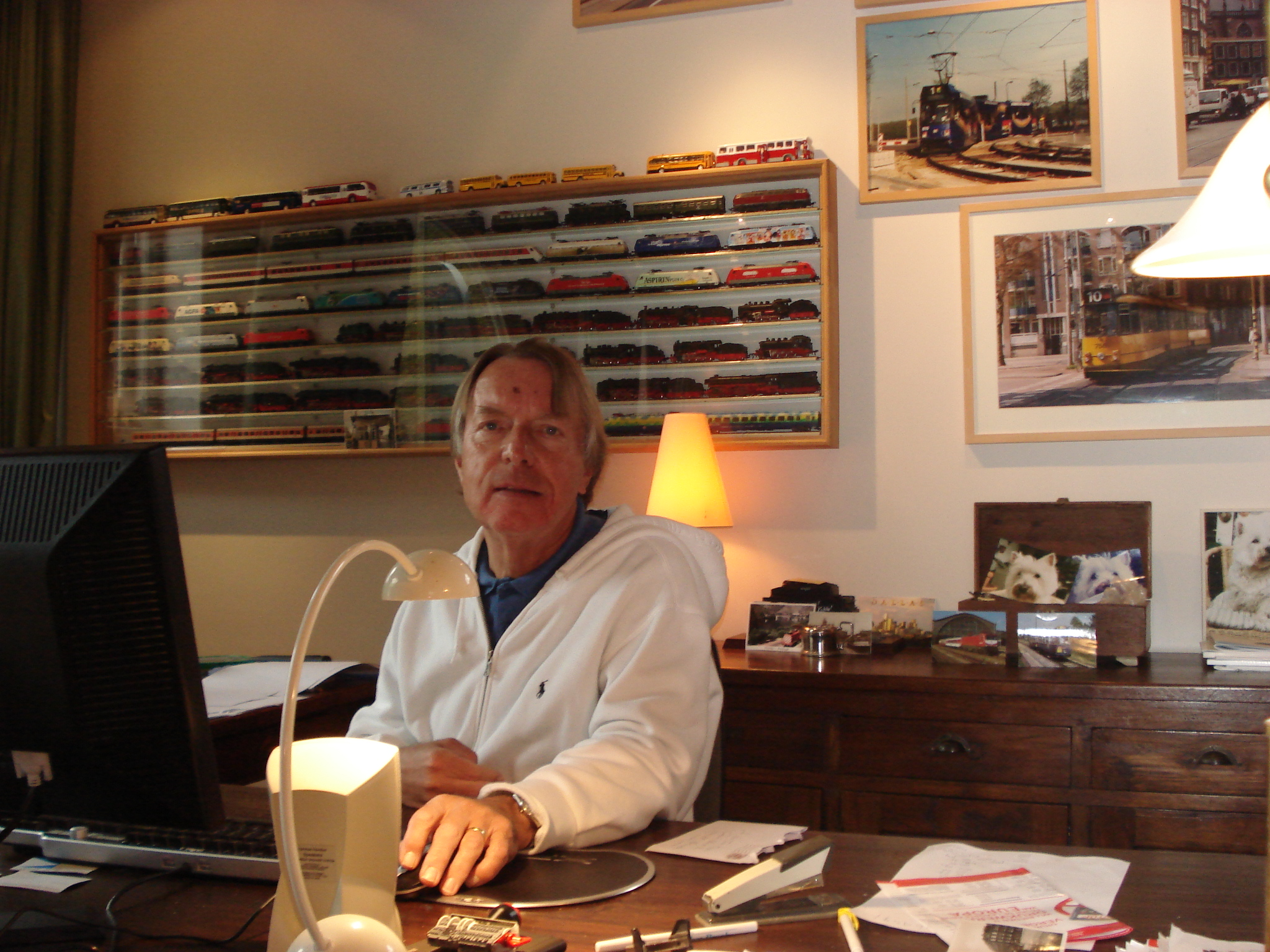
Tom Mulder in 2009.

In December 2005 Radio 10 Gold aired for the first time the Top 4000 on the occasion of the 40th anniversary of the Dutch Top 40 and possibly as a result of the success of the Top 2000 Radio 2. The list has since a permanent place gotten into programming in December. The station was in 2005 the Marconi Award for best radio station because, despite the lack of an FM frequency has ever large numbers of listeners are able to bind.
In 2006 and 2007 included the following DJs connected to the station: Jos van Heerden, Peter Holland, Peter Rijsenbrij and Thorvald de Geus. In 2005 also was Albert Verlinde attracted to a show section. The station lost in this period Dave Donkervoort to 100% NL and weatherman Jan Visser in cuts, while Tom Mulder had to thank for health reasons.

Not long after the departure of the weatherman several employees had left the company, Talpa there on 5 March 2007 announced to have to cut back considerably. A combination of high costs for the use of the frequency and disappointing advertising revenues brought the mother company to these procedures. Again, the transmitter had to switch to more recent music, hoping to attract more advertisers, but also make room for hours of non-stop music to reduce costs. In mid-2007 Talpa sold a sister station of Radio 10 (538) to RTL Nederland and they even decided to waive the AM frequency, by selling it to GrootNieuwsMedia BV. At that time the station was only listen through cable, Internet, satellite and DVB-T (coded only to subscribers of KPN's Digitenne), although Talpa also experimented briefly with FMeXtra, a technique that uses the remaining capacity on the FM band.

On 5 January 2010 it was announced that Radio 10 Gold had been sold to RTL Nederland, which planned her one of the vacant FM frequencies of Arrow Classic Rock assign. In mid-October of that year, however, opted for an AM frequency: 828 kHz. The station had been owned, since 2003, by Talpa Radio. John de Mol is also a shareholder of RTL Nederland. RTL also drew up future plans for Radio 10 Gold to use one of the vacant FM frequencies of Arrow Classic Rock but the Dutch authorities did not allow Radio 10 Gold to do this and gave the station permission to broadcast on AM 828 kHz instead. This replaced sister stations Radio 538 and SLAM!FM who now broadcasts on new frequencies. From 1 January 2012, John de Mol was obliged to say goodbye to the RTL Group withdrawal from the merger, but the wavelength if they continue to use. This was in connection with the termination of the collaboration between John de Mol and RTL due to the acquisition of SBS in 2011.

=== Radio 10, the return on FM ===
On 2 August 2013, Radio 10 Gold returned on the FM band nationally as Radio 10 after a deal between the Talpa and Radiocorp was made. RadioCorp, the company behind radio station 100% NL, got the airwave frequency package A7 plot allotted. On this plot sent to 11 March 2009 Arrow Classic Rock out. Radio 10 Gold was among the 538 Group, which is owned by Talpa Media. Because the 538 Group already has the maximum number of radio frequencies in use, the station was sold to RadioCorp, and broadcast it back to FM. The agreement Talpa acquired a minority stake in RadioCorp. The station has stayed with the Oldies format and the same jingles (without the Gold in the jingles), Radio 10 Gold (538 Group) temporarily continued its own programming and broadcasting on 828 kHz till 22 September 2013. On FM frequencies was in the meantime to hear all non-stop version of Radio 10.

Because negotiations were still ongoing at all Radio 10 Gold remained until 23 September 2013 broadcast on 828 AM. On FM frequencies was in the meantime to hear all non-stop version of Radio 10.

Due to the cooperation between Talpa (which consist of Radio 538 and SLAM! at that time) and the Telegraaf Media Groep (which consist of Sky Radio and Radio Veronica), which was announced in January 2016 to start a new joint venture between the radio stations, it became known in May 2016 that Talpa has fully owned RadioCorp BV (100% NL and Radio 10) and in turn added Radio 10 to the 538 Group, then SLAM! and 100% NL were sold to the Austrian entrepreneur Karl von Habsburg. In January 2017, the 538 Group was rebranded to Talpa Radio. For the period May–July 2018 the station has a market share around 8% at all ages.

== Racism critique ==
In corona times Dutch artist Toon has presented a satirical Carnaval song named 'Voorkomen is beter dan Chinezen' (Prevention is better than Chinese people) on national radio channel Radio 10. Which includes lyrics such as "We don't need the virus in our country, it is all caused by these stinking Chinese people" and "It will be in the fried rice soon. Don't eat Chinese food". After many complaints against the radio channel and radio DJ Lex Gaarthuis, formal apologies has been made on both accounts. A petition has been made in protest of racism against Chinese and other people of Asian descent named Wij zijn geen virussen (We are not viruses), which was signed 12,000 times within a day. The radio show host has not seen any punishment despite the petitions that were sent.

== Logos ==
Used from December 2003 to 23 September 2013

Used from 23 September 2013 to 4 September 2017

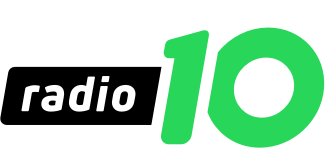
Used from 4 September 2017 to 31 August 2019

Used since 1 September 2019

== Frequency ==
- 828 kHz, broadcasting from Heinenoord near Rotterdam on AM, and could be heard in the South-West of the Netherlands and the North-West of Belgium.Also in Northern Germany.
