= Arrow Caz! =

- The Hague; Netherlands

Programming
- Format: Contemporary hit radio

Ownership
- Owner: Pako Media BV; Ad Ossendrijver

History
- First air date: 18 April 2006
- Former names: Caz!

Links
- Webcast: Webstream
- Website: Arrow Caz!

Arrow Caz is a national Dutch commercial radio station. The station is owned by Pako Media BV and only aired even over the Internet.

== History ==
Arrow Caz was on 18 April 2006 (under the name Caz!) start on the former frequencies Yorin FM. Several months SBS Broadcasting took over the station before that of RTL Nederland. Caz! has been through several name changes emerged from HitRadio Veronica.

In early 2006, SBS Broadcasting the loss-making Yorin FM from RTL Nederland. SBS retained a large part of the staff and decided to change both the format and the name of the station. Former BNN director Gerard Timmer was recruited to launch the new radio station and train. In late March the new name was announced: Caz!. The name was chosen because it was felt that the station had to have a person's name with personality and character. Caz! is not an acronym and stands for nothing. Caz! officially started on Tuesday 18 April 2006 at 06.00.

Although SBS at the start of Caz! indicated that the company for several years wanted to invest in the drive and stamina would have been after a few months reduced the marketing budget and could not be more investments made. This proved difficult for Caz! to grow in the highly competitive world of radio. For director Gerard Timmer was in April 2007, one year after the start, a reason to leave.

== The acquisition of Caz! Arrow through the media group, Caz! FM ==
On 21 June 2007 it was announced that Caz! July 1 is acquired by Arrow. Reason for SBS to sell the station, according to Gerard Timmer acquisition of SBS Broadcasting by the German ProSiebenSat.1 Media, with the loss-making Caz! the value of SBS Broadcasting bustle. The acquisition of SBS Broadcasting by ProSiebenSat.1 Media was announced on 27 June 2007. From Sunday 1 July 2007 to 11 March 2009, Arrow Classic Rock broadcast on the former FM frequencies of Caz!, making the station off the air is gone. Caz! is continued through the cable, satellite (Astra 1) and internet.

On 7 September 2007 it was announced that Caz! would continue with five DJs: Albert-Jan Sluis, Maurice Verschuuren, Rinse Blanksma, Martin Pieters (Welcome-to-your-weekendmix) DJ Jean (Madhouse @ Midnight) and Joshua Walter (Blended). Because Verschuuren and Blanksma went to work at Arrow Classic Rock, DJ Jean to SLAM!FM left, Martin Peters and Albert-Jan Sluis the only remaining DJs CAZ! Late March / early April 2009 it was announced that Martin Pieters and Albert-Jan Sluis leave at CAZ!. They both went to work at Radio Decibel, so there are now no more DJs are actively CAZ!

From 10 July 2008 to 10 March 2009 sent Caz! on the medium wave frequency 828 kilohertz. Caz! was temporarily put on this frequency until the start of the radio station would broadcast it with a talc-like format, called Arrow Talks. Ultimately, this did not take place, partly because Arrow could not finance it.

On Friday 22 May 2009 cable operator Ziggo, in consultation with Caz!, decided to transmit the signal from Caz! through to terminate the analog and digital radio packet. This is due to the fact that Rokit BV, BV behind the Arrow-Caz! went bankrupt. As of 1 July 2009 Caz! disappeared, also at UPC analogue cable and satellite with Canal Digital, but remains at UPC Digital and Internet still available. Meanwhile Arrow Caz weather FTA via the Astra 3 to receive satellite.

From December 2009 Caz! was renamed, the present name is Arrow Caz.

== Podcasts ==
Caz was also known for their podcast "Welcome to your weekend mix", where other radio stations like Radio 538 later started. However, they were not the first who started with podcasts, which was Kink FM The Welcome to your weekend mix with effect from 10 April 2009 moved with Martin Pieters and Albert-Jan Sluis to Radio Decibel

Additionally Madhouse@Midnight and Blended were also in the top 50 podcasts Netherlands.

== Programs ==
Since its acquisition by Arrow, Caz played predominantly non-stop music. Albert-Jan Sluis presented on 3 September 2007 to 3 April 2009 Monday Thursday still program, and on Friday nights with "The Weekend Mix" and on Saturday nights the recurrence. Below this radio station has gone completely nonstop.
