= Qmusic =

Qmusic may refer to:

== Radio stations ==
- Qmusic (Flanders), a commercial radio station of the Medialaan group in Flanders since 12 November 2001
- Qmusic (Netherlands), a commercial radio station in the Netherlands since 31 August 2005
- Qmusic Limburg, a regional commercial radio station in the Dutch province of Limburg since 1 June 2014

== Other uses ==
- QMusic (Australia), the music industry development association for Queensland, Australia
