= Wouter van der Goes =

Dutch radio DJ

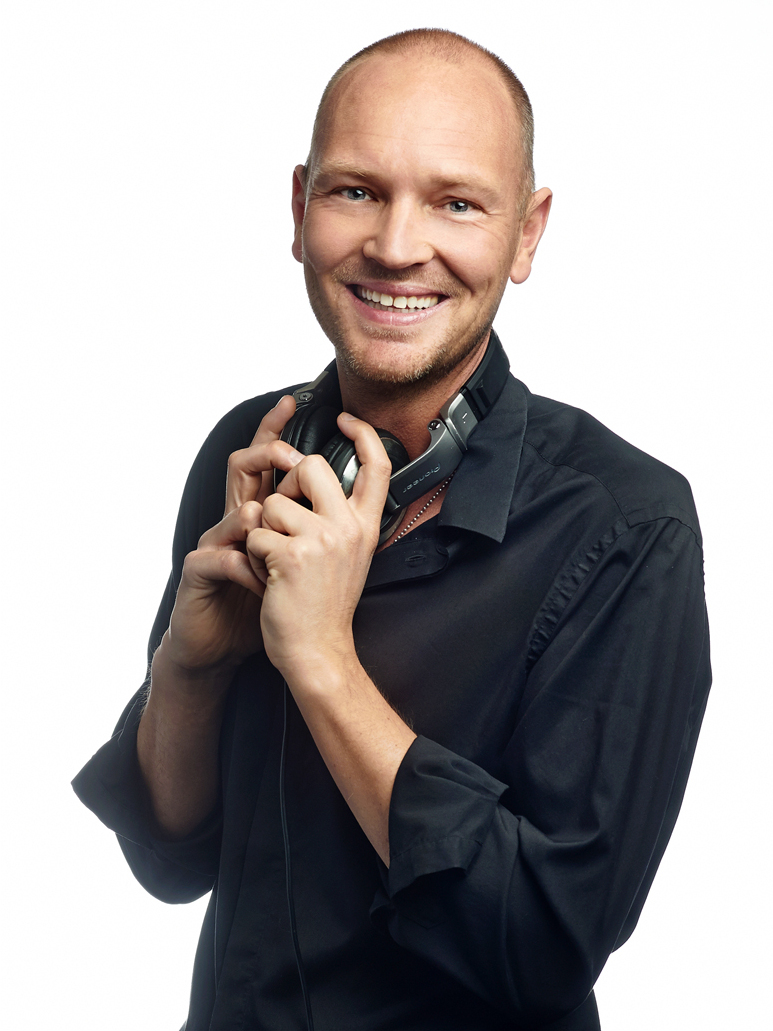
Wouter van der Goes

Wouter van der Goes (born 18 January 1973, Alkmaar) is a Dutch radio DJ.

== Life and career ==
At age twelve, he was tinkering with audio equipment as a hobby. Later, during his free time, he worked with several local radio stations, as well as pirate stations, while having a regular job as an insurance salesman.

In 1995, Van der Goes is hired by Radio 538 and turns his hobby into a job. He has hosted several shows, such as Weekend Warming Up, Peepshow, After Dark and 538 Classics.

In 1998 he transfers to Veronica FM, which in 2001 changed its name to Yorin FM. At this station, his shows include Gijs & Wout in de middag ("Gijs & Wout in the afternoon"), which he hosts together with Gijs Staverman.

Between 2004 and 2006 he hosted the show Wout! on 3FM radio, every day between 16:00 and 18:00. He participated in the House of Glass during the Serious Request project twice.

He is now a programme director for Q-Music.
