= HitRadio Veronica (Sky Radio) =

- Naarden; Netherlands
- Broadcast area: Netherlands
- Frequency: Nationwide via the Internet

Programming
- Format: Pop music

Ownership
- Owner: Sky Radio Group
- Sister stations: Radio Veronica

History
- First air date: December 27, 2006, 12:00 as TMF Radio; April 3, 2009, 18:00 as TMF HitRadio; November 1, 2009 as HitRadio; September 1, 2010 as HitRadio Veronica
- Former call signs: HitRadio; TMF HitRadio; TMF Radio

Links
- Webcast: Webstream
- Website: www.hitradioveronica.nl

HitRadio Veronica is a Dutch radio station that broadcasts over the internet. On December 27, 2006, at 12:00pm TMF Radio was officially launched. TMF Radio until October 1, 2008, had a partnership between Sky Radio Group (Sienna Holding BV) and MTV Networks Benelux (TMF) and transmitted mostly hits from the cable frequency of Hitradio BV, which was acquired permanently in the spring of 2007 by Sky Radio Group and MTV Networks BV. MTV Networks has split on October 1, 2008, from TMF Radio and since then Sky Radio Group is the sole owner of the station, which now bears the name HitRadio Veronica. On January 3, 2011, the station ceased to listen to the broadcasts via cable and since the station is only through Internet.

The launch of the radio station gave quite a stir in the media. Ali B. (Ali Bouali) held on behalf of TMF, a fireworks launch with Yesser Roshdi ('Yes-R') and MTV VJs Miljouschka Witzenhausen and Valerio Zeno in accordance with TMF's 'most boring town in the Netherlands'; Staphorst. For this fireworks show MTV Networks BV had no license and was later claimed by the municipality for holding the event near a burial site of a 19-year-old. Staphorst wanted to sue Yes-R and Ali B for illegally using fireworks. It was found later on that the funeral of the 19-year-old boy was long before the fireworks show, so the charges were dropped.

== History of branding ==
On 1 April 2009 it was announced that the name TMF Radio is renamed on April 3, 2009, to TMF HitRadio. After MTV Networks had retired on October 1, 2008, from the radio station, the Telegraaf Media Group decided to change the name to TMF HitRadio. No later than October 1, 2009 TMF Radio was scheduled to be renamed HitRadio. The deadline for this was extended to November 2009.

On September 18, Sky Radio Group announced to change the name of TMF HitRadio per October 1, 2009 to HitRadio TMS, where TMS stood for "The Music Station".

At the end of September, Sky Radio Group announced that the scheduled name change was canceled. Ultimately, Sky Radio Group decided to change the name HitRadio. This name change is per 1 November 2009 implemented. Between July and December 1992, Sky Radio Group has been active with a short cable station called HitRadio. This radio station was on December 11, 1992, Radio 538. From that period, Sky Radio Group trademark of the departed to start again on 1 November 2009 'HitRadio' left over.

On September 1, 2010, the name was changed again, this time to HitRadio Veronica. Since January 3, 2011, the radio station only to hear over the internet rather than via cable. The name HitRadio Veronica has existed before, in 1995 when Veronica was also the commercial station HitRadio Veronica. HitRadio Veronica was the successor of HitRadio 1224. The station went on September 1, 1995, start on the medium wave frequency 828 kHz's (362 m) and 1224 kHz (245 m).

== Logos ==
Used from September 1, 2010, to November 19, 2014

Used since November 19, 2014

== See also ==
- List of radio stations in the Netherlands
