= Sky Radio =

- Hilversum; Netherlands
- Frequencies: Netherlands: 101.0–101.9 MHz (FM); 11C (DAB+); Hilversum: 101.2 (FMeXtra)

Programming
- Format: Soft pop (adult contemporary) (1980s–today)

Ownership
- Owner: Talpa Audio; Subsidiary of Talpa Network
- Sister stations: Radio 538, Radio 10, Radio Noordzee

History
- First air date: September 30, 1988 (as a cable-only radio station)

Links
- Webcast: Skyradio; Skyradio Hits; Skyradio 80's Skyradio 90's Skyradio Summerhits; Skyradio Lounge; Skyradio Love Songs; The Christmas Station; Playlist
- Website: skyradio.nl

Sky Radio is a Dutch commercial radio station playing non-stop Adult Contemporary pop music, owned by Talpa Holding. The target audience is men and women between 25 and 54 years of age. It is programmed according to the AC format (any popular song from the 1980s to today that is not rap/hip hop, hard rock, or dance). It is DJ-free and the music is interrupted only to broadcast news, weather, advertisements and traffic reports.

== History ==
Sky Radio launched in the Netherlands on 30 September 1988 and was founded by Veronica DJ's Lex Harding and Ton Lathouwers. At the time, commercial radio broadcasting in the Netherlands was not permitted; therefore, the station was available only via cable.

In February 1992, the station was temporarily allocated the terrestrial frequency of 102.7 in western Netherlands (Rotterdam Waalhaven) after proceedings before the Board of Appeal for Industry to be assigned this so-called "residual frequency". This procedure and other test cases in which FM terrestrial frequencies under judicial pressure were made available to commercial radio stations were otherwise formally led by two media legal experts from the University of Amsterdam under the title "De Vrije Ether b.v." (English: The Free Ether Ltd.).

Sky Radio had a second station called Hitradio between July and December 1992. This station could only be received via cable and was replaced after 11 December 1992 by Radio 538, founded by Lex Harding and Erik de Zwart. The name HitRadio has been in use again since 1 November 2009 by Sky Radio Group for the cable radio station formerly known as TMF HitRadio.

When in 1994 the terrestrial frequencies were redistributed again and awarded to commercial radio stations, Sky Radio and Radio 538 fell to the wayside, and initially, Sky Radio failed to be awarded a licence. After both stations had protested against this, they were both assigned a frequency. Both Sky Radio and Radio 538 appealed against this decision. Sky Radio was eventually allocated a frequency of 100.7 with an additional frequency of 100.4 in the north of the Netherlands, a few low-powered fillers and some relay stations. In the Netherlands, Sky Radio took over the leading position from Radio 3FM in 1997. On 21 June 2004 Sky Radio, however, was passed by Radio 538.

In 2003, all broadcasting frequencies were reallocated and redistributed and Sky Radio switched to its current frequencies of 101.0 to 101.9 MHz. Since then, Sky Radio can be received in the Netherlands on frequencies between 101.0 and 101.9 MHz. In March 2005, the corporate identity and logo of Sky Radio were replaced with a completely new design.

In February 2006, Sky Radio was bought from News Corporation for €190 million by the Telegraaf Media Group NV. The Veronica association is shareholder of 10% of Sky Radio (Group).

In 2006, Sky Radio introduced a so-called muziekgarantie (music warranty), promising not to play the same track twice between 9 AM and 5 PM. In 2008, the station abandoned this principle. In July 2011, they reintroduced the formula under the title "the no repeat workday". It was once again thrown overboard in the summer of 2013.

After the collapse of the transmitter mast Zendstation Smilde at Hoogersmilde in July 2011, the station was temporarily taken off air in the far northeast of the country - the station operated on a number of low-power temporary frequencies in that area (including the frequency of 89.2 which lies outside its standard allocation) until summer 2012.

The station has undergone modernization in recent years. Half of the playlist now consists of current hit songs by artists such as Adele, Ilse Delange, Train, Michael Bublé, P!nk, Robbie Williams and Bløf. In 2011, the Sky audio logo was modified after 23 years, changing all jingles and the news, weather and traffic leaders. In 2012, the image logo was also adapted and modernized.

Philip Alberdingk Thijm has been CEO of Sky Radio Group since 2012. The program director of Sky Radio is Uunco Cerfontaine. Previously, he was program director of Radio 538.

The voice-overs of the station belong to Mark Labrand and Kimberly van de Berkt. Sky Radio had its own news service from 1992 until early 2013, but it disappeared due to budget cuts.

During the winter months, Sky Radio is available along the east coast of England due to the clear airwaves.

=== Music ===
Starting in 2017, Sky Radio broadcasts Christmas music from 20 November to 26 December. Before, this was from 6 December onwards. During this period, they present themselves as 'The Christmas Station' through commercials on TV and posters at bus and tram stops and train and metro stations. It is also explicitly stated on Sky Radio's website. On Christmas Day, "The Christmas Top 50" is broadcast, featuring the best Christmas songs. This program has attracted up to six million listeners at times, according to research by Intomart GfK. Every year from 1 October onwards, Sky Radio broadcasts the Internet radio station Sky Radio: The Christmas Station, which features non-stop Christmas music for three months. Furthermore, Sky Radio broadcasts the Valentijns Top 101 every year on Valentine's Day, a list composed of the 101 best Valentine Hits according to listeners.

== Abroad ==
Sky Radio has also been active in Denmark and Sweden for several years. In Sweden, Sky Radio was active for several years until November 1999. Denmark had the station from 2003 to 2005, the largest air coverage of all Danish commercial radio stations. Although the station was very popular in the beginning, the listening figures dropped rapidly and fell against the revenue, partly because of strong competition from state broadcaster Danmarks Radio and Radio 100FM (part of Talpa Capital). A format change which makes henceforth presented programs were told not to avail. On 14 November 2005 at 11:59 pm Sky Radio Denmark stopped its broadcasts.

In Germany, Sky Radio has had a station in the state of Hessen. Sky Radio Hessen started on 24 December 2001, initially as a soft pop station. As of 11 January 2005 presented broadcasts with a format change are implemented as hitradio station. In July 2006 it seemed like to have extracted a success, but this later proved to be relative. Ultimately it is for the Telegraaf Media Groep NV been a consideration to sell 49% of the station in November 2007 in Regiocast in preparation for a full sale. On 5 August 2008 the brand name Sky Radio in Germany was that as 'superhit' radio station was abandoned active since 2005. Since 5 August 2008 Sky Radio Group (51%) and Regiocast (49%) is in Hessen active with Radio BOB! with a rock/pop format. On 15 December 2008 Sky Radio Group sold its 51% stake in Radio BOB! to Regiocast which thus became the sole owner of Radio BOB!

== Spin-off stations ==
Sky Radio also broadcast a number of spin-off stations which are available only via the Internet:

- Sky Radio Hits
- Sky Radio Love Songs
- Sky Radio 80's
- Sky Radio 90's
- Sky Radio 00's
- Sky Radio Running Hits
- Sky Radio Lounge
- Sky Radio NL – Dutch music only
- Sky Radio Dance Classics
- Sky Radio Summer Hits (from 21 June until October)
- Sky Radio Christmas (from October until January)
- Sky Radio Non-stop

== Logos ==
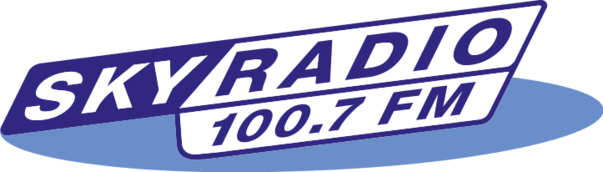
Used from April 16, 1998 to June 1, 2003

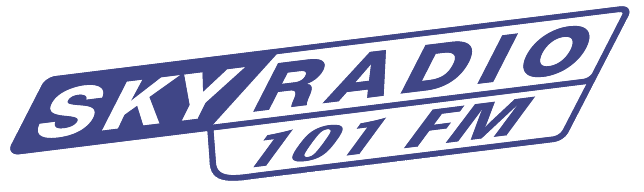
Used from June 1, 2003 to March 13, 2005

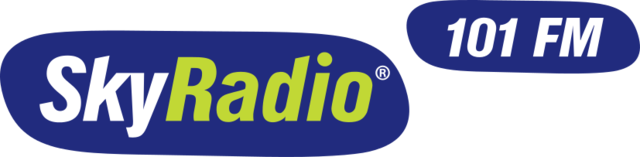
Used from March 14, 2005 to September 20, 2012

Sky Radio Hessen logo

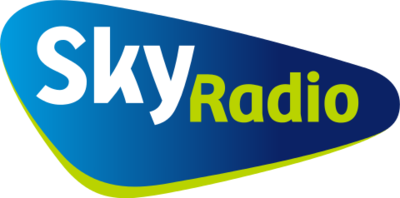
Used from September 20, 2012 to September 23, 2019

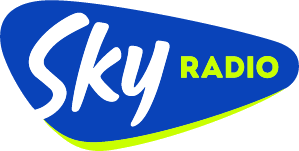
Used since September 23, 2019

== See also ==
- Sky Radio Group
- Radio Veronica (Sky Radio)
- List of radio stations in the Netherlands
