= Countdown (Dutch TV program) =

Dutch music television program (1978-1993)

- Genre: Music
- Created by: Rob de Boer productions
- Creative director: Rob de Boer
- Presented by: Erik de Zwart; Adam Curry; Simone Walraven; Wessel van Diepen; Jasper Faber
- Country of origin: Netherlands
- Original language: Dutch

Production
- Executive producer: Rob de Boer
- Production location: Bussum

Original release
- Network: Nederland 2
- Release: 1978 – 1993

Countdown is a Dutch music television program which was broadcast by the public broadcasting system Veronica from 1978 to 1993. It ranked as one of the top music television programs in Europe. Due the popularity of the program, one of its hosts, Adam Curry, became a celebrity. Other hosts included Simone Walraven, Jasper Faber, Erik de Zwart and Wessel van Diepen.

A special English-language edition of Countdown was produced for pan-European music channel Music Box super channel in 1986-87, with presenters Adam Curry and Erik de Zwart.

The program may have been inspired by the Australian music show CountDown, which aired from 8 November 1974 until 19 July 1987.
