= Talpa Network =

Dutch media conglomerate

Talpa
- Formerly: Talpa Network (until 2026)
- Industry: Media
- Founded: 2017
- Founder: John de Mol Jr.
- Headquarters: Hilversum, Netherlands
- Key people: John de Mol Jr. (Founder & CEO)
- Owner: John de Mol Jr. via Talpa Holding
- Parent: Talpa Holding N.V.
- Divisions: Talpa Video; Talpa Audio; Talpa Media
- Website: talpa.com

Talpa (known as Talpa Network until 2026) is a Dutch media company founded by John de Mol Jr. in November 2017. The company comprises a conglomerate of television, radio, and advertising operations and is part of Talpa Holding N.V.

== History ==
Talpa was created in 2017 by John de Mol when he merged all his various media assets, De Mol wanted to create a Dutch media conglomerate that could stand against foreign media companies entering the Dutch market. When Talpa Holding and Sanoma acquired SBS Broadcasting in 2011, the Netherlands Authority for Consumers and Markets forced De Mol to sell his minority stake in RTL Nederland. De Mol would remain a minority shareholder in SBS Broadcasting, until 2017 when his Talpa Holding acquired all remaining shares in SBS Broadcasting from Sanoma for €237 million. After the sale of RTL Nederland, De Mol took full ownership of Radio 538, SLAM! FM and Radio 10 Gold. In October 2016 De Mol merged his radio stations with the radio stations of the Telegraaf Media Groep into Talpa Radio, a joint venture in which he would hold a 77% stake. He also wanted to fully acquire the Telegraaf Media Groep in which he already had a minority share and merge it with SBS Broadcasting. The Belgian Mediahuis also made several offers for the remaining shares and were the winner of the acquisition, leaving De Mol as a minority shareholder. In December 2017 De Mol sold his 29% share to Mediahuis, but acquired full ownership of Talpa Radio. Other notable acquisitions were StukTV (2018), ANP (2018), Linda. Magazine (2019), Gierige Gasten (2019) and TVGids.tv (2019).

=== Cancelled merger ===
After John de Mol raised his stake in SBS Broadcasting in 2017 to full ownership he sought a partnership with RTL Nederland. In his opinion there wasn't enough space for two major Dutch commercial television networks in the changed media landscape, RTL shut down his offer. However, in June 2021 RTL Nederland and Talpa Network announced plans for a merger, pending approval by the European Commission and the Netherlands Authority for Consumers and Markets. In the new conglomerate, RTL Nederland is to hold 70% of the shares and Talpa Holding 30%. Talpa Entertainment Productions and Talpa Concepts won't be a part of the merger. Both parties reasoned that a merger was the only solution to an ever growing presence of foreign media parties, giving space to a single commercial Dutch media company that's capable of producing specifically for the Dutch market. Critics however claimed that the failing of Talpa Network is the reason behind the merger. In January 2022 the Netherlands Authority for Consumers and Markets stated that it could not approve the merger as of yet and that further investigation to the consequences of price, quality and innovation is necessary. On the 30th of January 2023 the Authority announced that it would not approve the merger, citing that the merged company would become too powerful.

== Assets ==
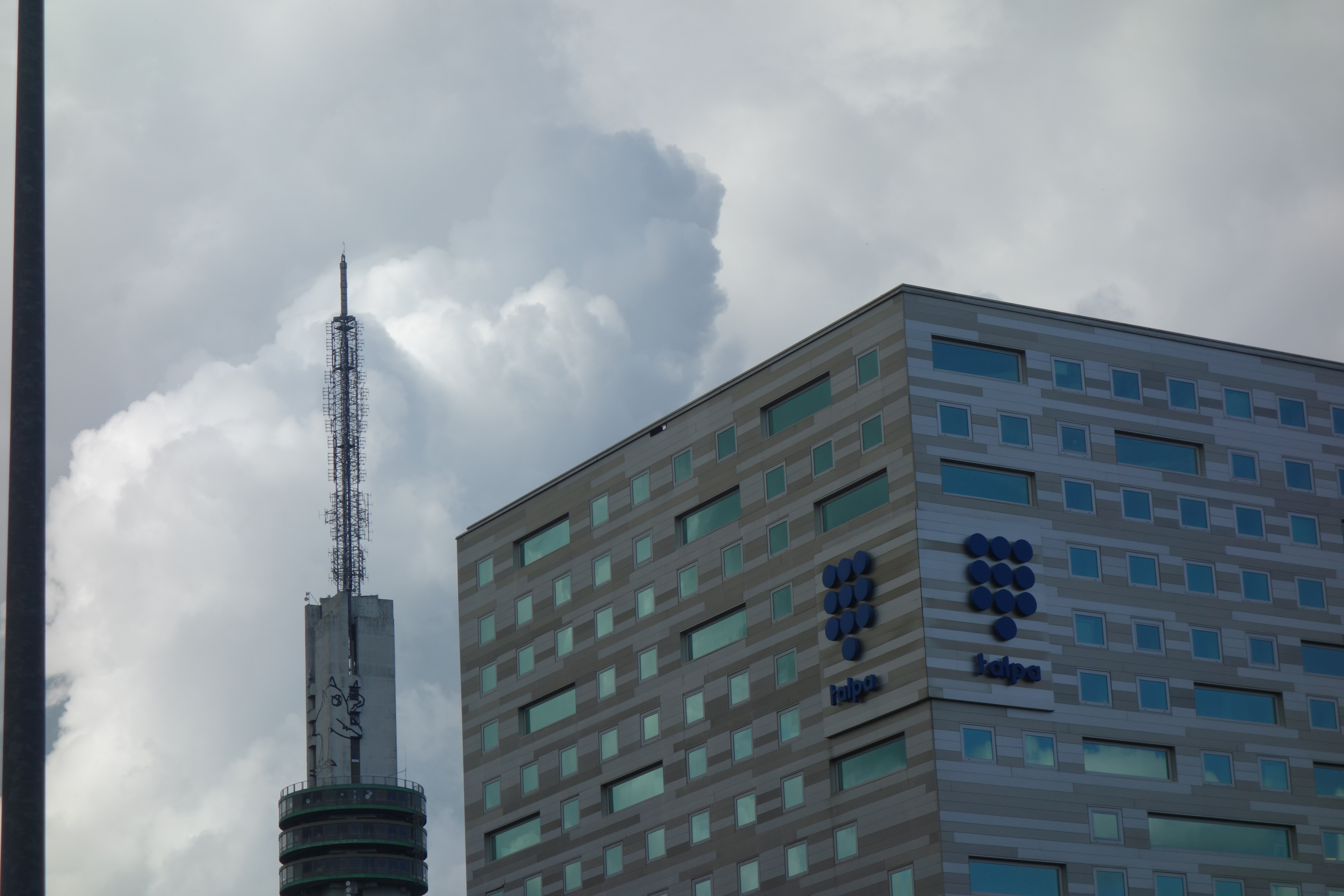
Talpa Headquarters

=== Talpa Video ===
- SBS6, the group's flagship channel
- Net5, focused on the female demographic
- Veronica, focused on the male demographic. Shares the channel with Disney Jr., formerly Disney XD.
- SBS9, focused on movies and series
- KIJK, catching up service
- StukTV, YouTube channel acquired in 2018
- Nieuwe Gasten, (formerly: Gierige Gasten), YouTube channel acquired in 2019

=== Talpa Audio ===
- Radio 538
- TV538, an online television channel
- Radio 10
- Sky Radio
- Radio Noordzee

=== Other ===
- Talpa Media, advertising and media sales business
- Talpa Studios, television production company
- S1, influencer agency

== Former assets ==
- LINDA., magazine and online platform, sold to DPG Media in 2026
- New Wave, youth media platform, discontinued in 2021 after Talpa ended the joint venture.
- Talpa Gaming, gaming joint venture with Azerion, fully acquired by Azerion in 2021.
- Talpa E-Commerce, e-commerce division, discontinued in 2024 after its platforms were sold to House of Tickets.
- Weer.nl and TVGids.TV, sold to Kompas Publishing in 2023.
- JUKE, online audio platform, discontinued in 2025.
- VoetbalTV, amateur football video platform jointly owned with the KNVB, ceased operations and filed for bankruptcy in 2020.
- Talpa TV / Tien (2004–2007), Talpa TV started in late 2004 and began its broadcasts on 13 August 2005 under the same name Talpa. Talpa (later Tien) aired daily from 18:00 on the channel that was filled during the day by the children's channel Nickelodeon. From Saturday, 16 December 2006 the station was broadcasting 24 hours a day. That was a long-cherished wish of Talpa-founder John de Mol fulfilled. The station distinguished itself from the competition by allowing existence more than 80% of its interpretation of Dutch products. In addition, managed Talpa Content the majority of its program rights. On 27 June 2007, the channel closed due to disappointing ratings. The channel was sold to RTL Nederland and was rebranded to RTL 8.
- RTL Nederland (2007–2011), Talpa Holding had a 26.3% share obtained after their sell of channel Tien and radio station Radio 538.
- Talpa Radio
  - 4FM (2004–2007)
  - Radio 100 FM (2003–2009)
  - Noordzee FM
- Fuel for Travel, a digital content store at Schiphol Airport.
- Mundo, an independent dating site.
- Skoeps.nl (2006–2008), in October 2006 Talpa Holding, together with PCM Uitgevers, launched the news-in-picture Skoeps.nl website. Aim of this website was to offer user-generated content; visitors could post their own news photos and videos. Should user-generated content be successfully sold to other news media, then profits would be shared with the creator. Operations were terminated on 5 May 2008 because they never became profitable.
- Talpa Music (2005–2014), Talpa Music engages in the international and national production of music, the exploitation of copyrights, music publishing, production and licensing of image and sound carriers, developing artists and their image (merchandise), advice on music industry and the exploitation of music in the area of internet applications. On an international level Talpa Music works with composers among others Burt Bacharach, Tom Waits, Bill Withers, Maxi Jazz (Faithless) and Lil John (Usher). It was eventually sold to BMG Rights Management.
- Talpa Media (2005–2019), production company sold to ITV Studios in 2015.
- Talpa Scandinavia (2006–2007)
- Radio Digitaal (2006–2008), the first Dutch commercial online radio platform.
- ANP (2018–2021), news agency sold to investor Chris Oomen.
- Radio Veronica, the station was sold to Mediahuis in April 2023. Due to a legal change it was no longer allowed for a single party to hold more than three FM frequencies.
