= Sky Radio Group =

Chain of Dutch radio stations

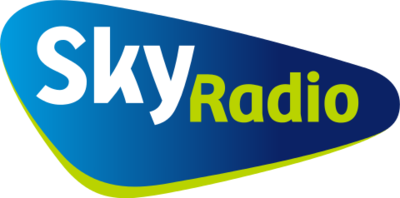
- Industry: Media
- Founded: September 30, 1988 as spin-off of Sky Channel
- Headquarters: Naarden, Netherlands
- Products: Radio
- Owner: Telegraaf Media Groep (90%); Vereniging Veronica (10%)
- Website: www.skyradiogroup.nl

Sky Radio Group is a chain of radio stations in Netherlands. The radio group is 90% held by Telegraaf Media Groep NV and 10% of Vereniging Veronica.

In the Netherlands, the Sky Radio Group is next to the main station Sky Radio also owner of Radio Veronica, HitRadio and Classic FM and was also briefly seller of advertising time on Kink FM. The now defunct Kink FM was part of the Vereniging Veronica.

From October 1 till December 27, 2006 the Sky Radio Group provided to the cable signal of the former Dutch pop station RTL FM, the last time under the name RTL FM, Sky Radio presents The Christmas Station. The cable network RTL FM BV was then taken over and BV was renamed Hitradio BV. In late 2006 TMF Radio started on this channel, until November 2008 a joint venture of Sky Radio with MTV Networks BV. Since October 1, 2008 this station is fully owned by Sky Radio Group. On April 3, 2009 the name of TMF Radio was changed to TMF HitRadio. On November 1, 2009 the name of the radio station changed again, this time in HitRadio. HitRadio brings non-stop hit music.

On Sunday 21 August 2005, The Sunday Express reported that the News Corporation, Sky Radio Group (including Veronica and Classic FM) was put for sale for an amount of €295 million. The British division of Sky Radio Ltd. suffered in the year 2005 a loss of about £5.6 million. The reporting time was not officially confirmed by News itself. In February 2006, a consortium of De Telegraaf Media Groep NV and Vereniging Veronica with ING all shares. In mid-2007 the Telegraaf Media Groep took part of ING on which the publisher 85% of the company got hold of.

== Radio stations ==
- Sky Radio
- Radio Veronica
- Classic FM

== Internet radio channels ==
In addition to online listening choice of three radio stations Sky Radio Group offers some radio channels which can only be listened to via the Internet:

- Sky Radio LoveSongs
- Sky Radio Dance Classics
- Sky Radio NL
- Sky Radio Christmas
- Sky Radio Summerhits
- Veronica Top 1000 Allertijden
- Veronica Rock Radio
- HitRadio Veronica

In 2011, Sky Radio Group began developing MyRadio, an online platform for personalized radio. MyRadio offers about 25 stations based on various genres, from Urban to Indie and Pop to Opera. The stations are compiled and maintained by music directors, experts in each genre from the Dutch radio world.

The user chooses a station, then MyRadio compiles a playlist according to radio traditions. The listener can like tracks, dislike or skip ('not right now'). MyRadio fits on the basis of those signals of the playlist on the taste of the user by among other artist and track selection, mood and energy to send to the station. Each station is so completely personalized. Additionally, a user can create their own stations by combining two to eight base stations with freely adjustable proportions. Even these personal stations while listening always automatically adapted to the behavior of the listener.

In November 2012 MyRadio is publicly launched. In the first half of 2013, all internet stations of the Sky Radio Group one by one placed with MyRadio so those stations can also be personalized. The only exception is the Veronica Top 1000 Allertijden station, which has a fixed playlist (the latest edition of the Top 1000 Allertijden played in the order listed) and are therefore not suitable for personalization.
