= TV 538 =

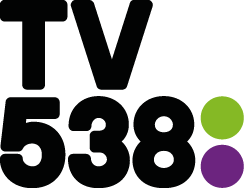
- Country: Netherlands
- Broadcast area: Netherlands

Programming
- Picture format: 1080i HDTV (downscaled to 16:9 576i for the SDTV feed)

Ownership
- Owner: Talpa Network

History
- Launched: 4 July 2011; 14 years ago

Links
- Website: www.tv538.nl/

Availability

Streaming media
- Ziggo GO: ZiggoGO.tv (Europe only)
- KPN iTV Online: Watch live (Europe only)

TV 538 is a music television channel that airs music videos and live coverage of its radio broadcasts. Dutch radio station Radio 538 launched the TV channel on 4 July 2011. The channel is owned by Talpa Network. It broadcasts 24 hours a day and airs across the Netherlands.

== History ==
Radio 538 started a television channel called TV 538 on July 4, 2011 in the Netherlands. The channel is passed via UPC and since September 2011 also at Ziggo. On July 4 TV 538 launched with a live broadcast of Barry Paf. The radio programs Evers Staat Op, de Coen and Sander Show and Daniël Lippens will be simulcast live every workday. On Friday between 17:30 and 18:00 De Week Van 538 will be shown, between 18:00 and 21:00 hours De Frank en Vrijdag Show with Frank Dane and on Saturday between 19:00 and 21:00 hours Top 40 with Jeroen Nieuwenhuize, in which only the most popular clips will be shown. At the weekend the radio program of Barend van Deelen can be seen. The programs Release Reacties, Lovers X Haters and The Beat can also be seen on the channel.

It used by to be the radio program Ruuddewild.nl seen on the channel between 18:00 to 19:00 hours and between 00:00 to 03:00 hours the radio program 53N8CLUB.

The primary focus is on non-stop music videos that can be requested by listeners. In addition, the channel airs entertainment, news, live performances, interviews and events, accompanied by the DJs of 538. The live broadcasts are both broadcast from a TV studio and on location while Turn up the Beach, Live38XXL, 538PUUR, 538 voor Warchild or 538 Demo Duel.

An HD-simulcast launched in January 2019.

== Logos ==
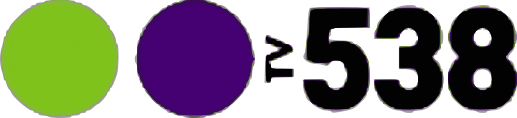
2011-2012

2012-2014

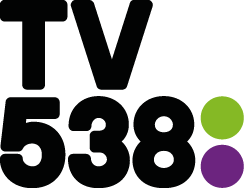
2014–present

== See also ==
- Radio 538
