= Qmusic Limburg =

Qmusic
- Geleen; Netherlands
- Broadcast area: Limburg
- Frequencies: 96.1 MHz: Central Limburg; 97.6 MHz: Maastricht e.o.; 97.7 MHz: Parkstad Limburg; 98.1 MHz: Southeast Limburg; 98.1 MHz: Sittard-Geleen; 98.5 MHz: Weert and surroundings

Programming
- Language: Dutch
- Format: CHR/Hot AC (1980s-today)

Ownership
- Owner: Bartelet Holding Maastricht B.V.
- Sister stations: Qmusic

History
- First air date: 1 June 2014

Links
- Website: www.qmusiclimburg.nl

Qmusic Limburg is a radio station in the Dutch province of Limburg. It is a joint venture between Qmusic and Bartelet Holding Maastricht B.V., owner of Radio Limburg.

Qmusic had no FM frequencies in the province of Limburg. Through a structure Qmusic can broadcast since 1 June 2014 in the province on a frequency package that is meant for a local radio station. RadioNL previously aired this. 20 hours a day the nationwide variant will be broadcast. Between 9:00 and 13:00, every day a regional program will be broadcast, which will be produced by Qmusic Netherlands, but another presenter. Between 9:00 and 10:00 Het Foute Uur is broadcast like on the national variant. Companies from the province can request their favorite wrong songs. The program between 10:00 and 13:00 was initially presented by Joep Roelofsen, but the baton was taken on 4 August 2014 by Jules van Hest.

== Logos ==
Used from 1 June 2014 to 30 August 2015

== See also ==
- List of radio stations in the Netherlands
