= Arrow Classic Rock =

- Noordwijk; Netherlands
- Frequency: DAB+

Programming
- Format: Classic/Modern rock

Ownership
- Owner: Media Management & Projects BV; Gerro Vonk

History
- First air date: 1996

Links
- Webcast: Webstream
- Website: Arrow.nl/

Arrow Classic Rock is a Dutch radio station, that plays classic rock and some modern rock. Arrow Classic Rock broadcasts on FM and is also receivable via cable, all nationwide. Owned by Ad Ossendrijver and Willem van Kooten, the station started broadcasts via all Dutch cablenetworks in 1996 and bought AM 828 from Veronica FM in 1998. In 2003 the frequencies of medium wave had been redistributed and the station moved to AM 675. In May 2007 Crosspoints BV, the company which produced Arrow Classic Rock and Arrow Jazz FM bought Caz! to use their FM frequencies. On 31 January 2008 they ceased their AM transmissions, transmitting an announcement in English advising their move to FM and to use the web stream. Three evenings a week, a variety of program specials can be heard. On Monday Liselotte Hegt presents the program Arrow High Voltage! (Metal/hard rock), on Tuesday Arie Verstegen presented Symphonic Mania! (Symphonic rock) and Wednesday to hear the Bluesbox Gerry Jungen.

The station can be received via DAB+, cable, DVB and the Internet.

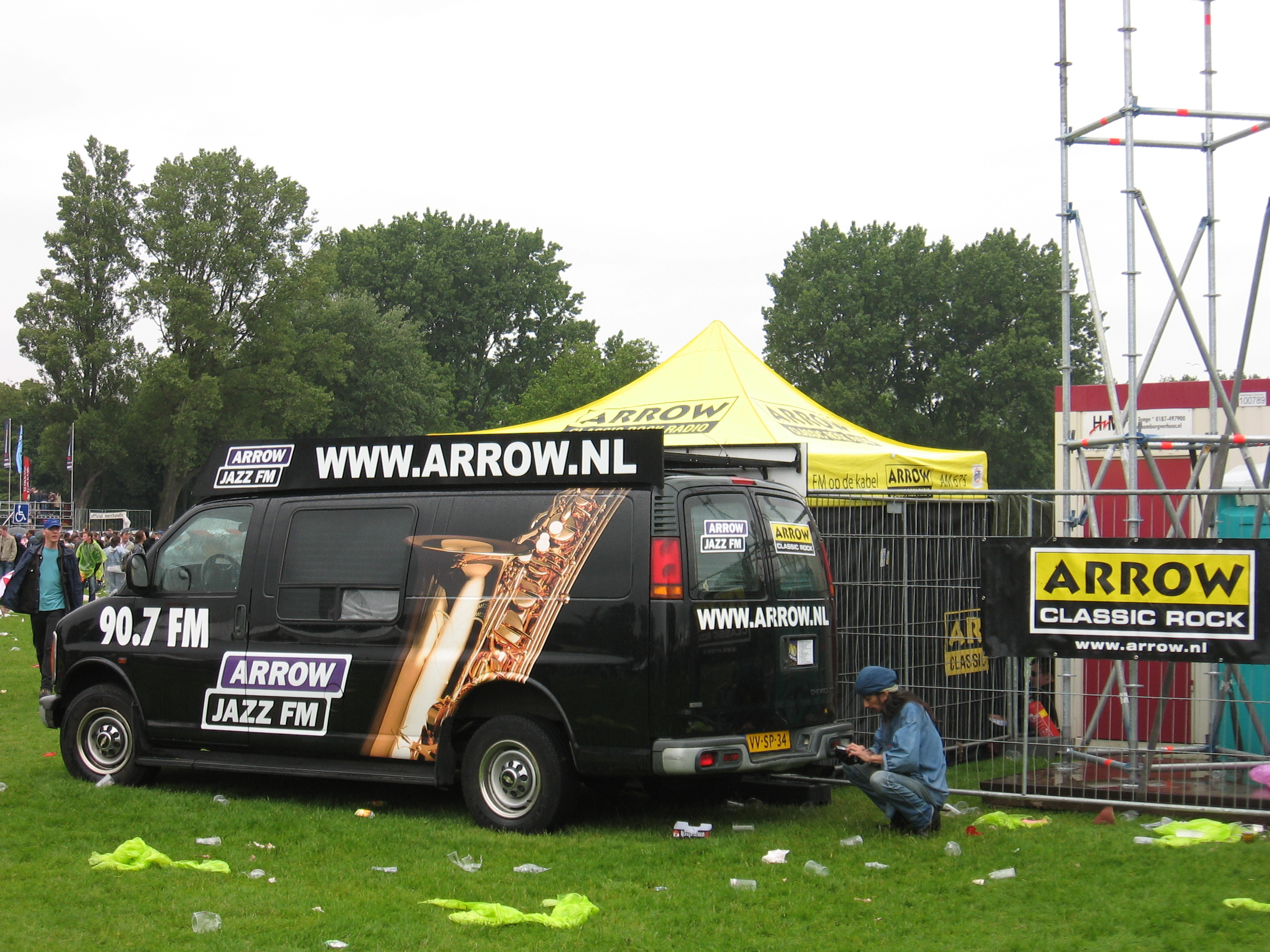

Once a year the station organizes Arrow Rock Festival, one of the largest rock festivals in the Netherlands with dozens of big-name bands playing every year. Aerosmith performed at Arrow Rock Festival 2007 along with Scorpions and Europe. In 2008, Kiss headlined the festival.

Arrow also contributes to the newly founded Pinkpop Classic rock festival, to be held August 2007 featuring the performance of Status Quo, among others.

In October Arrow has Rocktober which is in the spirit of Rock, that includes:

- The sympho-25 (the 25 best sympho-rock songs)
- The blues top 50
- The album top 100 of the 1970s, 1980s and 1990s
- The best guitar player, singer, bass player and drummer
- The Arrow rock 500
- British Invasion
- Rock in Waterland

== History ==
Ad Ossendrijver and Willem van Kooten started in autumn 1996 with Arrow Classic Rock Radio. The station sent non-stop rock music 24-hours a day via the cable. The philosophy was: first money, then attract DJs. On 1 April 1997 the broadcasting frequencies would be distributed. This was different. Only in 2003 the Dutch government passed after numerous legal procedures to divide FM frequencies.

On 15 January 1998, stopped Hitradio Veronica with broadcast via the medium. Arrow Classic Rock Radio took one of its frequencies over 828 kHz broadcast from Heinenoord. This could be achieved largely by Netherlands over the air. Later that year launched presented programs in the evenings. Gerry Jungen moved from the VARA to Arrow Classic Rock. René van den Abeele, which at Radio Noordzee Nationaal three years Rock from Holland had compiled and presented, adopted in February 1998 Classic Album Special on. He took care of the weekly program editing and presentation. He was also responsible for the editing of the weekly Rolling Stones Special which was presented by Luc van Rooij. Later, Harry de Winter (1999) and Kees Baars (2001) also place behind the Arrow microphone.

In May 2003, were the Dutch broadcasting frequencies really divided. In addition, Arrow Classic Rock offered a normal - recoup - amount to different FM frequency plots. They fell by their real bidding on the lots by the wayside because other parties offered much higher amounts. Thus, the transmitter was no airwave frequency. Soon, a deal was signed with Quality Radio, owner of AM 675 which Arrow Classic Rock still came into the ether.

In early 2004, the company began behind Arrow Classic Rock FM sister station called Arrow Jazz FM. The retirement benefit "Jazz" FM land was not divided in May 2003 and in November 2003 was still Van Kooten and Ossendrijver won.

In 2006, PCM joined as a shareholder to the Arrow Media Group and was pursued cross media. This was not really a success, and Ad Ossendrijver bought all the shares and independently with Arrow Classic Rock and Arrow Jazz FM continued, operated by Cross Point BV.

On 1 July 2007, the company CrossPoints BV Ad Ossendrijver took the ether frequencies of Caz! over by SBS Broadcasting and placed directly on the Arrow Classic Rock FM frequencies. The AM675 was done by early 2008 on Radio Maria. In May and June 2008 Arrow began testing Arrow Talks at 828 kHz, 362 m. But it remained only a test. On 10 July 2008, the Arrow radio group put the radio station Caz! temporarily in the area of the AM frequencies 828 kHz, 362 m.

From 2003 to 2008, it has organized the annual Arrow Rock Festival. In October, Arrow dominated by Rocktober, meaning that the Arrow Rock 500 and other Top X tables are turned in the sign of symphonic rock, metal and blues.

== FM closure ==
In February 2009, Crosspoints BV was ordered by the Radiocommunications Agency to cease Arrow Classic Rock broadcasting on the FM frequencies across the Netherlands by March 11 after a dispute about licence fees. Because of the 2008 financial crisis, Crosspoints BV was not longer able to pay millions for licence fees to the Dutch government for the distribution of a special interest music station. After FM-distribution stopped, Arrow Classic Rock was still broadcasting via all Dutch cable networks, online and on AM 828 kHz 24 hours a day. On 5 May 2009 Crosspoints switched off also the AM-transmitter because only a limited number of listeners could be reached.

== Programs ==
At the time of Arrow Classic Rock on the FM were told several presented programs on the channel. Rinse Blanksma presented Roadrunner from 12 November 2007 to 29 April 2009. The afternoon edition of this program was presented by Maurice Verschuuren. Furthermore, Manuela Kemp with the afternoon show Rock Temple between 12:00 and 13:00 hour, and Marisa Heutink with the evening program Rock of Ages to hear on the station. On weekends there are several themes of hours with different types of rock music. On the weekday evening is heard almost nonstop music under Classic Rock Around The Clock, in the hours before midnight Easy Rock & Ballads. Furthermore, there are made several days special programs in the evening, like every Tuesday from nine to ten hours Arrow Symfonisch presented by Kees Baars, BluesBox by Gerry Jungen on every Wednesday from nine to ten, and finally Wintertijd with Harry de Winter, every Friday presented the hours before midnight.

In 2012 heard there are different specials and presented programs on Arrow Classic Rock. On Tuesday night between nine and ten to hear the program Arrow Symphonic Mania. Gerry Jungen presents BluesBox on every Wednesday from nine to ten.

As of 14 February 2011, every Monday from nine to ten hard rock and heavy metal can be heard in the program Arrow HIGH VOLTAGE! The program is presented by Liselotte "Lilo" Hegt, herself as a singer and bass player in Dutch metal and hard rock bands is active. Currently she plays in "Robby Valentine" and "Dial".

In 2025 One of the highlights of the year is when they broadcast the ROCK 500 in October. This chart is compiled by their listeners. As usual, the musicstation repeat the ROCK 500 between Christmas and New Year's Eve.

Throughout the year, They organise various promotions, including “What is your favourite motorbike hit” and “May is BOSPOP month”. Listeners also have the chance to win tickets to festivals and concerts.

== New Company ==
Crosspoints BV closed the company in April 2009 and sold all assets of Arrow Classic Rock to a company owned by Ad Ossendrijver which continued the production and distribution of Arrow Classic Rock. Arrow Classic Rock was again a non-presented music station. In 2022 Radio Station Arrow Classic Rock wanted a FM license again.

== Arrow Classic Rock Noord ==
Arrow Classic Rock Noord was on 10 April 2011 until 28 February 2013, a regional version of Arrow Classic Rock that broadcast in Northern and Eastern Netherlands. It was the continuation of City FM Editie Noord.

The program Arrow Classic Rock Noord was produced by Flux Factory Media BV for NDC Mediagroep. The station played rock music of 'all time'. On 1 March 2013 the station was replaced by Freez FM.

== See also ==
- List of radio stations in the Netherlands
