= Qmusic (Netherlands) =

- Amsterdam; Netherlands
- Frequencies: FM: 100.4 MHz (Achterhoek, North Netherlands, Zeeland); 100.5 MHz (Northwest NL); 100.7 MHz (Twente and surroundings, Central and South Netherlands, Achterhoek (East), Zeeland); DVB-T: Bouquet 2 (Digitenne subscription required); DAB+: Channel 11C (220.352 MHz)

Programming
- Format: CHR/Hot AC

Ownership
- Owner: DPG Media
- Sister stations: Qmusic Limburg, Joe

History
- First air date: 31 August 2005

Links
- Webcast: Watch Live Radio; Playlist
- Website: www.qmusic.nl

Qmusic (previously written as Q-music) is a Dutch commercial radio station which has been broadcasting since 31 August 2005. The station is owned by the Belgian media company DPG Media.

== History ==
In 2005, Dutch entrepreneur John de Mol planned to purchase Radio 538, which was the current market leader. Due to an existing law preventing holding multiple unconditional broadcasting lots for FM Frequencies, his Talpa Radio holding had to sell Noordzee FM. On July 1, 2005 DPG Media purchased the NoordzeeFM radio station for the symbolic sum of one euro.

After two months with a stripped-down version of Noordzee FM have gone by, the new owners began on 31 August 2005, around 20:30, a few hours earlier than had been announced, one in Flanders already quite successful radio format, under the name Q-music. This so-called feel-good format with many recent hits, short links, a remarkable morning show and many actions, also caught on in the Netherlands. The market share rose significantly. In the months of September and October, Qmusic had a market share of 3.8% (2005), 6.3% (2006), 7.6% (2007), 6.7% (2008), 6.6% (2009), 7.5% (2010), 6.3% (2011), 7.5% (2012), 9.7% (2013), 9.7% (2014) and 9,9% (2015). In October and November 2014 was the second most listened radio station in the Netherlands for the first time. In 2008 and 2015, Qmusic won the Marconi Award for best radio station.

Qmusic used the first years of the Noordzee FM studio on the 's Gravelandseweg in Hilversum, but moved in the end of September 2009, to the former bubble-gum factory Maple Leaf on the industrial Overamstel in Amsterdam. The studio stands atop one of the buildings where an extra floor has been placed.

Since 2010, there has always more young talent heard on the station. From 2012, every year, at least one radio talent has graduated from the Qcollege.

== Programs ==
=== Workdays ===
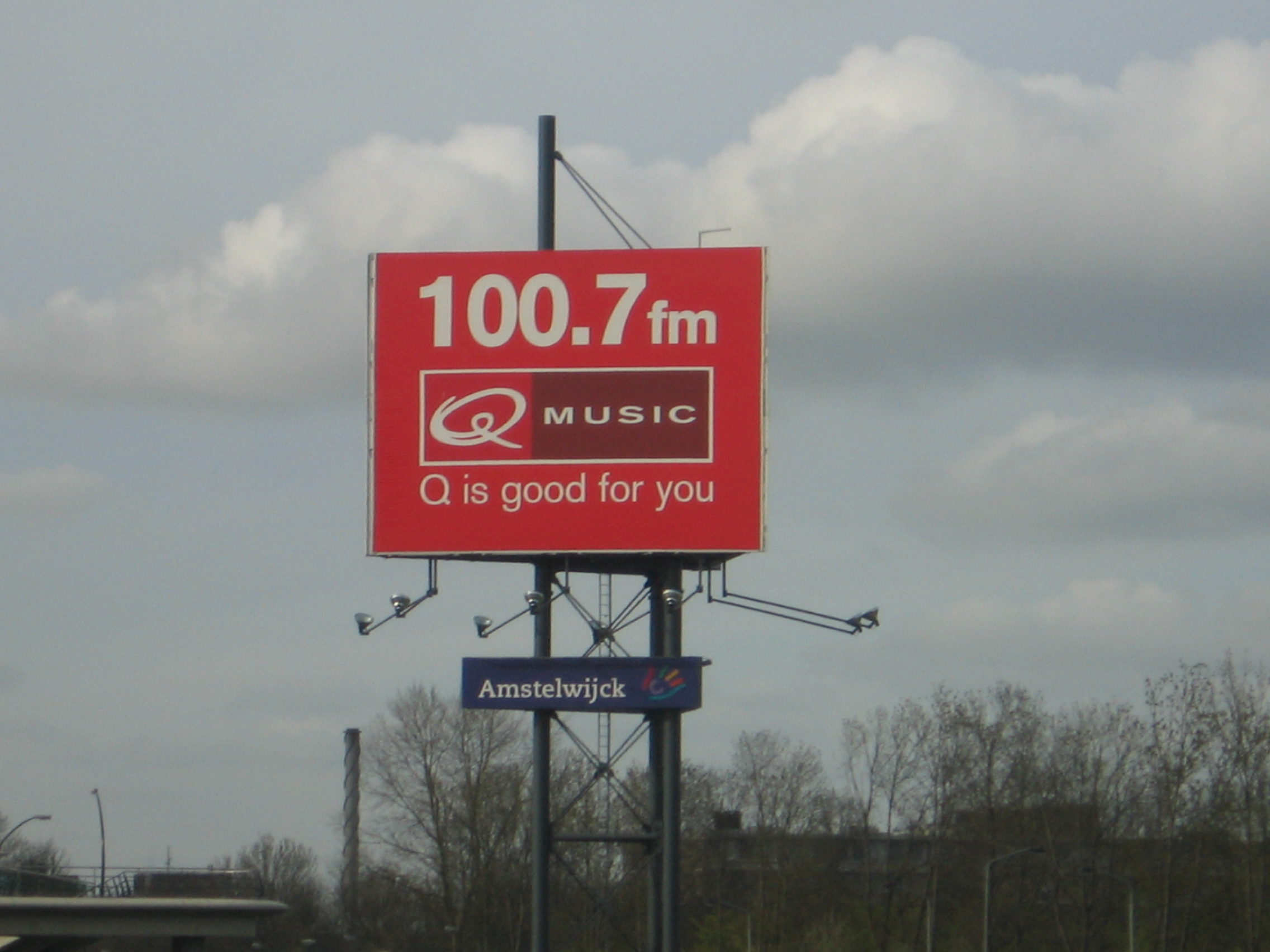
An old logo of Q-music on a billboard.

The first year started with the morning show Je dag is goed with Jeroen van Inkel. The presenter duo Mattie & Marieke have been presenting the morning show since 3 September 2018. Other morning shows were: Mattie & Wietze, ruuddewild.nl (later changed to Ruud de Wild & Q-ochtendshow and later Ruud de Wild in de Morgen), and Goeiemorgenshow. After the morning show followed Het Foute Uur and thereafter programs of Martijn Kolkman, Lieke Veld and Wim van Helden. Previously, among other Gijs Staverman and Wouter van der Goes heard during the day. The first years no presented programs were heard at night. In May 2010 Jasper de Vries presented between 4:00 and 6:00. In the autumn of 2010 there was a full night programming. Nighttime hours are mainly used to train young radio presenters. On Friday afternoon the Dutch Top 40 can be heard.

The afternoon show is presented by Domien Verschuuren since 2019. Former presenters of the afternoon show were Menno Barreveld (1 September 2005 to 7 March 2008) and Jeroen van Inkel with Van Inkel in de Middag.

In the evening many DJs have been heard. Menno Barreveld and Kai Merckx can be heard in 2016.

=== Weekend ===
The first year there were no presented programs heard on weekends. Between 7:00 and 18:00 listeners could request and announce music through the phone on the station. As of October 2006 there was a few months a full day programming with Daniel Smulders, Timon Jacobs and Marcel Vermeer. As of early 2007 only Smulders still presented the morning from 7:00 to 12:00.

In early 2010, the weekend program was expanded again. In the following years following the weekend programming has changed several times. With the departure of several DJs from the weekday programming streamed emerging talents of the Qcollege the weekday night programming through to the weekend programming.

In August 2020, QMusic replaced Radio 538 as the Dutch affiliate of Armin van Buuren's A State of Trance and the first affiliate for Armin's new show "Worldwide Club 20." The following year, QMusic added Afrojack's Jacked Radio and Sunnery James & Ryan Marciano's Smash the House Radio to the lineup of weekend shows. In 2022, the shows moved back to Radio 538.

== Digital stations ==
Qmusic also has a number of digital (theme) stations:

- Qmusic Non-Stop. This station was launched on 1 September 2013.
- Qmusic Het Foute Uur. This station was launched in late 2013.
- Qmusic Classics. This station was launched in May 2015.
- Qmusic Christmas. This station, which broadcasts non-stop Christmas music, could be heard from 4 to 26 December 2015. This station replaced temporarily Qmusic Classics.
- Qmusic Hot Now. Station that plays non-stop hits of the moment.

== Station Voices ==
- Menno Barreveld (2010–present)
- Lauretta Gerards (2011–present)

== Newsreaders ==
Every hour (with Mattie & Wietze and Niek van der Bruggen also on the half-hour), the news is broadcast, it is provided by the ANP. The regular newsreaders of Qmusic are:

- Anne-Marie Rozing (morning show)
- Fien vermeulen (afternoon show)

At other times the news is read by newscasters associated with the ANP.

== Q-vakantiekracht ==
This was a temporary program in 2011 and 2012 for several weeks in the summer or during the New Year where each day between 12 and 13 hours a celebrity presented a lunch program. The technique was mostly owned by Wim van Helden or Martijn Kolkman.

From 25 July 2011 to 12 August 2011 were heard consecutively: Henkjan Smits, Karin Bloemem, Jan de Hoop, Lola Brood, Jan Kooijman, Eddy Zoëy, Rens Goseling, Guido Weijers, Lucille Werner, Kim-Lian van der Meij, Dennis van der Geest and "Star" of Oh oh Cherso (Tony Wyczynski).

From 2 January 2012 to 6 January 2012 were heard consecutively: Barbara Barend, Arie Koomen, Raymond van de Klundert, Alberto Stegeman and Maik de Boer.

From 2 July 2012 to 20 July 2012 were heard consecutively: Tim Coronel, Emile Ratelband, Isabelle Brinkman, Rik van de Westelaken, Ymke Wieringa, Art Rooijakkers, Ruben van der Meer, Piet Paulusma, Robert Kranenborg, Kim Kötter, Britt Dekker, Mari van de Ven, Jeffrey Wammes, Ellen ten Damme and Fiona Hering.

From 27 August to 7 September 2012 politicians 'agency' in run-up to the parliamentary elections in 2012. Successively were heard: Renske Leijten (SP), Geert Wilders (PVV), Tofik Dibi (GroenLinks), Alexander Pechtold (D66), Sybrand van Haersma Buma (CDA), Fred Teeven (VVD), Tanja Jadnanansing (PvdA), Hero Brinkman (DPK), Arie Slob (Christian Union) and Marianne Thieme (PvdD).

== Qcollege ==
In 2008, Qmusic started Q-academy in Belgium. The aim is to train people to a professional radio host. This was a great success and therefore Q-music Netherlands started in September 2011 with a radio program called Qcollege. The winner receives a fixed radio program on the channel. Usually starts the selection round in late September/early October. After several rounds of selection ultimately remain there a few candidates. In March or April of this year the winner will be posted.

Winners Qcollege:

- 2011–2012: Erik van Roekel.
- 2012–2013: Marieke Elsinga. Also Michiel Jurrjens who finished second raid was allowed to do work and received later also a radio program on the channel.
- 2013–2014: Kai Merckx. Lars Boele who finished second also got his own radio show on the station. Later, Bas van Nimwegen, who was among the final five candidates, received also own program on the channel.
- 2014–2015: Stephan Bouwman.

== Hit ==
- iTunes Top 30: Weekly update of the 30 most downloaded songs through iTunes.
- iTunes Top 500: In 2011 and 2012 Qmusic aired the iTunes Top 500 from 27 to 30 December.
- iTunes Top 100: The Top 500 was shortened in 2013 for the purpose of repeating the Top 500 of the Foute Uur and will be broadcast on 27 December and repeated on 1 January.
- Foute 111: organized annually on the last Friday in June the Foute Party. On this day, was broadcast between 2006 and 2012 the Foute 111 on Qmusic. This list was repeated on New Year's Eve.
- Top 500 van het Foute Uur: Given the success of the Foute Uur from 2013, the Foute 111 was extended to a top 500. The list can be heard in the last week of June on weekdays from 9:00 to 18:00. This list is repeated from 28 to 31 December.
- Q-top 1000: This list from 2005 to 2010 was broadcast in the first week of December. From 2011 these will be broadcast sometime in November.

Qmusic also regularly sends top 500 lists with a specific theme, such as "Top 500 van de zomer", "Top 500 van de 90's", "Top 500 van de 00's", "Top 500 van de 10's." Also "De fluit 40" is broadcast every spring by Mattie & Wietze.

== Actions ==
=== Q-hotel ===
This action is organized every spring since 2011. Three long weekends are Hotel Krasnapolsky renamed the Q-hotel. Listeners can win a stay at the Q-hotel. The DJs of Qmusic than do service under the ministry and have to clean rooms. Additionally occur several artists at the hotel.

After three editions, the Q-hotel in January 2015 has been renamed to 'Q-hotel in the snow' and the Q-hotel relocated to Zell am See in Austria. Instead of three different weekends, the listener will win a four-day trip to Austria. The action has since been no more in the spring, but organized in the winter.

=== The Q-ijsblok ===
Somewhere a big block of ice was put down in the Netherlands. In that ice was the first year a gold block and the other years, the key of a car. Listeners can let SMS know how many seconds they thought the gold block or the key was hitting the ground. The listener who sent the answer that was closest to the actual number of seconds, won the prize.

- 2006, Rotterdam - A gold block worth €25,000, - after 978.844 seconds hit the ground.
- 2009, The Hague - A key of a Porsche hit after 2.69114 million seconds the ground.
- 2011, Tilburg - There were three Mini winning the programs. The keys fell after, respectively, 1.417.853, 2.172.320 and 2.330.242 million seconds.

=== Het Geluid ===
Het Geluid (The Sound) is a competition where the studio has recorded a sound by performing a specific action. That sound than gets played twice every hour. The pricemoney for the contest starts at 2,500 euro. In order to participate, listeners need do apply daily during 1 of the 2 application moments that lasts a few minutes. once around 7:00 and once around 12:00. Every hour, during daytime radio on Monday through Friday (From 7:00 to 19:00), one applicant is called back who than gets 1 change to guess the action performed to produce the sound. Guessing correctly is enough to win the price money however for every wrong answer given the price money increases by 100 euro's. All the wrong answers are added to a public list of given answers. If the sound is not guessed for a long time, the radio station wil start handing out hints. The contest also used to be played on the weekends but this is no longer the case and instead the 'SuperRone' (SuperRound) is now played Monday through Friday, at 7:30. During this round, 3 applicant in a row get the change to guess. That means that if there was no correct answer during the 'SuperRonde', the price money increases 3 times.

This game is usually played from mid-August to mid-November.

Below is a list of past sounds that ended up with a highest price money before being guessed, per year:

Year	Solution	Amount (€)	Source
2007	The collapse of a warning triangle	48,600	
2008 (1st)	The closing of the tab on a pack of sprinkles	57,800	
2008 (2nd)	The extension of a mop	62,400	
2009	Moving back and forth of a computer joystick	57,600	
2010	Replenishing/stacking toilet rolls on a standing toilet roll holder	50.600	
2011	Clicking a phone in a protective case	63,500	
2012	Closing a coffee holder of a coffee maker	37,300	
2013	Hanging the valve clamp back on the rod of a bicycle pump	56,000	
2014	The change-over of the base of a vacuum cleaner mouth	44,800	
2015 (1st)	Pulling a plant out of a jar	51,500	
2015 (2nd)	Refilling a napkin dispenser	46,800	

=== ResQ ===
When this action could listeners call in the help of the presenters of the radio station to help other people with chores such as bringing children to school, mowing grass, ironing, suitcase packing, handing out muffins, fill in for linesman, raids for sidekick to a radio program and cheese at the market. This action was heard from 22 to 28 August 2011.

=== The Voice of Q ===
In The Voice of Q competed all presenters at Qmusic, except Kristel van Eijk and Jeroen Look at the Vegte, on Friday morning around 8:15 to head in the battle for the DJ with the best singing voice. All DJs sang a song and then the listener could vote on the favorite DJ via SMS, then the DJ with the most votes went to the finals. "The Voice of Q" was won by Wietze de Jager.

== Awards ==
Since 2018 the radio station organise an annual award show The Top 40 Awards. The liveshows features different live performances of Dutch artists as well as appearances of international artists. The nominations are based on the Dutch Top 40. In 2021 the British singer Dua Lipa won the most trophies for Best International Artist and Best Live Artist.

== Logos ==
Used from 18 August 2008 to 2 January 2011

Used from 3 January 2011 to 30 August 2015

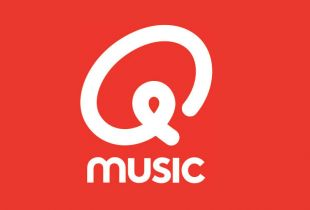
Used since 31 August 2015

== See also ==
- List of radio stations in the Netherlands
