= Radio 538 =

Dutch radio station

Coordinates: 52.225166°N 5.158818°E

- Netherlands
- Frequencies: 102.0–102.9 MHz

Programming
- Format: CHR/Hot AC (1980s-today)

Ownership
- Owner: Talpa Audio; Subsidiary of Talpa Network
- Sister stations: Sky Radio; Radio 10; Radio Noordzee

History
- First air date: 11 December 1992
- Former names: Radio 538 (1992–2012); 538 (2012–2013)

Links
- Webcast: Radio 538; TV 538; 538 Non-Stop; Top40; Hitzone; 538 Ibiza Radio; 538 Dance Department; 538 Party; 538 Verrückte Stunde; Playlist
- Website: www.538.nl

Radio 538 (Dutch: [ˈraːdijoː ˌvɛivdriˈjɑxt]) is a Dutch commercial radio station established in Hilversum, Netherlands, in 1992. It is the second-most listened to radio station in the Netherlands. The name "Radio 538" refers to the wavelength on which Radio Veronica broadcast in the 1970s. The station is owned by Talpa Network.

Radio 538 plays a variety of music from the 1980s to the present, including dance, R&B, pop, and rock. The music selection is primarily based on the Dutch Top 40 chart. During morning and drive times, the station features more talk-intensive programming.

== History ==
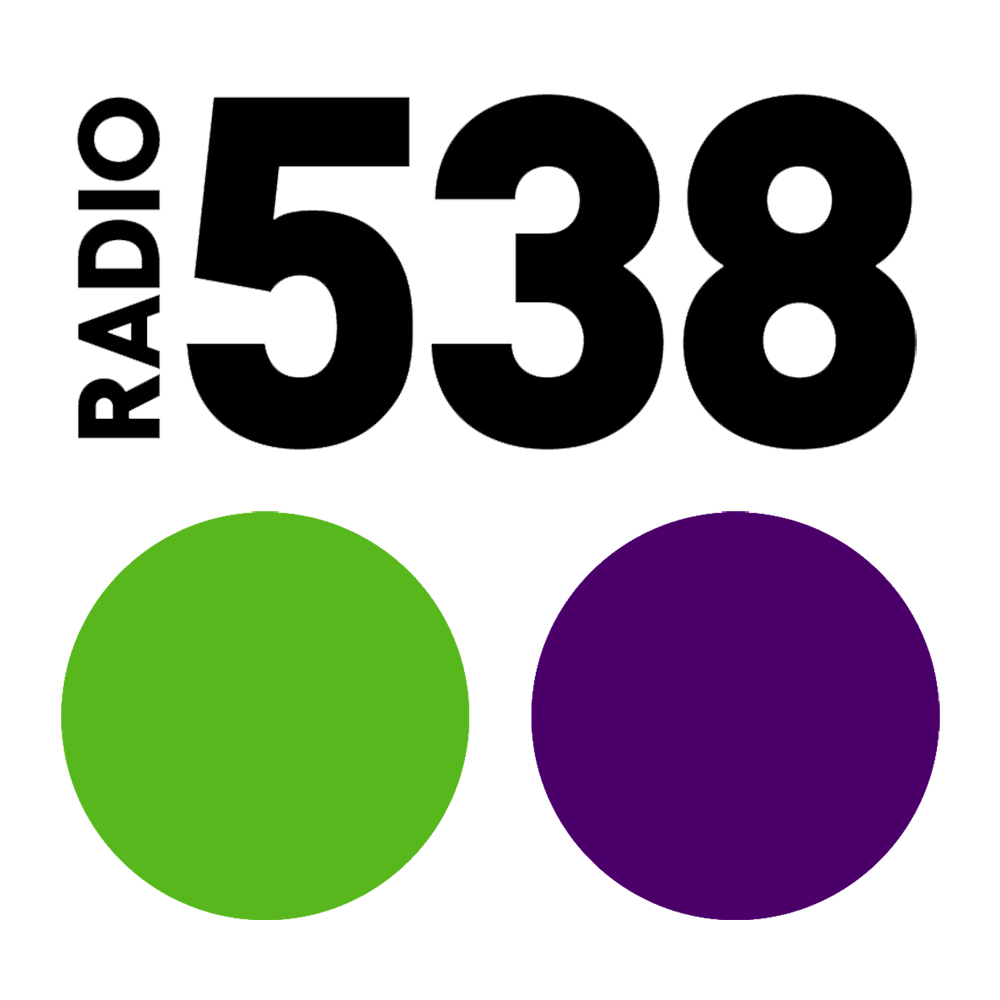
Radio 538 logo used from 2004 to 2012

538 logo used from 2012 to 2014

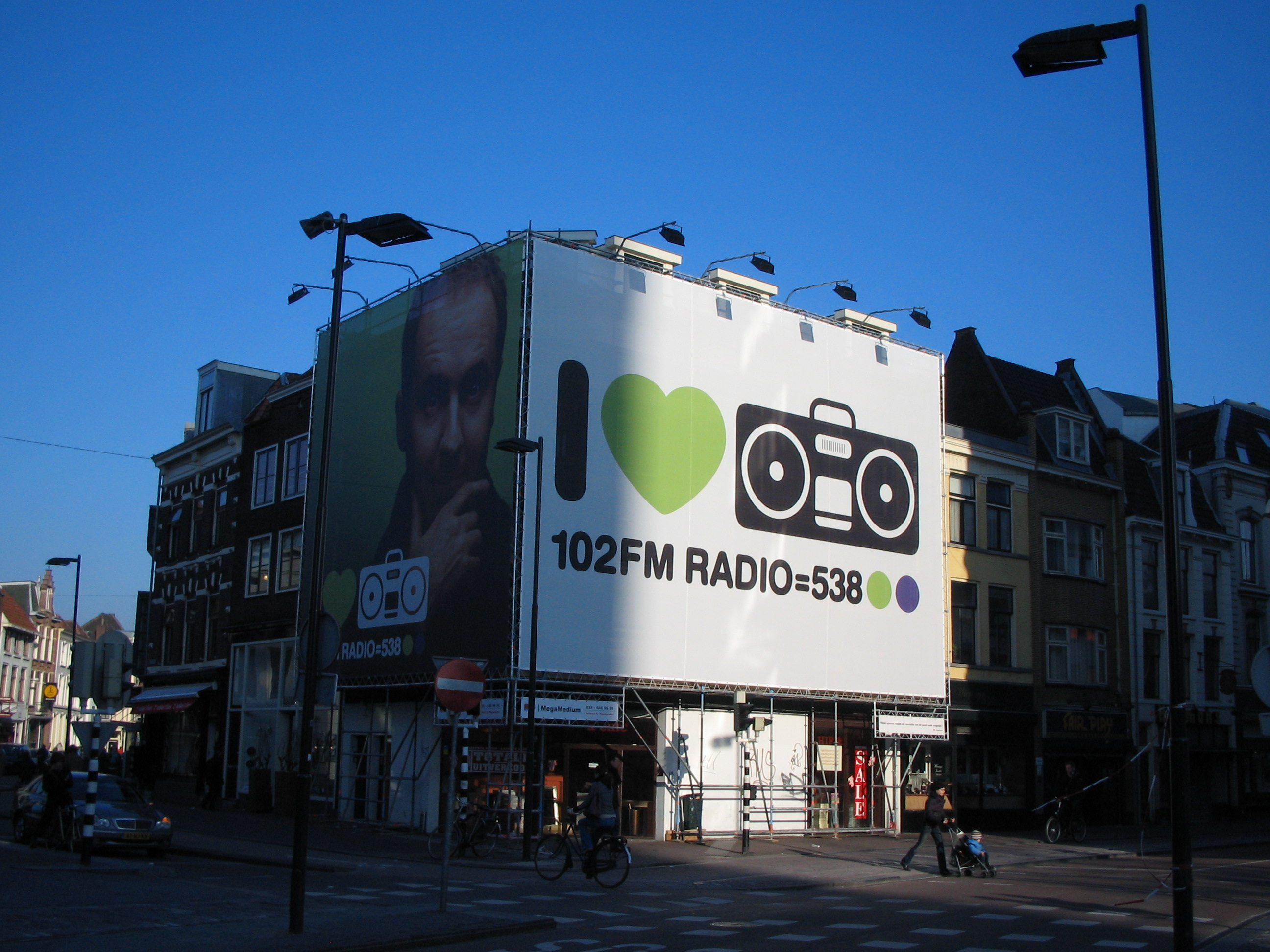
Dutch Radio 538 commercial outing, in 2006 at the Neude in Utrecht

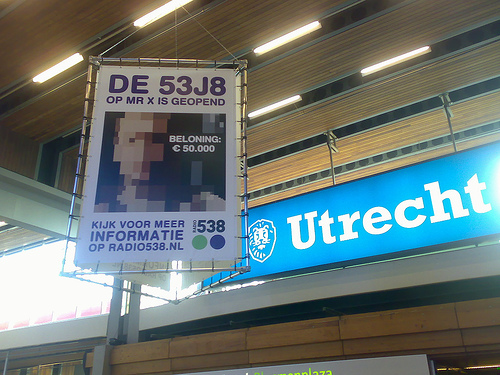
Radio 538 Competition

Radio 538 was established in 1992 as the successor to Sky Hitradio, a sister station of Sky Radio that operated from July to December 11, 1992. It was initiated by a group of former Radio Veronica employees, led by Lex Harding together with Peter de Jager, Rob Out, Ton Lathouwers, Ab Trik and Erik de Zwart. The station began broadcasting on December 11, 1992, from a villa in Bussum. The name “Radio 538” refers to the wavelength (538m: 557 kHz) on which Radio Veronica broadcast in the 1970s. The first presenters included Rick van Velthuysen, Wessel van Diepen, Erik de Zwart, Michael Pilarczyk, Will Luikinga, and Corné Klijn.

Radio 538 initially broadcast from Studio Concordia in Bussum, which was also used by the Veronica program Countdown in the 1980s and 1990s. In the late 1990s, the station moved to a studio complex near the town hall in Hilversum. Since December 1, 2012, the entire 538 Group has been located in the 4400 m^{2} NCRV building at Bergweg 70 in Hilversum.

Initially, from its start in 1992 until 1995, Radio 538 was only available via cable. A request to be allowed to broadcast over the air was rejected at that time. Following a media campaign during which 320,000 signatures were collected Radio 538 acquired its over-the-air frequency in 1995 – or more precisely, a collection of several regional frequencies. In 2003, Radio 538 was granted a new nationwide frequency, 102 MHz (FM). 538 had to pay €57 million for the new frequencies.

In 1995, Lex Harding started TMF (The Music Factory), a TV station, and Erik de Zwart became the new chairman of 538. At the end of 2002, Erik de Zwart left to go to competitor Noordzee FM. Jan-Willem Brüggenwirth became the new chairman. In December 2003 Radio 538 was sold to Advent International, Lex Harding retaining 10% of the shares. In May 2005 Radio 538 was sold in its entirety to Talpa Holding, owned by Dutch media mogul John de Mol. In June 2007 De Mol sold the TV and radio assets of Talpa to RTL Nederland and became shareholder of RTL Nederland.

Radio 538 managed in 10 years to win a substantial market share. In April/May 2004, the station nudged market leader Sky Radio to the throne. Nowadays 538 still competes with NPO Radio 2 and NPO 3FM as the most listened radio station in the Netherlands. The marketing share is between 10 and 12 percent. In 2002, 2004 and 2009 Radio 538 won the Marconi Award for best radio station.

In Flanders, a Flemish version of Radio 538 launched on cable in February 1999, pending the airwave frequency allocation for national commercial radio, which in the late nineties was announced by the Flemish government in 2000. When in 2000 was no clear procedure for a given frequency, Radio 538 withdrew from Flanders.

In 2011 Talpa worked together with Finnish media conglomerate Sanoma to buy the Dutch activities of SBS Broadcasting from German broadcaster ProSiebenSat.1 Media. As part of that deal De Mol sold his shares in RTL Nederland to the RTL Group, retaining the ownership of Radio 538 and its sister station SLAM!FM. In 2014 Radio 538 started with some new programs. De Avondploeg, De Show Zonder Naam and Jurk!FM.

In 2018, the station announced that it would stop carrying the flagship Dutch Top 40 chart. Prior to this, it has been discontinued on FM signal for quite some time. The replacement will be named 538TOP50, and it is compiled based on the selection from 150,000 538Members, airplay on Spotify, YouTube and all the Dutch music stations, alongside Talpa's app JUKE. Dutch Top 40 is now on Qmusic.

== Format ==
In the beginning, the station focused mainly on youth with slogans like, "The station of a young generation". With the advent of disc jockeys such as Edwin Evers, the target group expanded, and the station became wider. A new Alarmschijf and Dancesmash still ran weekly. The listener can also help decide which music is played in the program Maak 't or kraak 't and in past the Top 538. Jingles for the station is recorded by Wessel van Diepen, Rick Romijn and Kimberly van de Berkt.

Nowadays, the station makes commercial hit radio for young people in the broadest sense of the word. The format consists of Top 40 music, dance, Contemporary R&B and "throwbacks", supplemented with information and entertainment by DJs. The morning shows (4am-12pm) feature a mix of current and classic hits. The afternoon and nighttime shows focus more on current hits.

== Frequencies ==
From the launch in 1992 and until 1994, Radio 538 was distributed via cable. In 1994 the station submitted a request for an FM license, however larger stations (such as Radio 538 and SkyRadio) were not granted any FM licenses at that time in favor of smaller, local radio stations. Subsequently, Radio 538 started a media campaign, where a total of 320,000 signatures were collected and in 1995 Radio 538 received license to broadcast on FM on the frequency (103.0 MHz, from Lelystad). On 1 January 1998 the station moved to another frequency package, with different frequencies in different regions.

At the air distribution in 2003 (called Zerobase) Radio 538 received a new nationwide FM network. Radio 538 has since been received in large parts of the Netherlands over the air on the FM band via the following frequencies: 102.1/102.3 MHz North Holland, Groningen 102.2 MHz, 102.3 MHz North Brabant, Gelderland, Limburg, 102.4 MHz Zeeland and North Brabant, Friesland and Utrecht 102.5 MHz, 102.6 MHz Over Ijssel and Gelderland, 102.7 MHz South Holland and Drenthe. Radio 538 promotes its frequencies as "102 FM". Due to the lack of available FM frequencies in the south Limburg region, it was also rebroadcast on 891 kHz mediumwave from a transmitter in Hulsberg.

Radio 538 can also be received via Digitenne and the whole of Europe via satellite and worldwide via the Internet. Previously it was available on mobile phones via UMTS (on the portals of KPN i-mode and Vodafone Live) and in Limburg on AM 891 kHz, 336 m.

Radio 538 also transmits a TMC signal from traffic for route navigation.

From 30 August until 23 November 2011 Radio 538 was broadcast on 106.0 MHz from the tower of Ping FM in the Belgian Lanaken, for the region of Limburg-Maastricht from 12 midnight until 7 pm. Ping FM was eventually ordered by the Vlaamse Regulator voor de Media (Flemish Regulator for the Media) to stop the retransmission of programs of Radio 538. In mid-September 2014 the programs of 538 can be heard via Ping FM. During the day on weekdays, on Thursday, till Sunday also few hours in the evening and on Saturday and Sunday mornings.

In August 2016, it was reported that Radio 538 would cease to broadcast via mediumwave 891 kHz within one month, as it is now well-received via cable, DAB+ and the internet in the south Limburg region. From 26 October 2016 this transmitting is indeed ceased.

== News ==
Every hour also on the half-hour, the news is broadcast, which is provided by the Algemeen Nederland's Persbureau (ANP). The regular newsreaders on Radio 538 are:

- Roelof Hemmen
- Jo van Egmond
- Mart Grol

At other times the news is read by newscasters associated with the ANP.

== Spinoffs ==
In 1999, Radio 538 started the hip-hop and contemporary R&B program Juize, which developed into the radio station Juize.FM on 18 July 2004. Since 1 July 2005, Juize FM is broadcast in most of the Netherlands by cable and has also started running shows with presenters.

In 2011, Radio 538 created a sister television station called TV 538.

== Current DJs ==
- Afrojack
- Armin van Buuren
- Bas Menting
- David Guetta
- Danny Blom
- Lucas & Steve
- Lindo Duvall
- Mark Labrand
- Martin Garrix
- Dennis Ruyer
- Sunnery James & Ryan Marciano
- Tiësto
- Hardwell
- Frank Dane
- Wessel van Diepen
- Ummet Ozcan
- Tim Klijn
- Martijn La Grouw

== Former DJs ==
- Arlo van Sluis
- Anita Doth
- Bart van Leeuwen
- Ben Liebrand
- Colin Banks
- Corné Klijn
- Dennis Verheugd
- Desmond Baidjoe
- DJ Jean
- Erik de Zwart
- Eddy Keur
- Edith den Doosch
- Fabienne de Vries
- Ferry Maat
- Froukje de Both
- Gert-Jan van Ackooij
- Gordon
- Jeroen van Inkel
- Jurjen Gofers
- Jens Timmermans
- Jeroen Nieuwehuizen
- Kees Schilperoort
- Kimberly van de Berkt
- Martijn Kolkman
- Martijn Muijs
- Martijn Biemans
- Menno de Boer
- Menno Barreveld
- Michael Pilarczyk
- Mirella Simoncini
- Niels Hoogland
- Rick van Velthuysen
- Robert Jensen
- Robin Lefeber
- Ruud de Wild
- Sylvana Simons
- Timo Kamst
- Will Luikinga
- Wouter van der Goes
- Niek van der Bruggen

== Events ==
=== Queen's/King's day ===
Until 2011 538 organized annually at Queen's Day a big party on the Museumplein in Amsterdam. Several artists from home and abroad joined there from 12pm and the day was traditionally ended with a grand musical and visual spectacle of well-known DJs. At this event, some 300,000 visitors came. In November 2011 the city of Amsterdam decided that this Queen's Day Party was not allowed to take place in connection with safety. Initially, the 538-party in 2012 at the square near RAI Amsterdam would be held, but in January of that year it was decided to call off the whole party. After an evaluation of the edition in 2012 the city council decided in 2013 to pursue the creation of more scattered, smaller celebrations on Queen's Day. Since King's Day 2014 the big party finds annual place again, but at a different location; in Breda on the Chasséveld.

=== 538 School awards ===
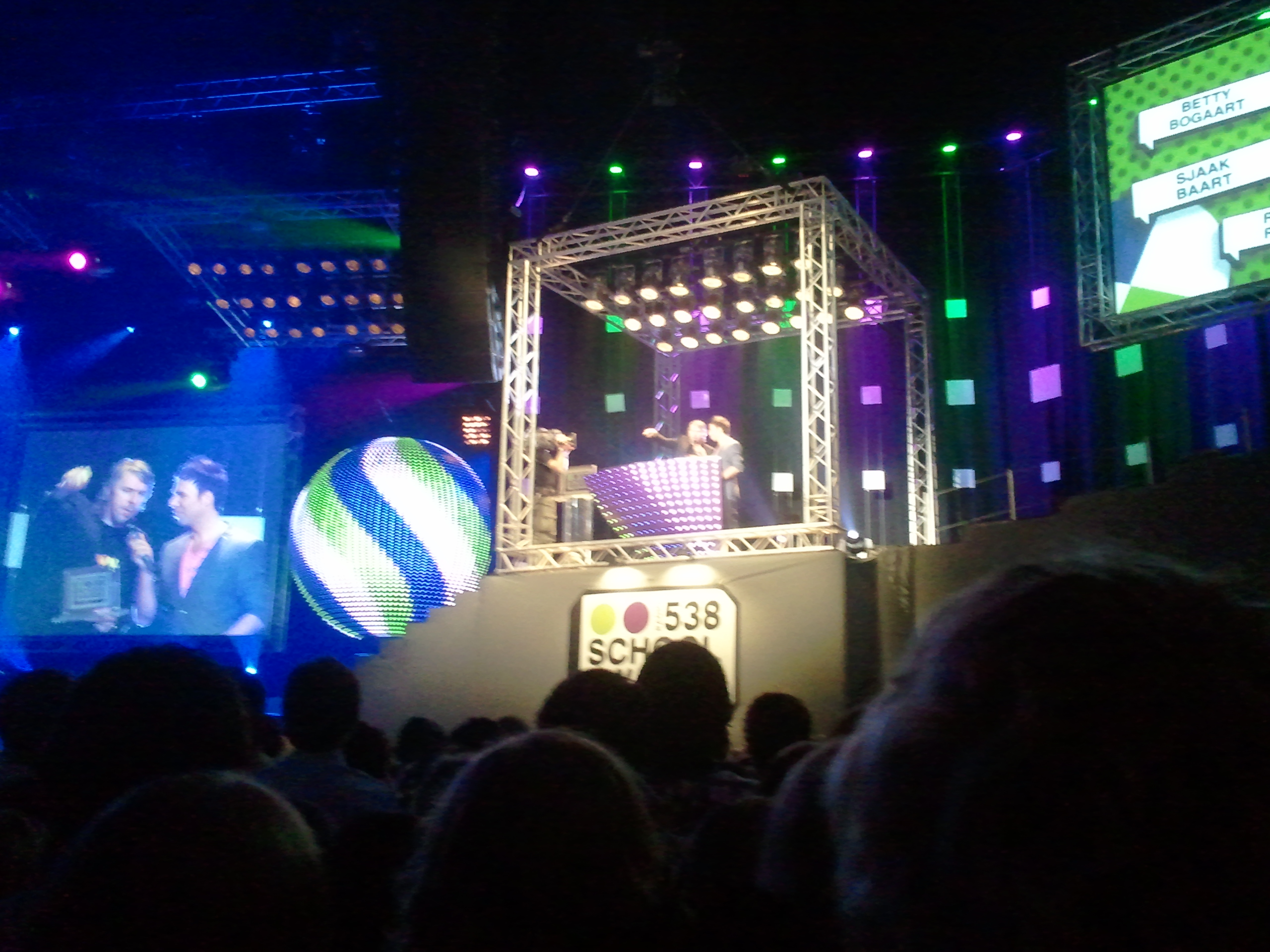
538 Schoolawards ceremony

From 2005 to 2012 538 reached annual the 538 Schoolawards from the best school in the Netherlands. All secondary schools in the Netherlands were able to register for this election, after which the students could vote for their school. The schools with the most votes went together into battle in the final to win a big school and the 538 School awards title. In 2006 the Zwijsen College in Veghel won. In 2007 the prize was won by Adelbert College in Wassenaar, in 2008 by CSG Willem van Oranje in Oud-Beijerland, in 2009 by the Baudartius College in Zutphen, in 2010 by Het Baarnsch Lyceum in Baarn, in 2011 by Sg Spieringshoek in Schiedam and in 2012 by Kalsbeek College in Woerden. From 2013 SLAM!FM took the School Awards over from 538. From now called the SLAM!Schoolawards.

=== Turn up the Beach ===
On 9 July 2011 538 organized, in collaboration with Spa Reine, the beach festival Turn up the Beach. This first edition on the beach of IJmuiden was a great success. All 10,000 tickets were sold. On 14 July 2012 538 organized, in collaboration with Pepsi, the second edition of Turn up the Beach. The third edition of Turn up the Beach was on 13 July 2013.

=== 538 Jingle Ball ===
On 22 December 2012 Radio 538 and RTL 5 organized the price show and music festival 538 JingleBall in the Ziggo Dome. This first edition was a great success. This show was organized because Radio 538 had existed for 20 years in 2012. The second edition of 538 Jingle Ball was on 21 December 2013; this time there was only dance music, run by Dutch DJs. Even before the second edition was held Radio 538 had announced that there would be a third edition of 538 JingleBall. It was held on 19–20 December 2014.

=== 538 Oranjeplein ===
If the Netherlands is joining a UEFA European Championship or FIFA World Cup, Radio 538 organizes the 538 Oranjeplein on the Museumplein in Amsterdam. People can watch all matches of the Dutch national team jointly on large screens at the Museumplein. During the 2014 World Cup the Oranjeplein was however after the eighth finals no longer held since the times of the matches that followed because of the time difference with Brazil were too late and the inconvenience was too large for local residents. During the semi-finals, however, it organized an Oranjeplein again, but in a different location, the Arena Park, next to the Amsterdam Arena.

=== The Voice of Holland ===
Radio 538 broadcasts during The Voice of Holland together with RTL 4 the live shows of the talent.

== Actions ==
=== Hier met je rekening! ===
An annual item Hier met je rekening! (English: Here with your bill!). With this action 538 pays the accounts of listeners. To join it, the listener must send an email with a copy of the bill plus the description and amount of the bill. The account can also be uploaded on the website of Radio 538 using a special form which is for and during the action to find on this site. The entries will be once per hour a name called. The person who is involved should then call to the studio within fifteen minutes, then his or her account is paid (Radio 538 then makes the total amount of the account to the account of the listener so that it can pay on account of this). From 2014 538 also pays bills via Twitter. On the Twitter page of Radio 538 during the action a submitted bill appears and the one who recognizes this bill must then retweet within fifteen minutes, after which the bill will be paid. This action takes place twice a year, in January, after the Christmas holidays and in August/September, after the summer holidays, because people in these two holidays to spend much money on groceries for Christmas dinner (in the holidays) or souvenirs and trips during the holidays (in the Summer) and then often left with little money to pay for other often high bills that often lie thereby. Radio 538 assists over here to pay them a hand by these accounts.

=== 53J8 ===
Here there is a secret person, better known as Mr. X that passes through the land.

Every day, he is at a different location. On which location the listener gets little tips on the radio. The listener who finds on this basis Mr. X, receives 50 000, - euro note. If he was somewhere he sticks a sticker to and tells at the end of the day where he has been.

=== 538 voor War Child ===
538 voor War Child was an action that took place from 25 March to 1 April 2011, from 9 to 16 March 2012 and from 22 to 29 March 2013.

During the action the money was collected for War Child, an organization designed to help children cope with their war trauma. Listeners of the radio station came up with the stunts that were done during the week of action, and that money was raised. Every day was 538 with a mobile studio on a different place in the Netherlands.

The places where 538 in 2012 was a guest was: Maastricht, 's-Hertogenbosch, Nijmegen, Hilversum, Alphen aan den Rijn, Meppel, Leeuwarden and Groningen. Performances were given by, among other Pearl Jozefzoon, Glennis Grace, Hardwell, Ben Saunders, Iris Kroes, VanVelzen, Ferry Corsten, Destine, Waylon, Di-rect, Charly Luske, Racoon, Lange Frans and Xander de Buisonjé.

In 2013, 538 was a guest in: Groningen, Heerenveen, Alkmaar, Gouda, Bergen op Zoom, Veenendaal, Arnhem and 's-Hertogenbosch.

On 1 May 2013 it was announced that 538 stops 538 for War Child.

=== Win met de zin ===
Win met de zin (English: Win with the sentence) is a game that was first played on 25 August 2014. From this year, this game is played twice a year, in February and August. In this game listeners are required to guess the names of four celebrity voices. Each will say a part of the sentence "The Beat / Of The Moment / Radio / 538" (in 2017 "Eén station / Alle hits / Radio / 538" and from 2018 "Win Met De Zin / = 538 / Radio / = 538"). The starting price is €1000 and for each failed attempt €100 was added to the prize fund. The jackpot is won by the listener who does well all four votes. Then start a new round. The game is played every hour between 7:00 and 19:00.

== Owners ==
Radio 538 was founded in 1992 by Lex Harding. In 1995 Lex Harding founded the TV channel TMF (The Music Factory). Both stations aired from the same building and worked together a lot. Erik de Zwart became the new director of Radio 538. In late 2002 Erik de Zwart moved to Talpa Radio International.

In December 2003, Radio 538 was sold to the investment fund Advent International. Lex Harding retained 10% of the shares.

On 23 May 2005 Radio 538 was fully acquired by Talpa by John de Mol and Lex Harding took definitely goodbye. Together with Radio 10 Gold, which already owned by Talpa, Radio 538 was brought under the management of Talpa Radio (since 2006: Talpa Media). Until that moment, Talpa, next to Radio 10 Gold, also owned Noordzee FM. Because it was not allowed under the provisions of the 2003 frequency to two general, possess national commercial radio broadcasters, Talpa was forced to sell Noordzee FM. The Flemish company De Persgroep took Noordzee FM and renamed the station few months later to Q-music. De Persgroep does not have to pay anything for Noordzee FM to Talpa.

On 1 October 2007 Radio 538, along with various programs from the television channel Tien was taken over by RTL Nederland. On 1 January 2012 Radio 538 was, like its sister stations Radio 10 Gold and Slam!FM, taken over again by Talpa Holding. This was a result of a transaction between RTL Group and Talpa Holding, which has been an exchange of shares and sale to the order. RTL Group owned back all shares in RTL Nederland Holding since 1 January 2015, while Talpa became again the 100% owner of Radio 538. All this is a result of participation by Talpa Holding in SBS Broadcasting.

== Sister stations ==
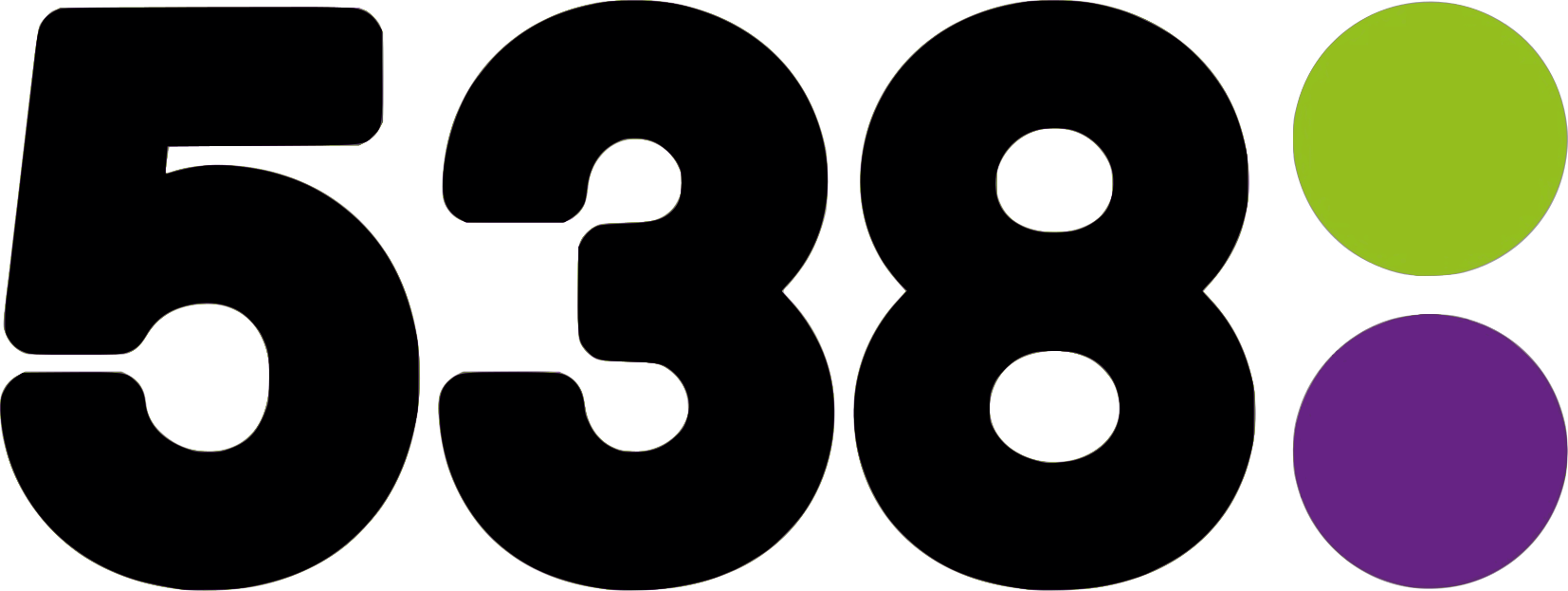
TV 538 logo

TV 538 is a television channel which started in 2011 as a TV channel of Radio 538. In addition, the station has a number of digital channels that link to Radio 538, like 53L8, 538NL and 538IBIZA.

== See also ==
- List of radio stations in the Netherlands
