= Erik de Zwart =

Dutch broadcaster and former DJ

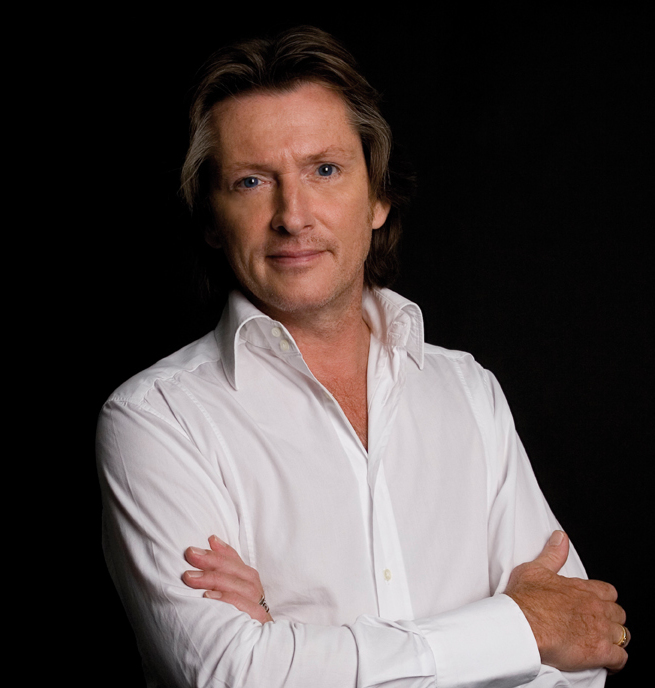
- de Zwart in 2009
- Born: 16 June 1957 (age 68); Amsterdam, Netherlands
- Occupations: broadcaster former D.J. and V.J. media entrepreneur

Erik de Zwart (born 16 June 1957 in Amsterdam) is a Dutch broadcaster, former D.J., former Music Box, The Music Factory and MTV V.J. and media entrepreneur.

== Career ==
He was co-founder and shareholder of Radio 538 (1992) and The Music Factory (1995).

Presently, Erik is chairman of Stichting Nederlandse Top 40, the body that owns and exerts all broadcasting and publishing rights of the Dutch Top 40, the nation's flagship music chart and its spin-offs.

Among his current major investments and interests is the media technology company Mobilaria / Tunin.FM that offers mobile streaming audio in high quality over small bandwidth GPRS mobile networks using highly advanced compression technologies.

As of April 2008, Erik de Zwart also is the station voice of Radio Veronica, the present day successor of the legendary offshore pirate station under the same name.

De Zwart is the Dutch dubbing voice and narrator of the children's television series Thomas and Friends (Dutch title: Thomas de Stoomlocomotief).

He was one of the contestants in the twenty-first season of the Dutch television series Wie is de Mol?. He was eliminated in the second episode of the show.
