= John de Mol Jr. =

Dutch media proprietor (born 1955)

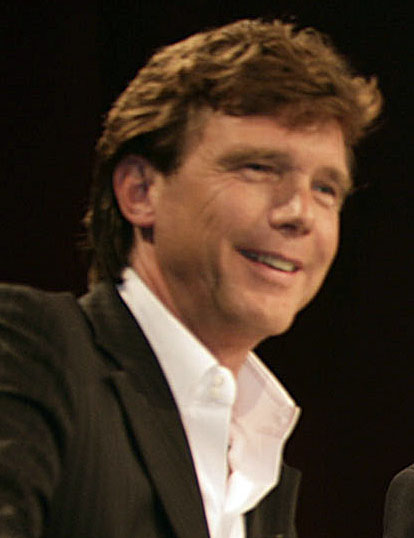
- John de Mol Jr. in 2006
- Born: Johannes Hendrikus Hubert de Mol Jr. 24 April 1955 (age 71); The Hague, Netherlands
- Occupations: Businessman; corporate director; television producer; film producer
- Years active: 1973–present
- Known for: Founding Endemol; Founding Talpa Media; Creating Big Brother; Creating The Voice
- Spouses: Willeke Alberti (m. 1976; div. 1980) Els de Mol (m. 1986)
- Children: Johnny de Mol
- Relatives: Linda de Mol (sister)

Johannes Hendrikus Hubert "John" de Mol Jr. (born 24 April 1955) is a Dutch media proprietor. De Mol is one of the men behind production companies Endemol and Talpa. He created the reality television formats Big Brother, Star Academy and The Voice, and the game shows Fear Factor, Deal or No Deal and The Floor.

Forbes estimated him to be worth about US$1.8 billion in 2023.

== Endemol ==
De Mol acquired his fortune producing television programmes. From 1997 to 1999, he developed the popular reality television series Big Brother with his production company, John de Mol Produkties. In 1994, his company merged with Joop van den Ende TV-Producties into Endemol, but it still functioned on its own. He produced Fear Factor, Love Letters, 1 vs. 100 and Deal or No Deal (Miljoenenjacht) for Endemol. De Mol sold his share of Endemol in 2000 to Telefónica but continued to serve as creative director until 2004. In 2005, he was listed on the Forbes Magazine list of the 500 Richest People in the World.

=== Utopia ===
In January 2014, Endemol launched a new reality TV program called Utopia, featuring 15 people given the aim of building up a new community living on a rural property.

== Talpa Media Holding ==
De Mol founded his own television station. The proposed name, Tien (Dutch for 10), was disputed by competitor SBS Broadcasting, owner of the TV10 brand. The channel had to launch under the Talpa brand, Latin for mole which translates to mol in Dutch. Later the name dispute was ended, which resulted in the rebranding of Talpa to Tien.

The station scored bad ratings, despite scooping the rights of the Eredivisie football league. In 2007, de Mol decided to close down Tien and sold the channel to RTL Nederland, retaining a share in that company. De Mol also sold Radio 538 to RTL Nederland, which he acquired in 2005. Talpa remained the name of the holding company managing De Mol's assets and the production company which continued to produce several programmes for the RTL network, including the highly successful Ik Hou van Holland.

=== Buying SBS ===
In 2011, Talpa worked together with Finnish media conglomerate Sanoma to buy the Dutch activities of SBS Broadcasting from German broadcaster ProSiebenSat.1 Media. As part of that deal, De Mol sold his shares in RTL Nederland to the RTL Group, retaining the ownership of Radio 538 and its sister stations Radio 10 Gold and SLAM!FM.

=== The Voice ===
In 2010, a new reality competition series, The Voice of Holland, was launched by de Mol. It was a large success in the Netherlands and the formula was sold to several other countries around the globe. The Voice (of America) launched on NBC on 27 April 2011 with De Mol and Mark Burnett as executive producers. In The Voice, the singing auditions are 'blind': the jury is turned with their back to the competitors. Once having 'selected' by pushing a button, the juror turns towards the competitor. This concept, the creation of De Mol and Dutch singer VanVelzen, makes it "all about the voice." After these blind auditions, the coaches train their competitors through knock-out battles and public voting rounds until there is one competitor left, who will be named as 'The Voice'.

=== The Voice controversy ===
In 2022, YouTube show BOOS aired an episode, in which four members of 'The Voice' were accused of abuse of power and sexual misconduct. One of the men accused was De Mols's brother-in-law, Jeroen Rietbergen. The episode ended with journalist Tim Hofman interviewing De Mol, who had just finished watching the first part of the episode. When asked by Hofman what the future would hold for The Voice, De Mol replied ″Do not wait. Do not be afraid. You have to open your mouth. Only then can we help you … Women apparently have a kind of shame, I don’t know what it is, but I would like to delve into it″.

After the episode went online, De Mol was accused of victim-blaming, particularly by his company's female employees. A page-wide advertisement published on Algemeen Dagblad stated the following: "Dear John, It’s not the women. Greetings, the women in your company″. De Mol later said he was moved by this advert and spoke to the women organized it, to understand their anger and disappointment, adding "It has become clear to me now that women will not come forward if the culture in a company is not perceived as being sufficiently safe. I blame myself for the fact that this is apparently the case in my company, and I am 100% committed to changing this.”

== Personal life ==
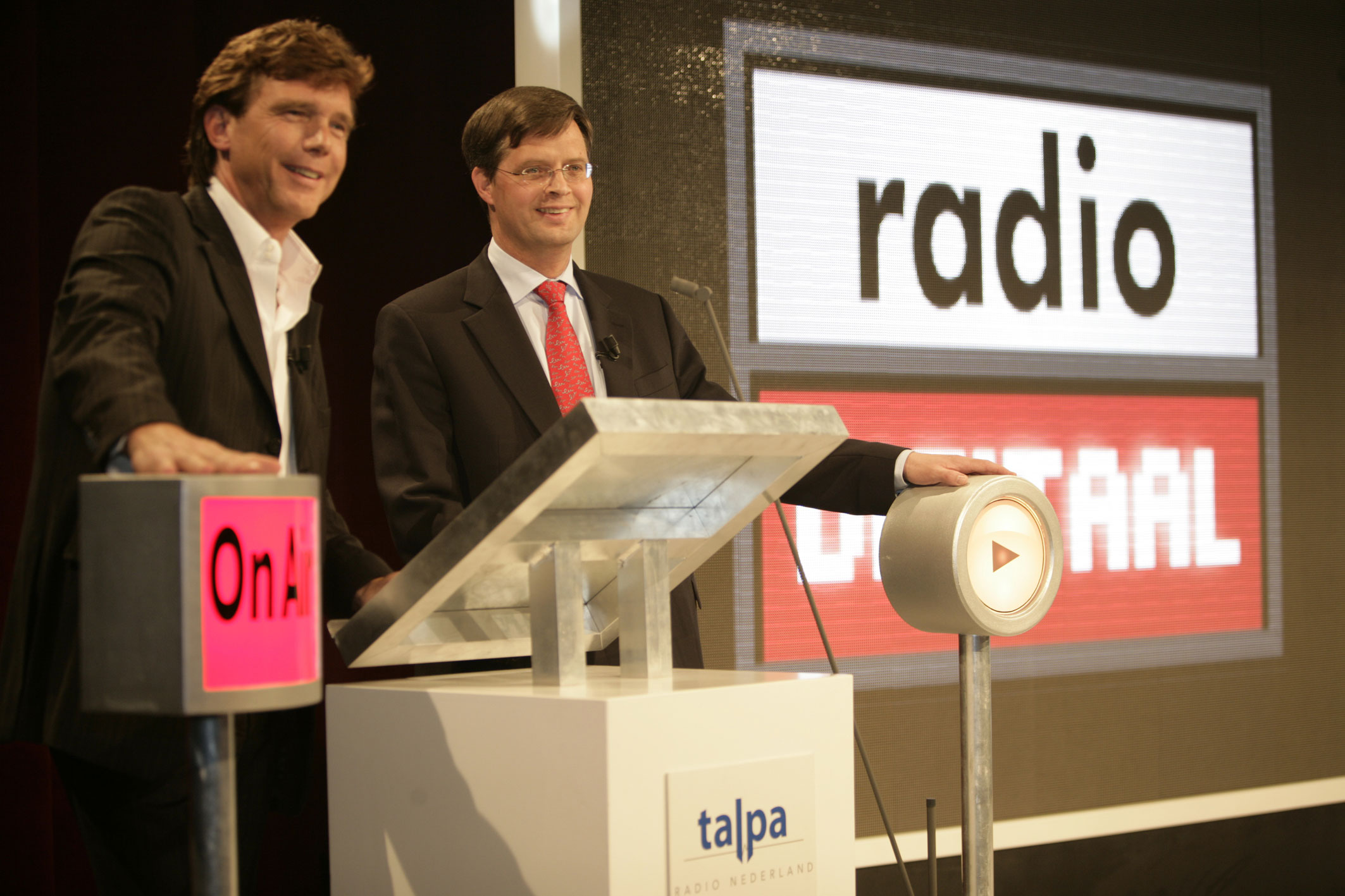
The launch of a commercial online radio platform by John de Mol Jr. (left) and Jan Peter Balkenende

De Mol is the son of John de Mol Sr., who was the general manager of Dutch station Radio Noordzee and was known as the Dutch Frank Sinatra. John's sister, broadcaster and actress Linda de Mol, presents or appears in some of Endemol's programmes, including the original Dutch version of Deal or No Deal, Miljoenenjacht (Hunt for Millions). De Mol Jr. was formerly married to singer and actress Willeke Alberti. The actor Johnny de Mol is their son. From 1980 to 1984, Luv' singer Marga Scheide was his partner. Outside of television, De Mol controls a large private equity fund which, at one time, owned significant shares of car manufacturer Spyker Cars and telecommunications company Versatel.

== See also ==
- List of Dutch by net worth

== Sources ==
- , forbes.com; Nov 2023.
