= HitRadio Veronica =

Yorin FM
- Netherlands
- Broadcast area: Netherlands
- Frequencies: 828 kHz; 103.8/104.1 MHz; 12.574 GHz horizontal (Astra 19.2°E)

Programming
- Format: Pop

Ownership
- Owner: Holland Media Group (1995–2006)

History
- First air date: 1 September 1995
- Last air date: 18 April 2006
- Former call signs: Holland FM, HitRadio Holland FM, HitRadio 1224, HitRadio Veronica (1995–1998), Veronica FM (1998–2001)

Links
- Website: http://www.arrow.nl/caz

HitRadio Veronica (later Veronica FM, Yorin FM) was a Dutch commercial radio station that was created when the public broadcaster Veronica Omroep Organisatie left the public system in August 1995, creating the Holland Media Groep with CLT (RTL).

== History ==
In 1994 Veronica bought the station Holland FM and rebranded it into Hitradio Holland FM and later Hitradio 1224. Most of known Veronica DJs switched to Hitradio 1224.

HitRadio Veronica has broadcast on 828 kHz and 1224 kHz from 1995 till 1996, the slogan was De hits van gisteren en het beste van nu.

The station transmitted the show Kinkel Jeroen van Inkel. Jensen presented also Escapades Evening with Robert Jensen, and The Shack Friday with Robert Jensen and Edwin Evers had a place in programming. Other well-known DJs at the station were Gijs Staverman, Edwin Zoo and Kas van Iersel. Rob Stenders and Martijn Krabbé were in 1995 and 1996 to hear a short time HitRadio Veronica.

=== Veronica FM ===
When HitRadio Veronica got FM-frequencies in the Western region of the Netherlands the name changed also.

From 1 January 1998, the station changed name again. Because the station had FM frequencies, the station was renamed Veronica FM. The broadcasts on the AM frequencies 828 kHz and 1224 kHz were discontinued a short time later. The station had a limited air coverage of 15 percent. The main competitor Radio 538, had a much greater range than Veronica FM. Slogans of the station were "The new sound of your radio" and "The No. 1 hitradio".

=== Yorin FM ===
When Veronica in 2000 decided to sell his shares in HMG, it was agreed that the name Veronica could be used on radio and television for a year. After this period it must to be renamed. First, it was decided to use the name Me, but was dropped after clothing chain WE threatened to sue because the names were too similar. Eventually, they chose Yorin. On April 2, 2001, the radio was renamed and later the television. The slogan was transformed after the name change to Yorin FM to "Your number one hitradio".

Disc jockeys who at that time were to listen to the station, included Robert Jensen, Gijs Staverman, Wouter van der Goes and Michael Pilarczyk. Also had Formula 1 commentator Olav Mol, TV presenter Beau van Erven Thorns and actor Joost Buitenweg programs Yorin FM. In 2003, left the program leader and DJ Robert Jensen and his team at North Sea FM.

Of radio listening figures did not meet the desired objectives. Therefore, Yorin FM decided in June 2004 to change course and to distinguish it from other radio stations. They did this by only turning pop and rock hits, in a mix of both older and newer songs. She also drew among others Rob Stenders, Henkjan Smits and later Henk Westbroek and Robert Jensen (again) to attract listeners. This 'new' Yorin FM began Stenders Early on 14 June 2004 at the European Championship. In August 2004 they came live from Athens to defeat the Olympics.

Yorin FM conducted several projects with high prices; so the station gave twice a year "free" living in a villa in the Algarve away. It was also regularly to the format doctored, until there is also again dance and urban was rotated at a given time. Despite everything, not Yorin FM managed to raise the listening figures.

In August 2005 the television Yorin was renamed RTL 7. Initially the name Yorin FM persist. Since January 2006 Yorin FM was taken over by SBS Broadcasting Netherlands, after which it was renamed on April 18, 2006, was Caz !. At that time, the station also got a new format and, with few exceptions, other disc jockeys.

== Caz! ==
Caz! is a Dutch commercial radio station that started on April 18, 2006, at 06.00 using the frequencies formerly used by Yorin FM. Due to disappointing results, RTL Group sold Yorin FM in 2006 to SBS Broadcasting who relaunched it under the Caz! brand. SBS chose the name Caz! from a list of hundreds of potential names. The name Caz! was eventually chosen because it contains no abbreviations.

Caz! targets the 20 - 34 age group with Pop, Dance and Urban music. The station is noted for its non-stop music programmes played mostly over the weekend. These programmes include "Welcome to your weekend mix!", "Blended" and "Non Stop".

In May 2007, SBS Broadcasting sold the Caz! radio station to Arrow Classic Rock. Arrow started broadcasting their own station on the Caz! FM radio frequencies on 30 June 2007. Hence, as of this date, Caz!, will not be available over the air although from 10 July 2008 till 10 March 2009 Caz! had broadcast on the 828 kHz AM from a transmitter in the Netherlands at Heinenoord, south of Rotterdam. On this transmitter Arrow Classic Rock is now broadcasting from 11 March 2009.

There is however, the option to listen to Caz! via their official website.

== Caz! DJs ==
- Jeroen Kijk in de Vegte
- Albert-Jan Sluis
- Maurice Verschuuren
- Jurjen Gofers
- Koen van Huijgevoort
- Ferry van der Heijden
- Joey Hereman
- Rinse Blanksma
- Martin Pieters
- Joshua Walters
- DJ Jean

== See also ==
- List of radio stations in the Netherlands
