= Lingo (American game show) =

American television game show

- Poster for the 2023 revival
- Genre: Game show
- Created by: Ralph Andrews
- Written by: Saul Urbonas (1987); Barry Cuff (1987–88); Niki Xenophontos (2023)
- Directed by: Geoff Theobald (1987); Michael Watt (1987–88); Dirk-Jan van Heusden (2002); John Vogt (2002–03); R. Brian DiPirro (2003–07); Alan Carter (2007); Julian Smith (2023)
- Presented by: Michael Reagan; Ralph Andrews; Chuck Woolery; Bill Engvall; RuPaul
- Starring: Dusty Martell; Margaux MacKenzie; Stacey Hayes; Shandi Finnessey; Gwendolyn Osborne
- Announcer: Randy Thomas; Stacey Hayes; Sylvia Villagran
- Countries of origin: Canada; United States
- Original language: English
- No. of seasons: 1 (Syndication); 6 (GSN, 2002–07); 1 (GSN, 2011); 2 (CBS, 2023–24)
- No. of episodes: 130 (Syndication); 345 (GSN, 2002–07); 40 (GSN, 2011); 25 (CBS, 2023–24)

Production
- Executive producers: Gary Bernstein (1987); Larry Hovis (1987); Ralph Andrews (1987–88); William C. Elliott (1987–88); Phil Gurin (2002–07); Marc Jansen (2002–07); Harry de Winter (2002–04); Barry Poznick (2011); John Stevens (2011); Charles Steenveld (2011); J.P. Williams (2011); RuPaul Charles (2023); Layla Smith (2023); Ed de Burgh (2023); Paul Wright (2023); Jilly Pearce (2023)
- Producers: Lou Valenzi (1987); Geoff Theobald (1987); Patricia Evans (1987–88); Gerda Boerboom (2002); Nelsje Musch-Elzinga (2002); Troy A. Norton (2005–07); Bill Engvall (2011)
- Running time: 22–26 minutes (1987–2011); 43 minutes (2023–24)
- Production companies: Ralph Andrews Productions (1987–88); Bernstein-Hovis Productions (1987–88); Laurelwood Entertainment (2002–07); IDTV International (2002–04); All3Media International (2005–07); Game Show Network Originals (2002–04); Zoo Productions (2011); Triple Brew Media (2023–24); RuCo Inc. (2023–24)

Original release
- Network: Syndication
- Release: September 28, 1987 – March 25, 1988
- Network: Game Show Network
- Release: August 5, 2002 – June 29, 2007
- Release: June 6 – August 1, 2011
- Network: CBS
- Release: January 11, 2023 – September 20, 2024

Lingo is an American television game show with multiple international adaptations. Contestants compete to decode five-letter words given the first letter, similarly to Jotto. In most versions of the show, successfully guessing a word also allows contestants to draw numbers to fill in a Bingo card.

Four Lingo series have aired in the United States. The first was aired in daily syndication from September 28, 1987 to March 25, 1988, and taped at the BCTV studios in the Vancouver suburb of Burnaby, British Columbia; initially hosted by Michael Reagan, series creator Ralph Andrews took over beginning in February 1988. On August 5, 2002, Game Show Network (GSN) premiered a revival of Lingo, which was hosted by Chuck Woolery and ran for six seasons through 2007. On June 6, 2011, GSN premiered a second revival hosted by comedian Bill Engvall, running for one season.

On February 11, 2022, CBS announced that it had ordered a primetime revival of Lingo, with RuPaul as host and executive producer, which premiered on January 11, 2023.

== Gameplay ==
=== 1987 version ===
An example of a Lingo puzzle. Here, the mystery word is "BAGEL", solved in only three guesses.

Two teams of two contestants, one of them usually a returning champion, compete. To start the game, each team receives a randomly generated "Lingo" card, similar in manner to a bingo card. Seven spaces are filled in, with one team playing with odd numbers and the other with even numbers.

The team is then given the first letter of a five-letter mystery word and must make attempts at guessing the word by spelling it out. To assist in figuring out the word, each letter lights up. A letter that turns red is in the mystery word and in the right place, one that is yellow is in the mystery word but in the wrong place, and one that does not light up is not in the mystery word at all. If the team did not come up with the right word on the first try, they were shown which letters were correctly placed as well as those in the word but not correctly placed. A team has five turns in which to guess the word.

Control passes to the opposing team if the team in control either fails to guess before five seconds expire; makes an invalid guess (a misspelled word, a proper noun, a contraction, a hyphenate, or a word not five letters in length), or guesses incorrectly on the fifth turn. Passing control to the opposing team also reveals another letter in the word, unless doing so would fill in the word completely. If the opposing team still fails to guess, then the word is discarded and a new one is generated.

After correctly guessing a word, the team that did so got a chance to draw two balls from inside their hopper, with each teammate drawing one. Each hopper contained balls that had the uncovered positions on the Lingo board printed on them, as well as three gold balls and three red balls. The gold balls awarded prizes to the team if they were drawn, and the team had to win the game to claim them. The red balls, if drawn, caused the team to lose control.

Play continued until one of the teams made a Lingo (five numbers consecutively aligned either horizontally, vertically, or diagonally), with that team winning the game and $250 plus whatever prizes they had earned with the gold Lingo balls (if any). Later on in the run, the cash prize awarded was based on the type of Lingo that was made. A horizontal or vertical Lingo paid $500, a diagonal Lingo $1,000, and a “Double Lingo”, which happened when one Lingo ball completed two lines, was worth $2,000. The gold prize balls were eventually done away with as well.

=== 2002 version ===
Gameplay on the GSN version was largely similar to that of its 1987 counterpart, though with several changes.

To start each game, ten random numbers on each team’s Lingo card were covered; unlike the original series, the board did not use the letters in "Lingo" for positioning. The first team to correctly guess a word was awarded 25 points and the opportunity to draw two balls. Inside the hoppers were numbered balls corresponding with the numbers on the Lingo card as well as the red balls, which host Chuck Woolery referred to as "stoppers" in a nod to his former game show Scrabble. Completing a Lingo was worth 50 points, and once a team completed a Lingo they received a new card with ten numbers covered.

In the second round, the point values were doubled (each correct word was worth 50 points, while a Lingo was worth 100 points), and three balls with question marks on them were placed in the hoppers, which could be used to cover any number on a team's card when drawn. The team with the most points at the end of this round won the game and moved on to play Bonus Lingo.

In the event of a tie, a seven-letter word would be displayed and the letters filled in one at a time, with all four contestants able to buzz in. The first one to guess the word won the game for his/her team.

=== Bonus round ===
==== No Lingo (1987 version) ====
The No Lingo board used the same pattern of marked numbers for each game.

The bonus round of the 1987 version had the exact opposite objective of the front game, with the champion team trying to avoid making a Lingo.

To start the game, the team was shown a Lingo board with even numbers on it. Sixteen of the twenty-five numbers were covered to start, and the team was staked with $500. They were then shown a word, with the first letter and one of the other four displayed. As in the main game, they had five chances to guess the word. For each chance it took, the team would have to draw one Lingo ball from the hopper. If the team did not guess the word after five chances, the correct word was revealed and two additional Lingo balls (a total of seven) would need to be drawn.

This time the hopper contained balls with every even-numbered Lingo space on them, regardless of whether they appeared on the board or not, and one gold ball. For each draw, the host would call out the letter and number on the ball, and as long as the ball did not have a number on it that would complete a Lingo, play continued. If none of the drawn balls completed a Lingo, or if they drew the gold ball from the hopper at any time, their winnings doubled.

The round was played until a Lingo was made or the team survived five words without making one. Before each word, the team was given a chance to stop with their winnings or continue playing, as making a Lingo would end the game and the team would lose any money earned to that point. If they managed to survive five draws without a Lingo, their total cash prize would be $16,000. Champions initially competed for up to three days, and for each return trip to the No Lingo round their starting stake was doubled; a maximum payout of $32,000 would be available for a second trip and $64,000 for a third trip.

Coinciding with the change in scoring in the front game, the bonus round rules were adjusted. The cash prize awarded in the front game became the starting stake for the No Lingo round, and champions were allowed to stay on for a maximum of four matches or until they lost the bonus round twice.

==== Bonus Lingo (2002 version) ====
The first season Bonus Lingo board.

In the 2002 version, the winning team had two minutes to guess as many five-letter mystery words as possible. Two letters were initially revealed in each word, one of which was always the first letter. If the team failed to guess a word in five tries, it was revealed and the team moved on to the next word. The team won $100 for each correctly guessed word, up to $1,000 for ten words.

A Lingo card was then revealed with thirteen numbers marked off. The hopper contained twelve balls, one for each uncovered space on the board, and the team drew a ball for each mystery word successfully guessed in the first half of Bonus Lingo. Forming a Lingo won the team a $4,000 prize package consisting of an Argus digital camera, a Borders gift card, a Croton watch, and a Cassiopeia EM-500 Pocket PC plus the money earned in the first half of Bonus Lingo.

From season two onward, the team was also given "bonus letters": one for winning the main game, and an additional one for each Lingo they had scored. The team could elect to use a bonus letter at any time to fill in the first unrevealed letter in a word, even if doing so would reveal the word. In addition, the layout of the Bonus Lingo card was changed so that twelve numbers were marked off and a Lingo could be achieved in only one draw. Doing so awarded a large prize: a trip plus $5,000 cash in seasons two and three, $10,000 cash in season four, and a jackpot that began at $10,000 and increased by $1,000 per day it went unclaimed in seasons five and six. Throughout the series' run, the team won $5,000 for achieving a Lingo in two or more draws, or $100 per correctly guessed word if they failed to do so. Unlike the 1987 version, this version did not feature returning champions.

An example of the Bonus Lingo board layout in season two. On this board, the 16 is required to win on the first draw.

==== Tournaments and special episodes ====
GSN held a tournament of champions with particularly successful contestants from its second and third seasons. Instead of playing Bonus Lingo in the final tournament episode, a third round was played in which points tripled, meaning teams earned 75 points for a completed word and 150 points for a Lingo. The question mark balls from the second round carried over to the third round. At the end of the show, the team with the most points won a Suzuki Verona for each teammate.

A special episode that aired on April Fool's Day in 2003 had the entire roster of GSN's six original show hosts together playing for charity. While Woolery hosted, Mark L. Walberg (Russian Roulette) and Marc Summers (WinTuition) played against Kennedy (Friend or Foe?) and Graham Elwood (Cram), with Walberg and Summers shutting them out 500–0. The sixth host, Todd Newton (Whammy! The All-New Press Your Luck), served as the show's announcer.

=== 2011 version ===
Logo used for the 2011 version

Each team begins the game with nine numbers marked off on their own board. At the start of the show, a member of each team draws a Lingo ball, and the team with the higher number gets to play first. Unlike in previous versions, the number balls are on a rack and not in a hopper. If the ball is a number ball, it is also marked off as the tenth number on the team's board. If the ball is a stopper or a prize ball, no number is marked off. Also unlike the previous versions, the host gives a clue as to the word's meaning. Correct letters turn green instead of red.

Correctly identifying words in round one earns $100, $200 in round two, and $500 in round three. Completing a five-number Lingo awards the same payouts as correct words in each round. When a new board is issued to a team, nine numbers are pre-marked. Three words each are played in rounds one and three, while four words are played in round two. The team with the most money after round three wins the game, keeps the money, and plays Bonus Lingo. If a team is mathematically unable to catch up, the game ends once the balls have been drawn for the last word.

In Bonus Lingo, the winning team has 90 seconds to correctly guess five words, receiving two letters in each word. The team wins the identical amount earned in the main game for the first correct word and that amount is then doubled for each additional correct word until the fifth one, which earns the team $100,000. The amount earned in Bonus Lingo is added to the team's total winnings.

=== 2023 version ===
The 2023 revival does not use any bingo mechanics and consists only of word guessing. Each attempt on a word lasts ten seconds instead of five. Each episode features two semi-final matches between two teams each (starting in season 2, the first game has a defending championship team defending their title), consisting of the following rounds:

- In the first round, each team plays three five-letter words. Guessing a word correctly on the first try (called a "Golden Guess") earns $5,000, with subsequent guesses worth $2,500, $2,000, $1,500, and $1,000, respectively. An invalid guess gives the opposing team a chance to steal. If the opposing team gives an invalid guess, play on that word ends.
- In the second round, "Super Lingo," each team is given a clue about a ten-letter mystery word whose letters are revealed over time: each word is worth up to $5,000, with its value decreasing as more letters are revealed. Before they play their word, each team chooses from one of two hoppers of "Lucky Balls," from which a ball is drawn: gold "money balls" add a cash bonus (either $100, $500, or $1,000) on top of the value of the word if solved, while white "letter balls," numbered between 1 and 10, reveal the corresponding letter in the word before the money starts decreasing. In season two, each team is given an additional eleven-letter mystery word to solve. If the team in control fails to solve the mystery word, the other team has a chance to steal the money.
- In the third round, the "Lingo Battle," the two members of each team are assigned to five-letter and six-letter words respectively, with all values from round one doubled. Each word is allowed a maximum of five guesses. If a contestant's guess for a word does not reveal a new correctly placed (green) letter or is invalid, control of the word passes to the opposing player. After the conclusion of this round, a twelve-letter Super Lingo word is played between both teams, which starts at $10,000 ($15,000 in season two). The team that has the most money wins the match and moves on to the Lingo Showdown.
- In the event of a tie game, one more Super Lingo word is played as a tiebreaker to determine the winner of the match.

The two winning teams advance to "Lingo Showdown" to compete for the episode's jackpot, which consists of $50,000 and the total scores of both teams in the main game. Each team attempts to solve as many words as they can in two minutes. In season one, words alternated between five-letter words worth 5 points each and six-letter words worth 10 points each; in season two, all words are five letters and score 1 point. The team who won more money in their match decides who goes first. Teams can pass on words as often as needed. If the team gives an invalid guess on a word, the word in play is removed, and a new word is played. The team that scores more points wins the jackpot. If the Lingo Showdown ends in a tie, one more 12-letter Super Lingo word is played to break the tie. In season two, teams who win the Lingo Showdown are invited to appear on the next show as returning champions.

== Broadcast history ==
The original pilot was taped in Los Angeles in 1986, before relocating to Canada after the show was sold into first-run syndication. The first version premiered on September 28, 1987, with Michael Reagan, adopted son of then U.S. President Ronald Reagan, as host and Dusty Martell as co-host. Beginning on February 22, 1988, executive producer Ralph Andrews took over as host and Margaux MacKenzie replaced Martell as co-host. New episodes aired until March 25, 1988, with repeats airing until September of that year. The show was produced by Ralph Andrews Productions (in association with Bernstein/Hovis Productions) in Canada for syndication by ABR Entertainment in the United States.

On August 5, 2002, Game Show Network revived the program with Chuck Woolery as host. In season three, a co-host was added to reveal the puzzles and provide banter. Woolery's co-host was Stacey Hayes in season three, while Hayes had Paula Cobb as another co-host for the first two episodes of the season. Hayes was later replaced by Shandi Finnessey for the remainder of the series. Randy Thomas, known for her work in Hooked on Phonics ads, was the offstage announcer in season two, with Hayes also acting as announcer in season three. For the remainder of the series, the role of announcer was eliminated.

The first 20 episodes were recorded in the Netherlands on the set of the program's Dutch counterpart; subsequent episodes were produced in the United States. Five more seasons, filmed in Los Angeles and each consisting of 65 episodes, began in December 2002, December 2003, August 2005, April 2006, and April 2007. GSN held back five unaired Hawaiian-themed episodes from season four, and these episodes later aired beginning January 1, 2007. The last episode of the Woolery version aired on June 29, 2007.

In 2011, GSN announced the show would restart production after a nearly four-year hiatus, with Bill Engvall as the new host. One season of forty episodes premiered on June 6, 2011. The last first-run show aired on August 1, 2011.

On February 11, 2022, CBS announced that it had ordered a primetime revival of Lingo, with RuPaul as host and executive producer; it was filmed at Dock10 in Salford, England (where the current British version is filmed) with American contestants. RuPaul also signed on to host a series of Celebrity Lingo episodes for broadcast in the UK. It premiered on January 11, 2023. On February 21, 2023, the series was renewed for a second season. The second season aired from May 24, 2024 to September 20, 2024.

=== Episode status ===
The rights to the 1987 version of the show are held by Ion Television. Ion included it in a February 2007 "viewers vote" on its website, with site visitors being able to vote for the show to be included in the network's schedule. Despite this, Ion has not aired this or any other game show (except the previous year's Family Feud episodes by special arrangement) since 2005. The 2002 and 2011 versions of Lingo remain owned by Game Show Network.

== International versions ==
Country	Name	Host	Channel	Duration
Canada	Lingo (in French)	Paul Houde	Télévision de Radio-Canada	1998–2001
France	Motus	Thierry Beccaro	Antenne 2 France 2	1990–1992; 1992–2019
Germany	5 mal 5	Bernd Schumacher	Sat.1	1993–1994
Greece	Lingo	Nikos Moutsinas	Star Channel	2026–present
Indonesia	Cocok – Coba-Coba Kata	Denny Chandra	SCTV	1996–1998
Israel	לינגו; Lingo	Gil Alon (1994–1996); Assaf Ashtar (1997–1998)	Channel 2	1994–1998
Italy	Lingo	Tiberio Timperi	Canale 5	1992–1993
Italy	Una parola di troppo	Giancarlo Magalli	Rai 2	2021
Italy	Lingo – Parole in gioco	Caterina Balivo	LA7	2022–2023
Netherlands	Lingo	Robert ten Brink (1989–1992); François Boulangé (1992–2000); Nance (2000–2005); Lucille Werner (2005–2014); Jan Versteegh (2019–2023)	Nederland 1 (1989–1991, 2006–2013); Nederland 2 (1991–1992, 2000–2006, 2014); Nederland 3 (1993–2000); SBS6 (2019–2021); Net5 (2022–2023)	1989–2014; 2019–2023
Norway	Lingo	Anders Hatlo (1992–1993); Truls Nebell (1993)	TVNorge	1992–1993
Poland	5×5 – wygrajmy razem	Marek Grabowski	TVP2	1995–1999
Poland	Lingo	Paweł Orleański	TV4	2007
Portugal	Lingo	Heitor Lourenço; Tânia Ribas de Oliveira; Isabel Angelino	RTP1	2006–2007
Portugal	Lingo-Eu Gosto do Verão	José Carlos Malato	RTP1	2007
Slovenia	Lingo	Mito Trefalt; Eva Longyka	TV Slovenija	1995–2002
Spain	Lingo	Ramoncín (1993–1996, 2002–2004); Luis Larrodera (2005–2006); Eduardo Aldán (2006–2007); Ana Ruiz (2021–2022); Aitor Albizua (May 2, 2022 – September 30, 2022); Jon Gómez (October 3, 2022 – December 1, 2022)	TVE2; CMM TV; Punto TV; Canal Sur; ETB2	1993–1996; 2002–2004; 2005–2007; 2021–2022; 2022
Sweden	Lingo	Martin Örnroth; Harald Treutiger	TV4; TV4 Plus	1993–1997; 2003
Sweden	PostkodLingo	Henrik Johnsson	TV4	2013
Turkey	Lingo Türkiye	Kemal Uçar	TRT 1	2023–present
United Kingdom	Lingo	Martin Daniels; Adil Ray	ITV	1988; 2021–present
United Kingdom	Celebrity Lingo	RuPaul; Adil Ray	ITV	2022; 2026

== Merchandise ==
In late 2021, Two Way Media launched a mobile version of Lingo available for iOS and Android users. The game follows a similar format to the 2002–2007 version of Lingo. However, there are some slight differences. Players have a choice of playing a four-letter, five-letter, or six-letter round. If the player correctly guesses a word, they win coins and have the option to play bingo. This version of Lingo does not feature a bonus round.

== See also ==
- Wordle
