= Lingo (Dutch game show) =

Dutch television game show

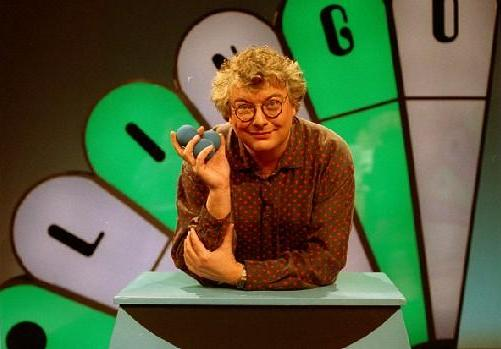
- François Boulangé hosted Lingo in the 1990s
- Genre: Game show
- Based on: Lingo by Ralph Andrews
- Presented by: Robert ten Brink (1989–1992); François Boulangé (1992–2000); Nance (2000–2005); Lucille Werner (2005–2014); Jan Versteegh (2019–2023)
- Narrated by: Jan Peter Pellemans (2005–2014, 2019–2023)
- Country of origin: Netherlands
- No. of episodes: 5665

Production
- Producers: Freddy Groot (1989–1991); Harry de Winter (1989–1999); Frank de Jonge (1999–2009); Lennart Pijnenborg (2010–2014)
- Running time: 20 minutes
- Production companies: IDTV; Omroepvereniging VARA (1989-2000); Televisie Radio Omroep Stichting (2000-2014); AVROTROS (2014); Talpa TV (2019-2023)

Original release
- Network: Nederland 1 (1989-1991, 2006-2013); Nederland 2 (1991-1992, 2000-2006, 2014); Nederland 3 (1992-2000)
- Release: January 5, 1989 – October 2, 2014
- Network: SBS6
- Release: August 26, 2019 – March 12, 2021
- Network: Net5
- Release: August 29, 2022 – June 9, 2023

Lingo is a television game show that aired in the Netherlands between 1989 and 2014 on public television, and returned in 2019 on commercial television where it was broadcast until 2023. The format consists of a word game that combines Mastermind and Bingo. The television game show was broadcast weekly in the beginning, but it later became a daily program.

From 1989 to 2014, the show was broadcast by public broadcasting associations. From 1989 to 2000, it was broadcast by VARA and from September 4, 2000, it was broadcast by TROS (later renamed to AVROTROS). October 2, 2014, the last episode was broadcast by AVROTROS. The show was brought back on air August 26, 2019 by Talpa TV on the commercial channel SBS6. The last episode aired on Net5 on June 9, 2023.

== Origins ==
The original version of the American game show Lingo debuted in syndication in 1987 with Michael Reagan as host and Ralph Andrews as executive producer. Though it ran for only one season, Dutch producers Jan Meulendijks and Harry de Winter were interested in bringing the show to their country.

Eventually, Harry de Winter bought the rights to the show, which had flopped in the United States, and brought it to the Netherlands, where it became a massive hit. He sold the format on to many other countries, and Lingo helped grow IDTV, the production company he had founded in 1977. International versions subsequently appeared in several other European countries and French-speaking Quebec.

Robert ten Brink was the first host of the show in the Netherlands. The first episode aired on VARA on 5 January 1989. He was already well known for hosting the youth news show Het Jeugdjournaal. When Ten Brink left in 1992, François Boulangé took over as host. Boulangé had been the show's editor, and thought hosting was not very important, seeing himself as a judge, rather than a host.

== Gameplay ==
Two teams of two contestants each try to guess and spell words, after being given a letter that's in the word and the length of the word. The game begins with the winners of a coin-toss (the new team if there were champions) making their guess. The length of the word that has to be guessed varies from five to eight letters.

=== Guessing words ===
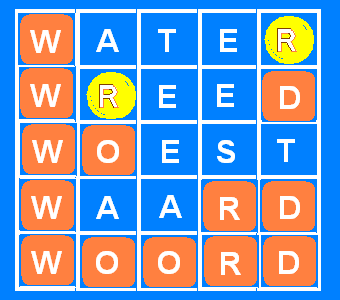
Short explanation: 1. W has been already given and is correct. R is present in the word but is in the wrong place.; 2. D is correct, and R is again in the wrong place.; 3. O is at the correct place.; 4. A is not in the first word (this was already shown to be true in the first guess): the rest is correct.; 5. At the third word, O is already correct. A second O must be the only one needed.

Originally, each team had to guess five-letter words Monday-Friday, and six-letter words on Saturday. From 2002, the game was played with six-letter words every day, and from 2006 on Fridays, seven-letter words. As of February 6, 2012, games start out with five-letter words, then progress to six- and seven-letter words, and finish with a word that contains eight letters (reduced to seven as well as of February 2014).

The starting team is given the first letter of an unknown word, after which they have eight seconds to verbally make a guess on the word. The guess must be a valid Dutch word that is spelt correctly, contains the correct number of letters, and begins with the given letter. The guess must then be spelt out. The word, however, does not have to be the same as the word called out as long as the spelling is correct. The only time conferring is always allowed is on the final word.

If the word is spelt correctly within the eight seconds, the word is shown in a 5×5 grid. Letters of the guess that are in the same position as that of the unknown word are shown in red. Letters that appear in the unknown word but are in the wrong position are shown in a yellow circle. Any correct letters which are in the correct position are automatically copied into the next line.

If a player fails to say a word in time or gives an invalid one, the opposing team gets a turn. That team is then shown the next correct letter in the unknown word (unless there is only one space left); this will also happen if the correct word isn't guessed within five turns. In this sixth turn, the opposing team may now confer, but if the word isn't guessed at this point, it's revealed and control goes back to the first team.

Unusual words such as verb conjugations (e.g. "speaks") are considered valid words for a team to guess for the sake of giving themselves clues as to the real word but are never the correct answer.

From 1989 to 2001, correct answers were worth ƒ50. Prior to 2013, each word was worth €25 except for the last word which scored €40. From 2013 on, teams earned €15 for the first three five-letter words, €25 for the next three six-letter words, then €40 for the three seven-letter words after that. This was followed by a final eight-letter puzzle (seven letters as well as of February 2014) where the teams take it in turns, beginning at €60 and decreasing by €10 after every guess. On the 2019 revival, each word scores €15.

From 2008 to 2014 a new rule was added: the opposing team could guess the word, even when it was the other team's turn, but they could only do this once per game. If the opposing team thought they knew the word, they could press their button and guess it, doubling their score if correct, and halving it if incorrect.

=== Drawing balls ===
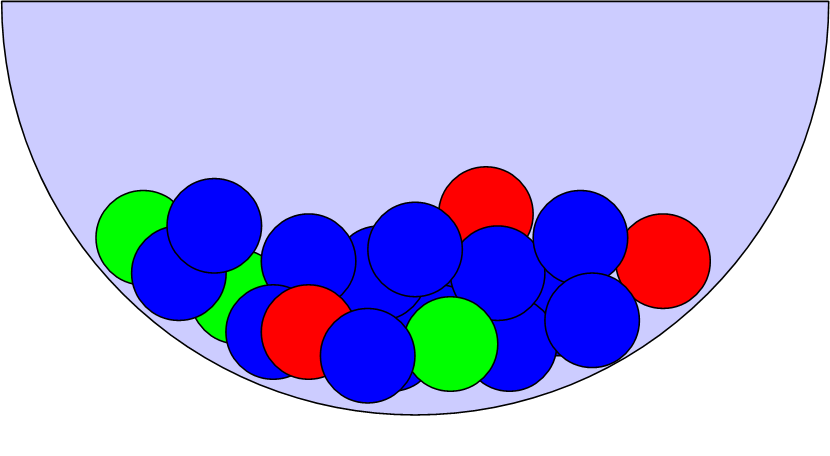
Ball basin if there are no balls taken out: 18 blue balls (among which one question mark), three red balls and three green balls.

If the word was correctly guessed, the team which guessed the word correctly may draw two balls from the ball basin. Each team had a Lingo card with 25 numbers on it (odd numbers for one team, even for the other) with eight numbers crossed off before the game started. Each team's goal was to cross off numbers on the Lingo card by drawing the appropriately numbered ball to obtain a horizontal, vertical or diagonal line of five numbers. In that case, the team was said to have achieved a Lingo.

Each team had a ball basin, each with 17 blue numbered balls, 1 blue ball with a question mark, 3 green balls and 3 red balls. The numbers on the balls corresponded to the numbers on the Lingo card and were crossed off the card if that ball was drawn. The question mark acted as a wildcard: if this ball was drawn, the team could choose any number from the Lingo card to be crossed off. However, the ball with that number on it remained in the ball basin, and should it be subsequently drawn, the team had effectively wasted a turn.

If a green ball was drawn, it was placed above the ball basin and the team could draw another ball. If a team drew all three green balls, they won a jackpot that increased with each correctly guessed word (but didn't count towards the score). From 1989 to 2000, the jackpot increased by ƒ50, and carried over from show to show; as of 2000, it started at €0 and increased by €100 (ƒ500 from 2000 to 2001) per word but reset to €0 for each show, as well as when it was won.

If a player drew a red ball, their team's turn was over and play continued with the other team. Red balls were discarded after having been drawn so they didn't return to the ball basin.

If a team obtains Lingo, that team received bonus money and was provided with a new Lingo card with new balls. Green balls carried over to a new Lingo card, but red balls did not. Thus, at the start of a new Lingo card, there would again be three red balls in the ball basin. The three green balls were only put back into the basin once the team has won the jackpot, allowing them a chance to win it at least twice in the same episode.

From 1989 to 2001, a Lingo won ƒ100, but as of 2002, a Lingo was worth €100. The team obtaining Lingo received a new card and control passed to the opposing team. In early shows, however, obtaining Lingo did not pass control to the opponents, and both teams received new cards.

Early Saturday night episodes where 6-letter words were introduced did not use the green balls at all. Other episodes during Nance's tenure as emcee involved the green balls having numbers of them; this was a tie-in to the Postcode National Lottery, where home viewers won cash and prizes based on what numbers on the green balls were revealed.

On the 2019 revival, instead of drawing numbers, the team draws balls with letters in a scrambled word with 11 letters, plus one more for each new word. Each drawn letter is placed in its correct position and guessing their word scored €100. The red balls are still there, but control now also passes to the other team if they attempt to guess the word (regardless of whether or not they were correct). Additionally, there are only two green balls per team, but there's no jackpot; drawing one now awards another €10, and if both teams draw their green balls, everyone in the audience wins €50. The green balls were removed from 2020 to 2021 due to the COVID-19 pandemic.

=== Ten-letter word ===
From 2002 to 2006, a new letter would be revealed in a ten-letter word after every turn and the first team to guess the word scored €100. From 2007, every three turns, the teams had to try guessing a ten-letter word from a given anagram (using the same color code) with three letters in place at the start. As time passed, the letters switched so that more letters were in their correct place. If a team guessed the word within a few seconds, they received €70. As time passed, the word's value was reduced by €10 with each letter in the correct place.

The original versions of the 1990s and the 2019 reboot don't use ten-letter words.

=== Tiebreaker ===
In the first episodes of Lingo (before the introduction of the National Postcode Lottery), it could occur that the two teams were tied at the end of the game. In that event a tiebreaker was played, the game continued the same as with a regular word, except that turns switched after each guess. Conferring was allowed for the entire word. Guessing the word correctly won the game but was worth no money and teams were not allowed to draw more balls.

Later on in the series, the tiebreaker was replaced by the ten-letter word (played on the same basis as above). Because this word was worth more money than a regular word, ties were no longer possible.

In 2019, the tiebreaker returned to the game. If there is a tie after the last word, a seven-letter word is played in the same way as the last word.

=== Final round ===
The team with the highest score after the last round goes to the final. The other team receives, apart from the won money prize, a consolation prize. From 1989 to 2014, the consolation prize was a Lingo-branded bag. As of 2019, it's a pair of Lingo socks.

==== First version ====
See also No Lingo Bonus Round from the 1987-88 North American version.

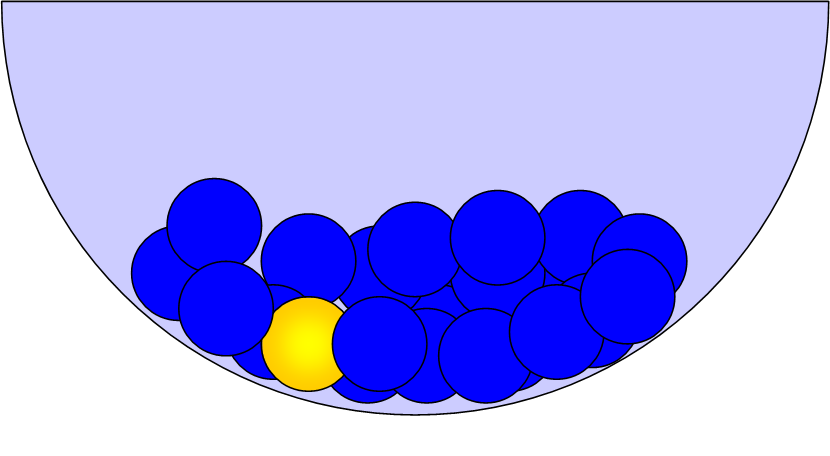
At the start of the first version of the Finale, there were 35 blue balls and 1 golden ball.

In the original version of Lingo transmitted by VARA, the final round was based on the "No Lingo" round in the original 1987 North American version. The team guesses up to five words in this round and must draw numbers from their hopper for every guess they took. This version lasted until 2001.

At the beginning of the finale, the team received a 25-number Lingo card, and 16 numbers were crossed off. The center space was left uncovered; this number would always make a Lingo when drawn. The hopper is filled with 35 odd- or even-numbered balls and one gold ball.

The finale was played with five words. The team guessed a five-letter word, as per normal gameplay. For each attempt, they had to draw one ball from the hopper (e.g., if a word was solved in four attempts, four balls had been drawn). If the word wasn't guessed, a one-ball penalty was applied (for a total of six balls). If a numbered ball is drawn that wasn't on the board, nothing was crossed off and it was discarded. If a numbered ball was drawn that was on the board, it was crossed off, and the ball was discarded as well. If the team drew the gold ball, they stopped drawing and their money was automatically doubled. If they managed to draw the required number of balls (or the gold ball) without completing a Lingo, the team's money was doubled. If at any point a number was drawn that formed a Lingo on the board, the game ended and the team lost all their winnings. After every word, they could risk their money and play on or stop and take the money accrued thus far.

During this time, if a team Lingoed in the finale, they were allowed to return on the next episode to hopefully try again (up to three shows). Also, this version of the finale gave rise to the famous sentence, "Staat... niet op de kaart!" ([The number] is... not on the board!) which was always called if a numbered ball was drawn and not present on the Lingo card.

==== Second version ====
This version of the final round was played from 2001 to 2006. An earlier version of this finale was also used before 2001 in Saturday night episodes with 6-letter words. The team had to correctly guess eight five-letter words (later seven six-letter words) within three minutes, and if successful, they won €5,000 (formerly ƒ10,000). From here until 2014, teams were restricted to one appearance and left the show afterwards.

==== Third version ====
The third version of the finale is based on the second United States version's final round called "Bonus Lingo".

The team has two and a half minutes to guess as many words as possible, with a five-attempt limit at a word. The contestants must take turns when guessing and can't confer with each other (unlike in the U.S.) and if they stall for too long, they get buzzed out and lose a turn. For each word guessed correctly within the time limit, they get to draw a numbered ball from the hopper.

After time expires, the team is given a Lingo card with nine numbers (instead of the twelve like in the U.S.) crossed off (although originally, there were ten numbers crossed off). One of the balls in the hopper always forms a Lingo when it is drawn (potentially as early as the first pull). The team then draws the number of balls they won. The hopper starts off with 15 numbered balls. If a team successfully makes a Lingo, they win the cash. Unlike in the US version, however, there is no bonus for forming a Lingo on the first ball.

In February 2009, a silver ball was added to the hopper in this round. If it is drawn, the team can choose from two options: they can quit drawing at this point and take home €2,500, or they can decline and continue playing.

Until 2010, the top prize was €5,000. From 2010 on, each word added €1,000 to the potential prize. In 2012, a pink ball was also added that awards a bonus prize when drawn. As before, drawing the silver ball gives the option of leaving with half the pot.

For the 5,000th show in 2013, each word added €5,000 to the pot. This endgame was won, for a grand total of €35,640.

On the 2019 revival, making a Lingo wins €5,000, and a gold ball (mixed in with the number balls) gives the team the option to take €2,500 or play on. Until 2023, making a Lingo won €2,500 and the gold ball would win the team a holiday worth roughly €1,500; the latter was replaced with a €1,000 cheque for 2020, and a gold LINGO piggy bank containing €500 in 2021. In 2020, there was also a black ball awarding both players a complete kitchen; and in 2022, there was a purple ball worth a bonus of €500.

On SBS6, winning teams initially played until they were defeated, but from 2020, they were restricted to a maximum of five appearances (reduced to three in October). As of 2022, all teams are again restricted to a single appearance.

== Lingo Bingo Show ==
A special alternative to Lingo which was transmitted on Nederland 1 is the Lingo Bingo Show, presented by Lucille Werner. Here, four teams consisting of Dutch celebrities play against each other.

Similarly to ordinary Lingo, these teams must correctly guess words and then draw balls. The main difference is that the ball barge has five different colors of balls with the characters B, I, N, G, and O written on them in place of numbers. Every team must try to draw one ball of each color and draw so that the word BINGO is formed. If they draw a blank ball, they lose their turn. At the same time, the home viewers can win prizes based on the traditional game of bingo.

The final is played between the two best teams. Both teams get 2.5 minutes to correctly guess as many words as possible, and both teams guess the same set of words. The second team, therefore, is isolated in a soundproof booth while the first team is taking their turn.

In some episodes, François Boulangé acted as judge and word authority, and frequently interacted with host Lucille Werner.

== History ==
Starting in 1989, the show aired weekly, later daily on one of the Dutch public television channels, broadcast by VARA. It was presented by Robert ten Brink and later by François Boulangé.

In 2000, Lingo was taken over by TROS and serious changes were carried out. The duration of the programme was shortened and the Nationale Postcode Loterij (National Postcode Lottery) started publishing the 'Postcode Lingo' lottery results. By both modifying the play time and significantly reducing the number of words, the points and therefore the prize money that teams could win diminished. The rules of the show had also changed, particularly the final round (as previously discussed). Also, Nance became the new host and Michiel Eijsbouts became the new jury.

With Nance's transition from TROS to SBS in September 2005, a new host took over: Lucille Werner, who had previously hosted Get The Picture and Michiel Eijsbouts (the jury) was replaced by JP (Jan Peter Pellemans). On July 30, 2014, it was announced that Lingo would stop producing new episodes starting in September 2014 due to declining ratings. The last episode on public television aired on October 2, 2014.

The show returned on August 26, 2019, on the commercial channel SBS6 with Jan Versteegh as the new host. In 2022, the show was transferred to commercial channel Net5. The final episode was aired on June 9, 2023.

The hosts of the show included:

- Robert ten Brink (1989–1992)
- François Boulangé (1992–2000)
- Nance (2000–2005)
- Lucille Werner (2005–2014)
- Jan Versteegh (2019–2023)

== Jury and voiceover ==
At each episode of Lingo there was a jury check to see if each called word exists. Since 2002, the jury also did the announcing for the show. The show's jury included:

- Michiel Eijsbouts (2002–2005)
- Jan Peter Pellemans (JP) (2005–2014, 2019–2023)
- François Boulangé (for Lingo Bingo Show)

In 2000 and 2001, Gaston Starreveld announced the show.

== Possible moves ==
In October 2006, leaks from the network coordinator Ton F. van Dijk (a telejournalist for Nederland 1, a national television station) revealed that public broadcasting considered ending Lingo in 2007. The programme drew many older viewers, while the organisations wanted to draw a younger audience. This caused such a commotion that prime minister Jan Peter Balkenende was tempted to make official statements about the rumor.

Commercial broadcaster RTL 4 had shown interest in obtaining the rights to the show if they were abandoned by public broadcasting. TROS stated on 17 October that they would keep showing the game, but they wanted to examine how they could adapt the game for a broader public.

On the broadcast of 19 October 2006, Lucille indicated simply that Lingo would continue at TROS. Moreover, this broadcast came after a bet between Robert Jensen and Lucille. This bet implied that she would appear on TV with a deep décolletage. In return, Jensen would participate with Jan Paparazzi on an episode of Lingo. They did not make it to the final.

== Charities ==
Later on (dates are unclear), up to 2009, Lingo was coupled with the 'Sponsor Bingo Lottery', a Dutch lottery. In this show, the winning bingo (lottery) numbers were presented by Dutch celebrity Rick Brandsteder. He would also surprise one of the winners with a new car.

== Other media ==
Various versions of Lingo were produced for the PC and for consoles such as the Nintendo DS. The 2000 PC game, however, does not use the green ball rule.
