= Winston Gerschtanowitz =

Dutch presenter and actor

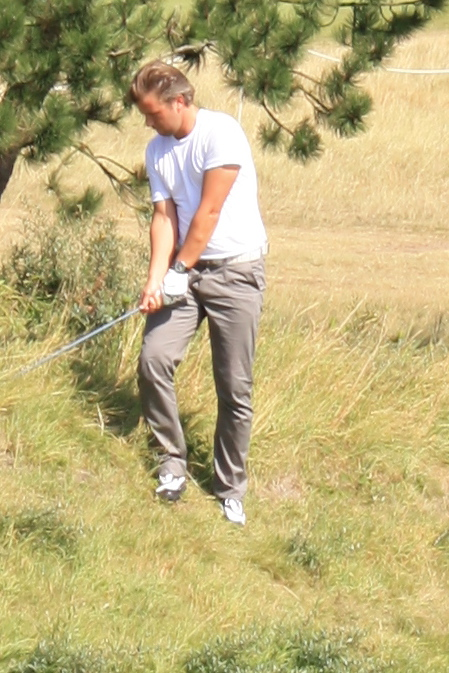
- Gerschtanowitz at the KLM Open 2009.
- Born: Winston Ronald Gerschtanowitz; Amsterdam, Netherlands
- Occupations: Actor, Presenter, Owner of Media Republic
- Years active: 1996 - Present
- Known for: Goudkust, The Voice of Holland, RTL Boulevard
- Spouse: Renate Verbaan (2011-present)
- Children: Julian Gerschtanowitz (Born 2008); Benjamin Gerschtanowitz (Born 2010)

Winston Ronald Gerschtanowitz is a Dutch presenter and actor.

== Education ==
Gerschtanowitz completed a HAVO education at the Keizer Karel College in Amstelveen.

== Career ==
Gerschtanowitz' first became famous to the general audience for his role as Harm van Cloppenburg in the Dutch soap Goudkust.

After this Gerschtanowitz became part of Dutch boy band 4 Fun together with fellow actors Michiel de Zeeuw, Jimmy Geduld en Chris Zegers.

Gerschtanowitz later featured in various television programs, most notable of which was the lifestyle-show Wannahaves.

In 2005, Gerschtanowitz switched over to Talpa. Here he presented the shows Thuis and In de huid van....

In 2007, Gerschtanowitz participated in the second season of Dancing on Ice on RTL 4, after which he would regularly be featured on the channel. In June 2008, Gerschtanowitz replaced Daphne Bunskoek as the main presenter of the popular show RTL Boulevard. In 2010 Gerschtanowitz was a presenter of the talent-show The Voice of Holland which he presented for its first four seasons. During this period he also presented Let's Get Married in 2011, Your Face Sounds Familiar in 2012 and Postcode Loterij: Beat The Crowd in 2014.

In 2017, Gerschtanowitz left RTL 4 and switched to SBS6 where he would be presenting large studio shows. His first program at SBS6 was Wat vindt Nederland?. He later also presented It takes 2 with Gordon.

Gerschtanowitz featured as extra in several movies, most notable of which the 2004 movie Gay.

=== Off-screen ===
Winston Gerschtanowitz is the owner and founder of Media Republic. Media Republic specialized in creating multimedia television formats. He produced Jong Zuid (a soap for smartphones) and 2GOTV (a television channel for mobile platforms).

Between 2015 and 2016, Gerschtanowitz served as CCO of Talpa Media.

== Personal life ==
On 9 July 2011, Gerschtanowitz married Renate Verbaan. The two already had two sons before marrying, born in 2008 and 2010.

Gerschtanowitz is an amateur golfer. He has handicap 13.5. In 2009, he participated in the Pro-Am of the KLM Open in the team of Peter Hedblom.

== Filmography ==
- Gay - uncredited (2004)
- Gooische Vrouwen - Himself (2011)
- Leve Boerenliefde - Himself (2013)

=== Television ===
==== As presenter ====
- Postcode Loterij Miljoenenjacht (Co-presenter: 2003–present)
- Gouden Televizier-Ring Gala - with Tooske Breugem (2004)
- AVRO's Sterrenjacht (2004)
- RTL Boulevard (2004-2005, 2007–2008, Main presenter: 2008–2017)
- Thuis (2005)
- In de huid van... (2005)
- 1 Miljoen Wat? (2006-2007)
- Eén tegen 100 - postcode Kanjer special (2009)
- Ik kom bij je eten (2009)
- The Voice of Holland (2010-2013)
- Let's Get Married (2011)
- De Postcode Loterij Nieuwjaarsshow (2012)
- Your Face Sounds Familiar (2012)
- Postcode Loterij Miljoenenjacht (2013, 1 episode, replacing Linda de Mol)
- Postcode Loterij: Beat The Crowd (2014)
- Wat vindt Nederland? (2017)
- Mensenkennis (2017–2018)
- Circus Gerschtanowitz (2017)
- BankGiro Loterij The Wall (2018–2019)
- It Takes 2 (2019) with Gordon
- Nederland Geeft Licht (2019) with Leonie ter Braak
- Dancing on Ice (2019) with Patty Brard
- 50/50 (2020–present), with Kim-Lian van der Meij as of season 3
- Marble Mania (2021–present)
- Shownieuws (2021, 1 episode)
- Car Wars (2021)

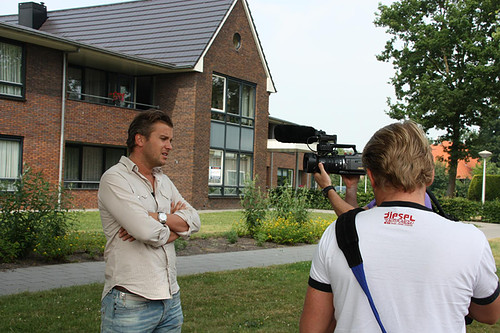
Winston Gerschtanowitz in 2010

==== As guest/participant ====
- Raymann is laat (2003)
- Barend & Van Dorp (2003)
- Goedemorgen Nederland (2004)
- Kopspijkers (2004)
- Spuiten en Slikken (2006)
- Dancing on Ice (2007)
- Shownieuws (2007)
- Jensen! (2007)
- Ik hou van Holland (2008, 2009, 2010, 2013, 2015)
- Ranking the stars (2007)
- Carlo & Irene: Life4You (2009)
- Pownews (2011)
- De Jongens tegen de Meisjes (2011)
- Het Perfecte Plaatje (2016)
- De Kluis (2019)
- The Masked Singer (2022)

==== As actor ====
- Goudkust - Harm van Cloppenburg (1996-2000)
- Goede tijden, slechte tijden - Laurent van Buuren (1997)
- Pittige tijden - Harm / Meta (1997-1998)
- Baantjer - Otto (1999)
- All Stars - Golfbal (2001)
- Shouf Shouf Habibi! - Daan (2004)
- Gooische Vrouwen - Himself (2008)
- Zeg 'ns Aaa - Himself (2009)
- De TV Kantine - Bud Bundy (2010)
- Dokter Deen - Himself (2013)
- Divorce - Himself (2014)
