= Lucille Werner =

Dutch television presenter and politician

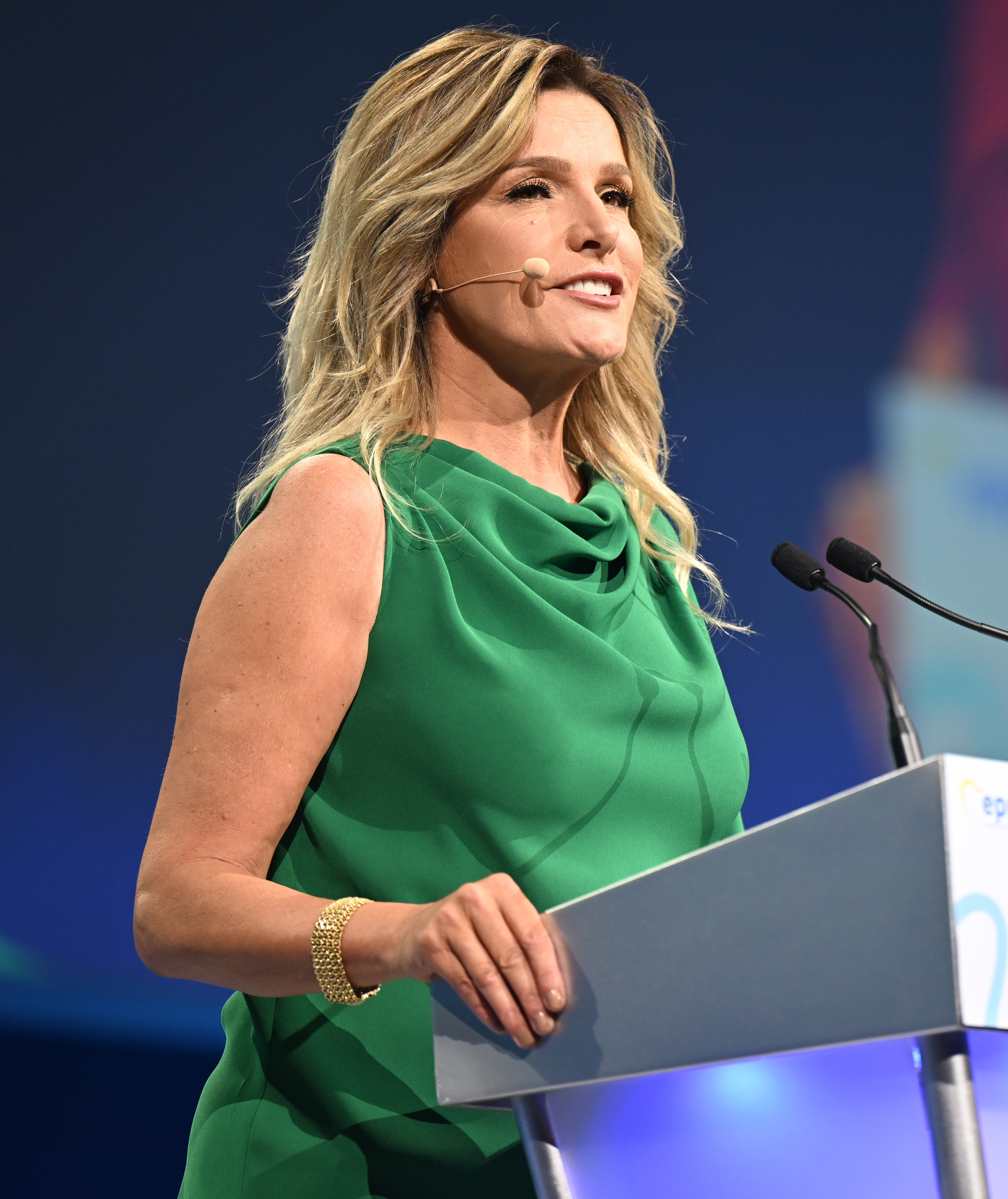
- Werner at a 2022 congress of the European People's Party

Member of the House of Representatives
- In office 31 March 2021 – 21 November 2023

Personal details
- Born: Lucille Martine Werner; 12 October 1967 (age 59) Eindhoven, Netherlands
- Party: Christian Democratic Appeal
- Spouse: Servaas Snoeijers (m. 2009)
- Relatives: Jos Werner (uncle)
- Occupation: Television presenter
- Known for: Lingo, Get the Picture

Lucille Martine Werner (born 12 October 1967) is a Dutch television presenter and politician. She is best known for hosting close to 2,000 episodes of the word game show Lingo in the years 2005–14.

Werner started her career at the Holland Media Group, anchoring news programs about show business. Later, she became a host of game shows and moved to public broadcasting. She presented Get the Picture between 2002 and 2004 before becoming the host of Lingo. After that show was cancelled, Werner worked for SBS6 and KRO-NCRV. Being born with a disability, Werner has also hosted a number of shows involving disabled participants including the pageant Mis(s)verkiezing.

She was elected member of parliament in the 2021 general election as a member of the Christian Democratic Appeal (CDA).

== Early life and education ==
She was born in 1967 in the North Brabant city of Eindhoven to Pieter Werner (1936–1989) and Paula Ramselaar (born 1942), an analyst. Werner suffered from a lack of oxygen during her birth, leaving her with cerebral palsy resulting in a limp. She grew up with two sisters and one brother. At age four, her family moved to the Colombian capital Bogotá, when her father was transferred there by his employer Philips. They moved to the village Leek in Groningen after seven years abroad and later returned to Eindhoven. She attended the high school Sint-Joriscollege at mavo level between 1980 and 1985. She subsequently studied management and communication at hbo level at Schoevers in Groningen. Her father committed suicide when Werner was 21 years old.

== Television career ==
=== RTL and AVRO ===
Starting in 1990, Werner interned at De 5 uur show, a talkshow on RTL 4. In 1993, she got a job as an editor of the RTL program Showtime. She also served as a correspondent and interviewed celebrities including David Bowie and Tina Turner. Werner made her debut as a television host in September 1997, when the news show RTL Actueel premiered. She co-anchored its segment about show business news. After RTL Actueel was discontinued in June of the following year, Werner became host of several other RTL show business programs: Showtime, Big Entertainment Club, and the two-hour-long Hollands Hollywood on Saturdays. She co-presented the last two of those shows with Michael Pilarczyk. Besides, she encouraged viewers of Henny's House Party, a talent show for disabled people, to donate money to a charity. Werner started presenting game shows in 1999. Her first such show was Zomerkampioen in the summer with Jo De Poorter. In the years 1999–2001, she served as one of the hosts of the new daytime phone-in quiz Puzzeltijd.

Werner signed a three-year contract with public broadcasting association AVRO in 2001. Her first show there was Alle dieren tellen mee, which was alternately presented by Werner and Anniko van Santen starting in September, about animals. She hosted another five-episode animal show called De dierentolk, in which a medium communicated with animals, two years later. Werner became a game show host at AVRO in 2002. Smarttest was broadcast starting in January for a short period in the early evening on weekdays. In the second half of 2002, Werner became the sole presenter of Get the Picture and Capibara. The former game show was on television in the early evening on weekdays and was hosted before by Paula Udondek, while the latter program had questions about animals and was broadcast on Saturdays. Both programs went off the air in 2004, when she had presented over 500 Get the Picture episodes.

=== Lingo and further career ===
Werner began hosting the TROS word game show Lingo on 1 September 2005. The program was broadcast every weekday in the early evening, and she succeeded Nancy Coolen. When rumors reached the media in late 2006 that the network coordinator considered ending Lingo, Prime Minister Jan Peter Balkenende reacted by asking the rhetorical question "How fond are we of presenter Lucille Werner?" In 2007, Werner also hosted the five-episode spin-off Lingo Bingo Show, in which celebrities competed and raised money for the VUmc Cancer Center Amsterdam. That same year, she was co-host on Friday of the new Evangelische Omroep talk show Knevel & Van den Brink, appearing as sidekick of Andries Knevel and Thijs van den Brink. Besides, Werner was one of two Dutch commentators of both editions of the Eurovision Dance Contest. She presented the selection of the Dutch candidate in 2007 as well. Werner hosted another talk show in the years 2011–12, when she served as the Friday host of 5op2, which was broadcast in the afternoon by Omroep NTR. In 2013, she started serving as an ambassador for the lottery VriendenLoterij.

Lingo celebrated its 25th birthday in early 2014 and was moved from the channel Nederland 1 to Nederland 2. The show went off the air later that year after its average daily ratings had decreased from about 800,000 to 370,000. Werner had presented almost 2,000 episodes, the last of which was broadcast on 2 October. In the summer of 2015, Werner hosted the Dutch version of quiz show Pointless. She moved to SBS Broadcasting in 2016. Her first show on its channel SBS6 was Show XL, a program about entertainment news in the late afternoon on Sundays. It was co-hosted by Fred van Leer and was cancelled after three episodes due to low ratings. Werner also hosted Mijn laatste keer in 2016 about terminally ill people enjoying their last moments. Her contract was not renewed the following year.

She became one of the hosts of De Ochtend Show to go, a new online news program by a number of DPG Media newspapers, in December 2018. However, Werner left the show after one month because she had signed a two-year contract with broadcaster KRO-NCRV.

== Advancement of disabled people ==
During her television career, Werner has supported disabled people. She was the host of a 2003–04 concert tour by musicians with a disability and presented the 2005 singing competition Scholierentour for young people. Half of its participants were disabled. Werner also wrote a book, which was published in May 2005, about her life as a disabled person called Het leven loopt op rolletjes (Life runs smoothly/Life runs on wheels). She handed the first example to Prime Minister Balkenende.

Besides, Werner was initiator of Mis(s)verkiezing, a pageant for people with a disability. It was hosted by her and Jaap Jongbloed in 2006 and 2007 and was broadcast by TROS, where she presented Lingo. Balkenende crowned the winner. Mis(s)verkiezing was succeeded by the CAPawards, which were given to persons who had best overcome their disability. It was organized in 2008 and 2009 and was nominated for a Rose d'Or. A children's version called Cappies was broadcast between 2009 and 2012 by TROS and was hosted by Werner as well. In addition, she created the children's drama series Caps Club, that has three seasons and was broadcast by TROS/AVROTROS and in Belgium by Ketnet in the years 2013–16. The show about a visually impaired boy nicknamed Cappie and his friends had a cast that included disabled child actors. Werner also had a minor role in the series. When Werner had signed a contract with SBS6, her pageant Mis(s)verkiezing was held once more in 2017. She presented it together with Kees Tol, while the winner was crowned by Prime Minister Mark Rutte. In 2019, Werner co-hosted a live show of KRO-NCRV in which an unofficial Minister of Disabled Affairs was chosen.

Furthermore, Werner has a charity, the Lucille Werner Foundation, which has been supporting disabled people since 2006. She launched CAP100, a website showing job seekers with a disability to potential employers, in November 2010. Werner has received a number of awards for her dedication to helping disabled people, namely the 2006 Frekie Trofee, the 2007 Nationale Revalidatie Prijs (National rehabilitation award), the 2008 Cleopatra Award from Miss Nederland, the 2011 Martin Luther King/Hi5 Award, and the 2012 Majoor Bosshardt Prijs from the Leger des Heils. She is also a knight in the Order of Orange-Nassau.

== Politics ==
She ran for member of parliament in the March 2021 general election. Werner was elected as the tenth candidate on the CDA's party list and received 7,133 preference votes. She was installed on 31 March and became her party's spokesperson for disability policy, long-term health care, caregiving, the Social Support Act 2015, volunteering, media, culture, emancipation, and civilian service. Werner is on the Committees for Art, for Education, Culture and Science, for Health, Welfare and Sport, and for Petitions. In the House, she proposed a fixed television channel number for regional broadcasters in order to increase their visibility. Together with two other parties, she also advocated for appropriating additional funds to the public broadcasting organization to increase the amount of programs with audio description. Regarding disabilities more generally, Werner pled for talking about the group more often in terms of emancipation than in terms of healthcare. A 2022 motion by her to establish a citizens' panel to explore the issue further was carried by the House after the cabinet had advised against it. When the collapse of the fourth Rutte cabinet triggered a snap election in November 2023, Werner announced she would not run for re-election.

== Personal life ==
In the second half of the 1990s, Werner bought a historic farm in the North Brabant village Strijbeek, situated close to the border with Belgium, where she lived with her boyfriend. She moved to Amsterdam in 2004 after her eight-year relationship had ended. She married Servaas Snoeijers (born 1969), who works in the media industry, in their place of residence Nederhorst den Berg on 5 June 2009 after being in a relationship with him for five years. They adopted a four-year-old Bulgarian boy called Angel in 2014. Werner moved from Nederhorst den Berg to Voorburg during her membership of the House of Representatives. She has been singer in a number of bands playing rock and South American music.

Jos Werner, a CDA senator, is her uncle.

== Filmography ==
| Year | Title | Role |
|---|---|---|
| 1997–1998 | RTL Actueel | Co-anchor |
| 1998 | Henny's House Party | Assistant |
| 1998 | Showtime | Anchor |
| 1998–1999 | Hollands Hollywood | Co-host |
| 1999 | Big Entertainment Club | Co-anchor |
| 1999 | Zomerkampioen | Co-host |
| 1999–2001 | Puzzeltijd | Host |
| 2001–2002 | Alle dieren tellen mee | Host |
| 2002 | Smarttest | Host |
| 2002–2004 | Get the Picture | Host |
| 2002–2004 | Capibara | Host |
| 2003 | De dierentolk | Host |
| 2005–2014 | Lingo | Host |
| 2007 | Knevel & Van den Brink | Co-host |
| 2007 | Lingo Bingo Show | Host |
| 2011–2012 | 5op2 | Host |
| 2015 | Pointless (Dutch version) | Host |
| 2016 | Show XL | Co-host |
| 2016 | Mijn laatste keer | Host |

== Decorations ==
- Order of Orange-Nassau
  - Knight (18 August 2010)

== Electoral history ==
Electoral history of Lucille Werner
| Year | Body | Party | Pos. | Votes | Result | | Ref. |
| Year | Body | Party | Pos. | Votes | Party seats | Individual | Ref. |
|---|---|---|---|---|---|---|---|
| 2021 | House of Representatives | Christian Democratic Appeal | 10 | 7,133 | 15 | Won | |
