= Goudkust =

Dutch televisies series

- Genre: Soap
- Developed by: Olga Madsen; Rogier Proper; Marc Linssen; Marciel Witteman
- Story by: Olga Madsen; Rogier Proper; Marc Linssen; Anne Huizinga; Kennard Bos; Sabine van den Eynden; Martin van Steijn
- Directed by: Antoinette Beumer; Mannin de Wildt; Dennis Bots; Aart van Asperen; Leonie Biegel
- Country of origin: Netherlands
- Original language: Dutch
- No. of seasons: 6
- No. of episodes: 925

Production
- Executive producers: Idse Grotenhuis; Eline Teijsse
- Producer: Joop van den Ende
- Cinematography: Pascal Naber
- Running time: 30 min.
- Production companies: Endemol; Joop van den Ende TV Produkties B.V.

Original release
- Network: SBS6 (1996-1999); FOX 8 (1999-2001); NET 5 (2001)
- Release: March 11, 1996 – February 28, 2001

Goudkust (lit. 'Gold Coast') is a Dutch television series, which was broadcast by SBS6. When SBS6 was not happy about the results of the series, it sold the series to FOX 8. When FOX in 2001 sold FOX 8 to SBS Broadcasting the series was aired on NET 5, where the series stopped, something that SBS6 did two years earlier.

== Cast ==
=== A ===
- Vastert van Aardenne - Thomas van Zuylen (1997-1998)
- Judith Ansems - Simone van Aemstel (1999)
- Ingeborg Ansing - Alexandra Visser (2001)
- Josefine van Asdonk - Irene Verweijden (#1) (1996-2000)
- Viviënne van den Assem - Sophie Bergman (2000-2001)

=== B ===
- Femke Bakker - Angelique de Haas
- Suzanne Becht - Studente Marieke (1996)
- Antoinette van Belle - Isabel de Hondt
- Alexander van Bergen - Dirk Bisschop (1997)
- Ferdinand Biesheuvel - Bas Karels (1996) / Hans Mathijssen (1997)
- Tjeerd Bisschoff - Ben Bijlsma
- Joost Boer - Bert Zoomers (1996-1999) / Joris Zoomers (1999)
- Marit van Bohemen - Bianca Sterman (1997)
- Fleur Bok - Arlette (1996)
- Filip Bolluyt - Henri van Cloppenburg (#2) (1998-2001)
- Ron Christian Boom - Tuinman Henk (1996)
- Corine Boon - Emma Verkuil (1997-2000)
- Robert Borremans - Pierre Laroux (1996)
- Froukje de Both - Mariët Zoomers (#2) (1997-2001)
- Chip Bray - Jimmy Belvedere
- Esmée de la Bretonière - Irene Verweijden (#2) (2000-2001)
- Femke-Anna Broere - Mariët Zoomers (#1) (1996-1997)
- Koert-Jan de Bruijn - Beer van Nispen (2001)

=== C ===
- Anne Cavadino - Yvette van Cloppenburg (#1) (1996)
- Mohammed Chaara - Samir Amarani (#2) (2000-2001)
- Hans Cornelissen - Huibrecht van Zuylen (1996, 1997)
- Gerda Cronie - Mavis Zuidgeest (2000)

=== D ===
- Roemer Daalderop - Theo van Hoorn (1996)
- Iwan Dam - Rein Veltkamp (2000)
- Joost Demmers - Robin van Mijnsbergen (1996)
- Lucas Dietens - Gerard Hardebol (1996-1997)
- Nova van Dijk - Coosje Verkerk (1998)
- Jaap van Donselaar - Johannes van Deventer (1996)
- Harold Dückers - Marc Visser (1996-1999)

=== E ===
- Rein Edzard - Lucas Piersma (1996-1997)
- Maureen Eerdmans - Lisa Zoomers (1996-1999, 2000)

=== F ===
- Elcon Fleur - Junior Zuidgeest (1999-2001)

=== G ===
- Winston Gerschtanowitz - Harm van Cloppenburg (#1) (1996-2000)
- Madeleine Gibson - Tineke van Deventer (1996-1997)
- Roger Goudsmit - Guido Bierkens (1996-1997)
- Metta Gramberg - Eline Kervezee (1998)
- Ezra van Groningen - Ralph Seebregts (1998-2000)
- Theo de Groot - Norbert Zwaardman (1999)

=== H ===
- Marc Hazewinkel - Maurits Odijk
- Hans van Hechten - Benno Post
- Sander de Heer - Robert van Galen (1996) / David Bergman (2000)
- Inger van Heijst - Fie Hardebol (1996-1997)
- Pim van den Heuvel - Wethouder van Sterkenburg (1996)
- Mike Ho Sam Sooi - Aaron Zuidgeest (#1) (1999-2000)
- Ad Hoeymans - Harold Lohman (1996-1997)
- Jannie Houweling - Marie-Louise Zilverbergh (1996-1997)
- Guido van Hulzen - Ron Lohman (1996-1997)

=== J ===
- Eric Jorrin - Alex

=== K ===
- Norbert Kaart - Brian Wiggers
- Maiko Kemper - Erik van Overeem (1997-1998, 2000 (gast))
- Adriënne Kleiweg - Mary Zoomers (1996-1999, 2000)
- Mark Kleuskens - Walter de Jonge
- Melvyn de Kom - Menno Landvreugd
- Betje Koolhaas - Yvette van Cloppenburg (#2) (1997-2000)
- Anke Kranendonk - Johanna Stapper (1996)
- Arnost Kraus - Harm van Cloppenburg (#2) (2000-2001)
- Michael Kroegman - Daan van der Meulen (2000)
- Marc Krone - Ad Bleerick (1996)
- Cis Kuipers - Huishoudster Mieke (1996)
- Anke Kranendonk - Johanna Stapper (1996)
- Roel Kyvelos - Nick Sterman (#1) (1997-2000)

=== L ===
- Joost Laterveer - Peter Kempenaar
- Annemarieke Leeuwenkamp - Lerares Antheunissen (1996)
- Lieke van Lexmond - Eva Prins (1998-2001)
- Kees van Lier - Conciërge Pol (1996)
- Eugène Ligtvoet - Cor Koopman
- Stan Limburg - Hans de Jong (1996)
- Carla Lipp - Therese Segaar (2000)
- Ingeborg Loedeman - Willemijn Laroux (1996)
- David van Lunteren - Lennart Uytt den Boogert (1996-1997)

=== M ===
- Angelique Marshall - Joyce Zuidgeest (2000)
- Tim Meeuws - Detective Hoogland (#1) (1996)
- Timon Moll - Michiel van den Brink (1996, 1997-2001)
- Antje Monteiro - Sandra van Steen (1996)
- Alex Mous - Police officier Bos (1996) / Detective LaFleur (1997)

=== N ===
- Jan Nonhof - Elmer de Bock (1996)

=== O ===
- Richard Oerlemans - Joost van den Abeelen (1998-1999)
- Valentijn Ouwens - Detective Hoogland (#2) (1996)

=== P ===
- Lex Passchier - Gijs Verdonk (1997)
- Hertje Peeck - Dokter van der Meer (1996, 1997)
- Peter Post - Roeland de Brauw (1998)
- Joris Putman - Tijmen Visser (2001)

=== R ===
- Roelant Radier - Oscar van Cloppenburg (#1) (1996)
- Mark Ram - Dennis (1996)
- Julian Rief - Gerant Bob
- Robin Rienstra - PK van Nispen (2000-2001)
- Yvonne Ristie - Cecilia Landvreugd
- Maja Robbesom - Jasmijn van Oosteinde
- Nienke Römer - Natasja Laroux (1996)

=== S ===
- Klaartje de Schepper - Sasha Lindeboom
- Bob Schwarze - Jan Willem Coolhaas
- Truus te Selle - Eugénie d'Harencourt (1996-1997)
- Jasmine Sendar - Bibi Zuidgeest (1999-2001)
- John Serkei - Aaron Zuidgeest (#2) (2000-2001)
- Wim Serlie - Huisbaas Wilmink (1997)
- Monique Sluyter - Maria Weevers (1998-1999)
- Koen Smit - Jeroen van Cloppenburg (1999-2001)
- Ella Snoep - Rita de Brink (1997)
- Guy Sonnen - Maurice d'Harencourt (1996)
- Cees Spanbroek - Onderdirecteur De Vries (1996) / Herman Veerman
- Jan Willem Sterneberg - Charles van Dam (1996-1997)
- Machteld Stolte - Brenda de Mol

=== T ===
- Ronald Top - Olivier van Eeden
- Bob van Tol - Anton Verweijden (1996-1997)

=== V ===
- Noah Valentyn - Samir Amarani (#1) (2000)
- Else Valk - Françoise Veeren (1996)
- Ellemieke Vermolen - Bo Donkers
- René Vernout - Wethouder van Amerongen (1996) / Oscar van Cloppenburg (#2)
- Chris Vinken - Bart Harding
- Leonid Vlassov - Konstantin Kolchev (1996, 1997)
- Marianne Vloetgraven - Sylvia Verweijden (1996-2000)
- David Vos - Docent van Ramesdonk (1996)
- Colin Vosveld - Nick Sterman (#2) (2000)

=== W ===
- Rutger Weemhoff - Henri van Cloppenburg (#1) (1996-1998)
- Dick Wempe - Butler Edward (1996-2001)
- Willem Westermann - Jan-Willem Dekker (1996)
- Rense Westra - Werner Heemskerk
- Daan Wijnands - Stan Mulder (1997)
- Ingrid Willemse - Hannah van Duynhoven
- Gepke Witteveen - Desirée van Cloppenburg (1996-2001)
- Dick Woudenberg - Benjamin Frederikse (1996)
- Edgar Wurfbain - Pieter Hardebol (1996-1999)

=== Z ===
- Michiel de Zeeuw - Tim d'Harencourt (1996-2000)
- Emmelie Zipson - Esther de Blauw
- Herman Zumpolle - Van Veen (1996)
- Hans Zuydveld - Kees Willemse (1996-1997) / Bernhard de Graaf

== DVD ==
Season	Episodes	DVD date	Episodes on DVD	Notes
1	1 t/m 65	20 November 2008	65	
2	66 t/m 240	23 April 2009	175	
3	241 t/m 440	16 December 2010	200	
4	441 t/m 640	27 April 2011	200	
5	641 t/m 805	17 oktober 2013	165	Episode 771 missing
6	806 t/m 925	??	120	One episode missing
