= 4 Fun =

Dutch boy band

- Genres: Pop
- Years active: 1997 – 1998
- Members: Jimmy Geduld; Winston Gerschtanowitz; Michiel de Zeeuw; Chris Zegers

4 Fun was a Dutch boy band consisting of Jimmy Geduld, Winston Gerschtanowitz, Michiel de Zeeuw and Chris Zegers. They were already known as soap opera actors. Jimmy Geduld had acted in Goede tijden, slechte tijden (in Dutch Good Times, Bad Times), both Winston Gerschtanowitz and Michiel de Zeeuw played in Goudkust (meaning Gold Coast in Dutch) and Chris Zegers was in Onderweg naar Morgen (meaning The way to tomorrow). The band was formed as a competition to the girl band trio Linda, Roos & Jessica also of in competition Goede tijden, slechte tijden.

In 1997 they had a Top 20 hit with the song "Levenslang" followed by "Overal" in 1998 in the Dutch charts. In 1998 the debut album Hittegolf (meaning Heatwave in Dutch) was released. Fun 4 disbanded after two years together.

== Discography ==
=== Albums ===
- 1998: Hittegolf (reached #23 in the Dutch Albums Chart)

=== Singles ===
- 1997: "Levenslang" (reached #14 in the Dutch Singles Chart)
- 1998: "Overal" (reached #25 in the Dutch Singles Chart)
- 1998: "Hittegolf"
