= HVY =

HVY may refer to:

- HeavyLift Cargo Airlines, a defunct Australian airline
- Helenium virus Y

== See also ==
- Heavy (disambiguation)
