= Super Heavy =

Super Heavy or Superheavy may refer to:

- Super heavy water
- Superheavy element
- SuperHeavy, a supergroup band, 2009–2011
  - SuperHeavy (album), the single 2011 album released by the band SuperHeavy
- SpaceX Super Heavy, the reusable first stage of the SpaceX Starship launch vehicle
  - List of Super Heavy boosters
- Super-heavy tank
- Super heavy-lift launch vehicle, the most capable class of orbital rockets

== See also ==
- Heavy (disambiguation)
