= Lingo (Canadian game show) =

- Genre: Game show
- Presented by: Paul Houde
- Country of origin: Canada
- No. of episodes: 439

Original release
- Network: Télévision de Radio-Canada
- Release: 1998 – 2001

Lingo is a Canadian game show that ran for 439 episodes on Télévision de Radio-Canada across Canada, from 1998 to 2001. It was hosted by longtime actor and radio/TV host Paul Houde. The show's format combined the structure of the game of chance known as bingo with a word guessing game; contestants took turns guessing five-letter words and tried to guess enough of them to fill in enough spaces on a five-by-five card to form a line.

== Main game ==
The object of the game is to score points by taking five guesses at a mystery five-letter word puzzle. If at any time a team makes a mistake, such as taking too long at a guess, misspelling a word, spelling a word that doesn't exist, spelling a word that is not five letters in length, repeats a word already guessed, or the word does not start with the established first letter, control passes over to the other team, who are given a free letter unless only one is missing. The team that guesses the correct word received $50.

== Lingo board ==
At the start of the match, both teams receive a Lingo board, with the red team playing with odd numbers and the green team playing with even numbers. 8 numbers are marked off each of their boards. Once a team successfully completes a word puzzle, they get the chance to pull two numbered balls (one per player) out of a hopper. Once they complete their Lingo board, by getting 5 in a row across, up or down, or diagonally, they get $100. If however they pull a black ball from the hopper, they lose their turn and control passes over to the other side. (The black ball is called in French "L'infâme boule noire!", which translates to "infamous black ball".)

== End of match ==
At some point during the match, a bell rang, signifying the match will end after the current puzzle in play. After the puzzle is solved and two balls pulled out, the team with the most money became the day's champions and goes on to the "No Lingo" bonus game. (The match will also end when either: (A) a team solves the puzzle but cannot make a Lingo as a new board requires Lingo to be made in as few as 3 pulls, or (B) when nobody solves the puzzle.) The runners-up receive a consolation prize.

== Tiebreaker ==
If the match ends in a tie, another five-letter puzzle will be played with the teams alternating lines until one of them correctly guesses the word and wins the match.

== No Lingo ==
The winners play the "No Lingo" bonus game in which they are presented with a new Lingo board with 12 numbers marked off. Before the first puzzle, they are guaranteed $50 regardless of what happens afterward. That $50 is doubled to $100 for the first puzzle. Puzzles in this part of the game are again 5-letter words with 2 letters given, the first letter of the word and a second letter somewhere else in the word. Each line used adds a Lingo ball to be drawn. If they fail to guess the word after the fifth line, they have to draw 6 balls (1 per each line plus an additional penalty ball because they completely missed the word). Once they make the required number of draws without getting Lingo, or getting a gold ball (known in French as "boule d'or") at any time (which ends that round of draws, but the ball goes back in the hopper for a future draw), they are given the option to take the $100 and quit, or continue on and play for double, going through the same procedure as before, right on up to the $1600 level. Should they avoid getting a Lingo at this point, they will return the next day to defend their championship. If there is any time left in the show, a "sprint" game for $100 a word will be played with only the first letter of each puzzle showing. However, if they do get a Lingo, they lose all the money they accumulated and go all the way back to $50, and then play the "sprint" game to build up as much money as possible until show's end. Also, by virtue of getting a Lingo here, they are retired as champions and two new teams compete the next day.

== See also ==
- Lingo (American game show)

== Notes ==
- Champions can stay on the show until they get a Lingo in the end game, they bail out in the end game, or are defeated by their opponents in the main game.
- This particular version of Lingo ended around the time when Game Show Network commissioned a new version in English with Chuck Woolery as host, with this Québécois version's main game rules (points) as the basis of its rules.
- The most any one team managed to win was $8900.
- A few changes in the main game later in the run saw the addition of wild card balls that corresponded to the team's colors (green ball for the green team, red ball for the red team). When drawn, they can take any number off the Lingo board, giving them a better shot at completing their card. (The current GSN version has a similar rule with question-mark balls.)
- Black balls in this version were red on the current GSN edition (which were called "stoppers", perhaps owing to a previous Woolery-hosted series, Scrabble).
- At one time, the completely gold ball used in the end game became a regular blue ball with a gold star.
- The dictionary used most often in the entire run was Le Petit Robert, which is a French-language dictionary.
- The judge's first name, seen on occasion for much of the run, was Roger (pronounced similar to that of "Roget's Thesaurus").
- The sprint record is 13; this occurred as the team "lingoed" during the first level of the bonus round, giving them ample time to play sprints.
- On at least one occasion time ran out for the day, before the team even had a chance to play the 5 levels of the bonus round. When this happens the team is given an exception and gets to return as champions despite not winning the $1,600 prize.
