= Van Asperen =

van Asperen is a Dutch surname meaning "from Asperen". It may refer to:

- Aart van Asperen (b. 1956), Dutch television director
- Bob van Asperen (b. 1947), Dutch harpsichordist
- Eelco van Asperen (1965–2013), Dutch computer scientist
- Janneke van Asperen (fl. 2020s), Dutch art historian and museum curator
- Gerrit Verdooren van Asperen (1757–1824), Dutch naval officer
