= Groeten uit de Rimboe =

Dutch reality television series

Groeten uit de Rimboe (Dutch: Greetings from the Jungle) is a Dutch reality television series produced by Eyeworks for SBS6. In the format, groups of people (families or celebrities, depending on the version) live a primitive life with members of tribes around the world, mainly in Africa.

== Premise ==
One Flemish and two Dutch families travel to indigenous tribes who still lead a fairly autarkic existence without much contact with the outside world to spend three weeks there. In the second series, Groeten Terug (Welcome Back), members of two of the three tribes paid a return visit to their guests in the Netherlands. The third tribe, the Tamberma, was denied permission to travel to Belgium at the last minute. In the third series, three new families visit. At the beginning of 2005, a completely Flemish version was already shown on VTM entitled Toast Kannibaal. The first two series attracted a million viewers. In 2019, a similar program will be broadcast under the name Cultuurshock, in which families live for a week with an indigenous people group who have a completely different culture than they do. They fully adapt to the customs of the people.

Shortly before the premiere of the Dutch series, Eyeworks put the format up for international sales under the name Ticket to the Tribes.

== Main series ==
=== Series 1 (Autumn 2005) ===
The first series premiered on 8 September 2005 and aired on Thursday nights.

- Hans and Monique Massing from Nootdorp with children Hans and Rachel visited the Himba tribe in Namibia. Hans and Monique have now divorced.
- Ton and Mieke Rentier from Hilversum with children Lisanne and Yannick visited the Mentawai tribe in Indonesia.
- Lode and Suzanne Bierkens from Mol with daughter Wenkce and sons Bram and Bavo visited the Tamberma tribe in Togo. This family had also previously been seen in the Flemish series Toast Kannibaal.

The same tribes were featured on the original Flemish version earlier in 2005. The Bierkens also shared their experience to Togolese television, during their stay at a hotel after filming had finished.

=== Series 2 (Autumn 2006) ===
The second series premiered on 21 October 2006, airing on Saturday nights.

- Ron and Claudia de Jonge with sons Danny and Jordy from Nieuw Bergen visited the Suraji tribe in Ethiopia.
- Peter and Clasien Bregman from Hem with daughters Rosa, Noortje, Sara, Maartje and Dieuwertje visited the Hagahai tribe in Papua New Guinea.
- The Laseure family with daughter Nikky and son Jeffrey from Belgium visited the Huaorani tribe in Ecuador.

=== Series 3 (Spring 2008) ===
The third season premiered on 29 March 2008, airing on Saturday nights.

- The Kazàn family was visiting the Samburu in Kenya. Hans Kazàn owned a hotel in Spain which went bankrupt in 2007.
- De Smet family, visiting the Mursi in Ethiopia.
- The De Leeuw family was visiting the Dogon in Mali.

=== Series 4 ===
The first episode of this season aired on October 27, 2010 and the last on December 8, 2010, airing on Wednesday nights. There was no episode on November 17, 2010, meaning this season has a total of six episodes.

- The Anin family, a Lilliputian family, visited the Zemba tribe in Namibia.
- The Ditsel family visited the rugged Bodi tribe in Ethiopia. This family participated in the Afvallers XXL program in 2007.

== Groeten Terug ==
After each season of the main series, SBS6 broadcast a successor to Groeten uit de Rimboe, called Groeten Terug.

=== Series 1 (Spring 2006) ===
- Himba members Chief (chief), Kateeko (Chief's first wife), Muundjua (Chief's second wife) and Tjiuojua (warrior) visited the Massing family.
- Mentawai members Teu Reun (medicine man), Martina (Teu Reun's wife), Menakki (their daughter), Pageta and Oro Sagu (warriors) visited the Rentier family.

=== Series 2 (Spring 2007) ===
- Suri's Bargudu (tribal chief), Haribula, Sabakana and the two women Kereng and Nakuraholi visited the de Jonge family.
- Hagahai's Sinale (tribal chief), his wife Nomi, Mea and the two boys Puya and Didiman visited the Bregman family.

=== Series 3 (Fall 2008) ===
- The Kazàn Family received four tribe members to visit.
- The De Leeuw Family received four tribe members to visit.
- The De Smet Family does not participate in this program.

=== Series 4 (Spring 2011) ===
In the fourth season of Groeten Terug, the tribes from the fourth season of the main series visit the Netherlands. The first episode of this season aired on April 9, 2011 and the eighth and final episode aired on May 28, 2011.

- The Ditsel family, from Rijssen in Twente, received a visit from the rugged Bodi tribe from Ethiopia.
- The Anin family, from Heerhugowaard, received a visit from the Zemba tribe from Namibia.

== Belgen in de Rimboe ==
After the second season of Groeten Terug, SBS6 broadcast Belgen in de Rimboe, where three Flemish families were followed with their adventures. They were previously featured in the Flemish version of Groeten uit de Rimboe, namely Toast Kannibaal.

- The Franken family consisting of Kurt, Jasmina and daughters Sarah, Charlotte and Astrid visited the Pokaja tribe in Papua New Guinea.
- The Beernaert family from Moorslede consisting of Franky, Nadine, daughter Marieke and sons Wannes and Corneel visited the Himba tribe in Namibia.
- The Deroo family from Grimbergen consisting of Marc, Marise, daughter Charlotte and son Lukas visited the Mentawai tribe in Indonesia.

== Criticism ==
In 2008, a cultural anthropologist from the University of Amsterdam showed that the indigenous tribes in the program were, in reality, less primitive than the makers of the program would lead the viewer believe. According to him, the program is recorded via a script. He also noticed that the Namibian Himba people that routinely appeared in the series (which was the primary goal of his visit) spoke English, drank cola and alcohol, used cellphones and drove cars. Other "Western influences", such as the problems with AIDS, alcoholism and having a bank account had to be excluded as long as the tribes were able to follow the script's rules.

== International adaptations ==
=== Australia ===
The Lost Tribes aired on the Nine Network for one series in 2007.

=== Brazil ===
The Brazilian version, Perdidos na Tribo, aired on Rede Bandeirantes in 2012. It lasted for a single season from April 13, 2012 to June 4, 2012.

=== New Zealand ===
The New Zealand version of Ticket to the Tribes aired on TV2 for one season in 2007. In addition to the Himba and Mentawai tribes visited in other versions, there was also a Zulu tribe in South Africa. In this version, the Andrews family from Tauranga visited the Zulu tribe, the Sim family from Invercargill visited the Himba tribe and the Smith family from Greymouth visited the Mentawai tribe. Ngā Taonga Sound & Vision holds the archives of the version.

=== Norway ===
Den store reisen (The Great Journey) aired for two seasons on NRK1 in 2008 and 2010. The first episode of the first series was seen by 806,000 viewers, while the season finale was watched by 1,166,000 viewers. As with other versions, certain Western elements had to be taken away from the tribes during filming. Writing for Ny Tid, Waorani specialist Laura Rival said in an investigation in 2008 (when the first series was on air) that the Waoranis of Ecuador had to take off whatever Western-style clothes they had in order to make the series more thought-provoking.

=== Portugal ===
The Portuguese version, Perdidos na Tribo aired on TVI for only one celebrity season (Perdidos na Tribo Famosos) from 8 May to 17 July 2011. Instead of inviting families, groups of celebrities (four per tribe) were featured. The series was presented by Leonor Poeiras. TVI justified the format as a means to counter the economical crisis Portugal was facing at the time.
