= Viaplay TV =

Dutch sports television channel

- Country: Netherlands
- Broadcast area: Netherlands
- Headquarters: Amsterdam, Netherlands

Programming
- Picture format: 1080p HDTV (downscaled to 16:9 576i for the SDTV feed)

Ownership
- Owner: Viaplay Group

History
- Launched: 5 April 2024; 2 years ago

Links
- Website: www.viaplay.com/nl

Availability

Streaming media
- Ziggo GO: ZiggoGO.tv (Europe only)
- KPN iTV Online: Watch live (Europe only)

Viaplay TV is a Dutch commercial sports television channel owned by Viaplay Group. The channel was launched on SBS9 on 5 April 2024. On 14 March 2025, it started broadcasting on its own position, and started a supplementary premium service.

== History ==
=== On SBS9's slot ===
On 2 April 2024, Viaplay Group announced a partnership with Talpa under which SBS9 was renamed Viaplay TV effective 5 April. The channel was used to cross-promote the Viaplay streaming service by featuring broadcasts of selected sports properties from the service, such as Formula One, PDC darts, and Premier League football.

=== Own channel ===
On 14 March 2025, in anticipation for the start of the 2025 Formula One season, the channel split into 2, with the Viaplay TV name becoming a cable sports channel, while the former Viaplay TV channel position reverted to SBS9. Viaplay TV also launched a premium channel, Viaplay TV+, initially available on ODIDO and DELTA, starting on the same day.
