= Heavies =

Heavies may refer to multiple instances of:

- Heavy artillery
- Heavy cavalry
- Heavy cruisers
- Villains, also called "heavies"

== See also ==
- Heavy (disambiguation)
