= Gepke Witteveen =

Dutch actress and director

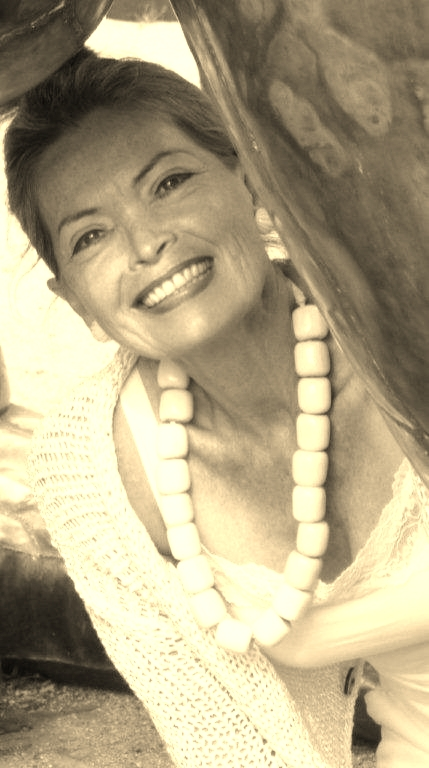
- Born: Gepke Marijke Witteveen; 11 September 1951 (age 74); Tandjungkarang, Indonesia
- Other names: Gepke Haakma
- Education: Academie voor Podiumvorming
- Occupations: Actor, Director, Owner of Première Parterre
- Partner: Jaap Broekmans

Gepke Marijke Witteveen (born 11 September 1951, in Tandjungkarang, Indonesia), also known as Gepke Haakma, is a Dutch actress and director.

== Education ==
Witteveen was educated at the Academie voor Podiumvorming in The Hague.

== Career ==
=== As actor ===
After completing school, Witteveen performed with several theatre groups and had various guest roles in Goede tijden, slechte tijden, Bureau Kruislaan and Diamant.

In 1996, she played Desirée van Cloppenburg in the daily soap opera Goudkust. She was the only actor with the show for its entire run, ending in 2001.

She appeared in the film Ver van familie (2008) with Katja Schuurman and Camilla Siegertsz.

In late 2008, she played Noortje Warmerdam in Pauwen en Reigers ("Peacocks and Herons").

In the early 2010s, she had roles in De avonturen van Kruimeltje and Olifantenvoeten, then took a hiatus from acting. In 2018, she returned to the screen as Dominique de Bree in #Forever.

=== Entrepreneur, director ===
Witteveen created the personal training program Hier en Nu. She founded the Haagse Kringen with Hans Steijger, Harry Mertens, Meike van der Linde, André van den Berg and Daniëlle Louis, and founded her own theatre, Première Parterre, in 2005.

In May 2017, she directed De absolute vrijheid for Het Portret Spreekt, a play by Belle van Zuylen, translated by Carel Alphenaar and Hanna Laus; and directed another van Zuylen play, De edelman.

On 17 November 2018, Witteveen participated in the Indië Monologen ("Indies Monologues") at the theatre De Muze in Noordwijk. It was later produced as Indische Essenties ("Indonesian Essentials") at Première Parterre.
