= Heavy =

Heavy may refer to:

== Measures ==
- Heavy, a characterization of objects with substantial weight
- Heavy, a wake turbulence category used by pilots and air traffic controllers to refer to aircraft with a maximum takeoff mass of 136,000 kg or more
- Heavy, a type of strength of Scottish beer

== Arts and entertainment ==
=== Music ===
==== Groups ====
- The Heavy (band), a rock band from England

==== Albums ====
- Heavy (Heavy D album), 1999
- Heavy (Iron Butterfly album), a 1968 album by Iron Butterfly
- Heavy (Bin-Jip album), the second studio album by Bin-Jip
- Heavy (Sir album), 2024

==== Songs ====
- "Heavy" (Collective Soul song), 1999
- "Heavy" (Lauri Ylönen song), 2011
- "Heavy" (Linkin Park song), 2017
- "Heavy" (Anne-Marie song), 2017
- "Heavy", by Cxloe, 2020
- "Heavy", by Flight Facilities featuring Your Smith, 2021
- "Heavy", by Peach PRC, 2021
- "Heavy", by Shawn Mendes from Shawn, 2024
- "Heavy", by Theory of a Deadman from Savages, 2014
- "Heavy", from the 1981 musical Dreamgirls and the 2006 film adaptation

=== Television ===
- Heavy (TV series), reality show on A&E that chronicles extreme weight loss
- Heavy: The Story of Metal, a four-part documentary special that aired on VH1 in 2006
- "Heavy" (House), a 2005 episode of the television series House

=== Other arts and entertainment ===
- Heavy (film), a 1995 drama film
- Heavy or villain, the antagonist within a story
- Heavy Weapons Guy or Heavy, a class in the first-person shooter Team Fortress 2

== Sports ==
- Heavy (website), an American sports news website
- Walter Blair (baseball) (1883–1948), American baseball player nicknamed "Heavy"

== See also ==
- The Heavy (disambiguation)
- Heavy D (disambiguation)
- Heavy Heavy, a 2023 studio album by the Scottish indie group Young Fathers
- Heavies (disambiguation)
