= Moordfeest =

- Genre: Reality game show
- Presented by: Hans Kesting
- Country of origin: Netherlands
- No. of seasons: 2
- No. of episodes: 13

Production
- Running time: 90 minutes
- Production company: ITV Studios Netherlands

Original release
- Network: SBS6
- Release: 16 December 2023 – present

Moordfeest (English: "Death feast") is a Dutch reality game show broadcast on SBS6 since 2023, hosted by Hans Kesting. The show is sold internationally as "A Party to Die For".

== Gameplay ==
In each episode, seven celebrities attend an event, such as a premiere or wedding, at a special location, and one of them murders one of the other guests (the 'murderer' spins a wheel to decide the victim). The other contestants have to act as detectives and uncover the murderer within two days. The contestants may choose whether or not to share information, as only one wins the title of 'Best detective'.

If multiple contestants solve the murder, the tie is broken on how many of the questions asked on the final assignment were answered correctly.

Viewers can also play along by scanning a QR code that appears on-screen and answering questions that appear on the show's website. Those who solve the murder can win up to €10,000, with contestants having a greater chance of winning for answering more questions correctly.

== Series ==
Series	Episodes	Start	End	Average ratings
Pilot	1	16 December 2023		901,000
1	6	17 August 2024	21 September 2024	648,333
2	6	4 January 2026	8 February 2026	644,833

== International versions ==
Country	Name	Host	Channel	Dates	Notes
France	Murder party au Musée	Francis Huster	M6	16 July 2025 – present	
Spain	Una fiesta de muerte	Àngel Llàcer	Antena 3	25 April 2026 – present	
