= Heavy D (disambiguation) =

Heavy D (1967-2011) was a Jamaican-American rapper, singer, and actor.

Heavy D may also refer to:

== People ==
- Colin Newell (1973–2020), British reality television personality who was known as Heavy D
- Dave 'Heavy D' Sparks, a nickname for mechanic David Sparks, a member of the Diesel Brothers
- Don "Heavy D" Harris, a nickname of professional wrestler Don Harris from The Harris Brothers

== Other uses ==
- Heavy D!, character in the videogame series The King of Fighters

== See also ==
- Heavy (disambiguation)
- D (disambiguation)
