= Stacey Hayes =

British actress (born 1976)

- Born: 10 August 1976 (age 50); London, England
- Occupations: Actress; comedian; model; spokesperson; television personality
- Years active: 1993–present

Stacey Hayes (born 10 August 1976) is an English soap opera and comedy actress, model, spokeswoman, and ice-skater. She was born in London, England and raised in Nebraska, United States.

== Career ==
She has appeared in many magazines, television shows and movies including soap operas such as Days of Our Lives and The Young and the Restless, as well as primetime shows such as Las Vegas and Boston Legal. She has also tried her hand at stand-up comedy work at The Comedy Store, which helped her join as co-host for the 3rd season of Chuck Woolery's Lingo.

Recently, she has periodically made cameo appearances in Spike TV's show MANswers. She also appears as a pitchperson with model/actress Carmen Palumbo on internet entrepreneur/television personality Jeff Paul's Internet Millions infomercial nationally, as well as other "get rich quick" infomercials as of late 2010.

== Partial filmography ==
=== Television ===
- Cry Wolfe (1 episode, 2015) as Victoria
- Official Best of (2 episodes, 2011–2012) as Host
- MANswers (7 episodes, 2007–2008) as Hottie On Treadmill / Pretty Woman / Hot Blonde Girl / Beach Babe / Watermelon's / Massage Therapist / Nagging Girl
- Boston Legal (1 episode, 2006) as Model #1
- Gene Simmons Family Jewels (1 episode, 2006) as Dancer
- Las Vegas (1 episode, 2005) as Porn Star
- Howard Stern (2 episodes, 2005) as herself
- Casting Ripe Live (2005) as Co-Host
- The Captain and Casey Show (1 episode, 2004) as Sexy Drink Girl
- Lingo (65 episodes, 2003–2004) as Co-Host
- The Real Roseanne Show (1 episode, 2003) as Model
- Passions (2 episodes, 2002) as Maid / Clerk
- Talk Soup (1 episode, 2001) as Unknown
- Pajama Party (13 episodes, 2000) as Dancer
- The Tonight Show with Jay Leno (1 episode, 2000) as Miss Texas
- Later (1 episode, 2000) as Lotto Girl
- Sunset Beach (2 episodes, 1999) as Flight Attendant

=== Film ===
- Ghosts of the Abyss (2003) as herself (voice)
- Sunset Strip (2000) as Groupie (uncredited)
- Gun Shy (2000) as Hot Girl (uncredited)
- The Debtors (1999) as Sexy Casino Waitress

=== Video game ===
- Cy Girl (2004) (VG) as Coffy (voice)
- Road Rash (1997) (VG) as Racing Driver #5 / Trophy Awarding #4 (voice)

Preceded by Randy Thomas (off-camera announcer, 2002-03)	Announcer/Co-host of Lingo; 2003–2004	Succeeded by Shandi Finnessey (2005–2007)
