= Het Blok =

- Genre: Reality
- Based on: The Block
- Country of origin: Netherlands

Original release
- Network: Net5
- Release: 2004

Het Blok is a Dutch reality series running since 2004 on NET 5. The program is based on the Australian series The Block.

The program shows 4 couples who have 77 days to build and model an apartment. The construction happens while the couples hold their regular day jobs, so only evenings and weekends are available to the couples. They are each given a €30,000 budget with which to buy supplies, such as paint and lighting supplies. Every two weeks, the couples must have one room of their apartment ready for judgement. A jury reviews the rooms that are finished and the winner of each judging get an extra prize (usually extra money).

After 77 days, each apartment is judged as a whole, and the apartments are valuated. The couples win the difference between this value and the start-value, which the apartment had, before they started the renovation. The couple who has the apartment that has risen the most in value wins an extra €50,000. The end values are determined by an auction.

== Seasons 1 through 4 ==
In 2004 and 2005, both apartment complexes were located somewhere in Amsterdam.

In 2006, the format of the show has changed to add extra tension to the show. In this new format, there are again four apartments to be built - but five couples to build it. Couples will go through various contests to see who will build which apartment, and who will eventually be asked to leave.

The 4th season, running from September 2007, shows a new location as Het Blok has moved to Haarlem. Supposedly the series has returned to its original format, leaving out the surprises that were introduced in the third season.

New series is filmed in Amsterdam (Newtonstraat 99).
