= The Lost Tribes (TV series) =

2007 Australian-New Zealand reality series

- Created by: Nine Network; TVNZ
- Country of origin: Australia
- No. of episodes: 6

Production
- Running time: approx 60 minutes (plus commercials)

Original release
- Network: Channel Nine
- Release: 6 May – 10 June 2007

The Lost Tribes is an Australian reality television series produced by the Nine Network and TVNZ. The series premiere on Channel Nine was broadcast on Sunday, 6 May 2007 at 6:30pm, prior to the telecast of the 2007 TV Week Logie Awards. The show is narrated by Charles Wooley. The series is an adaptation of the Dutch format Groeten uit de Rimboe, also known as Ticket to the Tribes. The network started picking potential families in December 2006.

The series places two families from Sydney and one family from Melbourne with indigenous tribal communities in South Africa, Namibia, and Indonesia. The series aims to document the culture shock each family goes through in their new environment.

The series was repeated late Thursday nights in late 2010.
