= SBS9 =

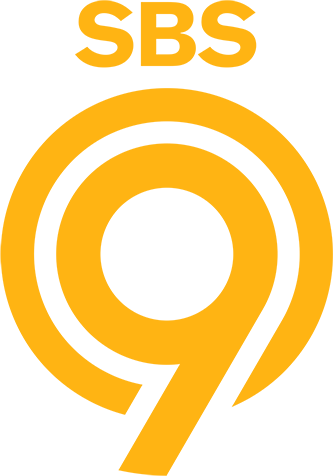
- Country: Netherlands
- Broadcast area: Netherlands
- Headquarters: Amsterdam, Netherlands

Programming
- Picture format: 1080p HDTV (downscaled to 16:9 576i for the SDTV feed)

Ownership
- Owner: Talpa Network
- Parent: Talpa TV
- Sister channels: SBS6; Net5; Veronica

History
- Launched: 1 January 2015; 11 years ago
- Former names: Viaplay TV (2024-2025)

Links
- Website: www.sbs9.nl

Availability

Terrestrial
- Digitenne: Channel 19 (HD)

Streaming media
- Ziggo GO: ZiggoGO.tv (Europe only)
- KPN iTV Online: Watch live (Europe only)

SBS9 is a Dutch commercial television channel owned by Talpa Network through Talpa TV. The channel was launched on 1 January 2015 at 12:00 CET with a movie marathon. The channel can be received via all television providers in the Netherlands. Other channels of the group in the Netherlands are SBS6, Net5 and Veronica. It is considered Talpa Network's "catch-up" programming network. It was replaced by the first version of Viaplay TV on 5 April 2024, but resumed operating on 14 March 2025, when Viaplay TV started broadcasting a standalone channel.

== History ==
SBS Broadcasting announced its plans for a launch of a fourth channel in the Netherlands already in 2009. On 22 August 2014, the company officially released its definite plans for a new channel targeting female viewers. The channel got its name SBS9 on 27 September 2014. The launch date was set in January 2015.

For the 2015-2016 UEFA Champions League season, it was decided that Hart van Nederland and Shownieuws would be broadcast on the channel whenever SBS6 aired a match. The first time this arrangement happened, on 19 August 2015, saw the channel attracting a record high audience of 400,000 viewers tuning in for both. Piet Paulusma's weather forecast (Piets Weerbericht) attracted 429,000 viewers, 9% of the audience share.

On 10 April 2017, Talpa Holding acquired a 67% stake from Sanoma Media Netherlands.

On 2 April 2024, Viaplay Group announced a partnership with Talpa under which the channel was renamed Viaplay TV on 5 April. The channel cross-promoted the Viaplay streaming service by featuring broadcasts of selected sports properties from the service, such as Formula One, PDC darts, and Premier League football.

On 14 March 2025, Viaplay TV was relaunched as a standalone channel under Viaplay Group ownership, and SBS9 returned to air with its previous focus on films, imported American sitcoms, and repeats of SBS6's original productions.

== Programming ==
Mainly films and television series, at launch, every day of the week a different theme:

- Mondays: Various
- Tuesdays: Comedy
- Wednesdays: Action
- Thursdays: Drama
- Fridays: Family
- Saturdays: Thriller
- Sundays: Romance
