= Aart van Asperen =

Dutch television director (born 1956)

Aart van Asperen (born 16 August 1956) is a Dutch television director from Utrecht, Netherlands. He has directed several episodes of popular Dutch soap operas, including Goede tijden, slechte tijden and Goudkust.

In addition to his television work, van Asperen has also been involved with various humanitarian causes, contributing to organizations such as Amnesty International.
