= The Heavy =

The Heavy may refer to:

- The Heavy (album), the second album by American post-grungeband U.P.O.
- The Heavy (band), an indie rock band from Bath, England
- The Heavy (film), a 2010 thriller film
- The Heavy, a playable class from the video game mod Team Fortress
- Heavy (Team Fortress 2), a playable class from the video game Team Fortress 2
