= Veronica TV =

Commercial TV channel in the Netherlands

Veronica
- Country: Netherlands
- Broadcast area: Netherlands
- Headquarters: Amsterdam, Netherlands

Programming
- Picture format: 1080p (HDTV); 576i (SDTV 16:9)

Ownership
- Owner: Talpa Network
- Parent: Talpa TV
- Sister channels: SBS6; Net5; SBS9

History
- Launched: 1 May 1995; 31 years ago
- Former names: TV10 Gold (1995–1996); TV10 (1996–1998); Fox (1998–1999, 2000–2001); Fox 8 (1999–2000); V8 (2001–2003)

Links
- Website: veronicatv.nl (redirects to kijk.nl)

Availability

Terrestrial
- Digitenne: Channel 9 (HD)

Streaming media
- Ziggo GO: ZiggoGO.tv (Europe only)
- KPN iTV Online: Watch live (Europe only)
- TV Vlaanderen: Watch live

Veronica is a Dutch free-to-air commercial television channel currently a part of Talpa TV (Talpa Network). The channel was launched as TV10 Gold on 1 May 1995, then became TV10, Fox, Fox 8 and V8, before becoming Veronica on 20 September 2003. The channel is dedicated to young adults (13-35 demographic) and the male audience.

Veronica is time-sharing with Disney Jr., with the former broadcasting in daytime and the latter at night time. The practice began when Saban International bought TV10 in January 1997, and launched a Fox Kids slot on the channel. Before May 1, 2025, Disney XD was broadcast on the timeslot.

It is not to be confused with the Veronica Association (Dutch: Vereniging Veronica).

== History ==
=== TV10 Gold and TV10 (1995-1998) ===
In 1995, Dutch media company Arcade launched two television channels in the Netherlands: The Music Factory, a competing music channel for MTV, and TV10 Gold which launched on 1 May 1995. TV10 Gold's programming focused on reruns of classic TV series such as Dynasty, Fantasy Island, James Herriot, Hill Street Blues, Are You Being Served?, The Monkees, The Onedin Line, Sanford and Son, Bergerac and Colditz.

In 1996, TV10 Gold became part of the second largest Dutch media corporation Wegener Arcade. On 1 January 1996, Arcade merged with publishing company Wegener. In the first quarter of 1996, TV10 Gold changed into just TV10 to modernize its image. British sitcoms such as 'Allo 'Allo! and You Rang, M'Lord? remained part of the programming, along with the American TV series M*A*S*H.

In January 1997, Saban International bought TV10 and partnered with Holland Media Groep. Fox/Saban's Fox Kids was introduced in the Netherlands, time-sharing with TV10. Within the year, the partnership ended and Holland Media Groep's shares of TV10 were bought by Fox.

=== Fox and Fox 8 (1998-2001) ===
On 19 December 1998, TV10 was rebranded into Fox. Rupert Murdoch's Fox International Channels wanted to expand in Europe and through its cooperation with Saban it could make its first try-outs in the Netherlands with TV10. Popular TV series such as Sex and the City, Dawson's Creek, Malcolm in the Middle and Charmed premiered on the channel. Fox became Fox 8 in September 1999, but it rebranded back to Fox in September 2000. However, Fox could not get rid of TV10's image as an old-fashioned rerun channel.

In 2001, SBS Broadcasting B.V., then the Dutch branch of the SBS Broadcasting Group, bought the channel from the News Corporation.

21st Century Fox (the legal successor of the original News Corporation) later launched the second incarnation of Fox on 19 August 2013 through Eredivisie Media & Marketing CV, in which Fox Networks Group Benelux has a 51% share.

=== V8 (2001-2003) ===
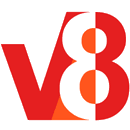
The logo of V8

SBS, having bought the channel from News Corporation, renamed it into V8 on 1 May 2001 in anticipation of Veronica. Earlier in 2000 Veronica Association announced that it would leave the Holland Media Groep and wanted to start a channel of its own. SBS and Veronica could not get an agreement and it would take more than two years before both parties closed a deal.

V8 was focused to young adults. The channel mainly broadcast action series, action films and erotic programmes late at night.

=== Veronica (2003-present) ===
Eventually, Veronica Association closed a deal with SBS, and V8 was rebranded as Veronica on 20 September 2003.

The German ProSiebenSat.1 Media took over SBS Broadcasting Group (including its Dutch activities) on 27 June 2007. In 2011, all of SBS's activities in the Netherlands (through SBS Broadcasting B.V.), including the three TV stations (SBS6, Net5 and Veronica), the two TV guides (Veronica Magazine and Totaal TV), production, design and text activities were sold to a joint venture between Sanoma Media Netherlands (67%) and Talpa Media Holding (33%).

On 10 April 2017 Talpa Holding acquired a 67% stake from Sanoma Media Netherlands.

== Disney Jr. ==
The daytime slot for children broadcast on Veronica began as Fox Kids when Saban bought TV10 in January 1997. The slot since rebranded to Jetix and then to Disney XD. On May 1, 2025, the daytime slot was replaced by the preschool channel Disney Jr.
