= Net5 =

Dutch commercial TV channel

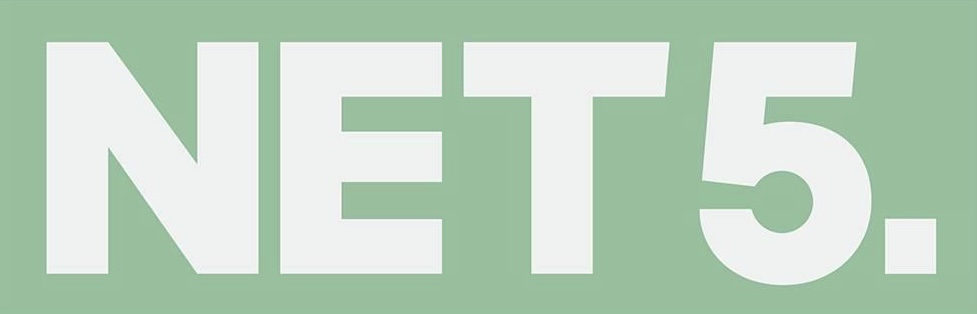
- Country: Netherlands
- Broadcast area: Netherlands
- Headquarters: Amsterdam, Netherlands

Programming
- Picture format: 1080p HDTV (downscaled to 16:9 576i for the SDTV feed)

Ownership
- Owner: Talpa Network
- Parent: Talpa TV
- Sister channels: SBS6; Veronica; SBS9

History
- Launched: 1 March 1999; 27 years ago

Links
- Website: www.net5.nl

Availability

Terrestrial
- Digitenne: Channel 8 (HD)

Streaming media
- Ziggo GO: ZiggoGO.tv (Europe only)
- KPN iTV Online: Watch live (Europe only)

Net5 is a Dutch free-to-cable commercial TV channel and is part of Talpa TV, formerly a part of SBS Broadcasting B.V. and now owned by Talpa Network. Other channels of the group in the Netherlands are SBS6, Veronica, and SBS9. It is aimed at high-educated female viewers. The station broadcasts various series, reality shows, and films.

== History ==
Net5 was launched by the SBS Broadcasting Group as their second commercial channel in the Netherlands next to SBS6. The head of SBS was Fons van Westerloo who left the company to work until 31 January 2008 to head the main competitor RTL Nederland (part of the RTL Group). Van Westerloo announced the new broadcast on 4 December 1998. It was supposed to become a commercial version of the Netherlands Public Broadcasting, being positioned as a higher quality television network, having already acquired British drama series, American series, Channel 4 documentaries and feature films. Nederland 1 manager Joop Daalmeijer considered Net5 to be "the greatest marketing success of the year", as the channel was poised to compete against it, but was also seen with scepticism, as in order to build a stable foothold, the channel would carry a solid base of Dutch programming, which was limited to less 15% of the airtime. Net5 was launched on 1 March 1999 and the first broadcast was the film Braveheart.

Since there were not that many commercial channels at the time, the Net5 brand was partly chosen to compete directly with the RTL 5 channel. The goal was for viewers to put Net5 on position 5 of their remote control settings instead of the older channel RTL 5. But research showed that more people would place RTL 5 on five, and Net5 on position nine.

From January 2000 to August 2002, Net5 shared its channel with the children's channel Kindernet. Kindernet broadcast from the early morning until 15.00.

The ProSiebenSat.1 Media took over the parent company, SBS Broadcasting Group, on 27 June 2007. In 2011, all of SBS's activities in the Netherlands (through SBS Broadcasting B.V.), including the three TV stations (SBS6, Net5 and Veronica), the two TV guides (Veronica Magazine and Totaal TV), production, design and text activities were sold to a joint venture between Sanoma Media Netherlands (67%) and Talpa Holding (33%).

On 10 April 2017, Talpa Holding acquired a 67% stake from Sanoma Media Netherlands.

== Programming ==
Net5 is a television station aimed at high-educated female viewers. The station broadcasts various series, reality shows and films.

=== Series ===
- $h*! My Dad Says
- 2 Broke Girls
- 2 Nuts and a Richard!
- 3 lbs
- 3rd Rock from the Sun
- 666 Park Avenue
- 90210
- Accidentally on Purpose
- According to Jim
- Alcatraz
- All About the Andersons
- Ally McBeal
- Amas de Casa Desesperadas
- American Crime Story
- American Dad!
- Angel
- Angela's Eyes
- Army Wives
- Archer
- Baby Daddy
- Beauty & the Beast
- Being Erica
- Betty in New York
- Big Love
- The Blacklist
- Bob's Burgers
- Body of Proof
- Boomtown
- Buffy the Vampire Slayer
- Bull
- Carnivàle
- Caroline in the City
- Castle
- The Catch
- Charmed
- Chicago Fire
- Chicago Med
- Chicago P.D.
- The Class
- Close to Home
- The Closer
- Code Black
- Cold Case
- Common Law
- Conviction
- Coroner
- Cougar Town
- Crash Canyon
- Criminal Minds
- Crossbones
- Crossing Jordan
- CSI: Crime Scene Investigation
- CSI: Miami
- CSI: NY
- Dallas
- Dawson's Creek
- The Defenders
- Desperate Housewives
- Desperate Housewives Africa
- Dirt
- Dirty Sexy Money
- Doc
- The Doctors
- Early Edition
- Eastwick
- Ed
- Elementary
- Eleventh Hour
- Eli Stone
- Emily Owens, M.D.
- ER
- Evelien
- Everwood
- Everybody Hates Chris
- Everyday Gourmet with Justine Schofield
- Extant
- Family Guy
- Fleabag
- Forever
- The Forgotten
- Freaks and Geeks
- Friends
- Fringe
- Fugget About It
- Futurama
- GCB
- Ghost Whisperer
- A Gifted Man
- Gilmore Girls
- The Good Wife
- Gone
- Gossip Girl
- Goudkust
- Grand Designs
- Grey's Anatomy
- The Guardian
- Happily Divorced
- Hart of Dixie
- Hawaii Five-0
- Hawthorne
- Heavy
- Home and Away
- Hostages
- Hotel Babylon
- House
- How to Get Away with Murder
- I'm with Her
- Jane the Virgin
- Jesse
- Judging Amy
- Justice
- King
- King & Maxwell
- King of the Hill
- The L Word
- Law & Order
- Law & Order: Criminal Intent
- Law & Order: Special Victims Unit
- Law & Order: Trial by Jury
- Law & Order: UK
- The Listener
- Lost
- Love, Inc.
- Love It or List It Australia
- Love My Way
- Lovespring International
- Lupin the 3rd Part IV: The Italian Adventure
- Madam Secretary
- Magnum P.I.
- Major Crimes
- Manifest
- McLeod's Daughters
- Medium
- Men in Trees
- Missing
- Miss Farah
- Mistresses
- Mistresses UK
- Monk
- Moonlight
- The Mysteries of Laura
- NCIS
- NCIS: Los Angeles
- NCIS: New Orleans
- NCIS: Sydney
- Neighbours
- New Amsterdam
- Newton's Cradle
- The Nine
- Nip/Tuck
- Notes from the Underbelly
- Numbers
- Nurses
- The O.C.
- October Road
- The Odd Couple
- Off the Map
- Once Upon a Time
- One Tree Hill
- Packed to the Rafters
- The Palace
- Pan Am
- Person of Interest
- Poldark
- Private Practice
- Privileged
- Providence
- Pulling
- Pushing Daisies
- Raising the Bar
- Ready Steady Cook
- Reign
- Related
- Revenge
- RFDS
- Rick and Morty
- Ringer
- Rizzoli & Isles
- Rita Rocks
- Robot Chicken
- The Rookie
- Rookie Blue
- Roseanne
- Rules of Engagement
- Samantha Who?
- Scandal
- Secret Bridesmaids' Business
- Sex and the City
- The Shannara Chronicles
- Shenmue: The Animation
- Smallville
- Solar Opposites
- The Sopranos
- South Park
- Spin City
- Star Trek: Voyager
- Station 19
- Strong Medicine
- Suddenly Susan
- Sullivan's Crossing
- Summerland
- Supernatural
- Switched at Birth
- Take Two
- Two Guys and a Girl
- Two Twisted
- The Vampire Diaries
- Ugly Betty
- Undercovers
- The War at Home
- What About Brian
- The Whole Truth
- Who's the Boss?
- Wildfire
- Will & Grace
- Without a Trace
- Women's Murder Club
- The X-Files
- Yes, Dear
- Your Honor

=== Reality shows ===
- Amish in the City
- The Bachelor
- The Bachelorette
- The Block
- The Block NZ
- Bondi Rescue
- The Chopping Block
- Crime Scene Kitchen
- Extreme Makeover: Home Edition
- Gordon Ramsay's 24 Hours to Hell and Back
- Got to Dance
- Gut Job
- Hell's Kitchen USA
- Het Blok
- HGTV Design Star
- House Rules
- I Shouldn't Be Alive
- The Island
- Junior MasterChef
- Junior MasterChef Australia
- Kourtney and Khloé Take Miami
- The Little Couple
- Little People, Big World
- Love It or List It
- MasterChef
- MasterChef: The Professionals
- MasterChef Australia
- MasterChef Australia: The Professionals
- MasterChef Australia All-Stars
- MasterChef Canada
- MasterChef Junior USA
- MasterChef South Africa
- MasterChef USA
- Masters of Flip
- Mobbed
- Mr. Romance
- My Kitchen Rules
- My Kitchen Rules NZ
- The Only Way Is Essex
- Peking Express
- Pineapple Dance Studios
- The Real Housewives
- Say Yes to the Dress
- Secret Story
- Surf Patrol
- Trinny & Susannah Undress...
- What Not to Wear
