= Paul Houde =

Canadian actor and radio-television presenter (1954–2024)

- Born: 25 August 1954; Saint-Laurent, Quebec, Canada
- Died: 2 March 2024 (aged 69)
- Education: École polytechnique de Montréal; Université de Montréal (B.Sc.)
- Occupation(s): Actor; Radio-television presenter

Paul Houde (25 August 1954 – 2 March 2024) was a Canadian actor and radio-television presenter.

== Career ==
=== Radio ===
Houde began working in radio in 1975 with CKAC 730 AM. He later worked for CKMF-FM and CFGL-FM. In 2007, he became host of CHMP-FM 98.5. On 9 January 2019, Cogeco announced that he would leave his show at the end of the season. From 2022 to 2023, he hosted a show on CKLX-FM.

=== Television ===
Houde presented a variety of shows on Ici Radio-Canada Télé, TVA, TQS, and Télé-Québec. He co-hosted the game show Le Cercle with Charles Lafortune. He also appeared in the TV series Les Boys. He also took part in the program 3600 secondes d'extase on Radio-Canada alongside Marc Labrèche.

== Personal life and family ==
Born in Saint-Laurent on 25 August 1954, Houde was the son of Aline Achim and Paul Houde Senior, a saxophonist. He had a sister named Johanne and a brother, longtime Montreal Canadiens television announcer Pierre. He studied at the École polytechnique de Montréal and the Université de Montréal. He married Francine Audette on 10 July 1982 with whom he had two sons, Karl and Paul-Frédéric. He became a grandfather on 6 August 2017 with the birth of his grandson Léni Paul Arnaud Xavier Houde, the son of Karl and singer Ariane Zita. His grandson's godfather is Hugo Mudie, lead singer of punk band The Sainte Catherines.

In 2023, Houde disclosed his diagnosis of autism.

=== Death ===
Paul Houde died following complications from surgery on 2 March 2024, at the age of 69.

== Filmography ==
- Bye Bye (1976–1983)
- Les Boys (1997)
- Les Boys 2 (1998)
- Winter Stories (1999)
- Les Boys 3 (2001)
- Les Boys 4 (2005)
