= Heavy (TV series) =

2011 American television series

- Genre: Documentary
- Country of origin: United States
- Original language: English
- No. of seasons: 1
- No. of episodes: 12

Production
- Running time: 60 minutes

Original release
- Network: A&E Network
- Release: January 17 – April 4, 2011

Heavy is an American documentary series that airs on A&E. The series chronicles the weight loss efforts of people suffering from severe obesity. It ran for one season, from January 17 to April 4, 2011.

== Overview ==
Each 60-minute episode chronicles six months in the lives of two people who are facing life-threatening health consequences as a result of their obesity. In episodes 1 through 5, the individuals are sent to a fitness camp in Texas for the first month, undergoing a strict program of diet and exercise and learning to change their attitudes about food. For the remaining five months, they continue to lose weight at home with the help of personal trainers, but, they can be called back to the camp if periodic weigh-ins reveal that they are not making progress. There are no weigh-ins during the sixth month (except for the last day), with the goal of encouraging the participants to make the transition back to daily life outside of the weight loss program.

Starting with episode 6, the two individuals spend the entire six months at a fitness camp on Hilton Head Island, South Carolina. Episode 12 was a revisit to some of the Texas participants.

== Episode list ==
=== Season 1: 2011 ===
No.	Title	Original release date
1	"Tom Arnold/Jodi Gleed"	January 17, 2011
The premiere episode features Tom and Jodi, both 37-year-olds from Houston, Texas. Tom starts at 5'9" and 638 pounds (body mass index 94.2), Jodi at 5'6" and 363 pounds (body mass index 58.6). After six months, Tom is down to 476 pounds (a loss of 162) and has had surgery to remove a large lymphedema growth from his leg, while Jodi is down to 286 pounds (a loss of 77).
2	"Rickywayne McCartney/Jessica Murphy"	January 24, 2011
Rickywayne, from Mont Belvieu, Texas is 35 years old when he begins his weight-loss journey at 555 pounds. Jessica, from Livingston, Texas, is 28 years old with a starting weight of 289 pounds. Both struggle with their exercise regime at first, and Rickywayne returns to the fitness resort for a time because a producer of the show gets in a fight with a family member over the lies that they told his family. They threaten Rickywayne that if he doesn't go back to the resort they will kick him off the show, as well as Jessica. Rickywayne had no choice but to go back and let them spin the lies that he wasn't doing well but in reality was losing 10+ lbs. a week while at home. Jessica has surgery to remove excess skin after losing 50 pounds. At the end of the six months, Jessica has reduced to 217 (a loss of 72 pounds) and Rickywayne to 427 pounds (a loss of 128 pounds).
3	"Sharon Bowman/Ashley Greely"	January 31, 2011
Sharon, age 47, from Cedar Park, Texas comes to the weight-loss program at 366 pounds, grieving from the deaths of her mother and her son. Ashley, age 26, from Austin, Texas, weighs 296 pounds, lives with her alcoholic father, and is a binge drinker. In the course of the six months, Ashley moves out on her own, quits her bartending job, and reduces her weight to 205 pounds (a loss of 91 pounds). Sharon reduces her weight to 255 pounds (a loss of 110 pounds) during this time. Sharon states at the conclusion of the six months that she plans to lose an additional 100 pounds, and Ashley states she plans to lose another 50.
4	"Travis/Lindy Cockburn"	February 7, 2011
Travis, age 34 from Round Rock, Texas, has been overweight since childhood and begins the weight-loss program at 433 pounds. Lindy, age 37 from Dallas, Texas, begins at 285 pounds, 175 of which was gained following her divorce. During the six months, both face several challenges: Travis's wife gives birth to their second son, and the family moves to a new home, while Lindy remarries and has surgery to remove excess skin. Travis's trainer, Glen Langford (owner of Anytime Fitness at 34th & Guadalupe in Austin TX) confronts Travis for cheating with pasta, causing more tears in this episode. At the conclusion of the program, Travis has reduced to 334 pounds (a loss of 99 pounds) and Lindy to 220 pounds (a loss of 65 pounds).
5	"Kevin Jackson/Flor Gonzalez"	February 14, 2011
Kevin, the Austin Middle School teacher and football coach from Beaumont, Texas struggles with his weight loss because he rationalizes that he cannot quit his high-fat diet "cold turkey" and must ease himself off of his normal foods. Flor, a full-time employee as well as a part-time college student from San Antonio, Texas, wants to achieve a healthy weight in order to safely have a child with her second husband. Both Kevin and Flor struggle with having family members who are initially less than completely supportive of the changes needed to ensure healthy changes in their respective diets.
6	"Ronnie Hicks/Debbie Daniels"	February 21, 2011
Ronnie is 446 lbs. and he lives in Dallas, Georgia. He is getting married; unfortunately, his weight is keeping them from their perfect beach wedding. And Debbie is 401 lbs plus she lives in Wilmington, North Carolina. She never has had a date, or a full time job, and is still financially dependent on her parents. After six months, Ronnie lost 172.8 lbs and Debbie lost 130.6 lbs. Both gained confidence and had kept the weight off after three months.
7	"Johnny Lindstrom/Jill Adams"	February 28, 2011
Jill, a 34-year-old teacher from Gainesville, Georgia, wants to have children but has been unable to conceive; her doctor has told her she must lose 100 pounds in order to get pregnant. She weighs in at 305 pounds. Johnny, a 19-year-old from Tempe, Arizona attending college in Arizona, struggles with issues of abandonment by his biological mother. He weighs in at 404 pounds. During the six-month program, Jill is caught hiding food, and Johnny reunites with his birth family. At the final weigh-in, Jill reaches 209 pounds, for a total loss of 96 pounds. Jill subsequently loses the remaining ten pounds her doctor requires for her to resume trying to conceive. Johnny reaches a weight of 266 pounds, for a total loss of 138 pounds.
8	"Bill Searcey/Julia Hightower"	March 7, 2011
Bill, a 52-year-old former football player from Birmingham, Alabama, is recovering from addiction to narcotics. He weighs in at 443 pounds, and has dangerously high blood pressure. Julia, a 25-year-old from Atlanta, Georgia who is about to start law school, gained weight while grieving her mother's death, and is saddened that her boyfriend left her because of her weight gain. She weighs in at 254.4 pounds, and has elevated blood glucose which puts her at high risk for diabetes. During the six-month program, Bill suffers knee pain and fights becoming re-addicted to narcotic painkillers, while Julia learns to express grief she has repressed. At the final weigh-in, Bill reaches 301.6 pounds for a total loss of 141.4 pounds, while Julia reaches 166 pounds for a total loss of 88.4 pounds. Julia celebrates by taking a four-day bicycle ride back to Atlanta, while Bill attends his son's football game for the first time in years.
9	"Tim Randles/Stacia Kingston"	March 14, 2011
Tim is a 32-year-old from Canton, Ohio with achondroplastic dwarfism, measuring 4 feet 2 inches tall but weighing in at 240.2 pounds, for a body mass index of 68. He suffers from sleep apnea and mild narcolepsy. His troubles with weight gain began after his mother was killed in a car accident when he was a teenager. Stacia is a 36-year-old from Atlanta, Georgia, weighing in at 435.2 pounds and also suffering from sleep apnea. She sleeps in a chair and needs to use a CPAP machine to keep her airway open. Both Tim and Stacia have elevated blood glucose levels, putting them at high risk for diabetes. Stacia endured sexual abuse at the hands of a family member from ages 6-12, and now worries that her marriage is on shaky ground. Over the course of the six months, Stacia adapts well to the exercise, while Tim struggles more, partly owing to his shorter limbs. At the conclusion of the live-in program, Tim reaches 173.4 pounds for a loss of 66.8 pounds, while Stacia reaches 286.4 pounds for a loss of 148.8 pounds. Two months following the program, Tim has maintained his weight loss and found a job. Stacia loses another 15 pounds, leaves her marriage, and rediscovers her joy of performing on stage.
10	"Mark Evans/Patty West"	March 21, 2011
Mark is a 39-year-old from Athens, Georgia, who is expecting his first child, and wants to get in shape to run a half-marathon. He began gaining weight while in the Army and received a medical discharge because of his size. He weighs in at 517 pounds, with a body mass index of 70, high blood pressure, and high risk for diabetes. Patty is a 59-year-old from Mesa, Arizona, who began gaining weight, along with other members of her family, when one of her sons died at the age of 23. She needs a mobility scooter to get around, and has difficulty playing with her grandchildren. She weighs in at 312.8 pounds, with a body mass index of 65. During the six-month program, Mark's daughter is born, and he misses his family greatly after a 12-day stay with them. Patty reunites with her oldest son after a ten-year separation. At the final weigh-in, Mark reaches 357.4 pounds for a total weight loss of 159.6 pounds, and successfully completes the Athens half-marathon. He loses an additional 30 pounds and finishes another half-marathon in the following months. Patty reaches 247 pounds for a total loss of 65.8 pounds. She struggles to maintain her weight loss, but can now play more with her grandchildren, and walk with a cane rather than having to use the scooter.
11	"Sallie Harrison/Chad Curtiss"	March 28, 2011
Sallie is a 29-year-old from Foley, Alabama, who has always been overweight. Her father committed suicide when she was 24. Her eight-year-old son is also overweight at 150 pounds. She weighs in at 443.4 pounds, and suffers from high blood pressure. Chad is a 27-year-old from Decatur, Georgia, who fears he will die prematurely if he doesn't lose weight; his girlfriend shares his fears. His father was abusive and left Chad and his mother when he was very young. He weighs in at 509 pounds, with a body mass index of 71. During the six-month program, both participants have visits from their families, and Chad begins to reconnect with his father over the telephone. Both successfully complete a triathlon, consisting of a 500 meter swim, six mile bike ride, and five kilometer run, during their stay. At the conclusion of the program, Sallie reaches 306.8 pounds for a total loss of 136.6 pounds. She loses an additional 40 pounds in the following four months, while her son loses ten. Chad reaches 368.4 pounds at his final weigh-in, for a total loss of 140.6 pounds. He then proposes to his girlfriend, who accepts. In the following four months he loses an additional 22.4 pounds, and later gets married.
12	"Where Are They Now? (Texas)"	April 4, 2011
This episode checked into a few of the Texas participants. The trainers for the Texas participants were David & Britny.
