= Talpa TV =

Dutch commercial broadcasting company

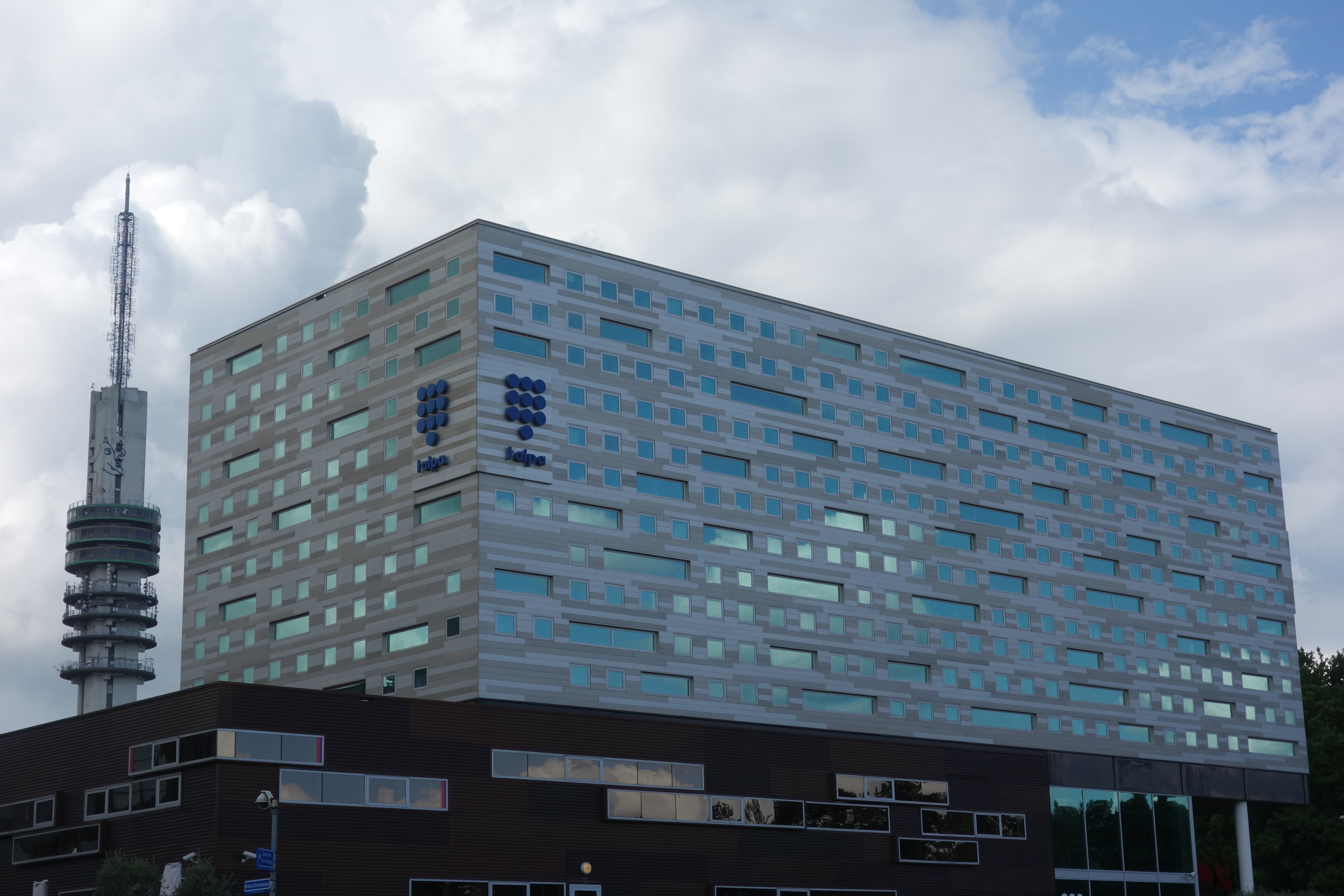
- Type: Broadcast television network
- Country: Netherlands
- Availability: National
- Founded: 28 August 1995; 31 years ago
- TV stations: SBS6, Net5, Veronica, SBS9, and KIJK
- Headquarters: Rietlandpark 333, 1019 DW, Amsterdam, Netherlands
- Owner: Talpa Holding
- Parent: Talpa Network
- Key people: Fons van Westerloo; Founder of SBS Broadcasting B.V. John de Mol Jr. Founder of Talpa TV & owner
- Former names: SBS Broadcasting B.V. (1995-2017)
- Language: Dutch

Talpa TV (formerly SBS Broadcasting B.V.) is a Dutch commercial broadcasting company owned by John de Mol's Talpa Network.

== History ==
The network was launched by SBS Broadcasting in 1995 with the introduction of SBS6, the third commercial channel of The Netherlands after RTL 4 and RTL 5. A second channel was added on 1 March 1999 with the launch of NET5, through which channel the network wanted to challenge the Dutch public broadcasting system. In 2001 the group bought Fox from News Corporation and renamed it V8. The channel was shared with Fox Kids during the daytime. They initially bought the channel for Veronica, because Veronica left the Holland Media Groep and were looking for a new network. Veronica considered various options, such as returning to the public broadcasting system, but reached an agreement with Viacom to broadcast in the evening on TMF. This arrangement didn't work out and the trust behind Veronica made a deal with SBS Broadcasting. In the deal V8 would be transformed to Veronica and their publishing house would transfer to SBS Broadcasting, in exchange for a 10% share in the Dutch branch of SBS Broadcasting and a licensing fee for their name.

In 2005 SBS Broadcasting SA, the international company to which SBS Broadcasting B.V. partially belonged, was acquired by investors Permira and KKR for €2,1 billion. That same year the new owners struck a deal with Telegraaf Media Group (27%) and Vereniging Veronica (10%) the other owners of the Dutch branch, in which both would sell their share. The entire global network of SBS Broadcasting was acquired in 2007 by ProSiebenSat. 1 for €3,3 billion. The Dutch branch was taken over in 2011 by the Finish publisher Sanoma and John de Mol’s Talpa Holding, holding a 67% and 33% stake respectively. The Netherlands Authority for Consumers and Markets agreed to the acquisition on the condition that John de Mol would sell his 26% stake in RTL Nederland, which he acquired when he sold them his channel Tien. With the new owners SBS Broadcasting launched a video on demand service called KIJK in 2013 and a fourth channel called SBS9 in 2015.

Sanoma left the enterprise in 2017, when they sold their 67% share for €237 million to John de Mol’s Talpa Holding. Sanoma would completely acquire the Veronica Publishing house in this deal. With the acquisition John de Mol wanted to create a strong Dutch media empire with his other assets. This resulted in the creation of Talpa Network in 2017 and the renaming of SBS Broadcasting B.V. to Talpa TV, the channels were placed as a vertical in the Talpa Network empire.

=== Proposed merger with RTL Nederland ===
After the complete acquisition of SBS Broadcasting in 2017, John de Mol sought a partnership with RTL Nederland. In his opinion there wasn’t enough space in the Dutch market for two major networks, RTL shut down his offer. However in June 2021 RTL Nederland and Talpa Network announced plans for a merger, pending approval by the European Commission and the Netherlands Authority for Consumers and Markets. In the new conglomerate, RTL Nederland is to hold 70% of the shares and Talpa Holding 30%. Talpa Entertainment Productions and Talpa Concepts won't be a part of the merger. Both parties reasoned that a merger was the only solution to an ever growing presence of foreign media parties, giving space to a single commercial Dutch media company that's capable of producing specifically for the Dutch market. Critics however claimed that the failing of Talpa Network is the reason behind the merger. In January 2022 the Netherlands Authority for Consumers and Markets stated that it could not approve the merger as of yet and that further investigation to the consequences of price, quality and innovation is necessary.

== Assets ==
=== Television channels ===
- SBS6, flagship channel of the group with a market share of 8,5% in 2020.
- Net5, channel focused on high-educated female viewers with a market share of 3,6% in 2020.
- Veronica, channel focused on sports and male viewers with a market share of 3,4 in 2020. The channel is shared with Disney Jr. during the daytime. (formerly Disney XD)
- SBS9, channel focused on films and series already previously broadcast on the other three networks with a market share of 0,9% in 2020.

=== VOD ===
- KIJK

== Gallery ==
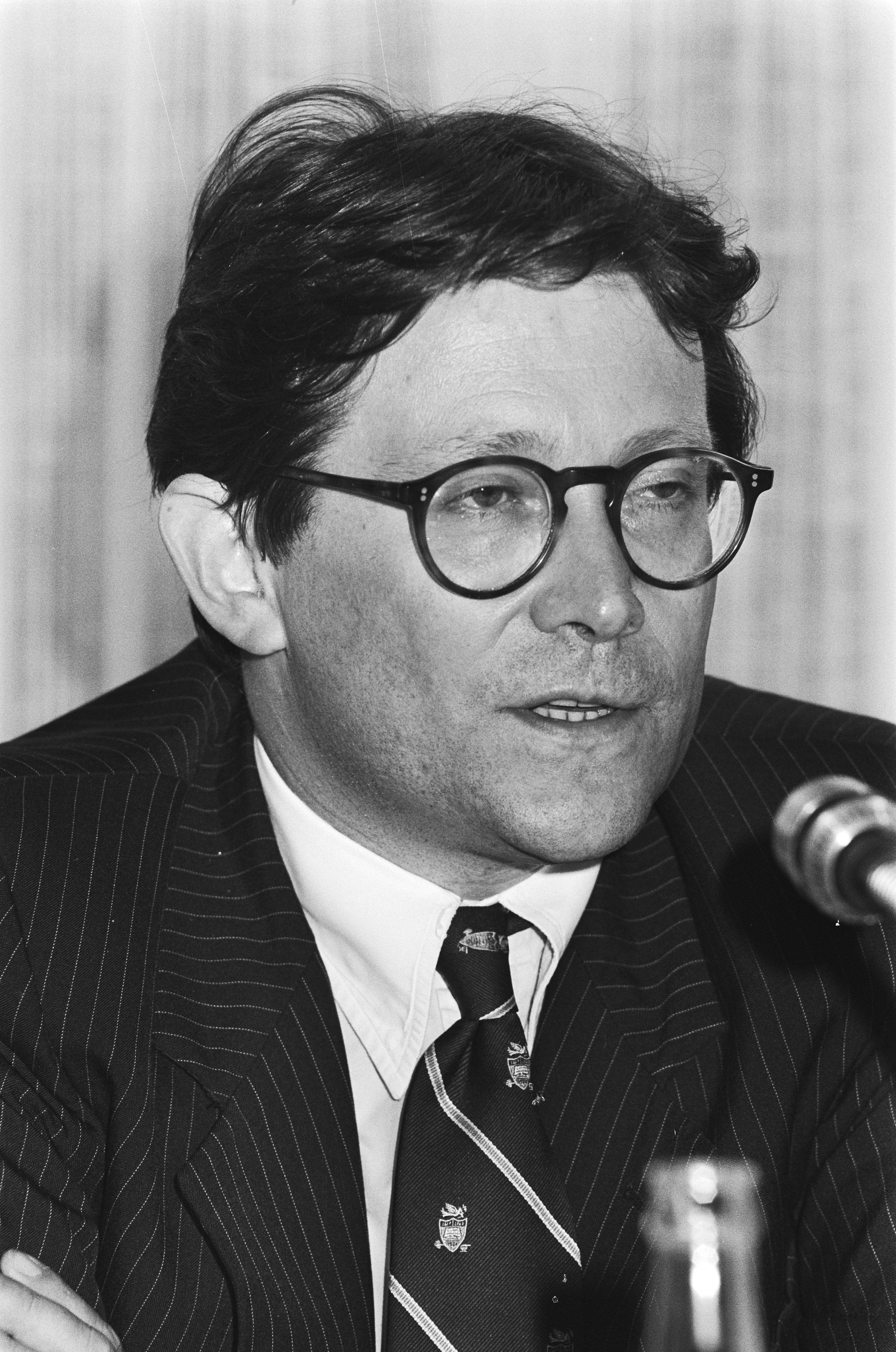
Fons van Westerloo
Founder SBS Broadcasting B.V.

SBS6

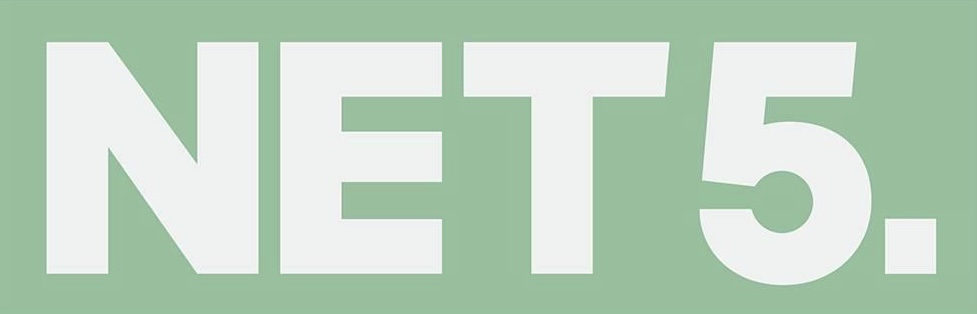
NET5

Veronica

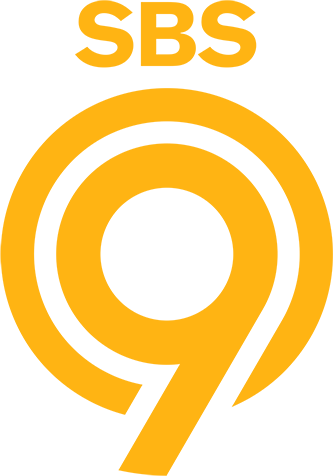
SBS9

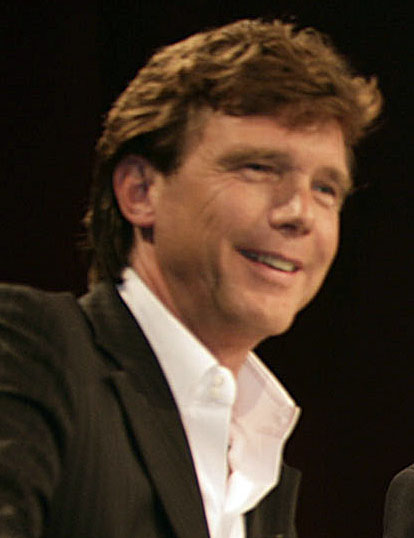
John de Mol Jr.
Owner and founder Talpa TV
