= SBS6 =

Commercial TV channel in the Netherlands

- Country: Netherlands
- Broadcast area: Netherlands
- Headquarters: Amsterdam, Netherlands

Programming
- Picture format: 1080p50 HDTV (downscaled to 16:9 576i for the SDTV feed)

Ownership
- Owner: Talpa Network
- Parent: Talpa TV
- Sister channels: Net5; Veronica; SBS9

History
- Launched: 28 August 1995; 31 years ago

Links
- Website: www.sbs6.nl

Availability

Terrestrial
- Digitenne: Channel 6 (HD)

Streaming media
- Ziggo GO: ZiggoGO.tv (Europe only)
- KPN iTV Online: Watch live (Europe only)

SBS6 is a Dutch free-to-cable commercial TV channel and is a part of Talpa TV, formerly known as SBS Broadcasting B.V. and now owned by Talpa Network. Other channels of the group in the Netherlands are Net5, Veronica, and SBS9. It is the second private television network in the Netherlands and third general network overall in terms of founding, after the two RTL channels.

== History ==
SBS stands for Scandinavian Broadcasting System. When the SBS Broadcasting Group started expanding outside of Scandinavia in 1995, one of the first countries where they set up a channel was the Netherlands with SBS6. They applied for a cable license in March of that year in an attempt to beat the launch of Veronica in September. Launch rumours included the defection of RTL 5's director of programming Fons van Westerloo to head the new channel from 1 May. SBS6 was the third Dutch commercial TV station after RTL 4 and RTL 5, which were launched in 1989 and 1993 respectively. The channel was set to counter the two RTL channels by having a strong localist flair (50% of its programming), while 40% of its imports were American. SBS6 launched on 28 August 1995.

When SBS6 was launched, they were in a tough competition with the channel Veronica, which started as a commercial station at the same time. Both SBS6 and Veronica wanted to be on channel 6 of the viewer's television. The channel was initially nicknamed as a "people's channel" or a "camping channel", but over time had become a broader channel, achieving the third place in the Dutch television market, behind NPO 1 and RTL 4, with a market share of 10%.

The SBS Broadcasting Group expanded their Dutch channel lineup with Net5 on 1 March 1999. In 2003, Veronica was added to the lineup.

The ProSiebenSat.1 Media took over the parent company, SBS Broadcasting Group, on 27 June 2007. In 2011, all of SBS's activities in the Netherlands (through SBS Broadcasting B.V.), including the three TV stations (SBS6, Net5, and Veronica), the two TV guides (Veronica Magazine and Totaal TV), production, design, and teletext activities were sold to a joint venture between Sanoma Media Netherlands (67%) and Talpa Holding (33%).

On 10 April 2017, Talpa Holding acquired a 67% stake from Sanoma Media Netherlands.

After possible merger negotiations with RTL Nederland failed, several Talpa personalities moved from RTL 4 to SBS6 from early 2019, such as It Takes 2, Dance Dance Dance and Miljoenenjacht. Likewise, it brought several personalities of a certain weight to attract viewers, such as Patty Brard, Wendy van Dijk, Winston Gerschtanowitz, Gordon, Johnny de Mol, Linda de Mol and Jan Versteegh.

== Programming ==
=== Imported ===
- According to Jim
- Band of Brothers
- Castle
- Close to Home
- Columbo
- Coronation Street
- Days of Our Lives
- Diagnosis: Murder
- Elementary
- Escape to the Country
- Flashpoint
- The Fresh Prince of Bel-Air
- Friends
- Heartbeat
- House
- Little House on the Prairie
- Martin
- Medical Emergency
- The Mentalist
- Monk
- Murder, She Wrote
- My Wife and Kids
- NCIS
- NCIS: Los Angeles
- Rome
- The Sing-Off
- Space: Above and Beyond
- Under the Dome
- Who's the Boss?

=== Local ===
- Achmea Kennisquiz
- Alle hens aan dek
- Alles over wonen
- Andy & Melisa
- Als de brandweer
- Arbeidsmarkt TV
- BankGiro Loterij The Wall
- Battle of the Bands
- Bouw Je Droom
- Celblok H (an adaptation of the Australian drama Wentworth)
- De Bondgenoten
- Domino Day
- Groeten uit de Rimboe (2005-2010)
- Hart van Nederland
- Lang Leve de Liefde
- Moordfeest
- My Tribute to Elvis
- Postcodeloterij Miljoenenjacht
- Reportage
- Shownieuws
- Actienieuws
- Trauma Centrum
- Vandaag Inside

=== Sports ===
- BDO World Darts Championship
- Marathon Speedskating
- PDC World Darts Championship – Summaries only (live on the website)
- Red Bull Air Race
- UEFA Champions League, since the 2015/16 season
- FIFA World Cup qualification and UEFA European Championship qualifying matches of the Netherlands national football team (all home and friendly matches)

=== SBS6 Classics ===
SBS6 Classics is a FAST channel created on 15 July 2022, which airs reruns of past SBS6 productions. It initially launched on Samsung TV Plus and expanded to the NLZiet platform in 2023.
