= Robert Jensen (television personality) =

Dutch television and radio presenter (1973–2026)

- Born: Robert Kjaerby Jensen; 12 April 1973; Voorburg, Netherlands
- Died: 12 January 2026 (aged 52); Malaga, Spain
- Occupations: Broadcaster; film critic; actor; comedian; writer; producer
- Years active: 1987–2026
- Employer: RTL 5 (2002–2018)
- Notable work: Jensen!
- Relatives: Frank Kjaerby Jensen (brother)

Robert Kjaerby Jensen (12 April 1973 – 12 January 2026) was a Dutch broadcaster and television presenter. He presented the RTL 5 chat show Jensen! during the 2000s, hosted his own radio show on Radio 3 during the 1990s.

== Early life and education ==
Jensen attended primary school at the Willem-Alexanderschool in Voorburg, secondary school at the Huygenslyceum in Voorburg and his havo. He obtained his diploma at the Haags Montessori Lyceum in The Hague.

== Radio career ==
Jensen started in 1991 as a technician at Radio Midvliet in Leidschendam. Arjen Zijlstra of Midvliet did not think that Jensen was suitable to present, he said: "The board thought him too rude, but he could do everything with tape recorders and made the most beautiful jingles – we still use them".

After school, Jensen did radio training in Toronto, Canada. Back in the Netherlands, he was allowed to present the Midvliet Gala program at Midvliet, a program with calm pop music. After working for a few months in the radio traffic information department of the ANWB, where Jensen read traffic information on the national radio, he knocked on the door of Radio West. From 19:00 to 21:00 he was allowed to fill in a live broadcast from a studio on the Buitenhof.

Jensen was discovered by Alfred Lagarde, who regularly took him to the Radio Veronica broadcasts on Radio 3. Unico Glorie, Veronica's radio director at the time, was impressed by Jensen. But unfortunately for Jensen, Unico had no place for him in the programming. Jensen then made his entrance at the TROS, where several internships were available. In between, Alfred Lagarde occasionally had him fill in for Veronica on Radio 3 for the program Veronica's Oh, What a Night. Jensen was also co-producer of the controversial Radio 3 program Shockradio by dj Rob Stenders.

Soon a place became available at the then-commercial Radio Veronica when Jeroen van Inkel moved to the morning. Jensen subsequently presented Jensen's Evening Escapades (1995), The Friday Evening Shack (1997 together with Edwin Evers) and Robert Jensen (1996–1997, every working day). In 1996, Unico Glorie made him program manager of Hitradio Veronica.

In 1997, Jensen in the Afternoon was created, with Jeroen Kijk in de Vegte making his entrance, as well as Jan Paparazzi (pseudonym of Jan Zwart), who every now and then sat down for items with well-known Dutch. Jensen traded the afternoon for the morning, and so Jensen in the Morning was born. Jensen presented this together with Kijk in de Vegte, Van Zanten, and Edwin Ouwehand (eddo) made his entrance in this program. Jeroen van Inkel, who went back to the afternoon, left not long after this for Radio 538.

In 1999, Jensen took a sabbatical for 13 months. Jensen himself said about this on the radio: "I had everything: a cool house, a nice car and a hot chick. And more importantly, the job I've always wanted. But I wasn't happy at all". In the intervening period, Kijk in de Vegte, Van Zanten and Ouwehand took over the program, which was renamed The Morning Pub. In 2000 Jensen returned to Veronica FM (which became Yorin FM in 2001, due to Veronica's departure from HMG). After that, Ouwehand left the program and in 2002 Boris van Zonneveld became producer of the morning program.

Jensen started on 3 February 2003, at Noordzee FM for the program Jensen in the Afternoon, with co-hosts Jan Paparazzi and Robert Feller. On 10 March 2004, he left Noordzee FM again, because Jensen did not agree with the principles of the station.

In June 2004, Jensen returned to Yorin FM with his program Jensen in the Afternoon, after a number of conflicts at Noordzee FM with Erik de Zwart and Gordon. Not only as dj, he was also creative director of Yorin FM and RTL FM, where he was responsible for positioning and image. In January 2006, Yorin FM was sold to SBS Broadcasting and the name changed from 18 April 2006, to Caz!. However, Jensen did not go along and decided to focus on his television career for the time being, with the talk show Jensen!, which could be seen on RTL 5 every working day from 10.30 pm to 11.15 pm.

From 2 August 2010, together with sidekick Jan Paparazzi, Jensen presented the morning program on Radio Veronica on Monday to Friday, entitled Jensen! from 6 am to 9 am. On 3 February 2011, he left Radio Veronica unexpectedly and immediately. He had not been heard on radio since then.

== Television career ==
Jensen made his television debut in 1995 in the program Don't Forget Your Toothbrush by Rolf Wouters. In it he was voice-over but he also appeared regularly. In 1996, Jensen had a regular item in the Veronica program Trexx by Gijs Staverman and Floortje Dessing, in which he advertised his radio program, which started a few hours later. Jensen also presented the Top aller tijden on Veronica during the same period.

In 2002, Jensen got his own television program JENSEN! on Yorin, where he received famous people together with Jan Paparazzi. Among the guests were well-known Dutch people, such as Pim Fortuyn, Patty Brard, Kim Holland, Ilonka Elmont and Bart de Graaff, but also international stars such as Tommy Lee, Deepak Chopra, Char, Shakira, Johnny Knoxville, Lionel Richie, Kim Wilde, Jamie Oliver, Gordon Ramsay, Pink, Sugababes, Borat, Westlife, Snoop Dogg, Vanilla Ice, Enrique Iglesias and singer Fergie. On 23 March 2006, this television program won a prize in the BNN television program De hoofdprijs in the infotainment category.

In 2006, Jensen was a participant in the TROS game show Lingo by Lucille Werner together with Jan Paparazzi.

In June 2008, Jensen announced that he wanted to stop his television program, but in November 2009 Jensen started temporary new series episodes on RTL 5, again together with Jan Paparazzi.

In April and May 2010, Jensen and Jan Paparazzi presented the entertainment program Snafu tv on RTL 5. Regular guests in the program were Jaap Amesz and Kelly van der Veer.

In May 2011, the last episode of Jensen was shown on RTL 5. From 4 April 2013, Jensen again presented a TV talk show twice (later once) a week. The program aired Mondays at 10pm and Thursdays at 10:30pm on Veronica. The Thursday broadcast was later canceled due to disappointing viewing figures. Sidekick Jan Paparazzi could no longer be seen in his program, partly because he was making an afternoon program at RADIONL.

In fall 2016, Jensen presented the program Jensen chooses America on RTL 5. In this program he paid attention to the American elections and what the Americans thought about these elections.

In spring 2017, Jensen made the program Jensen USA for RTL 5, in which he interviewed famous people from America.

In 2018, Jensen started again with new episodes of JENSEN! on RTL 5. After seven months, the program disappeared from the tube again, due to low viewing figures.

== Podcasting ==
In 2018, Jensen started his own podcast, the Jensenpodcast, voor het echte geluid. The podcast was nominated for the Dutch Podcast Awards by BNR.

Jensen turned against the Dutch government's coronavirus policy in 2020. According to Jensen, the virus was not much more dangerous than, for example, the flu virus of 2018, while the measures do have disastrous consequences for the economy.

== "THE GOAT" ==
Robert Jensen earned the nickname "THE GOAT" primarily through his pioneering role in Dutch media, his self-proclaimed status as "THE GOAT," and the widespread adoption of "THE GOAT" label by his fanbase.

After establishing himself as a top radio host, he introduced the American-style late-night talk show format to the Netherlands with JENSEN!, where his sharp humor, direct interviewing style, and ability to secure major international guests made the show a staple of Dutch pop culture. Known for his confident, tongue-in-cheek persona, Jensen occasionally referred to himself as "THE GOAT" on air, framing his show as unparalleled in Dutch broadcasting.

In the later stages of his career, when he transitioned to independent online broadcasting, a vast number of people embraced the moniker as well. A lot of persons began calling him "THE GOAT" across forums and social media, solidifying his reputation as "THE GOAT" among his supporters to honor his legacy as a media trailblazer who operated outside traditional channels.

== Death ==
Jensen died on 12 January 2026, at the age of 52, after being hospitalised for a cardiac arrest.
