= Llink =

Dutch broadcasting association

- Type: Public broadcasting association
- Branding: Practical idealist; Environmentalist
- Country: Netherlands
- First air date: 4 September 2005
- Founded: 2004; 22 years ago
- Dissolved: 1 September 2010
- Official website: www.llink.nl
- Replaced: DeNieuwe Omroep; Omroep Nútopia

Llink (stylised as LLiNK) was a public broadcaster within the Dutch public broadcasting system. Founded in 2004, it positioned itself as a practical idealist broadcaster with the objective to produce "positive, solution-oriented programmes about world affairs, human and animal rights, nature and the environment". After a period of financial difficulty, it was removed from the public broadcasting system and shut down in 2010.

== History ==
DeNieuwe Omroep, a broadcasting association attempting to enter the Dutch public broadcasting system since 2000, merged in 2004 with fellow aspiring broadcaster Nútopia to form DeNieuwe Omroep Nútopia. That same year, the organisation applied for admission to the public broadcasting system. Although the Dutch Media Authority issued a positive recommendation and the Council for Culture a negative one, State Secretary Medy van der Laan ultimately approved its entry. On 21 June 2005, the broadcaster adopted the name Llink, and in September, it launched with two hours of television and nine hours of radio per week.

In 2007, Llink recruited presenter Floortje Dessing, formerly of Veronica and RTL 5, on a yearly salary of €190,000. She was positioned as the broadcaster's new public face and was given "the opportunity to combine her passion for travel with her personal ideals of contributing positively to a clean, safe and free world for humans and animals".

On 19 February 2009, Llink applied for a suspension of payments to avoid bankruptcy – the first public broadcaster to do so. The Media Authority instructed Netherlands Public Broadcasting (NPO) to halt funding until the financial situation became clearer. A deficit of €1 million on an €8 million budget soon emerged. The broadcaster's financial problems were attributed in part to Dessing's salary and the high production costs of the travel programme 3 op Reis. As a cost-cutting measure, the programme was cancelled on 19 March, and presenters Froukje Jansen and Floortje Dessing left the organisation.

On 4 November 2009, it was announced that Llink would lose its airtime after September 2010, having failed to demonstrate its added value to the public broadcasting system. Llink contested the decision, calling it "improperly reached" and politically motivated, but its objections were unsuccessful. The broadcaster went off the air permanently on 1 September 2010.

An auction of office and studio equipment followed on 1 October 2010, raising around €80,000. The broadcaster hoped to use the proceeds for a potential relaunch as a "green" production house, while legal challenges to the shutdown were still ongoing. On 29 April 2011, however, the Amsterdam court ruled that Llink would not return to the public broadcasting system.

== Founders ==
=== DeNieuwe Omroep ===
Media professionals founded DeNieuwe Omroep (lit. 'The New Broadcaster') in 2000 to make programmes on human rights, the environment and world affairs:

- Aad van den Heuvel
- Walter Etty
- Thijs Chanowski

=== Omroep Nútopia ===
Nútopia was founded in November 2003. Its founders included individuals with political ties to the Socialist Party and the Party for the Animals:

- Niko Koffeman
- Marianne Thieme
- Krista van Velzen

== Presenters ==
Former presenters of Llink include:

- Edo Brunner
- Floortje Dessing
- Marc de Hond
- Froukje Jansen
- Teun van de Keuken
- Barbara Kathmann
