= Supreme Team =

Supreme Team may refer to:

- Supreme Team (gang)
- Supreme Team (band)
- The Supreme Team, the alias for the union of four hardcore artists: Outblast, Angerfist, Tha Playah and Evil Activities
