= Celebrity culture =

High-volume exposure to celebrities' personal lives

Celebrity culture is a high-volume exposure to celebrities' personal lives on a global scale. It is inherently tied to consumer interests where celebrities transform their fame to become product brands.

Whereas a culture can usually be physically identified, and its group characteristics easily observed, celebrity culture exists solely as a collection of individuals' desires for increased celebrity viewing. Celebrities themselves do not form a cohesive and identifiable group with which they identify themselves, but are rather found across a spectrum of activities and communities including acting, politics, fashion, sports and music. This "culture" is created when there is common knowledge within a society that people are interested in celebrities and are willing to alter their own lives to take part in celebrities' lives. The "culture" is first defined by factors outside of celebrities themselves and then augmented by celebrities' involvement within that publicly constructed culture. Celebrity culture has become a part of everyday society and functions as a form of entertainment. Today, everyday citizens play an important role in the perpetuation of celebrity culture by constantly checking the whereabouts of celebrities, their friends, the trends within celebrity culture, and the general lives of celebrity via media. Celebrity culture is now reflected in social norms and values because of the extreme citizen involvement. Today, as it is now used as entertainment, celebrity culture is viewed as a form of "escapism" from reality and a means of preoccupation for everyday people.

== History ==
Celebrity culture in the United States began in the late nineteenth century as the nouveaux riches sought personal publicity in the society columns and magazines of the day. While philanthropists, politicians, and other public figures were the best-known New Yorkers in the 1870s, by the 1890s, the new elite were people celebrated for their gossip value. Film historian Richard Schickel cites the beginning of the modern celebrity system to the period between 1895 and 1920. In the 1930s and '40s, the modern culture of celebrity was fashioned through the columns of Walter Winchell, America's "most celebrated gossip writer".

== Promotion from celebrities ==
There have been multiple phases in the popularity of celebrity culture. Some examples include the broadcasting of television programs where human beings could reach wider audiences and individuals could be given rise to fame. As different technologies were released, the manipulation of audiences changed, and the reaches of celebrity culture has greatly expanded. Entrepreneurial individuals began to recognize the financial value in purposefully promoting certain individuals, and thus a consumer approach to celebrities as brands emerged. A culture began to take shape as consumers accepted celebrities as a part of society. This acceptance along with shrewd marketing perpetuates celebrity culture with its constantly shifting customs and beliefs.

Celebrity culture can be viewed as synonymous with celebrity industry, where celebrities are treated as products to be sold. Celebrity culture differs from consumer culture in that celebrity culture is a single aspect of consumer culture. Celebrity culture could not exist without consumer culture, as people are consistently buying magazines, apps for celebrities, and other celebrity-related merchandise. Consumers' choices are thus influenced by celebrities' choices. By following celebrities, consumers are invited to take part in the collective society created by the existence of celebrity culture, unknowingly perpetuated by the consumers themselves. Participants of the celebrity culture phenomenon also include the celebrities themselves, being aware they can brand themselves and achieve financial gains through their own fame and status, apart from the foundation of their celebrity pre-branding.

"To people who have grown tired of self-government, the belief in kings and queens and fairy tales seems easier and more comfortable than the practice of politics," wrote Lewis Lapham in his book, The Wish For Kings. This notion is the basis for the naturally occurring relationship between "regular" men and women, and those on a pedestal.

Often times in ancient history, great leaders, such as the pharaohs of Egypt, set in motion devices to ensure their own fame for centuries to come.

Celebrity culture, once restricted to royalty and biblical/mythical figures, has pervaded many sectors of society including business, publishing, and even academia (the scilebrities). With every scientific advance names have become attached to discoveries. Especially for large contributions to humanity, the contributor is usually regarded honourably. Mass media has increased the exposure and power of celebrity. A trend has developed that celebrity carries with it increasingly more social capital than in earlier times. Each nation or cultural community (linguistic, ethnic, religious) has its own independent celebrity system, but this is becoming less the case due to globalization (see J-pop or K-pop).

== Perpetuation of celebrity culture ==
According to Oliver Dreissens, celebrity's social and cultural prominence can be traced back to the success of the mass media. The various forms of mass media allowed for the spread of new images and branding of celebrities. Especially with the inclusion of televisions in the average home, there became more of a familiarity with the people or celebrities now "in our homes". Media surrounding celebrities has heavily influenced not only celebrity culture but the general social environment in our lives. Celebrities are known to not only influence what we buy but many other things such as body image, career aspirations and politics. Richard Dyer has stated that celebrity culture is bound up with the condition of global capitalism in which "individuals are seen to determine society". Newer technologies, such as cable television and 24/7 coverage, have made today's celebrities manufactured for mass consumption, as opposed to the celebrities of the thirties and the fifties who were more self-made. 24/7 coverage pushed for more programming and people to fill the extra time. With this evolved more shows and celebrities who partook in the additional screen time. Reality television has been a large part of fostering a new celebrity culture that is more interchangeable and recognizable.

Cable television and social media sites such as YouTube, have made "overnight" sensations which have perpetuated today's perception of celebrity culture. Celebrities such as Justin Bieber, who rose to immense fame after being discovered on YouTube, are argued to elicit emotional ties and self-reflexiveness that invoke a seemingly personal connection. This can be seen with some fans, especially female fans, feeling like they have a certain ownership or connection over a celebrity. At the same time, the love-hate relationship that many popular media (e.g. British tabloid newspapers) foster between the public and celebrities, whom they admire, envy and also despise, helps to generate continuing interest in celebrity news, and ironically, to promote the cult of celebrity.

== Celebrity and political culture ==
Celebrities and politics have interacted in mainly one of two ways. The first way is celebrity politicians, which crosses an elected office of government with celebritization. The second way is with political activism, a newly popular method which avoids directly participating in government itself.

=== Celebrity politicians ===
Celebrity politicians can be divided into two categories: celebrities that go to the government and hold an elected office and politicians that become celebrities.

Celebrities that have held a government office are not uncommon. Donald Trump is an example of one. A businessman and real estate dealer who has licensed his name to properties and other brands, Trump gained national fame when he starred in the television show The Apprentice in 2004 and again during the 2012 presidential election by implying that then-presidential candidate Barack Obama was not a natural-born United States citizen. He then successfully ran for the United States presidency in 2016. Ronald Reagan is another example. He was a career actor that appeared in 53 films over two decades. He first became governor of California in 1966 and then became president of the United States in 1980.

Politicians have also become celebrities naturally or by copying celebrity traits. The Democratic group "The Squad" is an example. Consisting of Alexandria Ocasio-Cortez, Ilhan Omar, Ayanna Pressley, and Rashida Talib are four Democrat representatives that formed after the 2018 midterm elections, when Ocasio-Cortez posted a picture of the four seated together on Instagram, playing off of the colloquial term 'squad goals.' They have become well known for their outspoken nature in social media and their clashes against other politicians, such as Donald Trump and Nancy Pelosi.

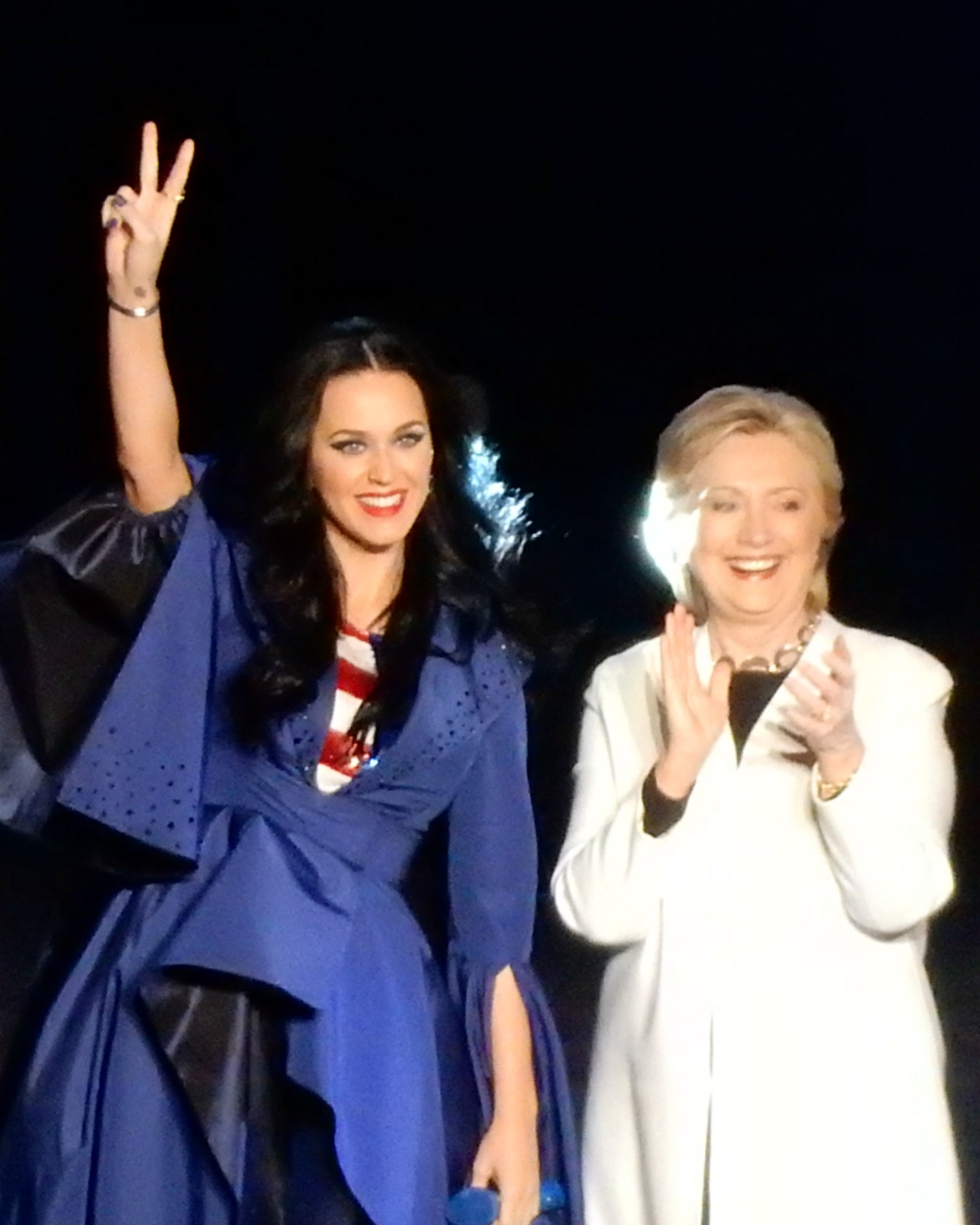
Katy Perry and Hillary Clinton at the I'm With Her concert, which supported Hillary Clinton in the 2016 presidential race

There has recently been an intersection of celebrity and political culture. This is a result of the large platform given to celebrities; as Jane Johnson, a reporter for the popular British celebrity publication Closer observed, the gossip surrounding celebrities is a nationally unifying factor among all social groups. This unification and large platform provided by celebrities has been a point of interest for political leaders and groups to gain further reach within various campaigns. Young adults have had historically lower voter turnout than any other voting age group. Knowing this, politicians and public figures draw from the cultural resources curated by celebrities by mimicking the popular, accessible public persona given off by today's celebrities. As noted by the author Frank Furedi, "Politicians self consciously attempt to either acquire a celebrity image or to associate themselves with individuals who possess this status." This can be seen with Canadian Prime Minister Justin Trudeau who has become somewhat of a celebrity because of the perception of being personable and supporting progressive, liberal policies. Another example of this was Katy Perry campaigning and performing for Hillary Clinton during the 2016 presidential election.

=== Celebrities and political issues ===
Celebrities have used their actions to highlight political issues. Jane Fonda has tried to promote awareness of climate change through being arrested for civil disobedience. With the rise of social media, celebrities have been able to express their opinions on controversial topics to get immediate feedback from their fans. Some celebrities have endorsed political candidates, such as Dave Chappelle endorsing 2020 Democratic presidential candidate Andrew Yang.

Some celebrities chose to refrain from using their status in this way. Michael Jordan allegedly said, "Republicans buy sneakers, too." when turning down a politician looking for an endorsement.

=== Celebrity disillusionment ===
Although celebrity status is widely sought by many people, celebrities are often displeased by their status. Overall, there is a general correlation between success and unhappiness. A study done in 2008 notes that CEOs are depressed at more than double the rate of the public at large, suggesting that this is not a phenomenon exclusive to celebrities. Research suggests that people tend to focus more on objective success (ie: status, wealth, reputation) as benchmarks for success, rather than subjective success (ie: self-worth, relationships, moral introspection), and as a result become disillusioned with the success they do have. However, celebrities in particular face specific circumstances that cause them to be displeased by their success.

Paparazzi is often a problem for celebrities, where celebrities have become increasingly objectified and worshipped by fans (see: Celebrity Worship Syndrome), especially in the digital age through social and mass media. This happens because constant exposure to and coverage of these figures leads people to believe that celebrities are their social intimates, who they want to admire, gossip about, or copy habits from. A 2009 study which anonymously interviewed a number of celebrities revealed it was a common sentiment that excess paparazzi causes a loss of personal life, lack of anonymity, and feeling of constantly being watched. This causes them to compensate by forming separate identities, one an image offered to the public, and one reserved for moments of privacy and intimacy.

Another problem is celebrity marriage. There is research that suggests child celebrities have poor emotional health in adulthood, and often turn to drug abuse. A culture of superficiality in Hollywood, where celebrity status is ranked by an "A-list" or "B-list" hierarchy also contributes to celebrity disillusionment with success. Sometimes people who achieved celebrity status come to regret it, for example Bart Spring in 't Veld, who came to loathe the reality TV celebrity culture which Big Brother, of which he was the first winner in the world, instigated.

=== Celebrity gossip ===
Celebrity gossip has become an integral part of American culture, acting as not only a form of entertainment, but a form of social involvement and social order. Gossip allows people to connect and interact with one another, providing a sense of community within society. Through gossip, people are able to affirm their values and ideas by hearing about celebrity struggle via tabloids and other forms of media. The information given to people to consume and discuss allows for civic engagement on a global scale as there is material to talk about with others that is generally known through gossip.

=== Vehicles ===
In the US, celebrity culture is created and disseminated by television talk shows such as Entertainment Tonight, where actors and music stars promote their latest films and albums, and by many celebrity magazines such as People, Us, and Star.

=== Celebrification ===
In the field of cultural studies, the term celebrification refers to the transformation of a ordinary person or thing into a celebrity. It is the process by which one without celebrityhood obtains celebrityhood. Often, the media plays a key role in celebrification by drawing public attention, which can be positive or negative, but nonetheless contributes to the development of the celebrity persona. Further public engagement often contributes to the sense of familiarity and interest in celebrities.

=== Microcelebrity ===
In the field of media studies, microcelebrity is the state of being well known to a niche group of people. It also refers to a self-representation technique whereby people present themselves as public personas, create strategic affective ties with audience members, and view followers as fans.

The term was first coined by Theresa Senft in her work on Camgirls (2008).

== Social media ==
Celebrity culture is and has been a constantly changing topic that grows as technology does. Different platforms are being utilized by celebrities, such as Instagram, Snapchat, or TikTok, all of which provide a new outlet for them to express their thoughts. Some outlets can host constantly-changing celebrity views and may provide an unmonitored and unfiltered space for opinions to be shared, as well as provding a space for celebrities to re-share ideas and safely shares theirs. Such sites also alow for people to comment, making it engaging for fans and followers alike. Other plaforms may be a popular outlet for celebrities, as they can provide an outlet for images, ranging from personal imagery (such as selfies) to updates on celebrity life. Many of such pictures can also include or mention other people who are famous, boosting their image and reaching different fan bases. Lastly, some platforms can still be popular with celebrities due to their reach in older demographics. Many older generations prefer Facebook, for example, because it is easy to navigate and people can share and write posts that are of importance to them.

=== X (formerly Twitter) ===
X (formerly known as Twitter) allowed a higher frequency of interaction with people, thus increasing intimacy and the perception of culture. Twitter users could now directly interact with celebrities with the expectation of a public response.

=== Instagram ===
Through Instagram's unique format another layer of celebrity culture was added, allowing celebrities to further their intimacy with followers by sharing selected photos and videos with their audience. With each additional platform a celebrity uses to promote themselves, a wider view is created thus enhancing the perception of culture. Instagram also recently changed the layout to try to help celebrities become more noticed. They use an algorithm that determines what pictures are at the top of a person's feed and what pictures are at the bottom and are harder to find. Trends of celebrities found on Instagram have a massive cultural impact as the platform allows for people to see and imitate celebrities via clothing, speech, or humor allowing them to indirectly engage with celebrity culture. Today, Instagram can be used as a platform for marketing as celebrities can be paid huge sums of money for product placement or usage in their posts.

=== YouTube ===
YouTube has also become a large part of the growth of social media. On this site, there are YouTube influencers (also known as YouTubers) that have emerged as a new group of celebrities. YouTubers may post videos about their daily life in vlogs, beauty, playing video games, and many other genres. They have become popular in recent years because viewers see them as more relatable than movie stars or other groups of celebrities. Since they are exposed to very personal videos, fans are able to form a strong bond with these influencers.

== Complaints ==
A common complaint of modern celebrity culture is that the public, instead of seeking virtues or talents in celebrities, seek those who are the most willing to break ethical boundaries, or those who are most aggressive in self-promotion. In other words, infamy has replaced fame. The social role of the town drunk, the court jester, or the sexually indiscreet are not new, but arguably, the glorification of these individuals is. Society selects celebrities that provide the most entertainment and news stories as the most notorious.

=== Explanations ===
One possible explanation of this trend is that an artificial importance has been created in order to promote a product or a service, rather than to record a purely biographical event. As more new products are launched in a world market that is constantly expanding, the need for more celebrities has become an industry in itself.

Another explanation, used by Chuck Palahniuk, is that this exaggeration of modern celebrity culture is created out of a need for drama and spectacle. In the book Haunted, he describes the pattern of creating a celebrity as a god-like figure, and once this image is created, the desire to destroy it and shame the individual in the most extreme ways possible. Tabloid magazines are the prototype example of this theory.

== Posthumous fame ==
Some creators such as poets, artists, musicians, and inventors are little-known and little-appreciated during their lives but are feted as brilliant innovators after their deaths. A desire to achieve this type of posthumous fame may have motivated Alan Abel, Adam Rich, and Pauly Shore to stage their deaths. In some cases, after historians uncover a creator's role in developing some cultural or technical process, the contributions of these little-known individuals become more widely known.

Sometimes a false death mention can cause a person to rethink their legacy. Alfred Nobel founded the Nobel Prizes after an erroneous obituary labeled him a "merchant of death" due to his invention and selling of dynamite.

People who were far more famous after their deaths than during their lifetime (and often were completely or relatively unknown) include painter Bob Ross; Greek philosopher Socrates; scientist Galileo Galilei; Romantic poet John Keats; painter Vincent van Gogh; poet and novelist Edgar Allan Poe; singers Eva Cassidy and Nick Drake; comedian Bill Hicks; writer Emily Dickinson; artist Edith Holden, whose 1906 diary was a best-seller when published posthumously in 1977; writer Franz Kafka; singer Jeff Buckley; diarist Anne Frank; philosopher Søren Kierkegaard; musician Robert Johnson; writer John Kennedy Toole (who posthumously won a Pulitzer Prize for Fiction 12 years after his death); author Stieg Larsson (who died with his Millennium novels unpublished); musician, artist and poet Rozz Williams; and William Webb Ellis, the alleged inventor of Rugby football.

Herostratus, a young Greek man arsoned the Temple of Artemis (one of the Seven Wonders of the Ancient World) in 356 BC to immortalize his name. Although authorities at the time tried to erase him from history and punished people with the death penalty for even merely mentioning his name, he succeeded in achieving lasting fame, as his name is well known today.

== See also ==
- Celebrity
- Superstar
- Popularity
- Fifteen minutes of fame
- Hollywood marriages
- Scientific celebrity
- Starsuckers
