= Frank Dane =

Frank Dane may refer to:

- Frank Dane (actor) (1885–1957), British actor
- Frank Dane (presenter) (fl. 2000s–2020s), Dutch radio DJ and TV presenter
