= Kevin Masters Show starring Tom Rhodes =

Dutch television show

- Tom Rhodes interviewing Ilonka Elmont with Dutch subtitles on the Kevin Masters Show.
- Starring: Tom Rhodes; E-Life
- Country of origin: Netherlands
- Original language: English
- No. of seasons: 3

Production
- Running time: 60 minutes
- Production companies: RTL Nederland; Holland Media House

Original release
- Network: Yorin

The Kevin Masters Show starring Tom Rhodes is an English language Dutch television late night talk show that aired every Monday night at 10 p.m. by the Yorin television station from 2002 to 2004 in the Netherlands.

Kevin Masters Show starring Tom Rhodes was hosted by comedian Tom Rhodes and featured rapper E-Life as the musical sidekick.

== Background ==
Rhodes started performing in the Netherlands at Toomlers once a year, beginning in 1998. The RTL network contacted Rhodes London management after seeing him perform in 2002. The producers wanted an American host to interview Dutch celebrities and interpret Dutch culture. The name "Kevin Masters" was simply a generic American name the producers used to fill in until they assigned an actual host. The audition for a host was held at Toomlers, (Yiddish word for "Traveling Merrimaker") the home theatre of Comedytrain, the first stand-up comedy collective in the Netherlands. The actual show was filmed at Rozen Theater in Amsterdam. He was living in Amsterdam with a girlfriend at the time of auditioning for the show. Tom's audition for the show featured his normal stand-up routine and was selected as the best by producers. In addition to Dutch celebrities, Tom also interviewed American celebrities. The charm of the show was that the American host had no idea who these Dutch celebrities were, which added to the humor Rhodes could play upon with each guest.

As a stand-up transitioning to talk show host, Rhodes had to learn to ignore the audience and speak to the people at home through the camera lens. To help him with this task, the Dutch producers allowed him to tape a cut out of Muhammad Ali's head over Camera One. The cut-out remained for the entire first season. In every episode, Rhodes would experience an aspect of Dutch culture in a five-minute film. He called this his favorite part of the show. Some of these experiences included: spending a day with a Dutch farmer, covering the Prime Minister debates, a tour of the Red Light district and gay night life of Amsterdam, attending fashion and master chef awards. Anything culturally unique in Amsterdam was explained to Rhodes by experts, which Rhodes called "like having a magic passport to the entire country."

There is no censorship on Dutch television, unlike in the United States, so Rhodes and his guests were able to swear, show nudity, and even smoke cannabis. Steve-O from Jackass recreated his famous "nut-staple" trick on the program in 2003.

Having experienced television in both American and the Netherlands, Rhodes says the Netherlands were much more auspicious. "The difference between making TV in the US versus the Netherlands is that in the US when quitting time comes everyone runs for the exits and can't get away from their co-workers fast enough. In the Netherlands it is traditional that at the end of the day people go for a drink or a meal and continue talking about the project that you are working on to make it better," said Rhodes. In an interview about the show, Rhodes stated he wished the show would run for 5–10 years, giving him enough time to learn Dutch.

The show ran for three full seasons. It was a concept created by Amsterdam's Blammo Television and was produced by Holland Media House, now Blue Circle. Rhodes became very popular in the Netherlands and was the equivalent to David Letterman in the Dutch talk show world. When the show came to an end, the network asked Tom to be a presenter on Yorin Travel, now known as RTL Travel.

== Notable Guests & Episodes ==
- Tenacious D
- Eddie Zoëy
- Steve-O
- Chris Zegers
- Ilonka Elmont
- Willem Oltmans
- Sylvie van der Vaart
- Frans Bauer
- Maarten van Rossem
- Chazia Mourali
- Peter Klashorst
- Jennifer de Jong
- Henk Schiffmacher
- Gerard Wessel
- Dwight Frijmersum
