= E-Life =

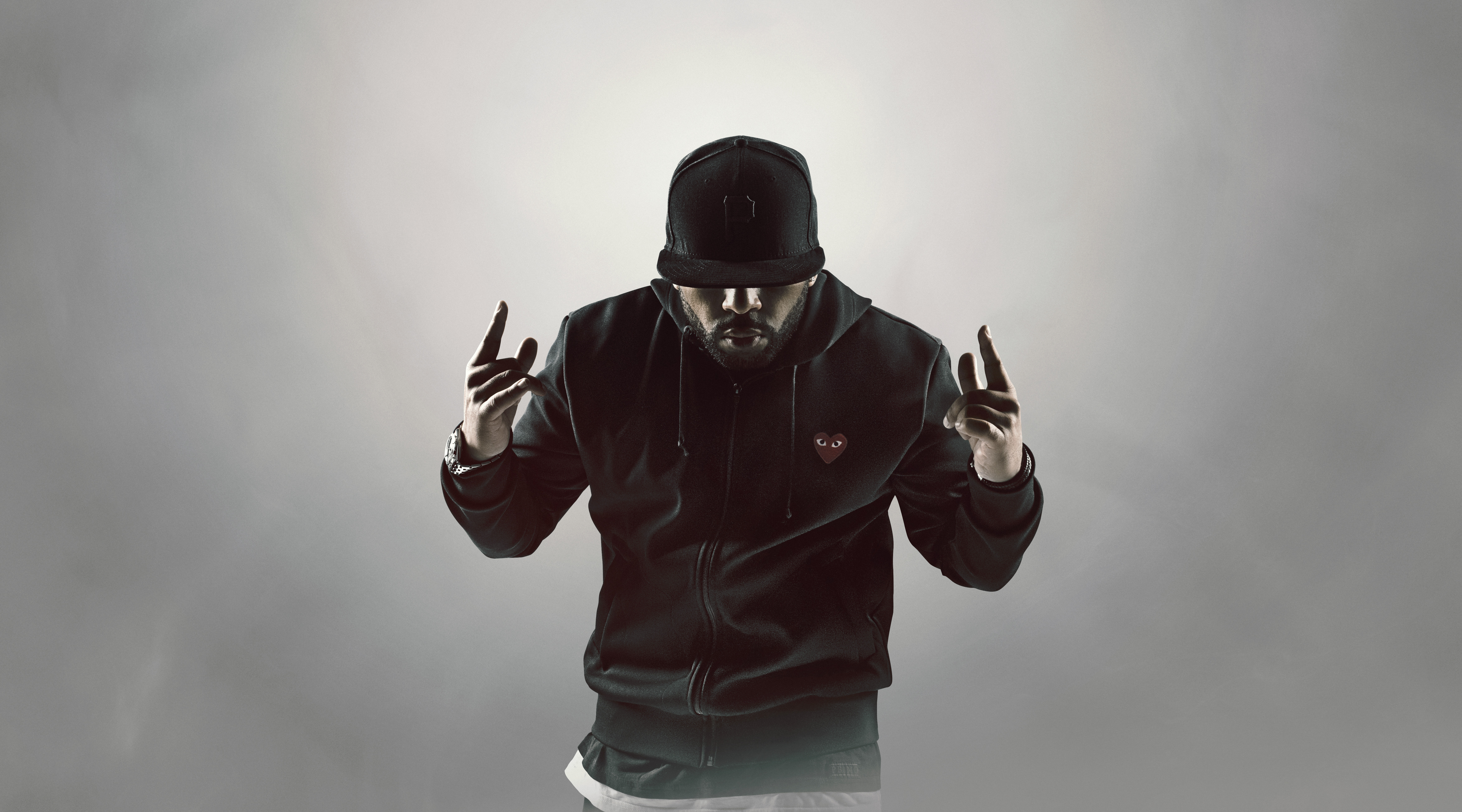
- E-Life

Background information
- Also known as: E-Life
- Born: Elvis de Oliveira
- Origin: Rotterdam, Netherlands
- Genres: Hiphop, Mainstream hardcore
- Occupations: Rapper, radio DJ
- Instrument: Rapping
- Years active: 1993-present
- Label: Edel Music
- Formerly of: Dope Syndicate
- Website: http://www.e-lifemusic.com/

Elvis de Oliveira, better known as E-Life, is a rapper from Rotterdam, Netherlands. He is also a DJ for radio station Juize FM.

E-Life started his music career with rap crew Dope Syndicate. DJ Raw Deal's move to the United States in 1995 prompted E-Life to go solo, touring through Europe. His first solo single, Stacked With Honors, came out a year later, in 1996. The song received a lot of airplay on the radio, but didn't make it to the charts. It was nominated for best hiphop song for the 1997 TMF Awards, and it allowed E-Life to perform with LL Cool J, Snoop Doggy Dogg, Ice Cube, the Wu-Tang Clan, Public Enemy, Blackstreet and Run DMC.

His second single, More Days To Come (1998) was E-Life's biggest hit, reaching sixth place in the Dutch charts. Its successors I Wonder Why and In Doubt '99 (both 1999) didn't make it to the Dutch charts, while K.I.T.A. (Bring It On) would drop from the charts after two weeks.

His second album, E=MC², was distributed throughout Europe. The album features contributions from Michael Franti and Postmen.

From 2002 to 2004, E-Life acted as the musical sidekick to comic Tom Rhodes on the late-night talk show Kevin Masters Show starring Tom Rhodes which aired on the Dutch Yorin television station.

Since 2011, he's been a member of the act Evil Activities.

== Discography ==
Albums

- 1999 - Eleven
- 2002 - E=MC²

Singles

- 1996 - Stacked With Honors
- 1998 - More Days To Come
- 1999 - I Wonder Why
- 1999 - In Doubt '99
- 2002 - K.I.T.A. (Bring It On)
- 2002 - Watch me
- 2011 - Broken (ft. Endymion, Evil Activities)
- 2012 - Hardshock (Official Hardshock Festival 2012 Anthem) (ft. Evil Activities)
- 2012 - World Of Madness (DefQon.1 2012 O.S.T.) (ft. Evil Activities)
- 2014 - Swoosh Fever (ft. Coone & Hard Driver)
- 2015 - Firestarter (ft. Ran-D)
- 2016 - Riot (Coone)
- 2017 - The Incredible (ft. Public Enemies)
- 2017 - Heat It Up (ft. Dirtcaps)
- 2018 - Black Rain (Official Hard Bass Anthem 2018) (ft. Adaro)
- 2019 - Run With the Wolves (ft. Wildstylez)
- 2019 - Supersonic (ft. Audiotricz)
- 2019 - MF DJ (ft. The Prophet)
- 2020 - Different (ft. Audiotricz)
- 2020 - Miami Vice (ft. Frequencerz)
- 2020 - Hold On (ft. D-Sturb & Sogma)
- 2021 - BASE (ft. Sub Zero Project)
