= Viva Vietnam: A White Trash Adventure Tour =

- Opening credits of Viva Vietnam
- Genre: documentary, comedy
- Created by: Tom Rhodes
- Written by: Tom Rhodes, Rich Hall
- Directed by: Jerry Kramer
- Countries of origin: United States and Vietnam
- Original language: English

Production
- Running time: 60 minutes

Original release
- Network: Comedy Central
- Release: April 30, 1995

Viva Vietnam: A White Trash Adventure Tour was a comedy documentary that aired on Comedy Central in 1995 and was hosted by the channel's first spokesperson, comic Tom Rhodes. It was the first opportunity Rhodes had to film and travel internationally for a television station.

== Background and plot ==
In April 1992, a new state constitution was approved in Vietnam, replacing the 1975 Communist version. The central role of the Communist Party was reasserted in all organs of government, politics and society. The country now opened its doors to Western commerce and worldwide tourism. In 1994, Tom Rhodes pitched the idea of filming in Vietnam to Comedy Central, but the network executives were wary. Rhodes promised he would strive not to offend veterans, especially his dad.

Tom Rhodes' father, David B. Rhodes III, was a decorated Vietnam War veteran that flew Huey helicopters in war zones, earning the Purple Heart for his wounds and the Distinguished Flying Cross for his heroics. He returned home from the war with a 50 percent disability after his left leg was ripped open to the bone and his back badly injured in a Huey crash.

Tom recruited friend and comic Rich Hall to accompany him and help with finding humor in the third world surroundings. The special offered Tom an opportunity to break away from his type-casting as an uneducated MTV-generation comic. "Before I went, I was really nervous, so I over-studied," said Tom Rhodes in a Washington Post article on Viva Vietnam published 15 April 1995. "I can tell you about Dien Bien Phu and the French getting their {behinds} kicked and General Giap. I didn't want to look like Pauly Shore walking around a college campus. I wanted to know everything".

Highlights of the special include Tom:

- Getting carted around Hung Vuong Road in Ho Chi Minh City on a bike taxi.
- Visiting a bar in Saigon called "Apocalypse Now."
- Eating bat and cobra meat at a Vietnamese restaurant where waiters kill the food, then offer its blood to patrons as a drink.
- Riding amusement park rides, such as real stuffed animals, on what Tom dubs "The Endangered-Species-Go-Round" in Vien Bao Tang Park.
- Visiting a Hard Rock Cafe knockoff. It humorously has no real music memorabilia.
- Shooting an M16 rifle and AK-47 at a firing range which charged a dollar a bullet.
- Interviewing a Vietnamese comedy troupe who says their influences are Joe Piscapo and SNL's Mr. Bill.
- Burrowing inside Viet Cong Cu Chi tunnels.
- Playing Rock 'Em Sock 'Em Robots with local Vietnam children.
- Setting up a Slip 'n Slide on China Beach, the beach featured in Francis Ford Coppola's Apocalypse Now.

During filming, Rhodes, true to his pacifist beliefs, gets uncomfortable crawling in the Cu Chi tunnels. While in the tunnels, he stops and says "I just don't feel funny." He later commented that he could feel presence of death that occurred inside.

== Reception ==
Viva Vietnam premiered on Comedy Central on April 30, 1995, the 20th Anniversary of the end of the Vietnam War. There was a special screening of the special held for Vietnam veterans and government officials from Republic of Vietnam in Washington D.C. on April 13, 1995 with Tom and his father David in attendance. While in DC, Tom and David visited the Vietnam Veterans Memorial wall, where David could reflect on other veterans he knew and fought alongside. David B. Rhodes III was a decorated veteran of Vietnam and a member of the Vietnam Veterans Helicopter Pilots Association. Tom learned all about the Vietnam war from his father, who often brought Tom to his veteran meetings when he was a child.

Rhodes called watching people from opposing sides of a war laughing at his jokes in the back of the theater a Charlie Chaplin-moment and was proud of the work he had done. He said the special was his father's proudest moment of him. It received a standing ovation at the end of the premiere. Many veterans were interviewed and said that not all of their time over there was bad and that laughing at the special could be healthy for reflection.
