= Golden Glory =

Muay Thai, kickboxing and MMA team based in the Netherlands

- Est.: 1999 (start); 2012 (defunct)
- Founded by: Bas Boon; Frederico Lapenda
- Primary owners: Bas Boon Knock Out Investments
- Primary trainers: Cor Hemmers; Dave Jonkers; Martijn de Jong
- Past titleholders: Semmy Schilt 9th King of Pancrase (1999); Alistair Overeem (K-1 Grand Prix 2010); Daniel Ghiță (Former It's Showtime Heavyweight Champion); Marloes Coenen (Former Strikeforce Women's Welterweight Champion)
- Training facilities: Breda, Netherlands; Bucharest, Romania; Pattaya, Thailand; Berlin, Germany; İstanbul, Turkey

Golden Glory was a Muay Thai, kickboxing and mixed martial arts camp and management team, based in the Netherlands.

== Description ==
Golden Glory was founded in 1999 by Bas Boon and Frederico Lapenda. Golden Glory's professional MMA and kickboxing roster included Semmy Schilt, Gilbert Yvel, Ilonka Elmont, Ramon Dekkers, Alistair Overeem, Marloes Coenen, Sergei Kharitonov, Gokhan Saki, Errol Zimmerman, Jon Olav Einemo, Ashwin Balrak, Nieky Holzken, Chalid Arrab, Bas Rutten and Alexandru Lungu who have fought in promotions such as K-1, Shooto, K-1 HERO'S, Pancrase, PRIDE FC, DREAM, Strikeforce, and the UFC.

The founders of Golden Glory also founded the World Vale Tudo Championships, a tournament which featured champions the likes of Oleg Taktarov, Mark Kerr, Pedro Rizzo, and Marco Ruas.

At the beginning of 2009, in January, Golden Glory opened a dojo in Bucharest, Romania in the presence of Bas Boon, Dave Jonkers and Semmy Schilt. After the successful opening of the Golden Glory Romania gym - Golden Glory also opened a gym in Pattaya, Thailand. In November 2010 opened in Berlin, Germany a Golden Glory Gym as well as Golden Glory Turkey, Georgia, Moscow, England.

In October 2010 Golden Glory announced plans to open a satellite gym in Huntington Beach, California, USA.

In the summer of 2011, in the wake of Alistair Overeem's removal from the Strikeforce Heavyweight Grand Prix a dispute emerged between the management of Golden Glory and the Zuffa organization which led to the termination of Valentijn Overeem, Jon Olav Einemo and Marloes Coenen's contracts with the UFC and Strikeforce.

In 2012, Golden Glory was bought and absorbed by the new kickboxing organization Glory. A number of people formerly involved with the Golden Glory team became Glory consultants.

== Notable fighters ==
- Chalid Arrab
- Ilonka Elmont
- Marloes Coenen
- Daniel Ghiță
- Heath Herring
- Nieky Holzken
- Aziz Jahjah
- Igor Jurković
- Ruslan Karaev
- Sergei Kharitonov
- Davit Kiria
- Stefan Leko
- Alexandru Lungu
- Alistair Overeem
- Valentijn Overeem
- Robin van Roosmalen
- Gökhan Saki
- Semmy Schilt
- Ciprian Sora
- Errol Zimmerman
- Ramon Dekkers
- Martijn de Jong
- Remco Pardoel
- Bas Rutten

== See also ==
- List of Top Professional MMA Training Camps
- Glory World Series
