= Barbara Kathmann =

Dutch politician (born 1978)

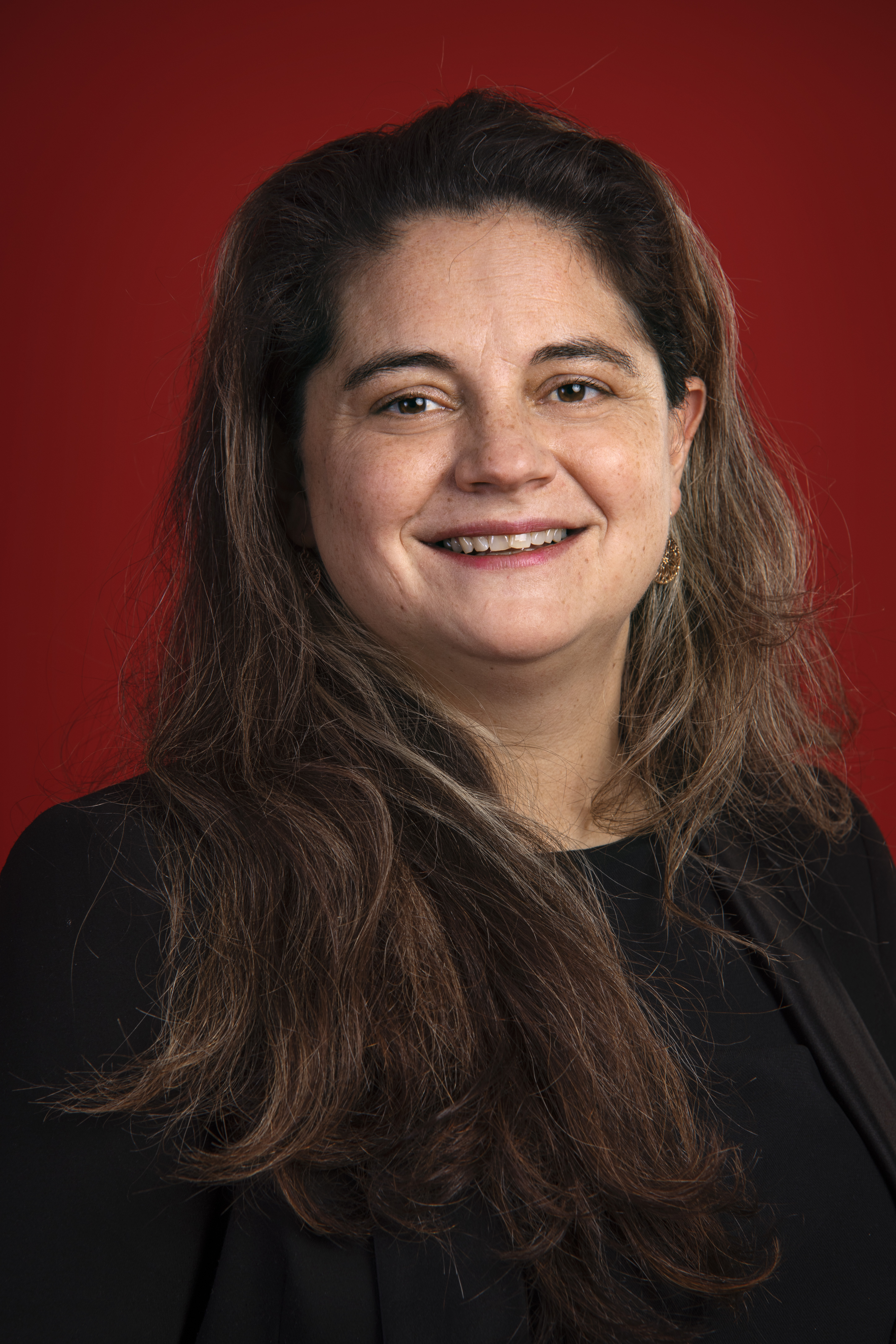

Member of the House of Representatives
- Incumbent
- Assumed office 31 March 2021

Alderwoman in Rotterdam
- In office 5 July 2018 – 13 February 2021
- Succeeded by: Roos Vermeij

Member of the Rotterdam municipal council
- In office 27 March 2014 – 5 July 2018
- Succeeded by: Kevin van Eikeren

Personal details
- Born: Barbara Catharina Kathmann; 12 May 1978 (age 48) Rotterdam, Netherlands
- Party: Labour Party (until 2026); PRO (since 2026)
- Spouse: Huib Lloyd
- Children: 3
- Education: Utrecht University

Barbara Catharina Kathmann (born 12 May 1978) is a Dutch politician, serving as a member of the House of Representatives since 2021. She is a member of Progressief Nederland (PRO), formerly of the Labour Party (PvdA). Before being elected to the House, she served as a municipal councilor and alderwoman in her hometown Rotterdam. Kathmann has also worked in media and at two nonprofit organizations.

== Early life and non-political career ==
She was born in 1978 in Rotterdam as the daughter of an architect and a nurse and grew up in the neighborhood Spangen. She has an older brother and an older sister. Kathmann attended the Rotterdamsch Lyceum at vwo level from 1990 until 1997 and subsequently studied law at Utrecht University. In 1999, she took a job as account manager at the Bureau voor Managementondersteuning, a management consultancy firm, and started studying history of international relations at the same university. Kathmann would finish that study in 2007.

She joined the new pragmatic idealistic radio and television broadcaster LLiNK in 2004, the year before it became part of the Dutch public broadcasting system. There, she served as senior editor, host, and correspondent. Kathmann also started working as a voice-over. LLiNK ceased broadcasting in 2010, as the NPO would not carry its programming anymore. That year, she and her then boyfriend established the foundation Jarige Job (Birthday boy), which gifts boxes with supplies to celebrate a birthday to children living in poverty. She served as its director for two years. Simultaneously, she worked as an editor and producer at CCCP, a creator of television programs and marketing content.

In 2012, Kathmann became project manager at the Giovanni van Bronckhorst Foundation, which offers a sports education program to help children in their last two years of primary school, when it was founded. She was promoted to director and remained in that position until her appointment as alderwoman in Rotterdam.

== Politics ==
Kathmann was elected to the Rotterdam municipal council in the 2014 municipal elections. She was the Labour Party's second candidate and became deputy caucus leader. In the council, Kathmann focussed on sustainability and mobility. She was her party's lead candidate in the 2018 municipal election in Rotterdam and campaigned on addressing inequality by creating jobs. She was re-elected and became her party's caucus leader.

In July 2018, when a new coalition had been formed, she left the council to become alderwoman of economy, neighborhoods, and villages. Kathmann also appeared 41st on the PvdA's party list during the 2019 provincial election in South Holland. As alderwoman, she was responsible for preparing the Hook of Holland ferry for a potential no-deal Brexit. Furthermore, Kathmann started a pilot that turned about 90 retail properties into residential ones in order to combat vacancy. For the same reason, she founded a taskforce to reduce the number of shopping areas and to decrease the sizes of others. During the COVID-19 pandemic, Kathmann and the alderman of finance announced that entrepreneurs and independent contractors could postpone paying local taxes. She was also involved in Rotterdam's plan to revive the economy, which included a retraining program and €233 million in funding for seven construction projects to add green spaces.

=== House of Representatives ===
She ran for member of parliament in the 2021 general election, being placed seventh on the Labour Party's list. In February 2021, Kathmann resigned from her position as alderwoman to campaign. She was sworn in as House member on 31 March after she had been elected with 4,780 preference votes. Kathmann became the Labour Party's spokesperson for security, justice, and the interior. Her portfolio later changed to social affairs, employment, economic affairs, and climate. Kathmann is also the secretary of the Labour Party caucus.

She wrote an opinion piece with Kati Piri in 2022, in which they stated that corporations had become addicted to migrant workers. According to them, this should be addressed through higher wages and through tackling violations of labor laws. Kathmann also co-filed an amendment to shorten the term for personal debt restructuring from three to one and a half years. It received the support from a majority of the House. In 2023, she continued a 2017 effort by her party to introduce the right to disconnect. She argued that anxiety about short-term contracts was pressuring employees into engaging in work-related activities outside of work hours. To accommodate for occupations that deal with emergencies, the bill would not provide an absolute right to not be disturbed, but it would force employers to have a conversation with their workers. Furthermore, Kathmann successfully defended a bill in the Senate to replace the monthly minimum wage in favor of an hourly one together with Senna Maatoug (GroenLinks). The monthly minimum wage caused full-time employees to receive the same salary whether they worked 36 or 40 hours per week.

Kathmann was re-elected in November 2023 on the shared GroenLinks–PvdA list, and her specialties changed to digital affairs and privacy. Along with Hanneke van der Werf (D66), she advocated for an age rating system for social media platforms to protect children against negative effects. She also argued that internet access providers should be compelled to offer significantly discounted subscriptions to those living in poverty, calling it a basic need.

=== House committee assignments ===
==== 2021–2023 term ====
- Committee for Digital Affairs
- Committee for Economic Affairs and Climate Policy
- Committee for the Interior
- Committee for Justice and Security
- Committee for Kingdom Relations
- Public Expenditure committee
- Committee for Social Affairs and Employment
- Procedure Committee
- Parliamentary inquiry into natural gas extraction Groningen

==== 2023–present term ====
- Committee for the Interior
- Committee for Economic Affairs
- Committee for Digital Affairs
- Committee for Asylum and Migration

== Personal life ==
She lives in Rotterdam and is married to Huib Lloyd, who she met at a hockey club during her childhood. They have three sons.

== Electoral history ==
Electoral history of Barbara Kathmann
Year	Body	Party	Pos.	Votes	Result		Ref.
Year	Body	Party	Pos.	Votes	Party seats	Individual	Ref.
2021	House of Representatives	Labour Party	7	4,780	9	Won	
2023	House of Representatives	GroenLinks–PvdA	18	10,665	25	Won	
2025	House of Representatives	GroenLinks–PvdA	32	29,633	20	Won (Note: Kathmann received enough preference votes to be elected despite her party's result.)	
