= Bart Spring in 't Veld =

Dutch television producer and reality television star

- Born: 18 September 1976 (age 49); Roelofarendsveen, South Holland, Netherlands
- Television: Big Brother (winner)

Bart Spring in 't Veld (born 18 September 1976 in Roelofarendsveen) is a Dutch television producer and the first winner of Big Brother in the world: in 1999, he won the first season in the Netherlands. Ever since then, he has been trying to rid himself of the image created by the show that he claimed 'stole [his] life'.

In an interview with The Times newspaper in the United Kingdom, Spring in 't Veld revealed having suffered five breakdowns in the past eight years as he tried to get back his privacy, now in distaste over the celebrity culture, quoting:

"If it's true that I helped to create that mindless monster, I'm not too proud of it... Big Brother took away the need to make inspiring programmes and replaced them with mindless chatter. It's time to put it in a museum for weird artifacts of television history."
