= Ilonka Elmont =

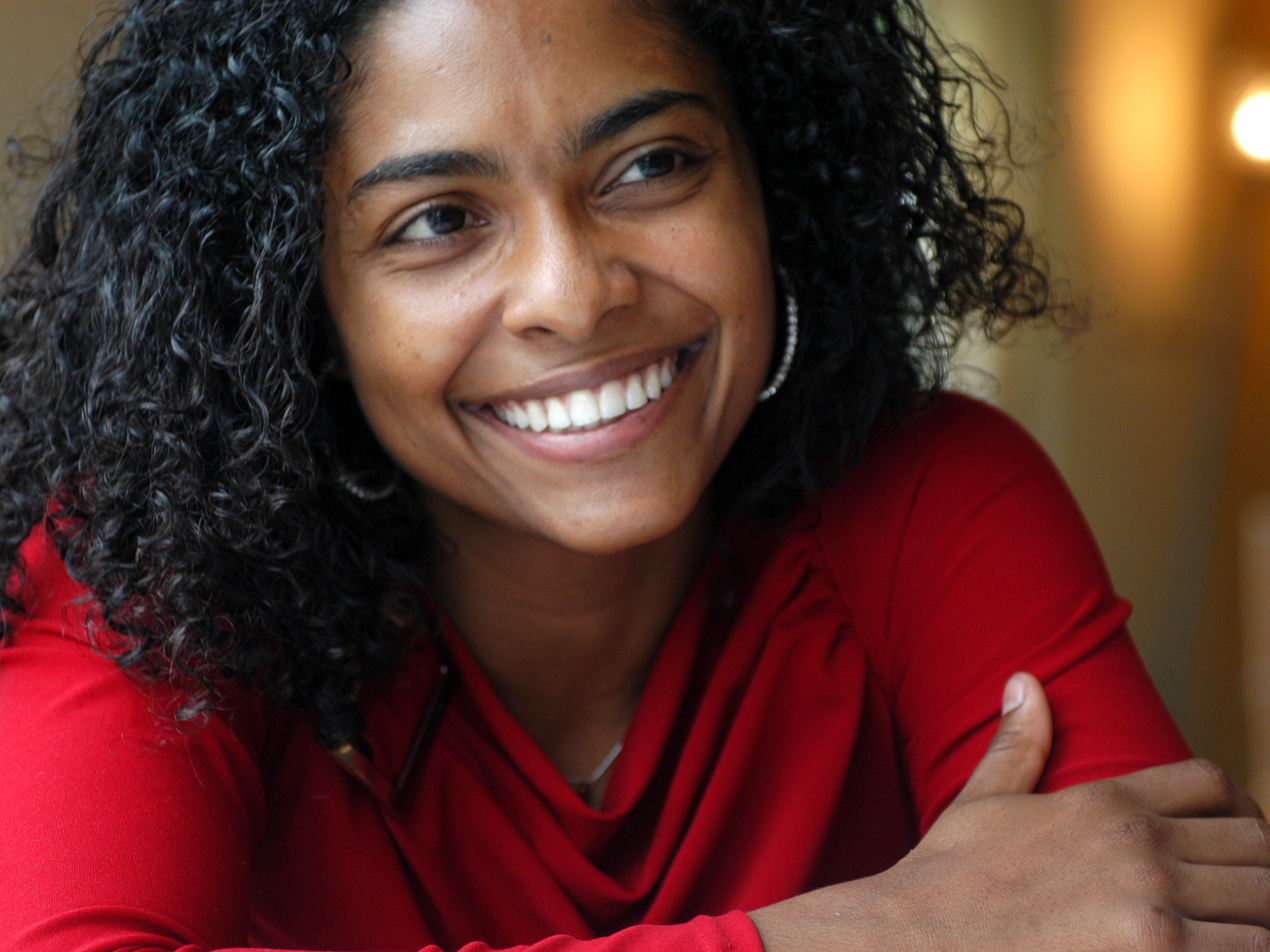
- Born: Ilonka Giovanna Elmont; 11 September 1974 (age 52); Paramaribo, Suriname
- Nickname: Killer Queen
- Height: 1.62 m (5 ft 4 in)
- Weight: 51 kg (112 lb; 8 st)
- Division: Flyweight
- Style: Kickboxing, Muay Thai
- Fighting out of: Amsterdam, Netherlands
- Team: Fighting Factory Carbin (FFC); Golden Glory (2000-2005)
- Trainer: Lucien Carbin
- Years active: 1997 -

Kickboxing record
- Total: 44
- Wins: 40
- By knockout: 17
- Losses: 3
- Draws: 1

Other information
- Occupation: professional athlete coach
- Boxing record from BoxRec

Ilonka Giovanna Elmont (born September 11, 1974) is a Surinamese-Dutch retired professional Muay Thai kickboxer. She is a seven-time World Champion, a European Champion and a two-time Dutch Champion in the Fly-Weight division (-50.80 kg - 52.16 kg). Elmont was a professional competitor since 1997. She competed in the 2H2H, SLAMM events, Danger Zone events and holds world titles of various fighting organizations such as WMTC, MTBN, IMKO, EPMTF, NKBB.

Elmont was known for her unorthodox fighting style with fast combinations and stinging knees. She is a technical all-round and skilled fighter with powerful kicks and knee strikes and clinching. With her unorthodox fighting style she surprised many experienced fighters and had a tendency to go head-to-head with her opponents. She is known as one of the top ranked female fighters of the Netherlands such as Lucia Rijker, Marloes Coenen, Germaine de Randamie and Denise Kielholtz.

== Early life ==
Ilonka was born in Paramaribo, Suriname. Raised by her grandparents her and at the age of nine, she moved to the Amsterdam to live with her parents. As a young child Ilonka had lots of energy but wasn't allowed to do martial arts.

== Fighting career ==
Elmont started her martial arts career at late age. Jerry Morris, former multiple world champion, invited her to visit Kops Gym and train. Although Ilonka wasn't really interested she participated. Resulting that the legendary trainer, former world champion, currently one of the World's most respected and successful coaches Lucien Carbin noticed her talent and challenged it to the max. Her fighting style, the blend of passion, talent and ambition Lucien saw and combined with his training program resulted in seven world titles, one European title and two Dutch titles.

Not long after their collaboration Lucien founded his own gym Fighting Factory Carbin in Amsterdam, which is considered one of the best martial arts gyms in the Netherlands. Carbin brought up 49 multiple world champions in different versions of martial arts notable names. Elmonts stable mates were Gilbert Yvel, Alistair Overeem, Tyrone Spong, Andy Ristie, Sergio Wielzen. Till now Ilonka Elmont is the only female multiple world champion that Lucien has raised amongst all those men.

In 1999 Elmont joined the 1st Golden Glory Team with MMA and Kickboxing rosters as Gilbert Yvel, Valentijn Overeem, Alistair Overeem, Ramon Dekkers, Stephan Tapilatu, Remco Pardoel, Martijn de Jong, Heath Herring, Semmy Schilt and others. During her fighting career Elmont fought many notable fighters from all over the world in and above her weight division.

== Championships and accomplishments ==
Elmont held the following titles:

- World Champion IMKO –50,8KG
- World Champion WPKL –50,8KG
- World Champion IMKO –51,0KG
- World Champion WPKL -52,1KG
- World Champion WMTC –51,5KG
- World Champion WPKL –50,8KG
- World Champion WMTC –51,5KG
- European Champion EPMTF –50,8KG
- Dutch Champion NKBB –50,8KG
- Dutch Champion MTBN –52,1KG

=== Records ===
- 1999 WPKL style price of the event
- 2000 WPKL style price of the event
- 2000 Ranked 19th place of the Rings Top 25 fighters
- 2001 - 2003 Nominated for the Best female fighter of the year

=== Other achievements ===
- 2005 Ambassador of Peoples Trust Foundation
- 2001 Honorary citizen of Amsterdam South East
- 2008 Ambassador Unicef Sport for Development Suriname & Guyana's

== Filmography ==
=== Movies ===
Elmont acted in the following movies and series:

- Color me bad as Karin
- Schimmen as an enemy; pilot serie directed by Roef Ragas
- Van Speijk as Myrna Griffith and Nathalja (7 episodes)

=== TV appearances as self ===
- Waar is de Mol (2008)
- Spuiten en Slikken (BNN, 2008)
- Mike & Thomas Show (2007) and video
- Jensen (Yorin, 2006)
- Rallarsving (Swedish Television series, episode 1, 2005) and video
- Try before you die start at 11.26 (BNN, 2005)
- Fight the Virus AIDS Campaign (2005)
- Katja vs Bridget as the trainer of Katja (BNN, 2005)
- Barend en Van Dorp (RTL4, 2004)
- Gemma Glitter (NPO, 2004)
- Lijn 4 (BNN, 2004)
- Kevin Masters starring Thom Rhodes (2003) and video
- Week van Willibrord (SBS6, 2003)
- Menno Buch following opponent Cunera Cremers during Dutch title fight in Ahoy, Rotterdam (Veronica, 2000)
- Klokhuis (NTR, 2003)
- De smaak politie (SBS6, 2003)
- Life and Cooking (2000)
- Later wordt het leuk (VARA, 2000)
- Vals plat with Gilbert Yvel (NPS, 1999)

=== Documentaries ===
- Pioneers Veronica Fight video (2019)
- Iedereen Verlicht (2019)
- The Killer Queen (2004)
- Fighting Factory (Video) by Wout Kist
- Ton Vechters deel 1 (video) hosted by Ton van Rooyen
- Ton Vechters deel 2 (video) hosted by Ton van Rooyen

== Personal life and other work ==
Elmont became a mother in 2009, she has a son named Jaedon.

Elmont is an ambassador of Ilonka Elmont Foundation which contributes to the sports development for underprivileged children and children with a disability by creating awareness, new chances in the underprivileged communities.

== See also ==
- List of female kickboxers
- Kickboxing
- Dutch kickboxing
