= Hot Sweet Ass =

Live album by Tom Rhodes
- Released: 2005
- Recorded: December 7, 2005
- Genre: Comedy
- Label: Stand Up! Records

Tom Rhodes chronology
Hot Sweet Ass (2005)	Live in Paris (2006)

Hot Sweet Ass is Tom Rhodes' debut live album. It was recorded at the Laff Stop in Houston, Texas.

== Track listing ==
1. "Where I'm From and What I've Seen"
2. "The Power of Love"
3. "Magnificent Sunrises"
4. "I Love Everything Mexican"
5. "Cowboys and Cadillacs"
6. "Arm the Teachers"
7. "Mix the Races"
8. "Random Voodoo"
9. "Adventures of a Comedian"
10. "Amsterdam Epiphanies"
11. "Gargantuan Advice"
12. "Every Man's Secret"
