= Scientific celebrity =

Scientists well-known to the public

A scientific celebrity, also known as a celebrity scientist or public scientist, is a scientist who has gained significant public attention, usually through the media. For the general public, scientific celebrities serve to represent science or a field of science. In some instances this can be self-serving in nature or can be at the behest of governmental or corporate interests or to promote the science involved.

With new scientific discoveries scientists come to be publicly known for their contributions. Although this type of recognition has become more common in recent times (coincidental with the rise of celebrity culture), the phenomenon is centuries old. Media attention to science became more pervasive beginning in the late 1960s and early 1970s as the variety of media outlets increased and they gave greater attention to scientific progress. Scientific celebrities have had a significant role in the popularization of science.

== Historical examples ==
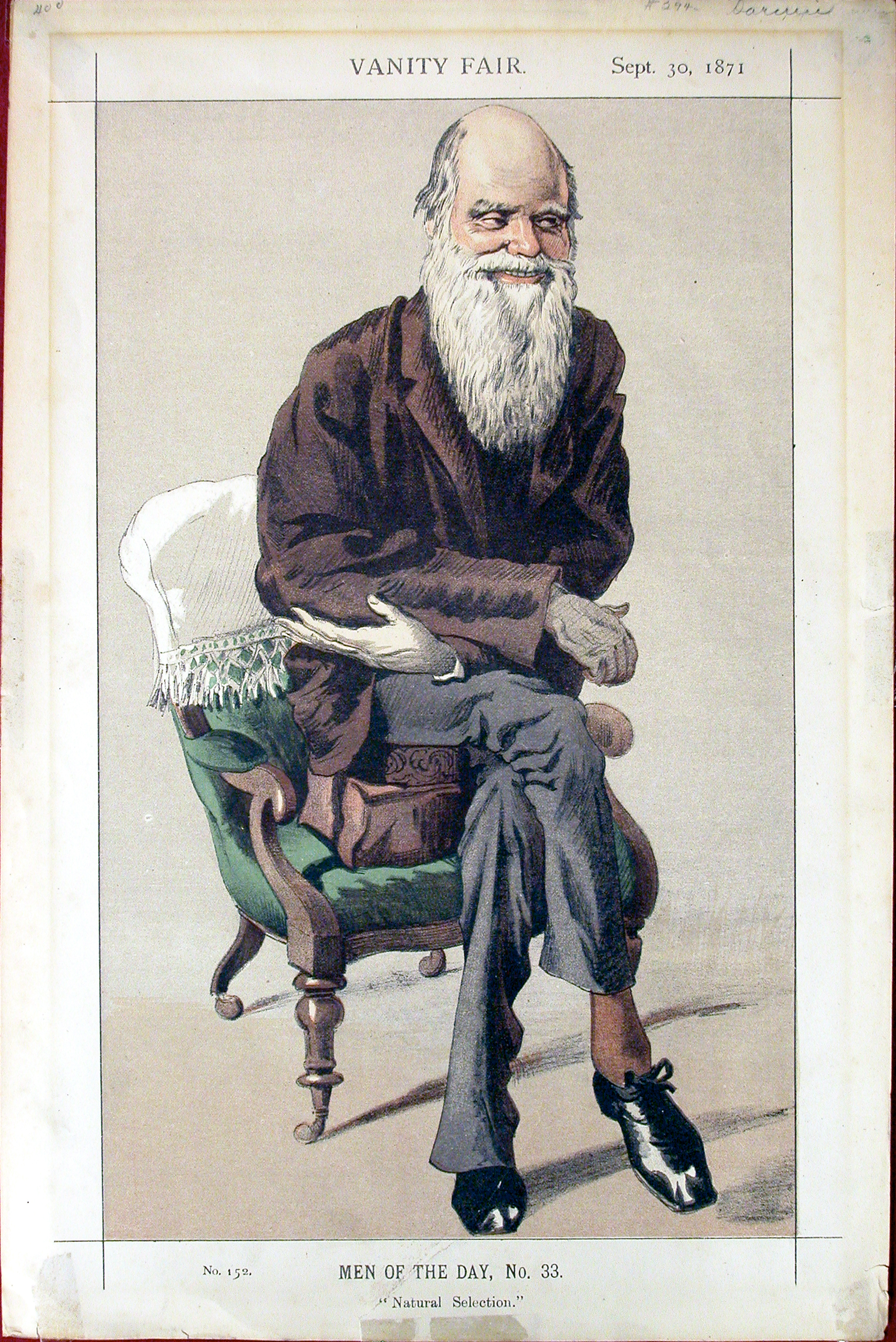
Caricature of Charles Darwin from Vanity Fair magazine in 1871

In the late 17th century and early 18th century, Isaac Newton became widely known in the United Kingdom and much of the western world after he published his theories of motion. Others, including Voltaire, promoted Newton's reputation; although Newton did not actively promote himself.

Charles Darwin pursued popularity among the general public following his 1859 publication of his book On the Origin of Species which explained his theory of evolution. This included distribution of mass-produced photographs of himself and his projects. He carefully selected interviews and public appearances. He responded to his mail with pre-printed responses. Darwin made available low cost editions of his book for reading by the general public. Statuettes of a chimpanzee contemplating a human skull became widely available following the rise of Darwin's fame.

== Modern examples ==
By 1919, shortly after Albert Einstein published his seminal work on the General Theory of Relativity, he became well known among the general public around the world. By then, experimental data appeared to support Einstein's theories, and this revolutionary new way of thinking of the physical world commanded significant public attention. Science historian Abraham Pais wrote, “Einstein, creator of some of the best science of all time, is himself a creation of the media in so far as he is and remains a public figure.” Einstein's rise to celebrity status is traceable to November 1919 as major news outlets such as The Times (of London) and The New York Times reported on the scientific breakthroughs. Einstein was at times uncomfortable with his celebrity status, as it compromised his privacy. However, he used his fame to advance social causes for which he had strong conviction, such as Zionism, nuclear disarmament, civil rights, and pacifism.

Astronomer Fred Hoyle rose to prominence by 1950, especially in the United Kingdom. He hosted a series of radio broadcasts by the BBC entitled, "The Nature of the Universe". Hoyle was for a time among the most popular broadcasters in the United Kingdom, and the book version of his radio broadcast was a bestseller.

In the latter part of the 20th century and early 21st century, cosmologist Stephen Hawking achieved celebrity status. This was initially through his research publications on black holes and other aspects of cosmology. In 1988, he published A Brief History of Time, which was a book that provided insight into cosmology for the general public. Hawking's celebrity status grew rapidly, and his involvement in popular culture was perpetuated through television and radio appearances, biographical books, and being the subject of a movie, The Theory of Everything. At times, Hawking suffered from public scrutiny of his private life.

Brian Cox, British physicist and science presenter, can be considered a living example of a scientific celebrity, as he has presented multiple scientific programs and appeared on different talk shows, such as The Late Show With Stephen Colbert and others.

Lists of notable English language popularizers of science and of science communicators are available.

== The Sagan Effect ==
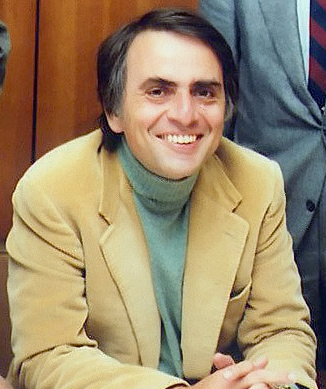
Carl Sagan

Carl Sagan was an accomplished researcher in the field of planetary science by the time he published his 1977 book The Dragons of Eden, on the evolution of human intelligence, targeted for general, non-scientific audiences. With this book, Sagan earned the Pulitzer Prize and became famous. In 1980, Sagan hosted the television series Cosmos: A Personal Voyage, which cemented his status as a scientific celebrity. Time Magazine called Sagan "America's most effective salesman of science."

Sagan was a university professor at the time that he first achieved celebrity status. Influential academic peers perceived Sagan as a popularizer of science and not a serious scholar. He was denied academic tenure at Harvard University, despite his significant achievements as an independent researcher. (He later became a full professor at Cornell University.) Science historian Michael Shermer termed this the "Sagan Effect." This form of academic snobbery has applied to some other scientific celebrities, including Paleontologist Stephen Jay Gould. A 2016 discussion of the Sagan Effect indicated that the effect was continuing to persist at that time, even though it may be in decline as academic institutions have become more engaged in public outreach.

== Role of the media ==
The means of media reporting on science and the amount of science reporting have evolved significantly since science reporting first began, just as it has with journalism on most subjects. Early on, scientists gained the publicity necessary for celebrity status through traditional print media, including newspapers, magazines, pamphlets and mailings. The lecture circuit was another means, especially for self-promotion. By the middle of the 20th century, broadcast media such as television and radio and eventually cable television became important outlets. The rise of digital media enabled scientist to directly address the general public. Many other people have become known to the public as a result of media promotion. Heads of state, heads of governmental units and religious leaders have long received this type of media attention in representing interests other than their own. Scientific celebrity is similar, and C. Everett Koop is an example of a scientific celebrity who gained celebrity status through his work for a governmental agency, as Surgeon General of the United States.

A further form of scientific outreach in the digital age is TED Talks. Science is one of the basic themes of Ted Talks, and examples of scientific celebrities who have presented TED Talks include E.O. Wilson, Barry Schwartz, Richard Dawkins, Steven Pinker, Brian Greene, and Laura Boykin, among others.

A survey indicates that public acceptance of scientific concepts, particularly evolution, depends on the celebrity scientists who advocate it and on the other concepts that the celebrity advocates. Amy Unsworth and David Voas found that acceptance of evolution could decrease among some religious groups if it is advocated by a celebrity scientist who is perceived as having negative views of the religion, such as Richard Dawkins.

== Science by press release ==
At times, some scientists have inappropriately or prematurely publicized their research findings in the media, by press release or press conference. This has typically occurred when the findings have questionable scientific merit, and the scientists appeal directly to the general public. At times the host institution is complicit. This type of science by press release is seen as an example of pathological science. Cold fusion is an example of this behavior.

== Media celebrities ==
Some television presenters such as Richard Attenborough, Patrick Moore and David Attenborough have scientific qualifications, and some like Bill Nye have engineering qualifications, but these presenters are primarily known for their own presentations of scientific topics rather than their contributions to the advance of scientific knowledge. Some media outlets have science editors or science reporters who are specifically tasked with reporting on scientific developments. These people often do not have scientific training but rather are professional journalists, a notable example being Jules Bergman of ABC-TV in the United States.

Actor Alan Alda has taken up the cause of aiding scientists in communicating with the general public. His efforts are not limited to scientific celebrities and include scientists that are not well known. Alda's method emphasizes improvisational techniques.

Some celebrities are known for their roles in the media but not for their work in science, such as Mayim Bialik, one of the stars of the television show The Big Bang Theory, who has a PhD in neuroscience. Another example is actress Danica McKellar who has published original research in the field of mathematics. Another is comedian and science writer Kasha Patel.

== See also ==
- Celebrity doctor
- Science communication
- Science communicators
- Notable science journalists
- Public awareness of science
- Science by press conference
- List of celebrities with advanced academic degrees
- Sociology of scientific knowledge
