= Marc de Hond =

Dutch television presenter (1977–2020)

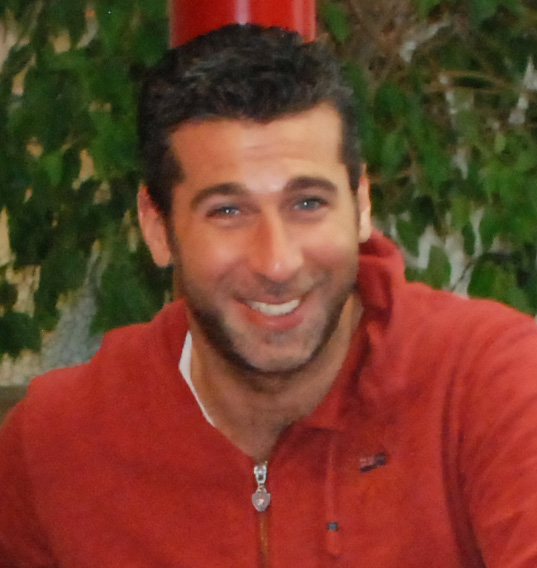
- De Hond in 2015

Personal information
- Full name: Marc David de Hond
- National team: Netherlands men's national wheelchair basketball team (2010–2012)
- Born: 21 September 1977
- Died: 3 June 2020 (aged 42)
- Occupations: Television presenter, businessman, writer, theatre performer, dj
- Years active: 2007–2020

Sport
- Sport: Wheelchair basketball

Marc David de Hond (21 September 1977 – 3 June 2020) was a Dutch television presenter, businessman, author, theatre performer, and played for the Dutch wheelchair basketball team. He was also a disc jockey for radio 3FM and Caz!.

He hosted the television programs Expedition Unlimited for LLiNK, De Rekenkamer for KRO at Nederland 3, and was a regular commentator for poker competitions broadcast by RTL 7. In August 2008, he published Kracht, a book about his rehabilitation after a spinal cord injury in 2002. Some of his solo theatre performances were Scherven brengen geluk in 2015, Wie bang is, krijgt ook klappen in 2016, and Voortschrijdend Inzicht in 2018.

== Career ==
=== Internet company ===
De Hond was born in Amsterdam. In 1996, he gave up studying economics at the age of 18 and started the internet companies Hatchoo with Mark Götz, and Veiling.com. Hatchoo! (with a nod to Yahoo!) was a humorous site where famous internet pages from home and abroad were parodied. De Hond & Götz also wrote a monthly column for Net Magazine from 1998 to 2001. In 1999, De Hond Jurgens became a partner in the company. In the spring of 2000, they sold their successful internet auction site Veiling.com, based on the American site eBay, to German competitor Ricardo. De Hond, Götz, and Jurgens received shares in Ricardo; the amount involved in the deal was undisclosed. In his book, Power de Hond says that the sale of his company "made him one of the youngest internet millionaires in the Netherlands on paper when the value of his shares went up in a matter of months".

=== Wheelchair basketball ===
Documentary Continue (Marc de Hond as part of the wheelchair basketball team)

Beginning in 2007, De Hond played wheelchair basketball. Between 2007 and 2016, he played for BV Lely (now called Apollo Amsterdam), playing in Eredivisie. In February 2010, he became an ambassador for Fonds Gehandicaptensport (Disabled Sports Fund). Since the spring of 2010, he was part of the Netherlands men's national wheelchair basketball team. On 26 May 2010, he was selected by national team coach Gertjan van der Linden and made his international debut in a match against Germany. In September 2011, de Hond was a member of the Dutch team that participated at the European Championship in Nazareth. They finished in eighth place and missed qualifying for the Paralympic Games. After three years of full-time sports, de Hond retired from the national team at the end of 2012 to devote more time to his social career. He continued playing in Eredivisie: first with his club from Amsterdam, and from 2016 at BV Hoofddorp.

== Personal ==
De Hond was the son of Maurice de Hond and his wife, Jasmin Busnach. He began a relationship with the athlete Remona Fransen in 2011; they married in 2019. Around Christmas 2002, De Hond discovered a tumor in his spinal cord. In three surgeries, the tumor was removed, but one of the surgeries pinched nerves in his spinal cord. However, the medical staff did not intervene in time when complications arose, leaving him partially paralyzed. They had a son and a daughter together. In late 2018, de Hond was diagnosed with bladder cancer and died on 3 June 2020.
