= Frederico Lapenda =

American film producer

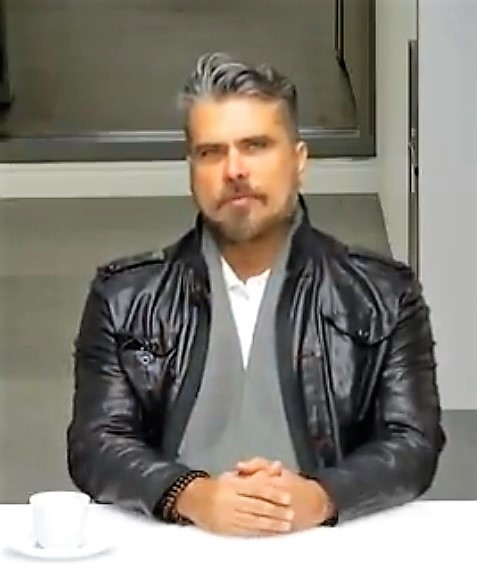
Lapenda in 2017

Frederico Lapenda is a movie producer and fight promoter. He is regarded as one of the founders of Mixed Martial Arts (MMA). Lapenda is credited, along with Ultimate Fighting Championship co-creator Art Davie, as being responsible for the globalization of MMA. Lapenda is also the president of the Beverly Hills Film Festival Grand Jury. He has produced feature films, vídeo games, MMA events, Master classes, and documentaries including Kidnapping and The Smashing Machine, which became a 60 million dollar movie featuring The Rock. He was appointed Brazilian Tourism Ambassador along with Ronaldinho, Vitor Belfort, Renzo Gracie, and Romero Britto.

He co-created Allies of the Amazon, a children's book about four super-powered talking animals who protect the Amazon rainforest with several authors, including Marvel Comics founder Stan Lee.

In 2011, Lapenda produced the first pay-per-view event on YouTube on his Fight Game Channel, broadcasting a Moscow event worldwide. In 1998, he became the first producer to broadcast MMA on US TV on channel 22 in Los Angeles. In 1997, he introduced PPV to Brazil with his World Vale Tudo Championship III (WVC) event in São Paulo, and in 1997, his WVC event aired on US PPV, making him just the fourth producer to promote MMA on US PPV.

== Career ==
The globalization of MMA occurred in 1995 when Lapenda, a transplant to Los Angeles, brought Brazilian fighter Marco Ruas to the United States. Ruas was introduced to audiences in UFC VI and went on to win UFC VII. During this time he created Ruas Vale Tudo, the prototype MMA cross-training style.

Lapenda created the Brazilian Dream Team, which was to bring major Brazilian fighters training together in Luta Livre, Brazilian Jiu-Jitsu, wrestling, and Muay Thai under Carlson Gracie. In 1995, Lapenda opened an academy near UCLA in Westwood, California, for Carlson Gracie and Vitor Belfort to teach and train. The Brazilian Dream Team eventually became the Brazilian Top Team.

In 1996, Lapenda decided to take the sport globally and created his own fighting event, the World Vale Tudo Championship (WVC), which debuted at NK Hall Bay auditorium in Japan. That first event had an eight-man tournament plus a super fight. Among the fighters were three of the six UFC champions: Steve Jennum, Oleg Taktarov and Marco Ruas. This was the first time a foreigner had promoted a martial arts fight in Japan and also the first time a UFC champion fought in Japan.

Pedro Rizzo, Mark Kerr, Heath Herring, and Igor Vovchanchyn all fought in the WVC during the second half of the '90s. All of these WVC fighters would go on to fight in either the UFC or for Pride in Japan, which would attract the largest audiences in the world. Lapenda followed WVC Japan with other international shows. During the 90s, Lapenda took MMA to Israel, Russia, Brazil, the Netherlands, Aruba, Jamaica, and Ukraine and produced over 100 shows. In 1998, he produced the first West Coast cable broadcast of mixed martial arts (Combate Mortal) on KWHY-TV.

He created the Golden Glory fighting team with Bas Boon in 1999. Golden Glory was a major competitor in K-1 and MMA for 10 years with fighters such as Semmy Schilt, Alistair Overeem, and Gokhan Saki. Lapenda also co-produced two of the first MMA theatrical documentaries, The Smashing Machine (HBO, 2002) and Rites of Passage: The Rebirth of Combat Sports (PPV, 2001). He introduced pay-per-view to Brazilian television and his WVC was the fourth MMA show to ever air on US PPV.

In 2002, Lapenda became a filmmaker/producer at Peter Guber's Mandalay Entertainment Group and then founded Paradigm Pictures. He has produced four programs for Fox Files, including Russian Night Life and Amsterdam: The Red Light District. In addition, he produced Ultimate Fighting Around the World and Underground Fighting in California. His feature film credits as producer include USS Indianapolis and Rage.
