= Frank Dane (presenter) =

Dutch radio DJ

Frank Kjærby Jensen (pseudonym Frank Dane) is a Dutch radio DJ and television presenter.

Jensen was born in 1981 and is the brother of television personality Robert Jensen.

== Career ==
Because of his more famous brother Robert, who was already frequently on radio and TV at the time, Frank used the pseudonym Frank Dane when he started as radio presenter at a local radio stations in 2001, Midvliet FM and Stadsradio Rotterdam. Afterwards he worked at major Dutch radio stations Radio 538, Yorin FM and Slam!FM. In 2007 he returned to 538, and in 2010 he transferred to 3FM to present a morning show Ontzettend Dikke Ochtend Frank. In 2012 he returned yet again to 538 to present an early evening show, Dane Doet 't which was January 2014 moved to the early afternoon.

In 2018 he succeeded popular Edwin Evers with the De 538 Ochtendshow met Frank Dane in the morning, which he presented until December 2021. Medio 2022 he would succeed the popular afternoon programming on 538, De Coen & Sander Show.

In 2016 Dane started occasionally presenting on the Dutch tabloid talk TV show RTL Boulevard, after which he would participate in multiple TV game shows as competitor and judge.
