= Roos Vermeij =

Dutch politician

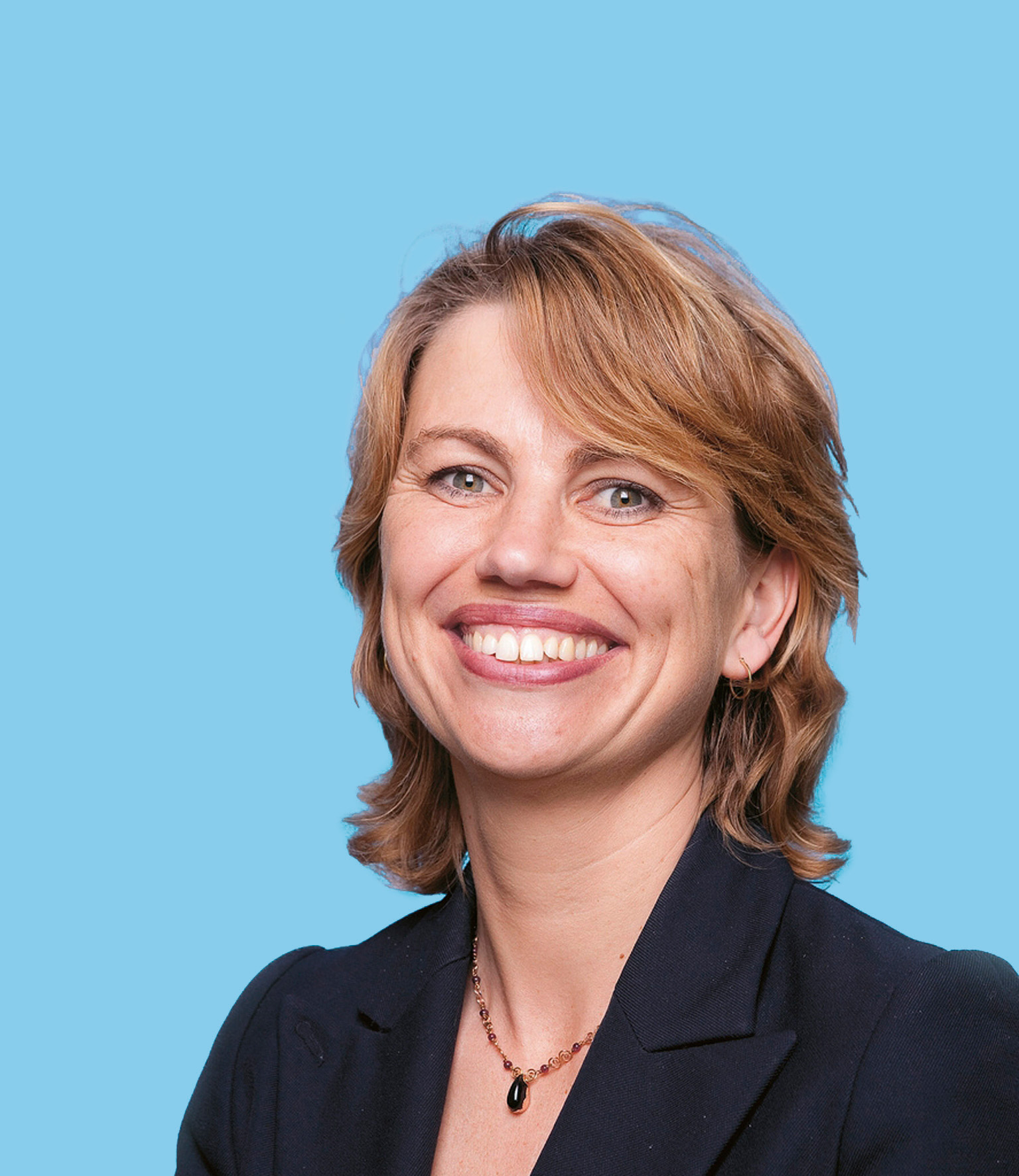

Member of the House of Representatives
- In office 30 November 2006 – 23 March 2017

Personal details
- Born: 28 March 1968 (age 58) The Hague
- Party: Labour Party
- Occupation: Politician

Rosemarijn Agnes (Roos) Vermeij (born March 28, 1968, in The Hague) is a Dutch politician. As a member of the Labour Party (Partij van de Arbeid) she was an MP between November 30, 2006, and March 23, 2017. She focused on matters of employment and social security.

She has been an alderwoman of Rotterdam since 18 February 2021, replacing Barbara Kathmann.

Vermeij studied history at Leiden University.

== Publications ==
- Roos Vermeij, De "vrouwendingen" van mej. mr. Marianne Tellegen. Leiden, Rijksuniversiteit, 1992
