= Big Brother (Dutch TV series) season 1 =

Big Brother
- Season 1
- Presented by: Rolf Wouters & Daphne Deckers
- No. of days: 106
- No. of housemates: 12
- Winner: Bart Spring in 't Veld
- Runner-up: Ruud Benard

Release
- Original network: Veronica
- Original release: 16 September – 30 December 1999

Season chronology
- Next → Season 2

Big Brother 1999 is the first season of the Dutch version of Big Brother, and also served as the debut season of the Big Brother franchise. The show ran between September 16 and December 30, 1999 for a total of 106 days and was broadcast by the Dutch television channel Veronica. The specially built house was located at a factory-site in Almere and presented by Rolf Wouters and Daphne Deckers.

== Development ==
The program was an instant hit and experienced exceptionally high ratings. Viewers and stream-watchers of internet forum FOK! alike were fascinated by the boredom and the group dynamics of the nine housemates. Brabant-born Ruud was considered to be the alpha male of the little community. This Burgundian became the darling of the public with his often repeated oneliners and his simple philosophies in the diary room. His lieutenant was the Frisian Willem, who took up the role of house cook. Hotly debated was the relation between the leading female, housewife Karin (who had recently been cured of cancer), and her much younger 'mate' Maurice. Also much talked about was a sex-scene between Bart and Sabine. The long-awaited action under the blankets was captured by the night-vision cameras in the bedroom.

The first-ever evicted housemate was Martin, who also vied for Sabine's attention and had accused Bart of being gay. He was voted out with 30% of the vote with Bart being a close second. The first-ever voluntary exit was for young Tara, who left after only nine days because of boredom. Much maligned was Amsterdam-born intruder Mona, who took her place. In the end, Willem betrayed his friend Ruud in the nominations, and Bart became the first-ever winner of Big Brother. He has won ƒ250,000.

During the season the housemates were visited by artists George Baker, Marco Borsato and Anouk. After they had left the house, both Tara and Sabine obtained photoshoots in the Dutch Playboy. The communally recorded song Big Brother and the tune Leef (Han van Eijk) reached number one in the pop charts.

== Housemates ==
=== Anouk ===
Anouk Drost was a 22-year-old account management student from Zeist. She entered on Day 48 and was evicted on Day 70.

=== Bart ===
Bart Spring in 't Veld was the first winner of Big Brother in the world. He was 22 when he entered and he was from Roelofarendsveen.

=== Bianca ===
Bianca Plune was a 25-year-old civil servant from Rotterdam. She entered on Day 1, and walked on Day 43 in exchange for 10,000 Guilder.

=== Cyrille ===
Cyrille van Hoof was a singer and dancer from Tilburg. She was 26 when she entered the house. She was evicted on Day 56 and entered on Day 48 with Anouk.

=== Karin ===
Karin van Elswijk was 39 years old and was the oldest female in the house. She was a housewife from Apeldoorn. She was the last remaining female and was evicted on Day 99.

=== Martin ===
Martin was the first-ever evictee in Big Brother. He was a 32-year-old company owner from Spijkenisse.

=== Maurice ===
Maurice was always struggling with ping pong, widely believed to be the main reason to be ousted early on the show.

=== Mona ===
Mona Rooth-de Leeuw was a 29-year-old barwoman from Amsterdam. She replaced Tara on Day 15 and she took a 10,000 Guilder bribe from Big Brother on Day 43.

=== Ruud ===
Ruud Benard was a 44-year-old sport masseur from Breda. He was the oldest housemate in the house and made it to the final, finishing second.

=== Sabine ===
Sabine Wendel was a 25-year-old fashion stylist from Tilburg. She was the second to be evicted on Day 36.

=== Tara ===
Tara van den Bergh was a 20-year-old police constable from Amsterdam. She became the first person to walk away. Tara left on Day 10 due to being bored.

=== Willem ===
Willem Boomsma was a 37-year-old cook from Lemmer. He made it to the final and finished third.

== Nominations table ==
	Week 1	Week 2	Week 5	Week 7	Week 9	Week 11	Week 13	Week 14 Final		Nominations received
Bart	Tara, Willem	Bianca, Mona	No; Nominations	Cyrille, Karin	Anouk, Ruud	Maurice, Willem	Karin, Willem	Winner (Day 106)		18
Ruud	Bianca, Karin	Karin, Sabine	No; Nominations	Anouk, Cyrille	Anouk, Maurice	Karin, Maurice	Bart, Karin	Runner-up (Day 106)		6
Willem	Bianca, Karin	Bart, Sabine	No; Nominations	Anouk, Cyrille	Anouk, Bart	Bart, Karin	Bart, Ruud	Third place (Day 106)		6
Karin	Martin, Tara	Bart, Sabine	No; Nominations	Anouk, Ruud	Anouk, Bart	Bart, Ruud	Bart, Ruud	Evicted (Day 99)		11
Maurice	Martin, Willem	Bart, Sabine	No; Nominations	Anouk, Bart	Anouk, Bart	Bart, Ruud	Evicted (Day 84)			7
Anouk	Not in House			Cyrille, Maurice	Bart, Maurice	Evicted (Day 70)				10
Cyrille	Not in House			Anouk, Bart	Evicted (Day 56)					4
Bianca	Martin, Tara	Bart, Sabine	No; Nominations	Walked (Day 43)						4
Mona	Not in House	Bianca, Maurice	No nominations	Walked (Day 43)						1
Sabine	Karin, Willem	Karin, Maurice	Evicted (Day 36)							5
Tara	Bart, Karin	Walked (Day 10)								3
Martin	Bart, Willem	Evicted (Day 8)								3
Notes	none		1	none				2		
Against public vote	Bart, Karin, Martin, Tara, Willem	Bart, Sabine	none	Anouk, Cyrille	Anouk, Bart	Bart, Karin, Maurice, Ruud	Bart, Karin, Ruud	Bart, Ruud, Willem		
Walked	none	Tara	Bianca, Mona	none						
Evicted	Martin; 30% to evict	Sabine; 84.45% to evict	None	Cyrille; 83.2% to evict	Anouk; 80.59% to evict	Maurice; 73.4% to evict	Karin; 56.1% to evict	Willem; 8.8% to win	Ruud; 43.4% to win	
Evicted	Martin; 30% to evict	Sabine; 84.45% to evict	None	Cyrille; 83.2% to evict	Anouk; 80.59% to evict	Maurice; 73.4% to evict	Karin; 56.1% to evict	Bart; 47.8% to win		

=== Notes ===
- ^Note 1 : There were no nominations this week. Big Brother offered the Housemates the choice of leaving the house voluntarily for the sum of 10,000 Guilder.
- ^Note 2 : This week, the public were voting for a winner, rather than to evict.
