= Juize =

Dutch Internet radio station

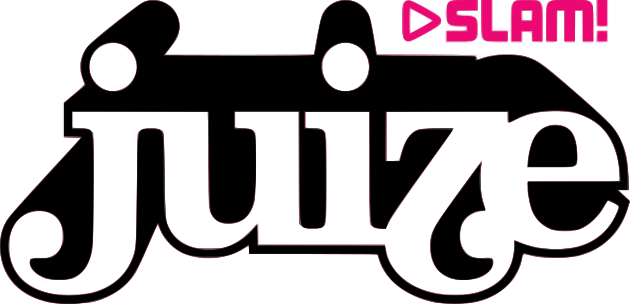

Netherlands
- Broadcast area: Netherlands (nationwide)

Programming
- Format: Hip hop and R&B

Ownership
- Owner: Radiocorp
- Sister stations: Slam!FM

History
- First air date: 18 July 2004
- Former names: Juize.FM (2004–2008); 538 Juize (2008–2012)

Links
- Webcast: Juize Webstream
- Website: www.juize.nl

Juize is a Dutch Internet radio station that focuses on hip hop and R&B music and is part of Radiocorp BV.

== History ==
In 1999, 538 started the hip-hop and contemporary R&B program Juize, which was presented by Niels Hoogland. On 18 July 2004 the radio station Juize.FM was established as a spin-off of this program. From 1 July 2005 to 1 December 2008, Juize.FM could be received in most of the Netherlands via digital cable by 4 million cable subscribers. Until 20 September 2011 the station was also available on satellite via Canal Digitaal. Exactly one year after the start the station started to air shows with hosts, including Niels Hoogland, Yes-R, DJ Jeff, Negativ and E-Life. Hoogland quit his daily radio show on 538 to dedicate more of his time to the expansion of Juize. Since 18 November 2008 there are no more such presented programs. On 2 September 2012 538 Juize aired for the last time on 538. After 13 years the program moved from 538 to Slam!FM. Since then, 538 Juize is known as just Juize.

After the acquisition an evening show launched on Slam!FM that aired every Sunday from 20:00 to 00:00 that was devoted to Juize, presented by DJ Jeff. The show featured (mostly Dutch) guests who were influential in the hip hop scene.
