= Edwin Evers =

Dutch drummer and radio presenter (born 1971)

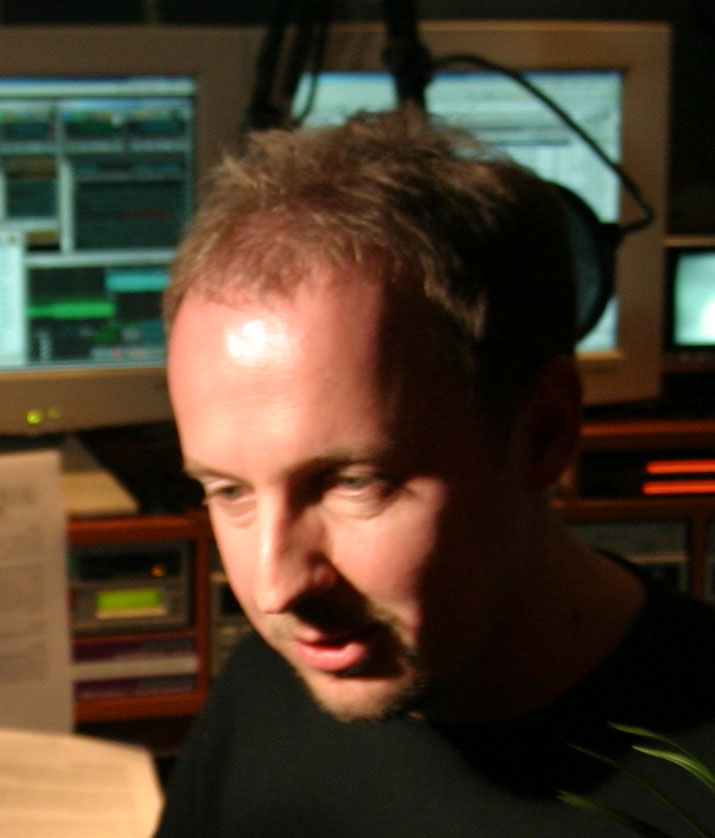
- Evers in 2005
- Born: Edwin Dinan Evers; 9 May 1971 (age 55); Hardenberg; Overijssel, Netherlands
- Presenting career
- Show: Evers staat op
- Station: Radio 538
- Time slot: 06:00 - 10:00 CET
- Style: Disc Jockey
- Country: Netherlands

Edwin Dinan Evers (May 9, 1971 in Hardenberg) is a Dutch drummer and radio presenter of the radio station Radio 538.

== Biography ==
Evers was born on 9 May 1971 in Hardenberg, the Netherlands, his first experience with radio was by the local broadcaster, also he turned on Saturday night at the local discothèque Celebration, in 1991 he was featured on the radio station Power FM, which broadcast until 1993. In 1992 he was hired by the public broadcaster Veronica Omroep Organisatie by Lex Harding, radio director at that moment, his first program by Veronica was Evers in het Wild for 3 years, in 1995 Veronica left the public order to start a commercial company with RTL and many presenters moved to this new commercial radio station which was called HitRadio Veronica, he and Robert Jensen were the hosts of the program Vrijdagavondkeet, in 1997 was announced that Evers will change to the public broadcaster KRO on Radio 3FM where he presents the program Evers staat op from 1998 to 2000 with the side kicks Cobus Bosscha and Rick Romijn, this program has a great popularity at that time.

== Current career ==
After the two years at the KRO on Radio 3FM, the program Evers staat op moved to Radio 538 in April 2000, Niels van Baarlen replaced Cobus Bosscha who stayed at the KRO. He is also a drummer of the formed Edwin Evers Band.

On 23 March 2018 Evers announced live on air that he’ll leave Radio 538 and his whole radio career somewhere at the end of 2018.
