= Jensen! =

Dutch late-night talk show

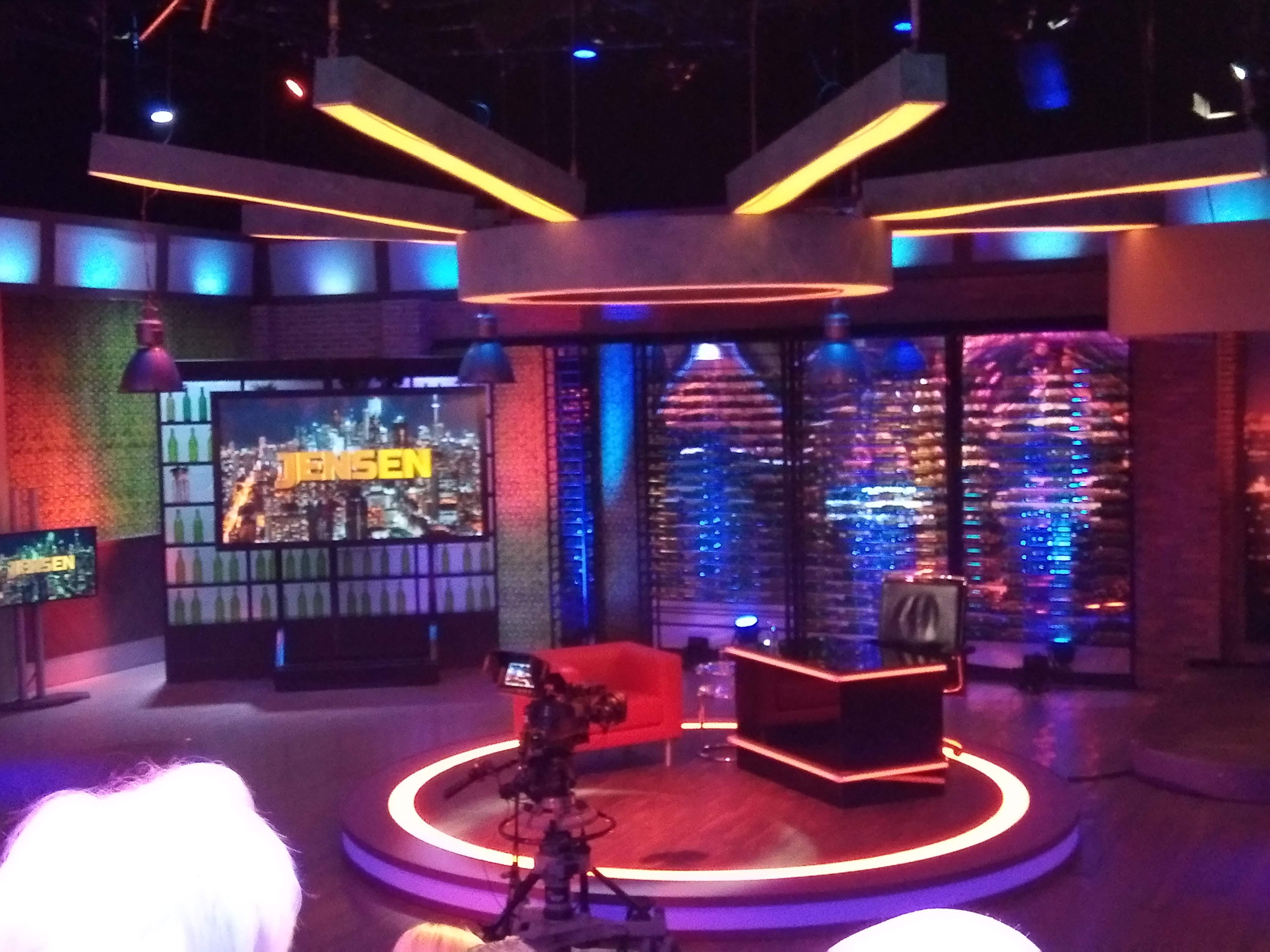
- The decor of Jensen! in 2018
- Genre: Late-night talk show; Variety show; Comedy
- Created by: Robert Jensen
- Presented by: Robert Jensen
- Country of origin: Netherlands
- Original language: Dutch
- No. of seasons: 16
- No. of episodes: 4,261

Production
- Executive producer: Robert Jensen
- Production location: Amsterdam
- Camera setup: Multi-camera
- Running time: 45 minutes (with commercials)

Original release
- Network: RTL 5
- Release: March 15, 2002 – November 9, 2018

Jensen! is a Dutch late-night talk show on the television station RTL 5. It aired on weekdays from 22:30 to 23:30 CET during winter, 20:30 to 21:30 UTC during summer.

The show's creator, anchorman Robert Jensen, also acted as its producer and host. In addition to various Dutch celebrities who accounted for the majority of the show's guests, Jensen often welcomed international celebrities who were interviewed in English with subtitles in Dutch.

On 29 March 2007, Jensen! became a subject of controversy in the United States as the show's guest that day, Snoop Dogg, delivered a few uncensored profanities directed at American television host Bill O'Reilly.

== International guests on Jensen! ==
- La Toya Jackson
- Shakira
- Antonio Banderas
- Pink
- Lionel Richie
- Simply Red
- Tommy Lee
- Uri Geller
- Buck Angel
- Bobby Farrell
- Alek Wek
- Naima Mora
- Nicole Linkletter
- Meat Loaf
- Live
- Lucie Silvas
- Jackass
- Sacha Baron Cohen as Borat
- Dana International
- Kim Wilde
- Kate Ryan
- Sugababes
- Jamie Oliver
- Gordon Ramsay
- Take That
- Level 42
- James Morrison
- Simon Webbe
- Westlife
- Gavin DeGraw
- Jack Wagner
- Melanie C
- Mika
- Stacy Ferguson
- Snoop Dogg
- Edgar Wright, Simon Pegg, Nick Frost
- Phil Collins
- Dirk Benedict and Dwight Schultz from The A-Team
- Philip Dewinter
- Cameron Diaz
- Gym Class Heroes
- Fab Morvan
- Kelly Rowland
- Wentworth Miller
- Dominic Purcell
- Emily Deschanel
- Jaslene Gonzalez
- Enrique Iglesias
- Sean Kingston
- Matt Damon
- Verne Troyer
- David Guetta & Tara McDonald
