= Evil Activities =

Dutch hardcore techno duo

Background information
- Origin: Netherlands
- Genres: Hardcore techno, gabber
- Years active: 1998–present
- Members: Kelly van Soest; Elvis de Oliveira
- Past members: Telly Luyks
- Website: evil-activities.nl

Evil Activities is a hardcore techno music DJ group formed in 1998 in the Netherlands. The two original members were Telly Luyks and Kelly van Soest, however it now only consists of Kelly van Soest. In 2016, E-Life joined Evil Activities.

Evil Activities released three music albums: Dedicated (2003), Evilution (2008), and Extreme Audio (2012); their notable works are Nobody Said It Was Easy, Evil Inside, and Broken. Kelly van Soest hosts an episodic live streamed DJ set named Extreme Audio.

Together with the MC E-Life, Evil Activities performs at music festivals such as Qlimax, Sensation Black, Dominator, Defqon.1, Masters of Hardcore, and Decibel.

== Albums ==
- Unitled, 1998
- Dedicated, 2003
- Evilution, 2008
- Extreme Audio, 2012
- Evil's Greatest Activities, 2013
