= Tom Rhodes =

American comedian and actor

- Born: January 14, 1967 (age 59); Washington D.C., U.S.
- Notable work: Mr. Rhodes; The Tonight Show with Jay Leno; Comedy Central Presents; Viva Vietnam: A White Trash Adventure Tour; Never Mind the Buzzcocks (US Version); Kevin Masters Show starring Tom Rhodes; American Drug War: The Last White Hope; Tom Rhodes Radio
- Spouse: Ashna Rodjan (2011–2018)

Comedy career
- Years active: 1984–present
- Medium: Stand-up, television
- Website: tomrhodes.net

Tom Rhodes (born January 14 1967) is an American comedian, actor, host, and travel writer.

When Comedy Central began in the early 1990s, Rhodes became the first comedian spokesperson they signed. Much of his commercial success came during this time. He was later the star of NBC's Mr. Rhodes, Dutch Yorin Television's Kevin Masters Show starring Tom Rhodes and Yorin Travel. In addition to venues in the United States, Rhodes has also performed in Hong Kong, Tokyo, Bangkok, Kuala Lumpur, Singapore, Beijing, Shanghai, Jakarta, Bali, London, Berlin, Munich, Zurich, Lausanne, Vancouver, Stockholm, Sydney, Melbourne, Basel, Geneva, Copenhagen, and Toronto.

His podcast Tom Rhodes Smart Camp (All Things Comedy) is a festival of ideas (Smart Bestie), knowledge, stories (Smart Ramble), books (Smart Books & Movies), and adventures. Co-hosted with Ashna Rodjan, the podcast often features conversations with comedians and individuals (Smart Talk) he meets while traveling.

He writes for the HuffPost Travel section and often documents his travels on his YouTube page. He has released seven comedy albums, the most recent being The Honkey Motherland in 2020, and two DVDs which feature his performances and interviews with locals across the world.

== Career ==
=== Stand-up comedy ===
Rhodes was introduced to stand-up at age 12 when his father took him to a local D.C. comedy club to see his Uncle Bob perform. Because Rhodes was wearing a Washington Redskins jacket, another comedian pulled him up onstage and interviewed him as if he were the Redskins football coach. He claims this was the moment he fell in love with stand-up comedy. He also idolized his favorite Uncle Bob, who influenced his sense of humor and the way he talked.

Rhodes had a chance meeting with Jay Leno at a jazz club called Cheek to Cheek in Winter Park, Florida. He was not old enough to get in the club at the time, so he waited by the backstage door for the opening act to walk out. When they did, he stuck his foot in the door and watched Leno's show through a crack in the curtain behind him. When the show was over, Leno discovered him and, impressed with his curiosity, took him backstage and let him ask questions about comedy and what it takes to be a comedian. Part of the advice Leno gave was that great comedians should be living in New York or Los Angeles to better seize performing opportunities on stage and TV. On his first appearance on The Tonight Show with Jay Leno, Rhodes reminded Leno about this meeting, which Leno recalled.

Rhodes took Leno's advice and moved to New York City. He spent, what he describes in interviews, as the worst year of his life living in Washington Heights "like a dog", with no money and very few comedy sets in the city. Instead, he was performing mostly one-nighters in New Jersey and Long Island. Eventually, he got a break when he was booked as a headliner at his first quality venue, The Punchline near Atlanta, Georgia.

Rhodes is featured in the 2010 book ¡Satiristas!: Comedians, Contrarians, Raconteurs & Vulgarians written by Paul Provenza, Host of Showtime's The Green Room with Paul Provenza, which features photos by San Francisco photographer Dan Dion. The book also includes interviews with George Carlin, Eddie Izzard, Trey Parker, and Matt Stone.

=== Comedy Central ===
After an appearance on Comedy Central's Two Drink Minimum, Rhodes was signed to a one-year development deal, the first stand-up to sign with the young station. He filmed several comedic rant commercials. These were shot in a jail cell and edited like a music video, a format popularized in the early 1990s with Denis Leary's MTV rants. Comic Marc Maron, a personal friend of Rhodes, hosted Short Attention Span Theater during this time. On an episode of his WTF with Marc Maron podcast he confessed that during their Comedy Central days, he was jealous of Rhodes' commercials. He said that after he complained "like a little bitch" to the network, he was able to get an image piece on the station just like him.

Rhodes said that his time on Comedy Central was a positive one. "They were just starting out [as a station]," he said. "They didn't have these signature shows like South Park, Politically Incorrect, and The Daily Show. It was really like being a junior filmmaker; I could do whatever I wanted! They loved me!" Rhodes explored this creative license when he hosted and wrote Viva Vietnam: A White Trash Adventure Tour. Viva Vietnam was a docu-comedy and his first television travel show. He chose Vietnam because the country had just opened up for tourism in the early 1990s and he had always been interested in Vietnam due to his father David, a decorated Vietnam war helicopter pilot veteran. He wanted to bring humor to something that was otherwise bleak in American history. Viva Vietnam aired in 1995 on the 20th Anniversary of the end of the Vietnam War. Rhodes explored the country, pulling stunts such as setting up a Slip N Slide on China Beach.

In addition to commercials and Viva Vietnam, Rhodes was often interviewed or featured in other Comedy Central shows, such as Comics Come Home, Politically Incorrect and The Daily Show. As a spokesman, he was utilized by the station for special segments or events. A few of these included going up in the Budweiser Blimp and interviewing players at Super Bowl XXVIII in Atlanta, Georgia; interviewing Shaquille O'Neal in the Dream Team II as they prepared for the 1994 FIBA World Championship and the 1996 Olympics; and a week on the H.O.R.D.E. festival, in a bus sponsored by Levi's Jeans and Comedy Central, along with Blues Traveler, Sheryl Crow, Joan Osborne, The Black Crowes, and Ziggy Marley. These segments usually aired during commercial breaks.

Rhodes shot two Comedy Central Presents, which aired in 2001 and 2009, respectively. Both specials were filmed at The Hudson Theatre in New York City. Featured comics are allowed to choose their own unique backgrounds for their episodes. For the first one, Rhodes chose Leonardo da Vinci's study overlooking Florence, Italy. For his second, Rhodes requested a background featuring the great monuments of the world, including Colossus of Rhodes (the inspiration for the title of his third CD), to be bunched together.

=== Television ===
Rhodes starred in NBC's Mr. Rhodes during the 1996-1997 fall lineup. It was his first primetime television show and lasted for 19 episodes, although 2 episodes were left unaired. It followed The Jeff Foxworthy Show at 8:30 p.m. on Monday nights. People Magazine gave the show an 'A−' in their "Picks & Pans" section, calling Rhodes a "gifted standup comic" and the show "a Welcome Back, Kotter for the gentry." Rhodes has gone on record saying his time on the show was only about six months of his life, but the effect it had on him was immense. The Orlando Sentinel reviewed his sitcom unfavorably, mostly critiquing his acting. During filming, Rhodes said that the constant jokes about his long hair and his inability to focus on stand-up, started to get to him. When the show ended, he used the money he earned to live comfortably in New York City again and concentrate on comedy. He called this his "NBC Artists Grant".

Rhodes had a relationship with Dutch actress Anniek Pheifer, and moved to the Netherlands with her. The relationship ended, but it jumpstarted his involvement in Dutch television. He hosted the talk show Kevin Masters Show starring Tom Rhodes. The show ran on Yorin for two years beginning in 2002. The producers of the show wanted an American to host the show and give his take on Dutch culture. The name Kevin Masters was a generic one to use until they found an actual host. His audition for the show featured his normal stand-up routine and was selected as the best by producers. Rhodes was akin to David Letterman in the Dutch late-night talk show world. In addition to Dutch celebrities, Rhodes interviewed American celebrities, as well. Since there is no censorship on Dutch television, Rhodes was able to smoke marijuana with Tenacious D at an Amsterdam coffee shop and Steve-O stapled his scrotum to his leg in full uncensored nudity. Rhodes lived in the Netherlands for five years.

In a fourth season episode of Insomniac with Dave Attell, Attell visited Amsterdam with the intention of experiencing the Seven Deadly Sins while there. As the host of Kevin Masters Show starring Tom Rhodes, Rhodes represented "Envy", since Attell was envious of his cushy job in such a liberal town.

When his talk show ended, Rhodes began hosting a travel show Yorin Travel on the Dutch television station Yorin. The format was fitting for Rhodes, who was starting to gain international appeal. It was also reminiscent of the travel show he did for Comedy Central in Vietnam. For a full season Rhodes filmed travel segments all over South America and Europe, including Peru, the Champagne Region of France, Saint Petersburg, Russia, Wales, the Dutch Caribbean, Aruba, Curacao, and a special Beatles tour in Liverpool, England.

Rhodes appeared on the premiere episode of Red Light Comedy - Live from Amsterdam hosted by Russell Peters. On the episode, Rhodes does regional material, such as calling the Belgium city Antwerp "Hand Throw City" and about marrying a Dutch woman.

=== Podcast ===
Tom Rhodes Smart Camp is a weekly comedy podcast. The show launched in March 2011 as an extension of the various travel projects he does while on the road. Rhodes has gone on record saying he would like to star in a comedy travel television show where he can document his personal travels and highlight comedy scenes around the world. Tom produced pilot episodes himself in 2010, filming in Montana and Kuala Lumpur, Malaysia. Since 2009, Rhodes' projects have all incorporated his love of traveling and filming in exotic locales, including a "Honeymoon World Tour" after he married Dutch photographer Ashna Rodjan in 2011. He and his wife filmed during this time, and documented his travels on his blog.

Most episodes have featured interviews with comics Tom knew in his early stand-up years, such as Doug Stanhope and Brian Regan. Stanhope is known for his comedic cynicism and called Tom a "very positive person" on the first episode of the show. Janeane Garofalo, also a cynical comic, was quoted in a documentary about Tom's career as saying that Rhodes' laid-back persona would normally "rub her the wrong way," but since Rhodes is upbeat both on and off stage, she enjoys him. Matador Network, a travel culture website, listed TRR as one of the top podcasts of 2011 due to its humor and diverse guests. Matador's only complaint was the sporadic release of the show, but cited the eclectic guests—comics, his uncle, promoters, and musicians like Tom Rhodes, an indie musician with the same name in North Carolina—as a strong draw. A special episode featured an interview with Tom's sister Laura shortly before she passed from breast cancer.

=== Travel blogs and DVDs ===
Rhodes travels with a toy Elvis doll and takes pictures of the doll in various places around the world. The pictures can be seen on his website. Some of the 80 pictures include Elvis at historical monuments and cities, such as the Lincoln Memorial in Washington DC; Mount Rushmore South Dakota; Valley of the Temples in Sicily, Italy; Big Ben in London, England; Pyramid El Castillo in Tulum, Mexico; Tokyo, Japan; the Grassy Knoll in Dallas, Texas; Times Square in New York City; The Great Wall of China in Beijing; Sydney Harbour in Sydney, Australia; the Berlin Wall in Germany; the Golden Gate Bridge in San Francisco; the Alamo in San Antonio, Texas; Machu Picchu in Peru; Thailand; Dubai, United Arab Emirates; Antwerp, Belgium; France; Aruba; Greece; and Argentina where he visited with family on his mother's side.

He became a travel writer for The Huffington Post in 2011, documenting his various travels.

== Personal life ==
Rhodes was born in Washington DC to Sara Rhodes (née McCollough), from Buenos Aires, Argentina, and David B. Rhodes III, an insurance salesman from Washington DC. On his podcast with his Uncle Bob, Rhodes explained that since his family is from DC, that they have "a certain amount of blackness to the way they speak" and that he takes a lot of pride in that. His family moved to Oviedo, Florida in January 1980. His parents divorced during his childhood.

Rhodes's father David was a decorated Vietnam war veteran. In 1968, he was selling insurance and driving a cab in D.C. when he enlisted in the army for U.S. Army Flight School. It was the last year he could qualify at age 29. David had three little boys and a wife to support at the time and never expected to serve. His logic was that peace talks had started in Vietnam that year and his flight training would take a year to complete. Instead, he ended up with one of the most dangerous jobs as a Huey helicopter pilot, flying supplies and troops into landing zones during combat. He earned a Purple Heart for his wounds and the Distinguished Flying Cross for his heroics before he returned home with a 50 percent disability. According to Rhodes, his father was a great influence on his sense of humor and had a way of spinning horrific war stories into something funny.

David B. "Dusty" Rhodes III died at age 70 on November 3, 2009, after suffering injuries sustained in a crash from a drunk driver. David Rhodes was bedridden for three months from his injuries of four broken ribs, a broken arm and leg, and pins placed in his vertebrae. He was buried in Arlington National Cemetery on November 30, 2009 with a full military funeral, an honor he received from his service in Vietnam and in the Air Force.

He had a younger sister named Laura Beth Rhodes Goldstein, who died from stage four breast cancer on April 20, 2011. He was very close to his sister. On Tom Rhodes Radio (recorded before she died) Laura told Rhodes that he was the closest thing she had to an actual sister due to the helpful advice he gave her about life and dating. Since Tom's sister always wanted him to get married, he married Ashna Rodjan at his sister's bedside the day before she died. He said that though she was very sick, Laura was able to clap and say "Congratulations." In December 2018, he announced on his podcast that Ashna was divorcing him. The pair recorded a podcast on Dec. 30, 2018, titled, "Our Last Day Together" discussing their divorce and desire to remain great friends who love each other.

== Material ==
Rhodes paces around the stage and holds his microphone in a loose, wobbly way. It's a relaxed style he once called "a temple dance to honor the spirits of the universe." His pacing grew from a combination of things. First, he likens his moves to that of a boxer (he boxed at age 13 and often does jokes about it). Second, he is a fan of tennis player John McEnroe who advises to "Play the net," which he says he applies to the stage, and third, he received some advice from a comic when he was just starting out: "[He] gave me some advice... He said, 'Sh*t in all four corners of the stage.' Simple, but what it means is that you should cover all areas of your stage, and ever since that I’ve always made sure in every show I...sh*t in all four corners of the stage," said Rhodes. Rhodes recognizes that some people have called this style annoying but that it is not something he can control anymore.

He is involved with Sacred Cow Productions, the Bill Hicks-founded production company, and appeared in the Kevin Booth documentary American Drug War: The Last White Hope speaking about the drug laws in Amsterdam. Rhodes was influenced by Hicks, whom he met when he was an open mic comic and said "He was just a nice guy that loved comedy and comedians." He released two albums with Stand Up! Records: Hot Sweet Ass and Live in Paris.

== Television and film ==
- Viva Vietnam: A White Trash Adventure Tour (Comedy Central)
- Mr. Rhodes (NBC)
- Comedy Central Presents (Comedy Central)
- Kevin Masters Show starring Tom Rhodes (Yorin Dutch Television)
- Yorin Travel (Yorin Dutch Television)
- 4:20 Hour Stand-Up (Salient Media)
- Stand Up Australia (The Comedy Channel in Australia)

== Discography ==
- Hot Sweet Ass (2005)
- Live in Paris (2006)
- Colossus of Me (2012)
- All Hail Laughter (2017)
- Clean 18 (2018)
- Around The World (2019)
- The Honkey Motherland (2020)
