= Practical idealism =

Political philosophy term

Practical idealism is a term first used by John Dewey in 1917 and subsequently adopted by Mahatma Gandhi. It describes a philosophy that holds it to be an ethical imperative to implement ideals of virtue or good. It further holds it to be equally immoral to either refuse to make the compromises necessary to realize high ideals, or to discard ideals in the name of expediency. Practical idealism in its broadest sense may be compared to utilitarianism in its emphasis on outcomes, and to political economy and enlightened self-interest in its emphasis on the alignment of what is right with what is possible.

== International affairs ==
In foreign policy and international relations, the phrase "practical idealism" has come to be taken as a theory or set of principles that diplomats or politicians use to describe or publicize their outlook on foreign policy. It purports to be a pragmatic compromise between realism, which stresses the promotion of a state's "narrow" and amoral self-interest, and idealism, which aims to use the state's influence and power to promote higher liberal ideals such as peace, justice, and co-operation between nations. In this view, realism is seen as a prescription for Machiavellian selfishness and ruthlessness in international relations. Machiavelli recommended political strategies for reigning, or potential, princes; the infamous teachings gravitate around his vision of the overarching and ultimate goal of any prince, remaining in power. These strategies range from those that, today, might be called moderate or liberal political advice to those that, today, might be called illegal, immoral or unconstitutional. Machiavelli is by name, like novelist George Orwell, modernly associated with manipulative acts and philosophies that disregard civil rights and basic human dignity in favor of deception, intimidation, and coercion. This extreme form of realism is sometimes considered both unbecoming of nations' aspirations and, ultimately, morally and spiritually unsatisfying for their individual people. Extreme idealism, on the other hand, is associated with moralist naiveté and the failure to prioritize the interests of one's state above other goals.

More recently, practical idealism has been advocated by United States Secretary of State Condoleezza Rice and Philip D. Zelikow, in the position of counselor to the department. The latter has defended the foreign policy of the George W. Bush administration as being "motivated in good part by ideals that transcend narrow conceptions of material self-interest." Zelikow also assesses former U.S. presidents Theodore Roosevelt and Franklin Roosevelt as practitioners of practical idealism.

SECRETARY RICE: Well, American foreign policy has always had, and I think rightfully had, a streak of idealism, which means that we care about values, we care about principle. It's not just getting to whatever solution is available, but it's doing that within the context of principles and values. And at a time like this, when the world is changing very rapidly and when we have the kind of existential challenge that we have with terrorism and extremism, it's especially important to lead from values. And I don't think we've had a president in recent memory who has been so able to keep his policies centered in values.

The responsibility, then, of all of us is to take policies that are rooted in those values and make them work on a day-to-day basis so that you're always moving forward toward a goal, because nobody believes that the kinds of monumental changes that are going on in the world or that we are indeed seeking are going to happen in a week's time frame or a month's time frame or maybe even a year's time frame. So it's the connection, the day-to-day operational policy connection between those ideals and policy outcomes. - Condoleezza Rice, Washington Post interview

Singaporean diplomat and former ambassador to the United Nations Dr. Tommy Koh quoted UN Secretary-General U Thant when he described himself as a practical idealist:

If I am neither a Realist nor a Moralist, what am I? If I have to stick a label on myself, I would quote U Thant and call myself a practical Idealist. I believe that as a Singaporean diplomat, my primary purpose is to protect the independence, sovereignty, territorial integrity and economic well-being of the state of Singapore. I believe that I ought to pursue these objectives by means which are lawful and moral. On the rare occasions when the pursuit of my country's vital national interest compels me to do things which are legally or morally dubious, I ought to have a bad conscience and be aware of the damage which I have done to the principle I have violated and to the reputation of my country. I believe that I must always consider the interests of other states and have a decent regard for the opinion of others. I believe that it is in Singapore's long-term interest to strengthen international law and morality, the international system for curbing the use of force and the institutions for the pacific settlement of disputes. Finally, I believe that it is in the interests of all nations to strengthen international co-operation and to make the world's political and economic order more stable, effective and equitable. — "Can Any Country Afford a Moral Foreign Policy?"

Critics have questioned whether practical idealism is merely a slogan with no substantive policy implications. (Gude 2005)

== U.S. presidential politics ==
The phrase practical idealism also was used as a slogan by John Kusumi who ran as an independent candidate in the 1984 presidential elections. This was the first introduction of the phrase in U.S. presidential politics. (United Press International 1984) (New Haven Journal Courier 1984) (New Haven Register 1984)

Former Democratic Vice President Al Gore also used the phrase in the 1990s, as did Republican Secretary of State Condoleezza Rice in the 2000s.

American political scientist Jack Godwin elaborates on the doctrine of practical idealism in The Arrow and the Olive Branch: Practical Idealism in US Foreign Policy.
