= Floortje Dessing =

Dutch presenter

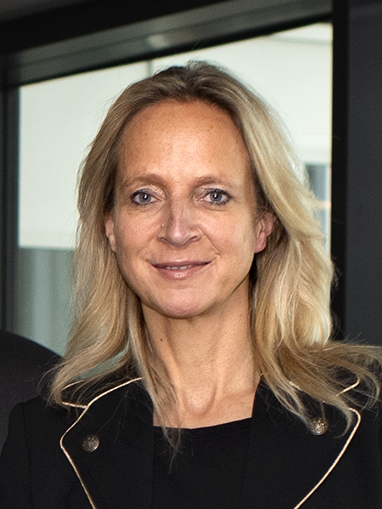
- Dessing in 2019
- Born: 31 August 1970 (age 56); Heemstede, Netherlands
- Education: Hogeschool Diemen; Hogeschool voor de Kunsten Utrecht
- Occupations: Presenter, tv producer, interpreter
- Years active: 1995–present
- Television: Yorin Travel; 3 op Reis; Floortje naar het einde van de wereld

Floortje Dessing (born 31 August 1970 in Heemstede) is a Dutch radio and television presenter, producer and travel writer, best known for her various travel TV shows. She graduated from the Utrecht School of the Arts.

Since 1995 Dessing has covered more than 120 countries in TV programs, that were mostly made by her own production company, such as Arrivals, Yorin Travel, RTL Travel, 3 op Reis and Floortje naar het einde van de wereld, for several Dutch TV broadcasters.

Her brother Johan Dessing is member of the Dutch senate for the FvD party.

== North Korea ==
In 2011 Dessing and her crew traveled through North Korea, being only the second crew in history to be allowed to film a travel TV-show in that country. She has also written several travel guides.

== Fair trade and the environment ==
Dessing is a vegetarian and has two boutiques, which sell clothing that is fair trade and has been produced in an environment-friendly way.

Since 2009 Dessing has been a supporter of the Greenpeace climate campaign 'You Turn the Earth.' She has made a point of traveling in more environmentally friendly ways, for example by using public transport more frequently than before. Dessing uses her travels to raise awareness about the earth's vulnerability, and to stress the importance of taking good care of it.

Dessing is also active as an ambassador to the International Red Cross and to the Dutch Max Havelaar foundation for fair trade.
