= RTL Travel =

Dutch television series

- Starring: Tom Rhodes
- Country of origin: Netherlands
- Original language: English

Production
- Production location: various
- Running time: 60 mins

Original release
- Network: Yorin (season 1); RTL 4 (subsequent seasons)
- Release: 2004

RTL Travel (formerly known as Yorin Travel) is a travel television series which first aired on the Dutch Yorin television station with host Tom Rhodes, and later became a part of the RTL Nederland network.

As Yorin Travel in its first season, Floortje Dessing was its presenter.

In 2006 it presented a new Hotlist format where each presenter's ten favorite locations was shown.
