= Rolf Wouters =

Dutch television presenter (born 1963)

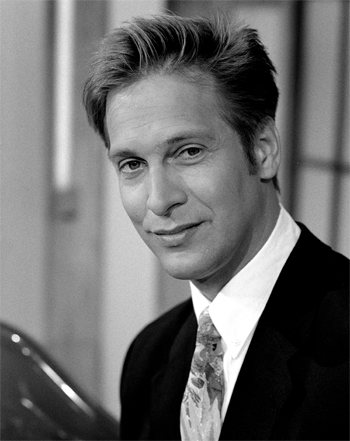
- Wouters in the 1990s
- Born: Rolf Xavier Wouters; 23 April 1963 (age 63); Rijswijk, Netherlands
- Occupation: TV presenter

Rolf Wouters (born 23 April 1963) is a Dutch television presenter. Before his career as a television presenter, Wouters worked in advertising man and was actor in the film Flodder. Wouters has not been active on TV since 2005 and has lived in Portugal since then where he works as a farmer. On 1 November 2014 Wouters was featured in the anniversary program 25 Jaar RTL: Ik Hou Van RTL. On 27 January 2020 it was announced that Rolf Wouters is making a return to Dutch television after 14 years. From 2020 he presents for SBS6 the program Split Screen.

== Career ==
=== Breakthrough and RTL 4 ===
He made his public debut in 1988 in the program Showmasters (a talent show quiz of the NCRV). He was jokingly given up for the program by colleagues. He won the first episode and stood out to Joop van den Ende. He saw a great talent in Wouters. Van den Ende offered Wouters the small program Bulldozer, which was broadcast on RTL 4. Wouters became known to the general public when he presented Love at first sight. First he did that together with Caroline Tensen and later alone. After this, his career went fast. In 1993 he was allowed to take over from Jos Brink for Wedden dat..?, which he presented for two seasons at RTL 4. In the same year Rolf also started the program Now or Never. From Now or Never, Wouters was assisted in many of his programs by Meneer Sjon, a small obliging assistant with a high voice.

=== Veronica ===
In 1995, Wouters switched from RTL 4 to Veronica, which had also become part of HMG. Here he presented the entertainment show for four seasons Don't Forget Your Toothbrush. That program also proved popular. At Veronica, Wouters also came up with new program formats, including Orde Orde (1996), Who's Talking (1996) and Wouters Wondere Woensdag (1997). In the spring of 1997 he presented one more season of Betting that..? at Veronica. In February and March, as it turned out, the final season of Now or Never aired.

In September 1998, Wouters came up with a new program Hot Shots. Two episodes had already been recorded. The first episode was broadcast on Veronica, but the channel was not satisfied with the result. Veronica had a different program in mind in terms of content and wanted Wouters to come back to adjust the program, and to re-record the second episode. Wouters could not agree with the program format as Veronica envisioned and refused to do the recordings again. This led to a conflict between Wouters and Joop van den Ende. Wouters was replaced in the program by Gijs Staverman. Wouters signed a new contract for three years with Veronica/HMG in October of that year and left the permanent stable of Joop van den Ende. At the beginning of 1999 Wouters again made the Toothbrush Show under the production of Van den Ende. Rolf Wouters had announced in advance that this would be the last season of this program; Wouters wanted to make new programs.

At the end of 1999 he presented the first series of Big Brother together with Daphne Deckers. In June 1999 Wouters started his own production company, RedForest TV. In January 2000 he came with his production company with the first entertainment show, Televisione di Rolfo. This program was inspired by the great Italian TV shows. Wouters received popular Italian guests. The program was not a success. In May 2000, the interactive game The Hunt was broadcast via the Internet. This game proved popular and a second series was made in January 2001. This was also broadcast by Veronica on TV. In the spring of 2001 Wouters returned to TV after a year's absence with Rolfs Discotrain, an entertainment show. The television studio was transformed into a large disco, of which Wouters was the owner. Although the program was not a ratings cannon, Veronica (Yorin) was satisfied with it. They wanted to keep Wouters and the program, but Wouters had other plans.

=== AVRO ===
In June 2001 it was announced that Rolf Wouters made the switch to public broadcasting. Wouters had signed a three-year contract with the AVRO. On 1 September 2001, Redforest became part of IdtV / Chrysalis. Wouters became a board member of the new IdtV and helped to transform the company. The new logo was his. In August/September 2001 he produced the third series of The Hunt. This series was broadcast on Yorin. At the AVRO, however, Wouters remained out of the picture for a long time. It was not until the summer of 2002 that Wouters was allowed to present his first program, called Rolf's Answering Machine and then De Factor Rolf. In the autumn he presented the gala of the Golden Televizier-Ringonce. At the beginning of 2003 he came up with a second season of Rolf's Answering Machine, but the ratings were much lower than those of the first series. The Royal Rolf programme flopped miserably. This was broadcast in the spring of 2003. The AVRO quickly moved the program from primetime in the evening to the Saturday early evening. In the summer of that year it was announced that Wouters and the AVRO were ending their collaboration. Wouters then left IdtV. The reason why he left the company remained unknown. It remained quiet around Wouters after that.

=== Talpa ===
In 2005, John de Mol announced that Rolf Wouters would be one of the presenters of his new TV channel Talpa. Wouters presented the program Sponsor Loterij Superbal from September to December of that year, the program did not return in 2006, just like Wouters. In 2006 it seemed that Talpa wanted to make a fourth series of The Hunt, but this never happened.

=== 25 Years RTL: I Love RTL ===
On 1 November 2014 Rolf Wouters was seen on television for the first time in years, he appeared in the anniversary program 25 Jaar RTL: Ik Hou Van RTL. Around the same time Wouters gave an interview to the Volkskrant in which he told where he had stayed after his departure from television. In a radio interview on 3FM, Wouters said that he misses making television.

=== SBS6 ===
On 27 January 2020 it was announced that the presenter would return to Dutch television at SBS6 after a 14-year absence. For that channel Wouters presents the program Split Screen - a game show in which candidates have to guess a number within two units.

== Filmography ==
=== Movie ===
- Flodder, (1986)

=== Television programmes ===
- Wetten, dass..?, RTL 4 (1993, 1994, 1997)
- Uhhh... Vergeet je tandenborstel niet!, Veronica (1995, 1996, 1998, 1999)
- Big Brother, Veronica (1999)
