= Jonkman =

Jonkman is a Dutch surname meaning "young man" (modern Dutch jongeman) or "bachelor" (archaic Dutch jongman). People with the surname include:

- Bartel J. Jonkman (1884–1955), American (Michigan) politician
- Geert-Jan Jonkman (born 1984), Dutch track racing cyclist
- Harmen Jonkman (born 1975), Dutch chess player
- Jan Anne Jonkman (1891–1976), Dutch politician, Minister of Colonial Affairs 1946–48
- Janneke Jonkman (born 1978), Dutch writer
- Marjan Jonkman (born 1994), Dutch fashion model
- Mark Jonkman (born 1986), Dutch cricketer, twin brother of Maurits
- Maurits Jonkman (born 1986), Dutch cricketer, twin brother of Mark
