= Gerard Laman =

Dutch mathematician

Gerard Laman (August 22, 1924 – September 22, 2009) was a Dutch mathematician who worked on graph theory.

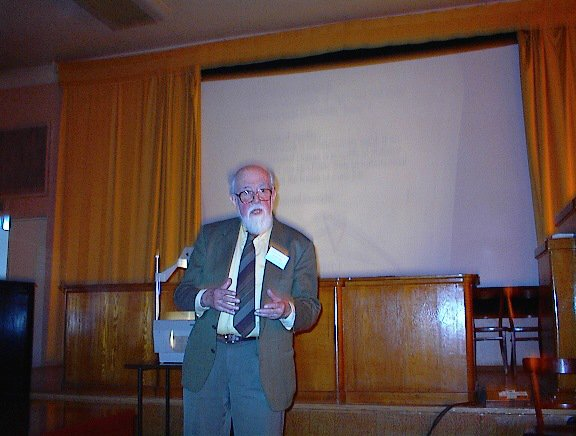
Gerard Laman.

== Early life ==
He completed high school studies at the Stedelijk Gymnasium Leiden in 1942. His study of mathematics at Leiden University was delayed by a period in hiding to evade enforced labor during the Nazi occupation of the Netherlands. He completed a degree in mathematics with a minor in mechanics in 1952. From 1949 onwards, he was a scientific assistant to J. Haantjes.

He received private instruction in the combinatorial topology of fiber spaces in Brussels from G. Hirsch of the University of Ghent in 1953. During this period he received a stipend from the Dutch-Belgian Cultural Accord.

From 1954 to 1957 he taught mathematics at the Delft high school 'Gemeentelijke Hogere Burgerschool HBS'.

In 1959 he completed his PhD thesis at Leiden University. W. T. van Est acted as his supervisor, after his first supervisor J. Haantjes passed away.

=== Career ===
From 1957 to 1967 he worked as a lecturer at the 'Technische Hogeschool' of Eindhoven (now Eindhoven University of Technology).

From 1967 to his retirement in 1989, he worked as a lecturer at the Mathematical Institute of the University of Amsterdam, teaching discrete mathematics and mathematics for students in econometrics. Laman regarded himself mostly as a teacher.

Laman is often credited with proving, in 1970, that a particular family of sparse graphs, since named Laman graphs, are precisely those that are minimally generically rigid in the plane. This result, the Geiringer–Laman theorem, had already been proven by Hilda Geiringer in 1927.

Laman's original publication in 1970 went largely unnoticed at first. Only when Branko Grünbaum and Geoffrey Colin Shephard wrote about Laman's paper in their lectures on lost mathematics did this work receive more attention.

Towards the end of his life, Laman worked to lift the original 'Laman graph' from its original two dimensions to three, inspired by a simple counterexample, the 'double banana graph'.
