= Stedelijk Gymnasium Leiden =

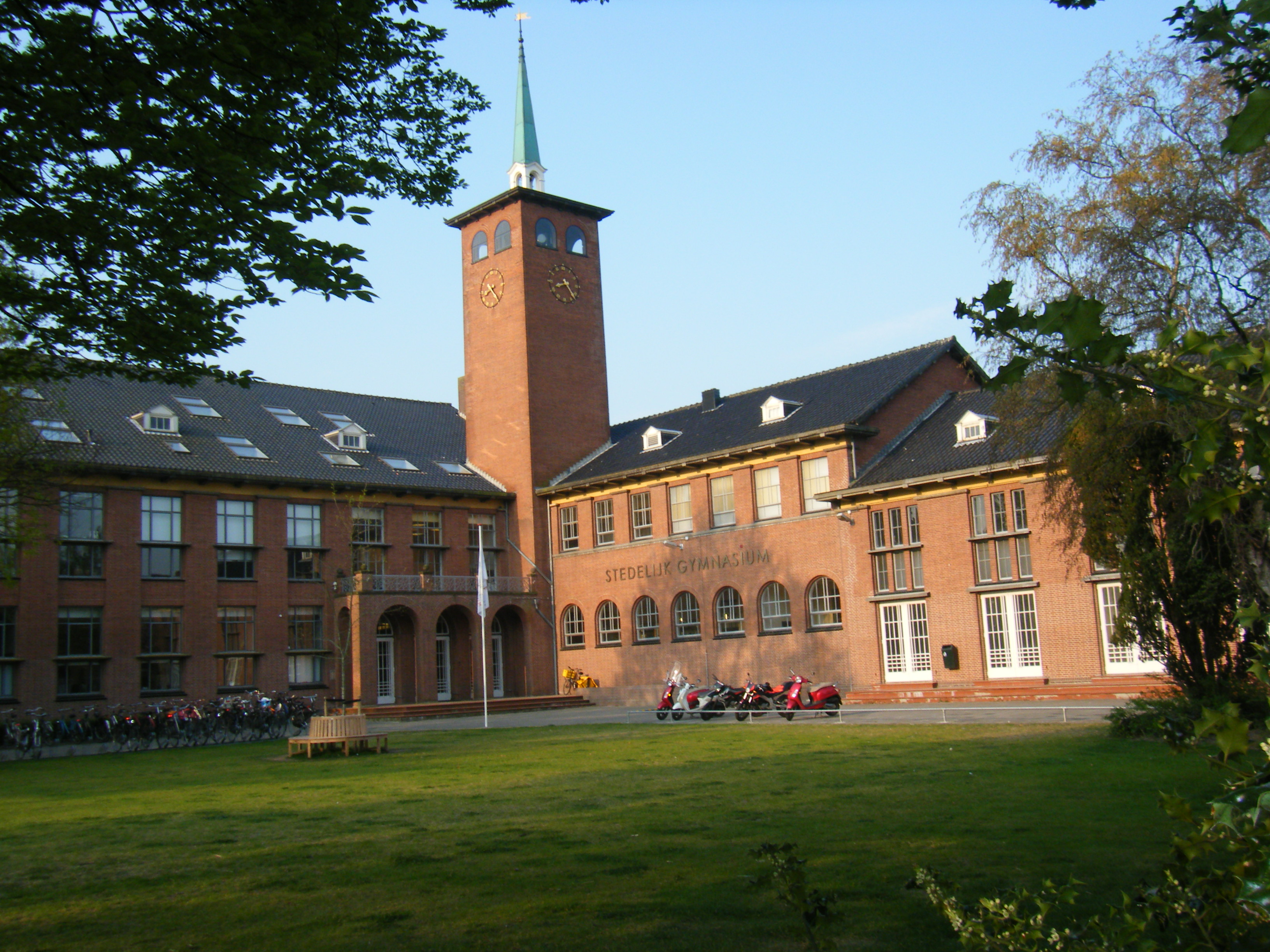
- Stedelijk Gymnasium Leiden (Fruinlaan)

Location
- Fruinlaan 15; Leiden, Netherlands; Leiden, South Holland 2313 EP; Netherlands
- Coordinates: 52.15308°N 4.50594°E

Information
- Type: Gymnasium
- Motto: Uno Sumus Animo
- Established: c. 1323; 703 years ago
- Staff: 160
- Enrollment: 1,800 (Jan. 2014)
- Rector: Bart Vieveen
- Website: http://gymnasiumleiden.nl/

The Stedelijk Gymnasium Leiden is a gymnasium in Leiden, Netherlands. It is one of the oldest schools in the country; its history dates back to the Middle Ages. The Stedelijk Gymnasium Leiden is the largest gymnasium-only school in the Netherlands, with over 1,800 pupils (in 2014).

== History ==
The school is named in a charter of count William III of Holland in 1323 under the name schole or scoele, and is probably founded in the second half of the 13th century. After the Siege of Leiden (1573–1574) Nicholaus Stochius was named rector. Around 1700 the school was named gymnasium in official Latin documents (in Dutch: Latijnse school). The name Stedelijk ('municipal') Gymnasium was introduced in 1838, together with a new educational approach.

== Buildings ==
- 1324 (?)–1883: Lokhorststraat in the centre of Leiden (architect Lieven de Key)
- 1883–1938: Doezastraat
- 1938–present: Fruinlaan (named after professor Robert Fruin, who taught at the school)
- 2001–2010: extra building at Noordeinde
- 2010–present: second building Gooimeerlaan ("location Socrates")
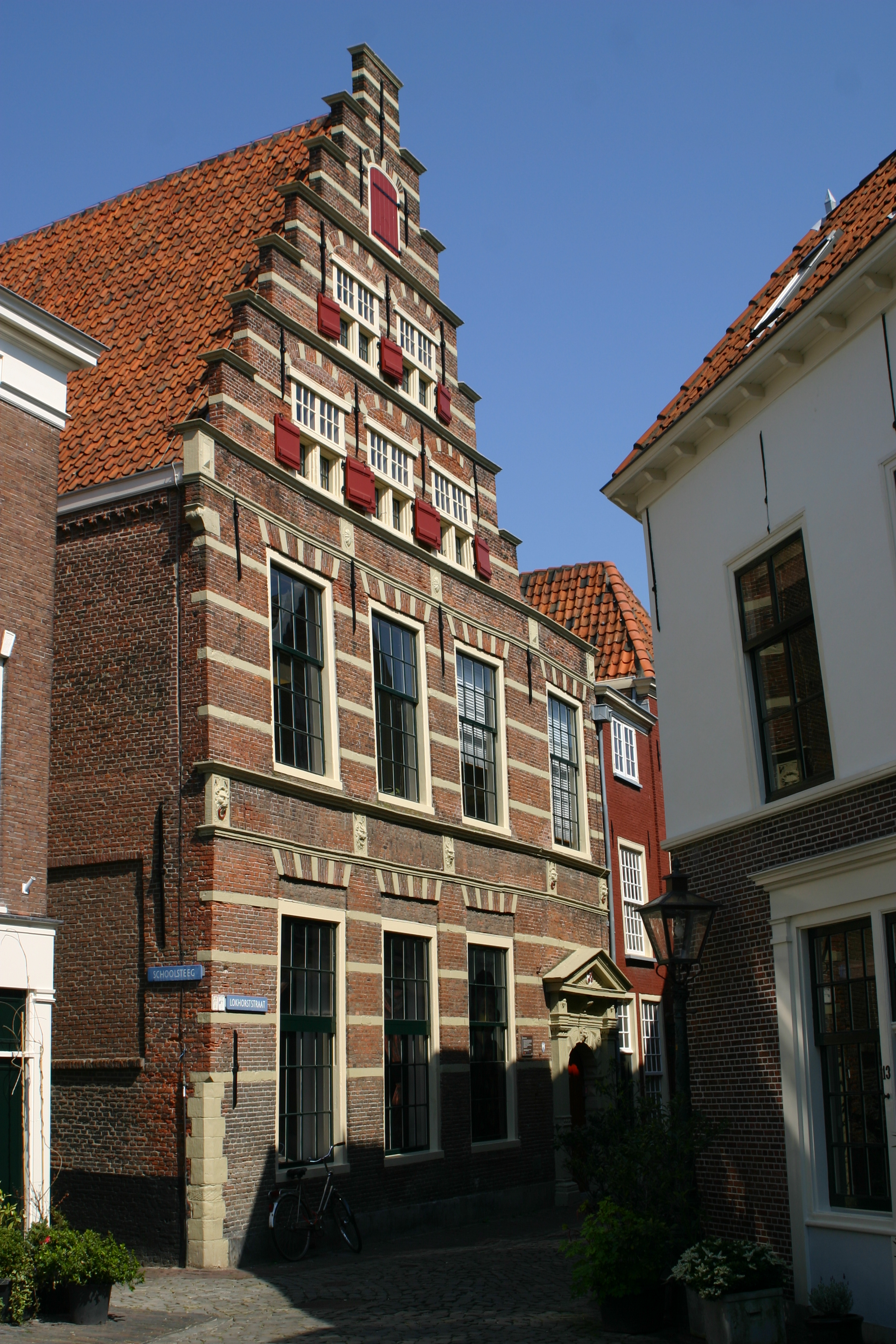
School building 1324 (?)-1883 (Lokhorststraat Leiden)

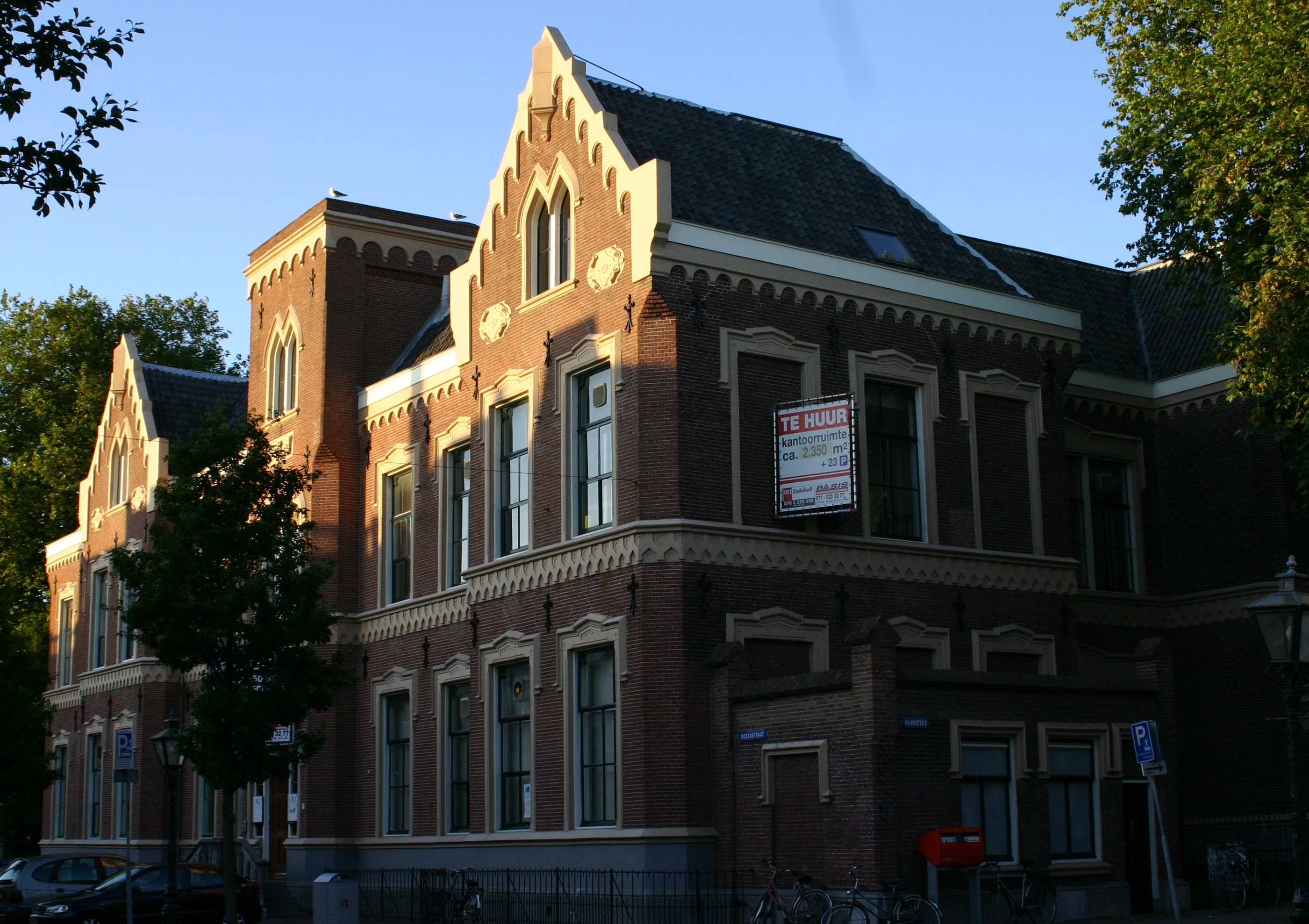
School building 1883-1938 (Doezastraat 2a Leiden)

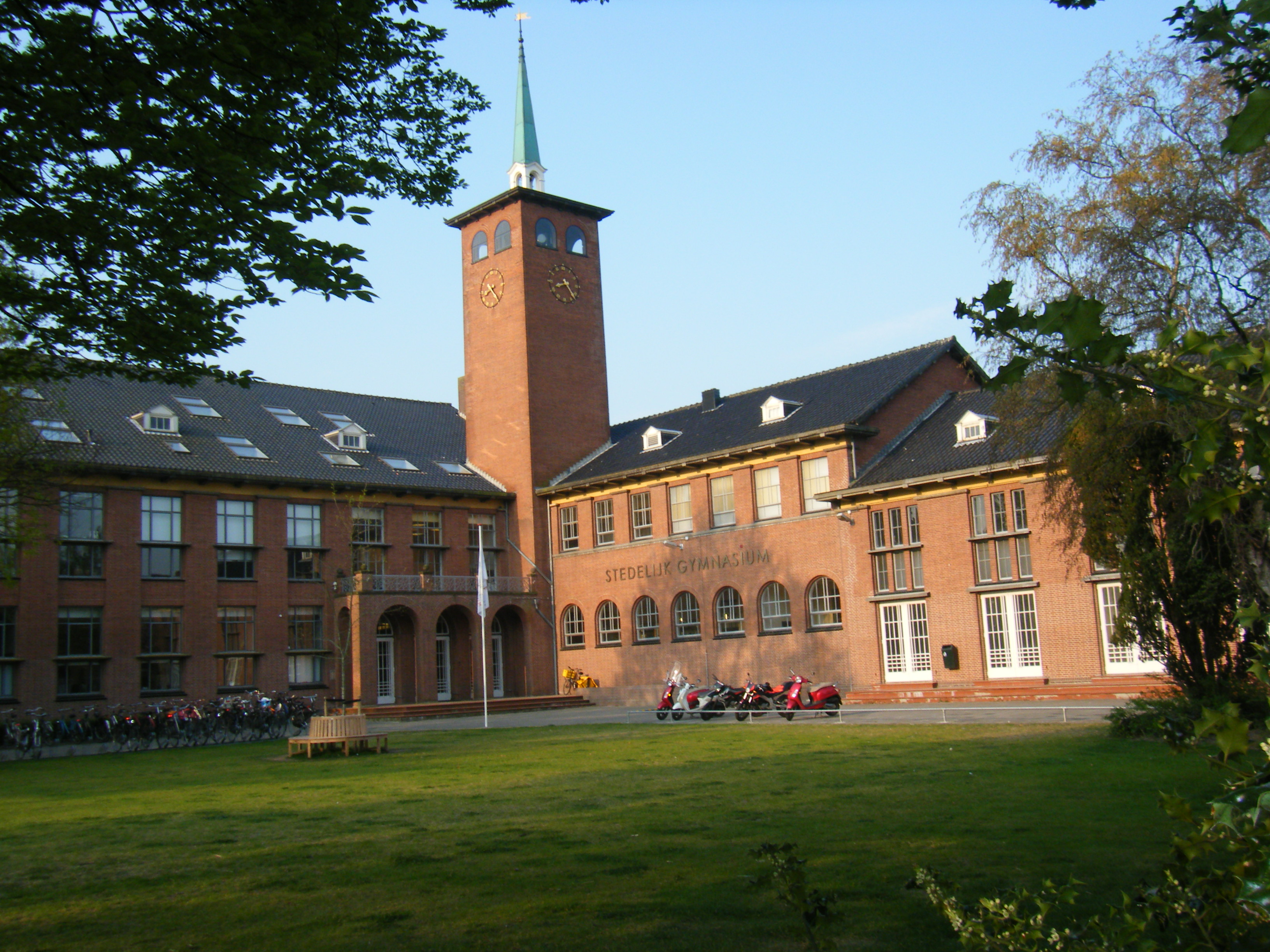
School building 1938-now (Fruinlaan 15, Leiden)

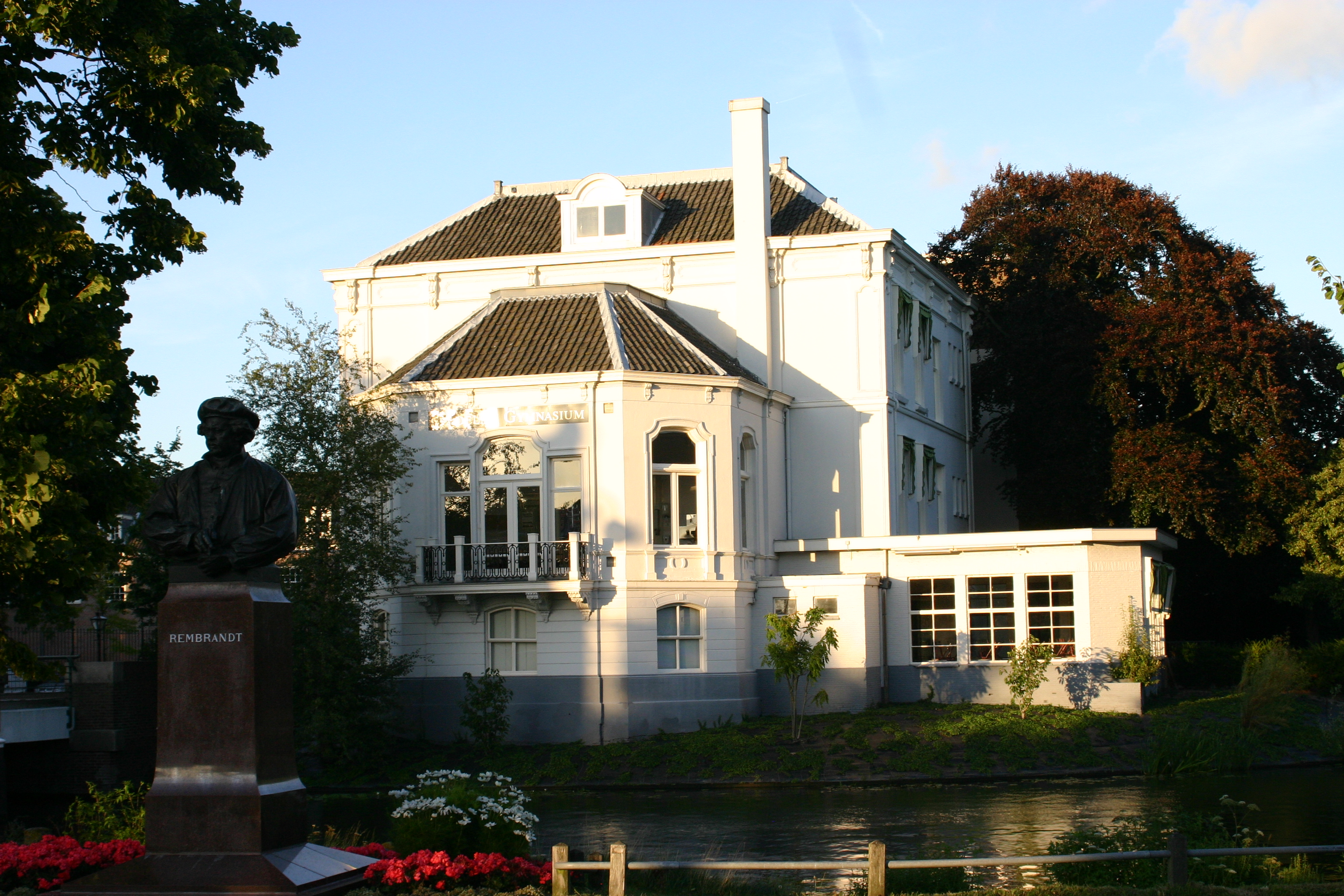
Extra school building 2001-2010 (Noordeinde 1, Leiden)

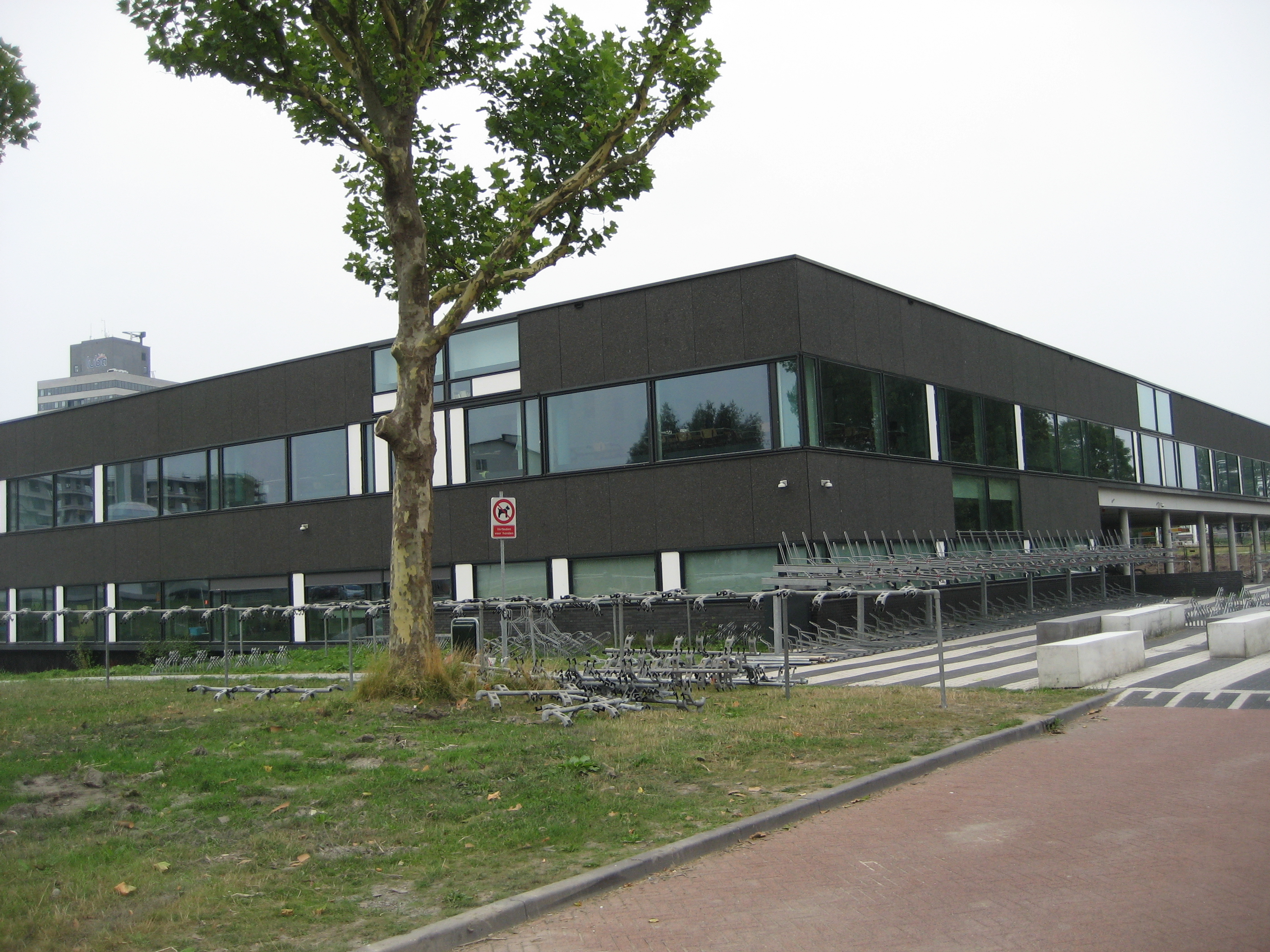
Building "Socrates"

== LEMUN and international contacts ==
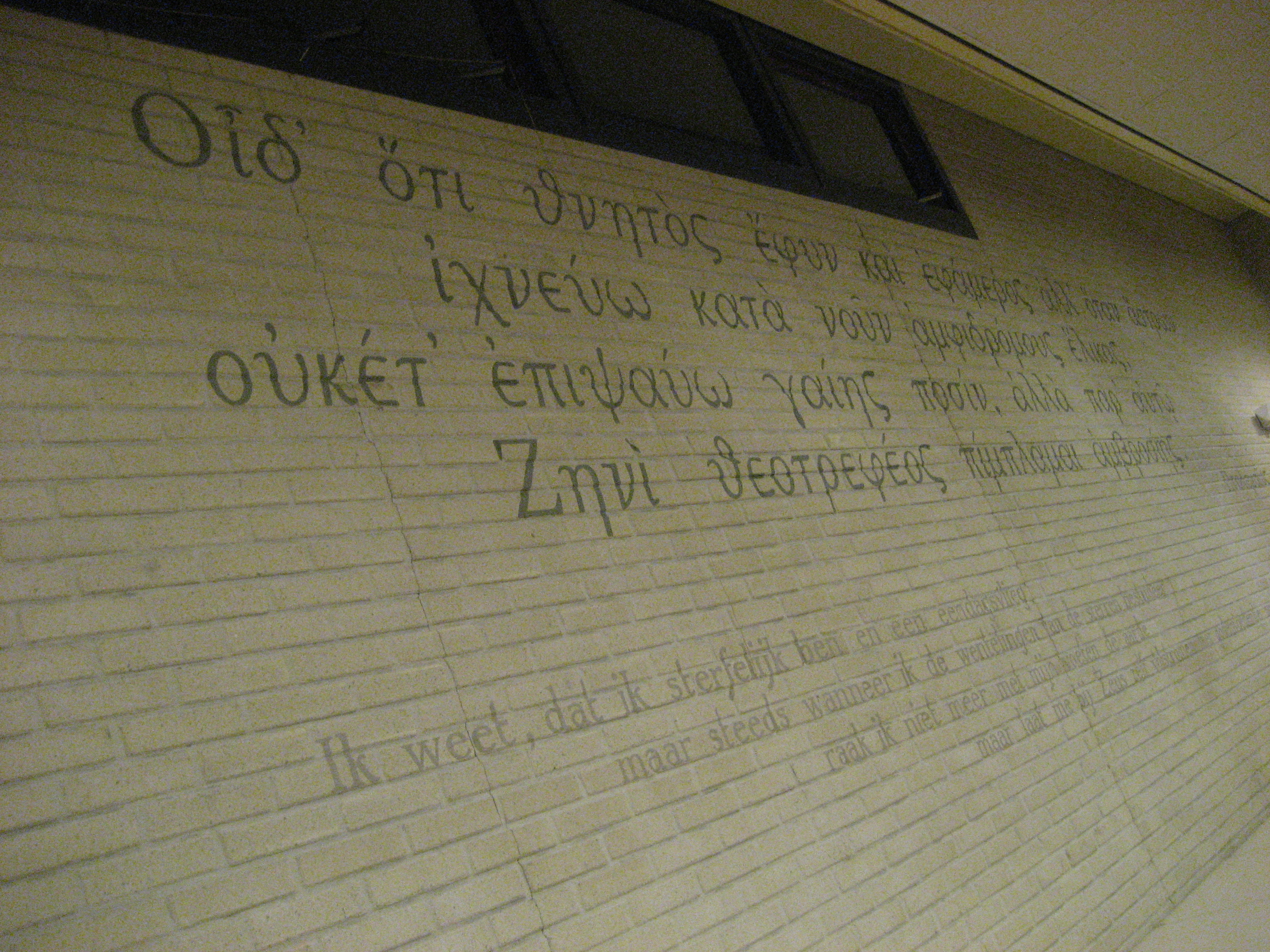
Epigram by Ptolemy in the school

Since 2001 Stedelijk Gymnasium organizes the Leiden Model United Nations (LEMUN), which is part of the international Model United Nations (MUN)-conferences. The Stedelijk Gymnasium has contacts with schools from Sweden, Poland, Hungary, Germany, Italy and Belgium to exchange students.

== Alumni ==
- Iefke van Belkum, waterpolo player
- Biurakn Hakhverdian, waterpolo player
- Stef Blok, politician VVD
- Herman Boerhaave, botanist
- Eduard Bomhoff, economist, politician LPF
- Armin van Buuren, disc jockey
- Rudolf van Eecke, entomologist
- Tatjana Ehrenfest, mathematician
- Rudolf Escher, composer
- Erik Falkenburg, football player Willem II
- Gerrit Jan van Heuven Goedhart, High Commissioner for Refugees
- Jan Willem de Jong, indologist
- Janneke Jonkman, writer
- Matthijs Huizing, politician VVD
- Patrick de Josselin de Jong, professor cultural anthropology
- Benk Korthals, politician VVD, former Minister of Justice
- Aad Kosto, politician Partij van de Arbeid
- Gerard Laman, mathematician
- Marjolijn Molenaar, international cricketer
- Frits van Oostrom, professor medieval literature, former president KNAW
- Laurine van Riessen, speed skater
- Rembrandt van Rijn, painter
- Max van der Stoel, politician Partij van de Arbeid, former Minister of Foreign Affairs, former High Commissioner OCSE
- Albertus Willem Sijthoff, publisher
- Reinier Zonneveld, disc jockey

Teachers

- Ria Beckers
- Petrus Johannes Blok
- Pieter Helbert Damsté
- Robert Fruin, teacher geography and history
- Abraham Kuenen
- Jean Abraham Chrétien Oudemans
- Gilles Quispel
- Cornelis Schrevel
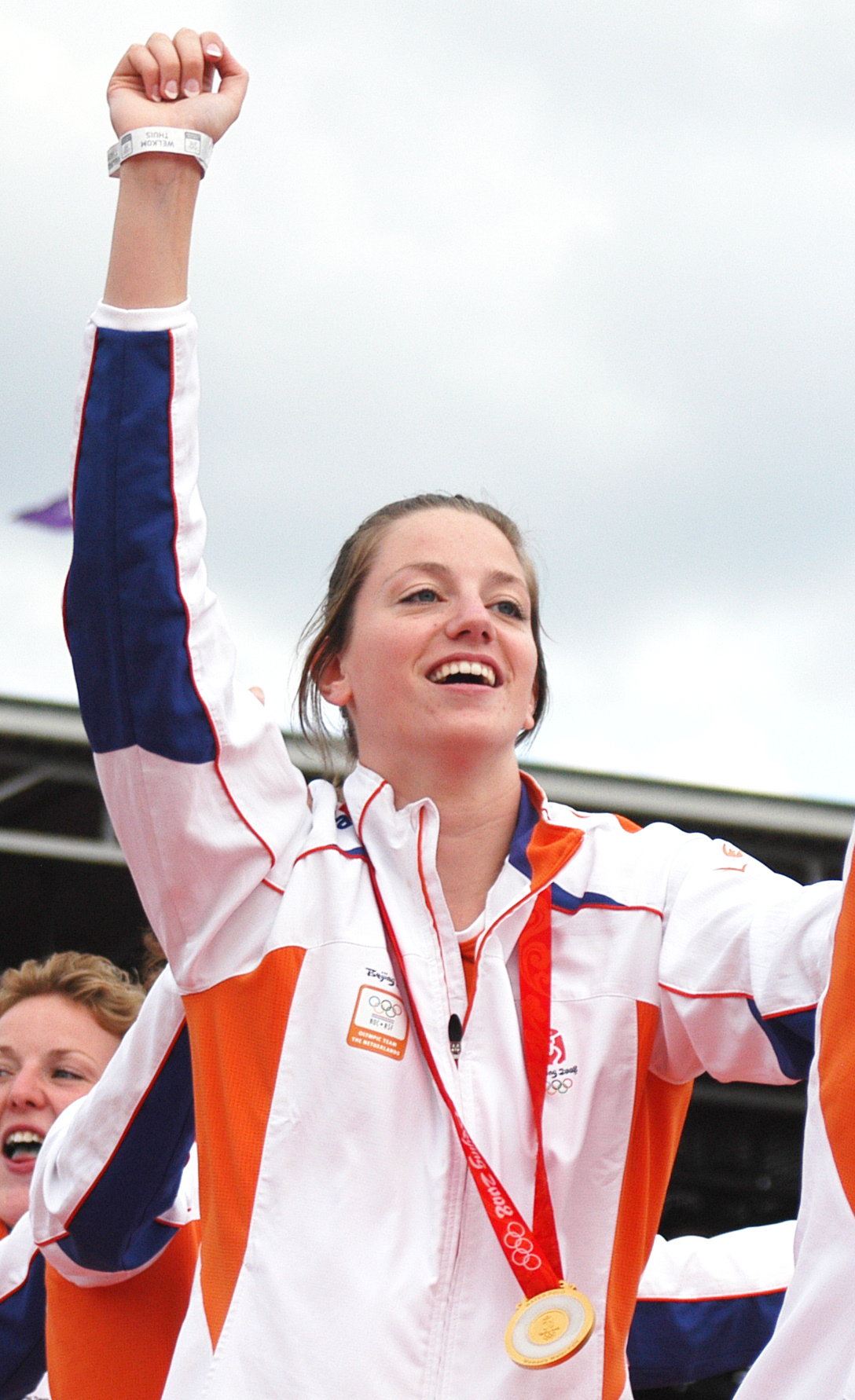
Iefke van Belkum

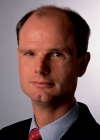
Stef Blok

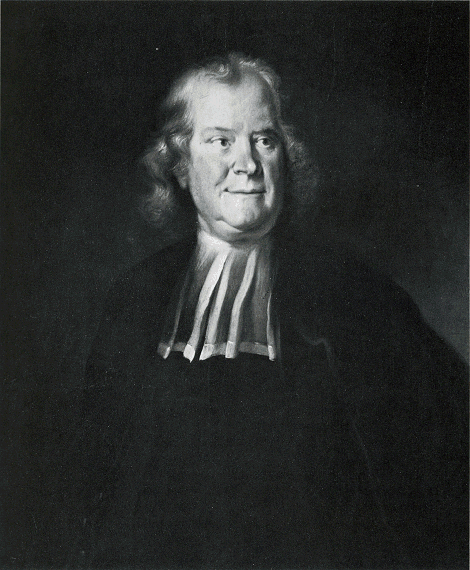
Herman Boerhaave

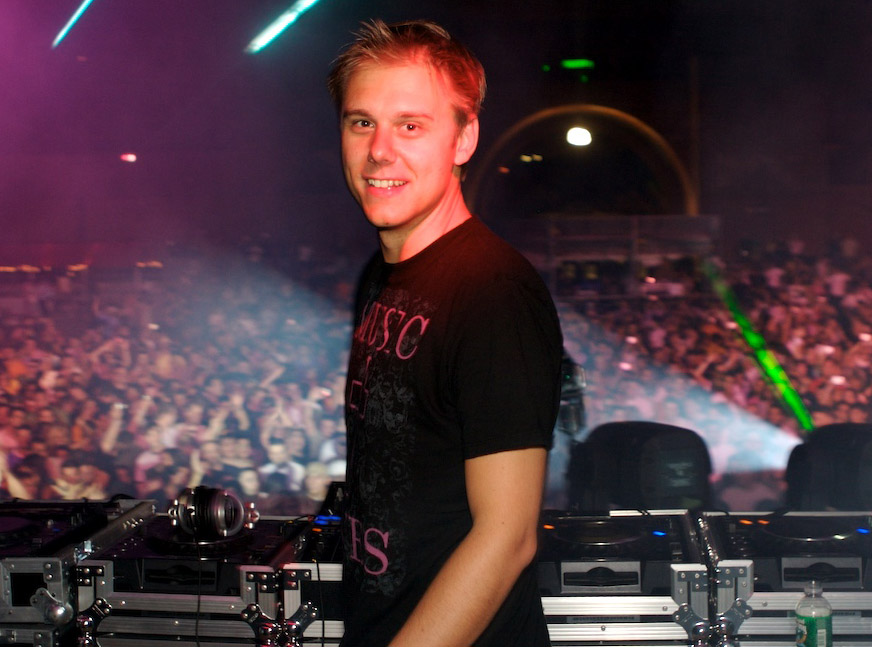
Armin van Buuren

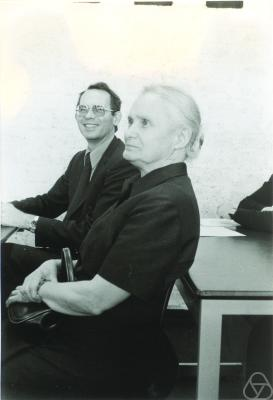
Tatyana Pavlovna Ehrenfest

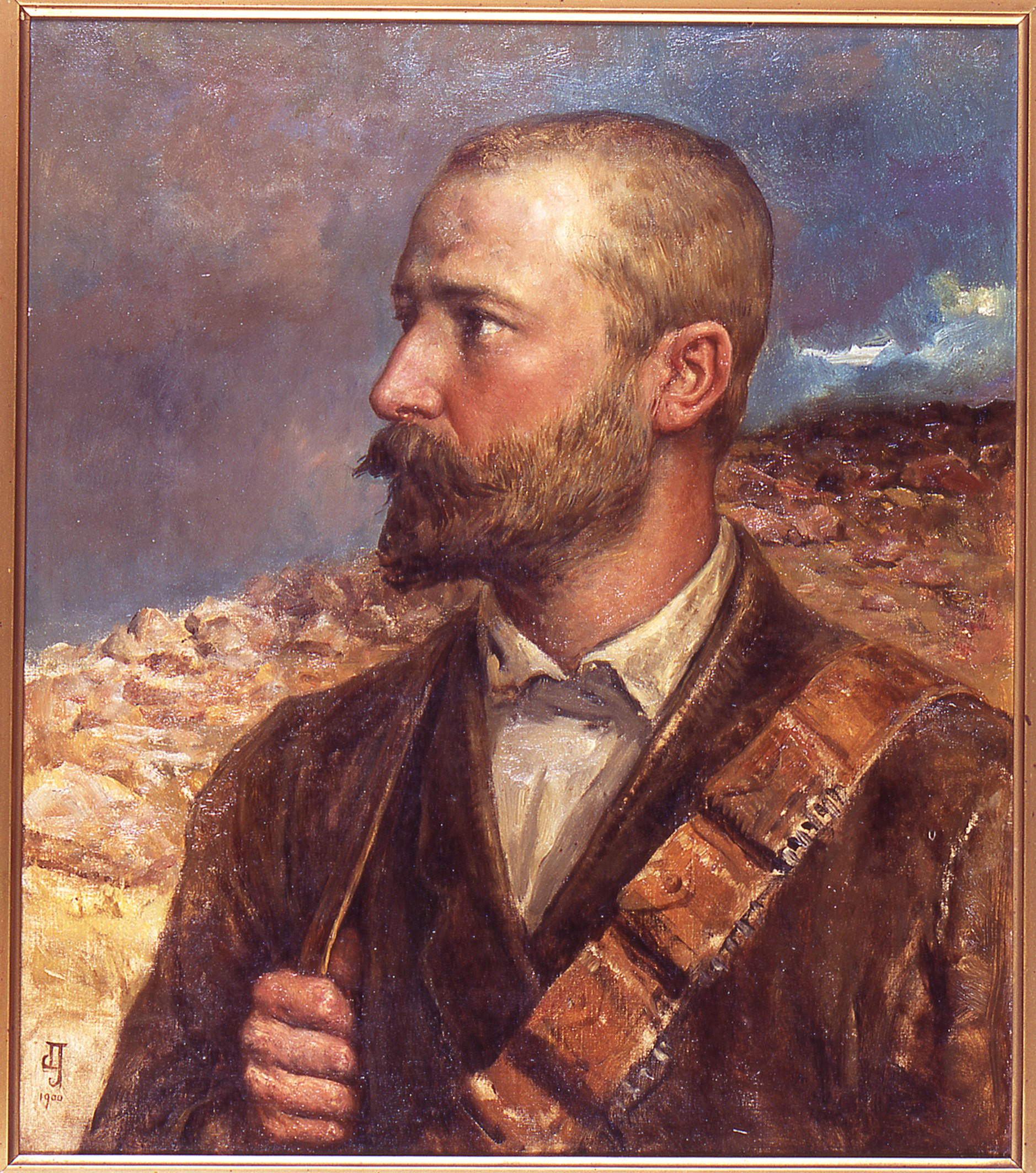
Herman Coster

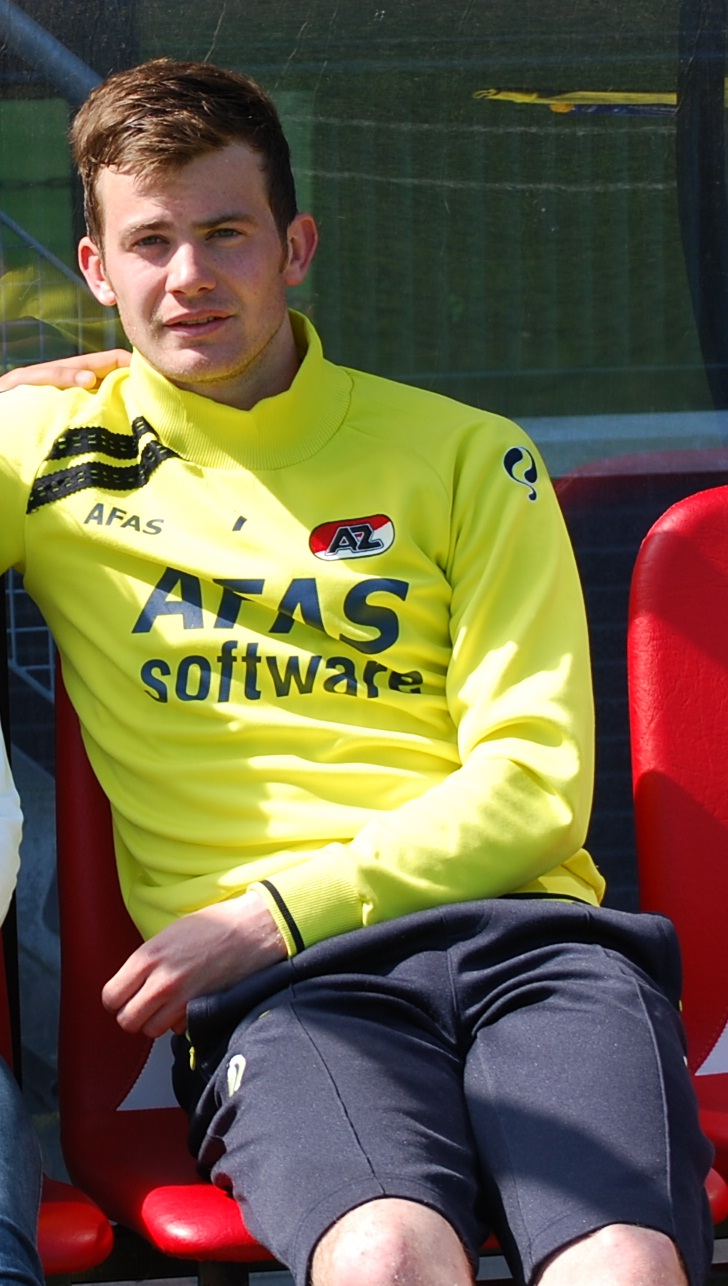
Erik Falkenburg

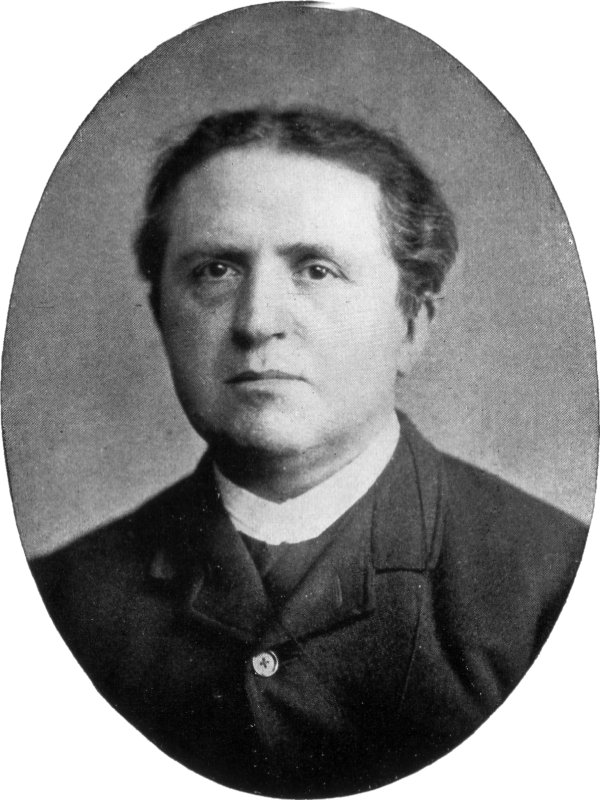
Abraham Kuyper

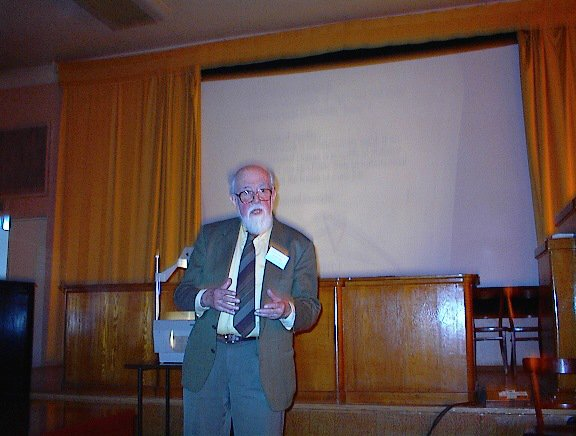
Gerard Laman

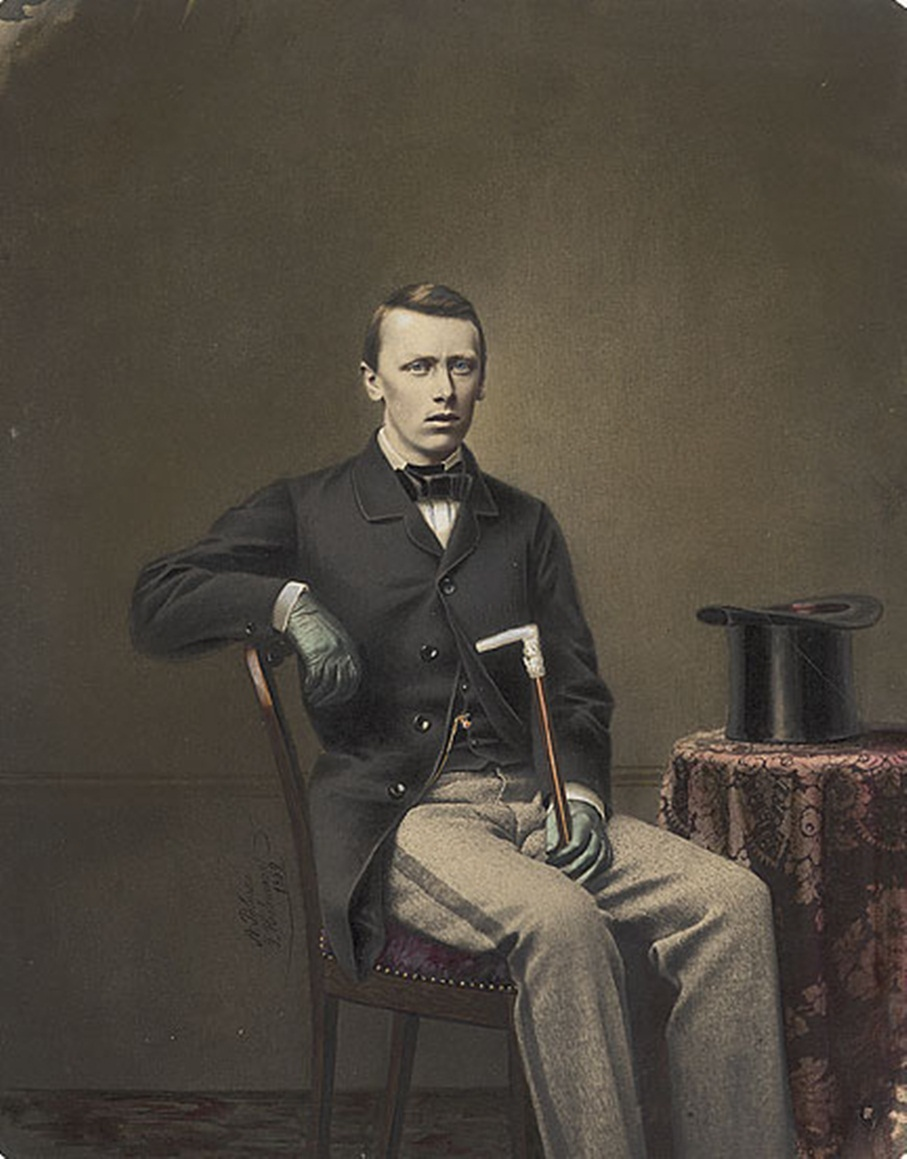
Willem van Oranje-Nassau (1840-1879)

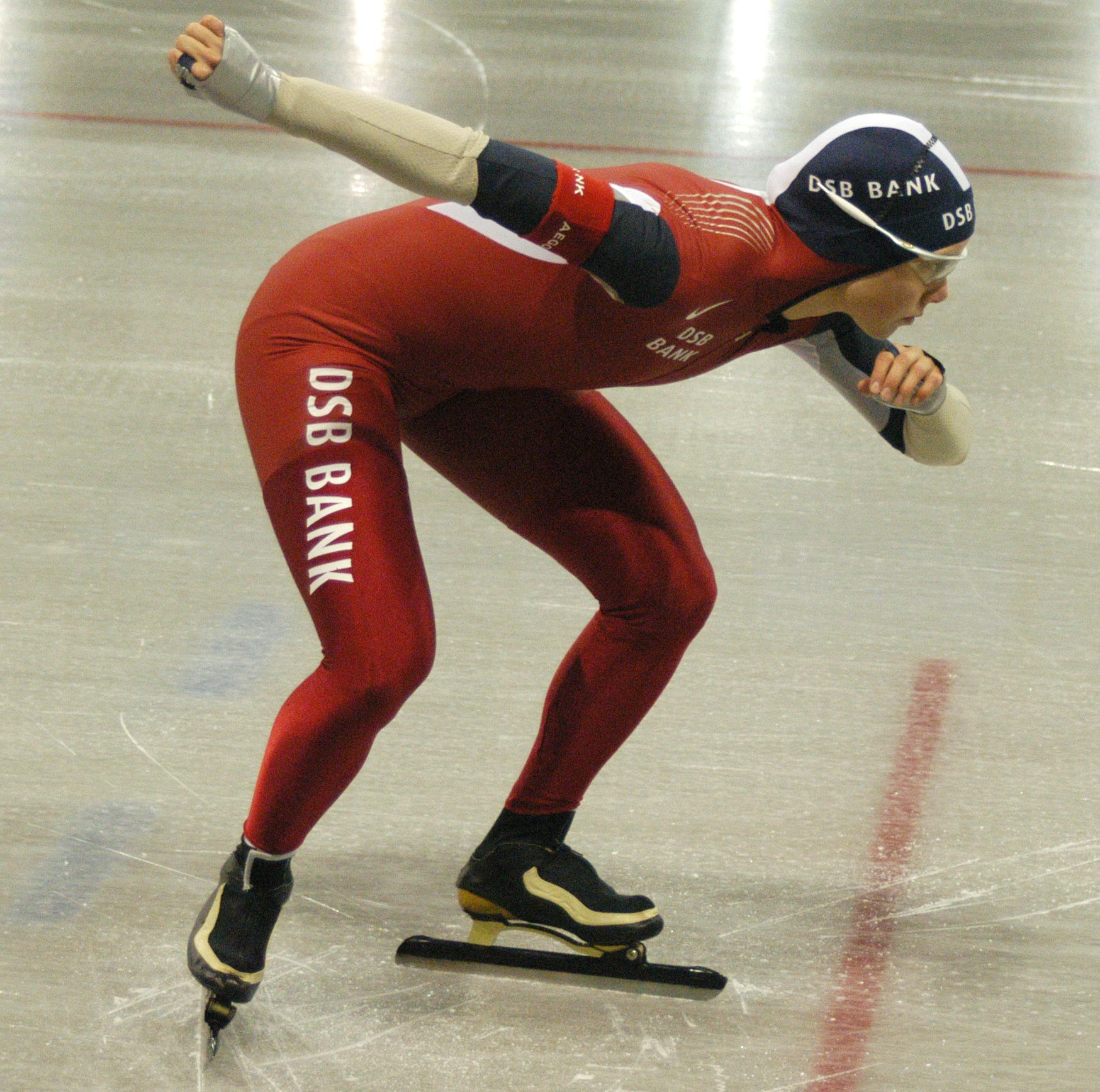
Laurine van Riessen

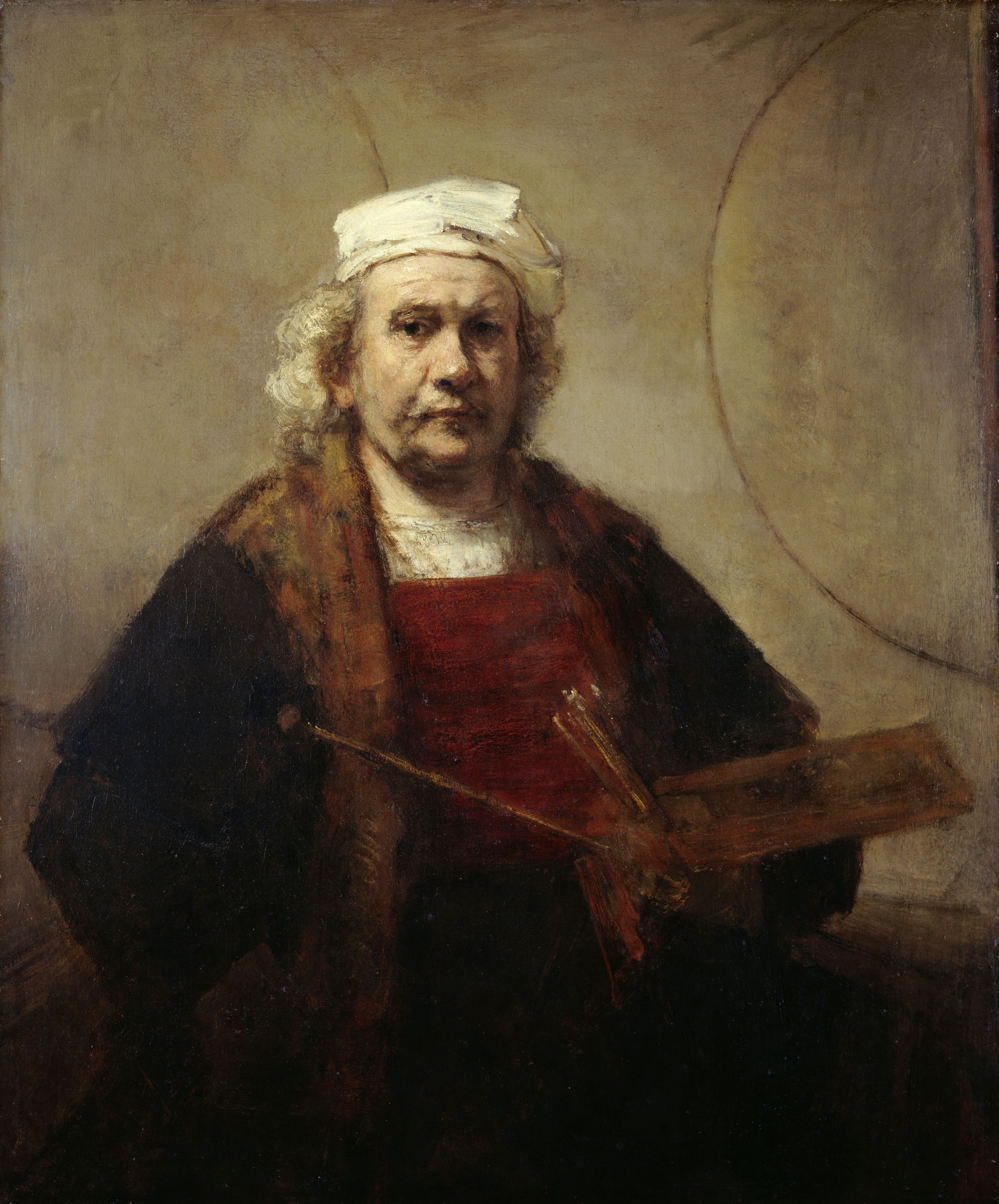
Rembrandt van Rijn

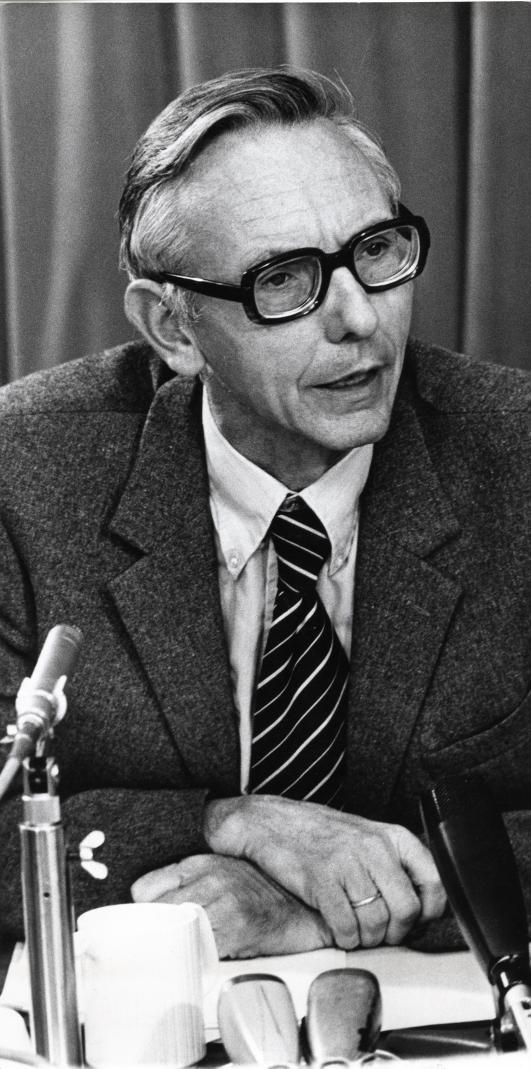
Max van der Stoel

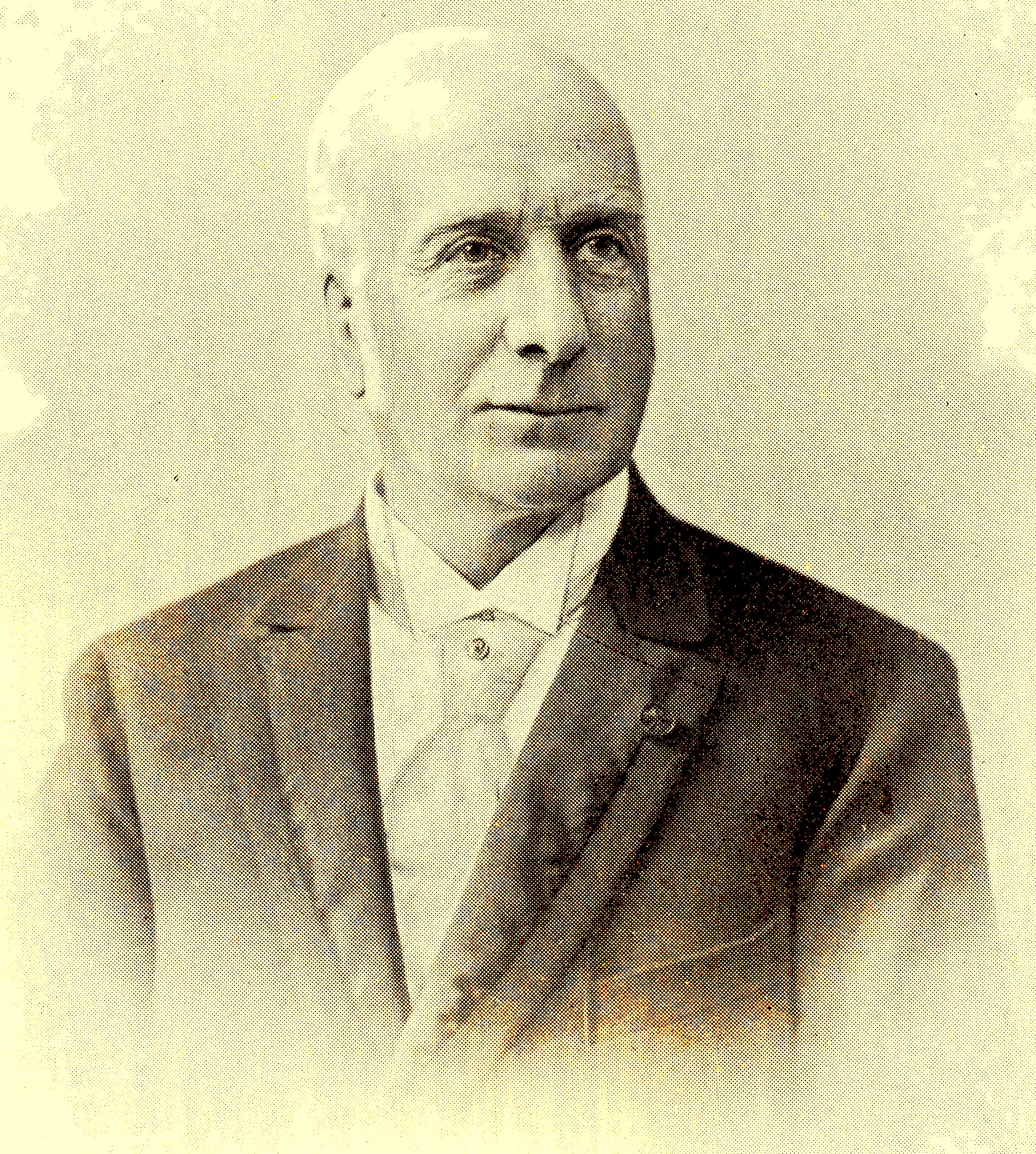
A.W. Sijthoff

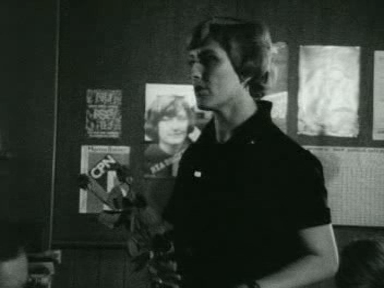
Ria Beckers

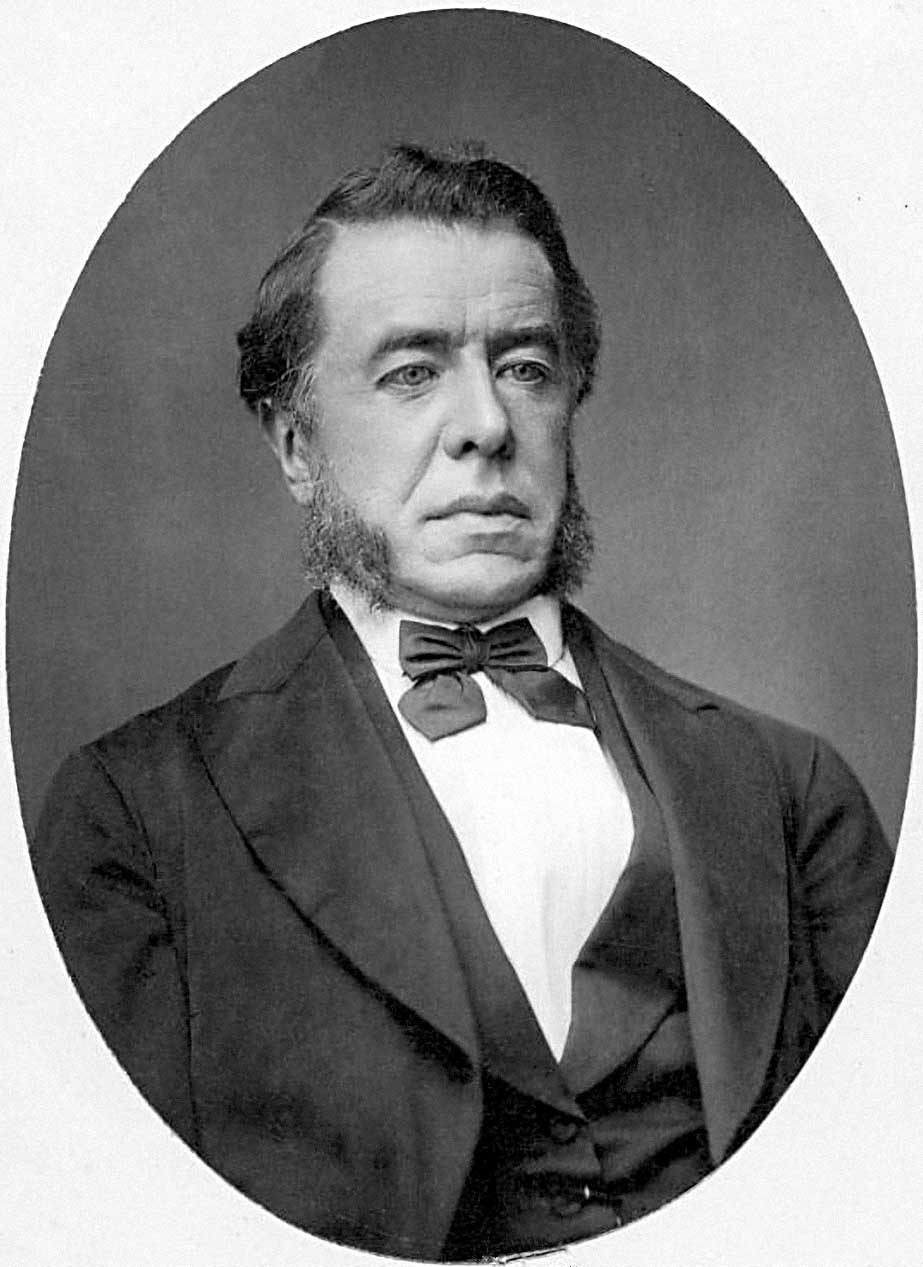
Robert Fruin

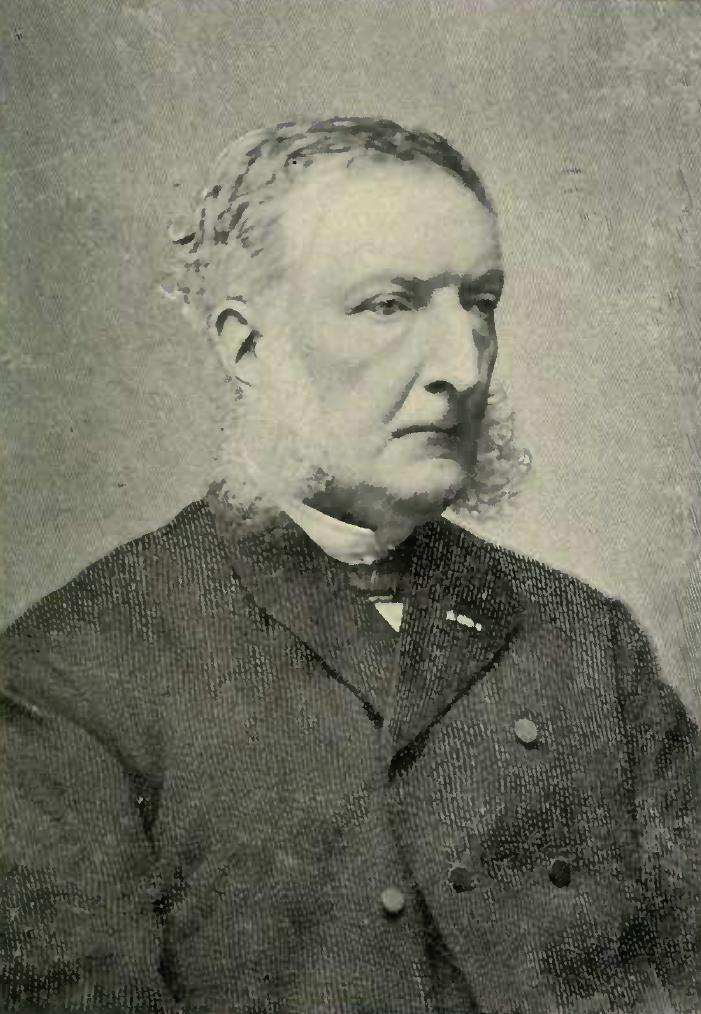
Abraham Kuenen

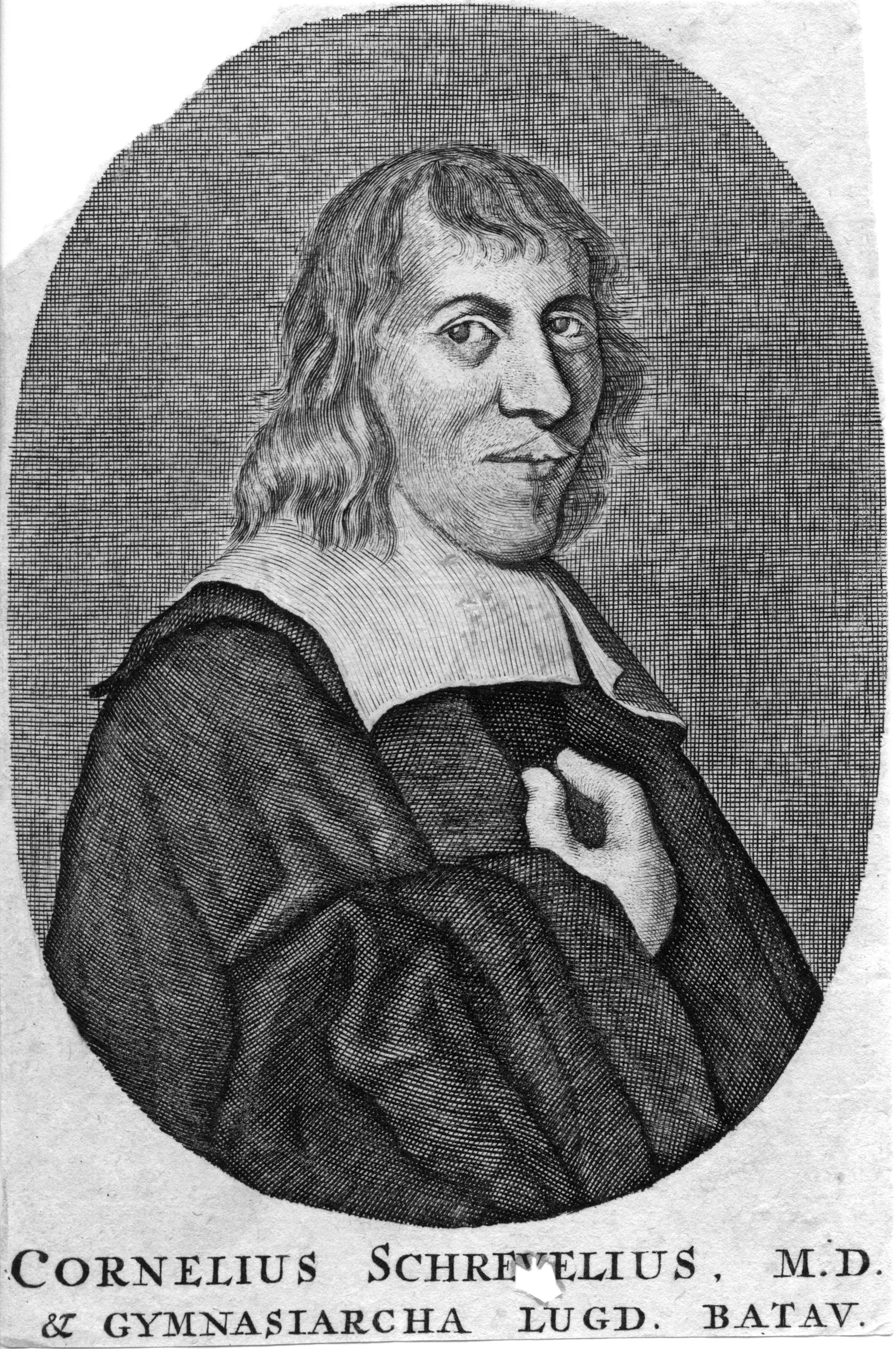
Cornelis Schrevel

== See also ==
- Education in the Netherlands
- List of the oldest schools in the world

== Publication ==
- A. M. Coebergh van den Braak: Meer dan zes eeuwen Leids Gymnasium. Leiden, 1988. 2e rev.ed., 1997: ISBN 90-800486-1-5
