= Janneke Jonkman =

Dutch writer

Janneke Jonkman (born Leiderdorp, Netherlands 20 January 1978) is a Dutch writer.

After primary school, Jonkman studied dance at the Koninklijk Conservatorium for three years. She quit her studies there and subsequently attended the Stedelijk Gymnasium in Leiden, where she obtained her diploma in 1997. Whilst studying Dutch at the Universiteit van Amsterdam she became a member of the editorship of the literary magazine Nymph.

In 2001, Jonkman's debut novel Soms Mis Je Me Nooit (Sometimes You Never Miss Me) was published by Dutch publishers Prometheus/Bert Bakker. Her second book was called De Droomfotograaf (The Dream Photographer). Her third novel, entitled Verboden Te Twijfelen (Forbidden To Doubt), was published in October 2006. Jonkman's novel Vederlicht(Featherlight) was published in 2009.

Janneke Jonkman co-authored the television movie Near Neighbors, along with director Marleen Jonkman, in 2010.

Interviews with Jonkman have appeared in Dutch magazines including Sp!ts, Folia, Spui, Plug, Avant Garde and Viva.

She currently lives and works in Amsterdam, working part-time for the magazine AvantGarde.
