= Hilda Geiringer =

Austrian mathematician

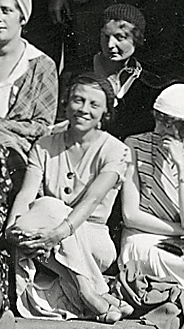
Dr. Hilda Pollaczek (upper right) at the ICM 1932

Hilda Geiringer (28 September 1893 – 22 March 1973), also known as Hilda von Mises and Hilda Pollaczek-Geiringer, was an Austrian mathematician.

== Life ==
Geiringer was born in 1893 in Vienna, Austria into a Jewish family. Her father, Ludwig Geiringer, was born in Hungary and her mother, Martha Wertheimer, was from Vienna. Her parents had married while her father was working in Vienna as a textile manufacturer.

=== University of Vienna ===
While still in high school, Geiringer showed great mathematical ability. Her parents supported her financially so that she could study mathematics at the University of Vienna. After receiving her first degree, Geiringer continued her study of mathematics in Vienna. She received her Ph.D. from the University of Vienna in 1917 under the guidance of Wilhelm Wirtinger with a thesis entitled "Trigonometrische Doppelreihen" about Fourier series in two variables. She spent the following two years as Leon Lichtenstein's assistant editing the Jahrbuch über die Fortschritte der Mathematik, a mathematics review journal.

=== Berlin Institute of Applied Mathematics ===
In 1921, Geiringer moved to Berlin where she was employed as an assistant to Richard Edler von Mises at the Institute of Applied Mathematics. In this same year, she married Felix Pollaczek who, like Geiringer, was born in Vienna into a Jewish family and had studied in Berlin. Pollaczek obtained his doctorate in 1922 and went on to work for the Reichspost (Postal service) in Berlin, applying mathematical methods to telephone connections. Hilda and Felix had a child, Magda, in 1922, but their marriage broke up. After the divorce, Geiringer continued working for von Mises and at the same time raised her child.

Although trained as a pure mathematician, Geiringer moved towards applied mathematics to fit in with the work being undertaken at the Institute of Applied Mathematics. Her work at this time was on statistics, probability theory, and also on the mathematical theory of plasticity. She submitted a thesis for her Habilitation to qualify as an instructor at the University of Berlin, but it was not immediately accepted. Geiringer lost the right to teach at the university in December 1933. In fact, she had been proposed for appointment to the position of extraordinary professor in 1933 but the proposal had been ”put on hold” once the Civil Service Law came into effect two months after Adolf Hitler attained power. This law disqualified Jews from serving as teachers, professors, judges, or in other government positions. Geiringer left Germany after she was dismissed from the University of Berlin, and, with Magda, she went to Brussels. There she was appointed to the Institute of Mechanics and began to apply mathematics to the theory of vibrations.

=== Istanbul ===
In 1934, Geiringer followed von Mises to Istanbul where she had been appointed as Professor of Mathematics and continued to research in applied mathematics, statistics, and probability theory. While in Turkey, Geiringer became intrigued with the basic principles of genetics formulated by the Augustinian friar Gregor Mendel. Between 1935 and 1939, she was preoccupied with uses for the theory of probability to which she and von Mises had made major, early contributions. Arguably Hilda Geiringer was one of the pioneers of what emerged as the burgeoning disciplines bearing such names as molecular genetics, human genetics, plant genetics, heredity in man, genomics, bioinformatics, biotechnology, biomedical engineering, and genetic engineering, among others. The world has not given sufficient credit to this intelligent woman's pioneering work mainly because it was done in Istanbul and published in Turkish journals. (Note: Reisman 2006, p. 215 provides extensive discussion of Geirniger's exile in Turkey and her saga in coming to the US.)

=== United States ===
Following Atatürk’s death in 1938, Geiringer and her daughter went to Bryn Mawr College in Pennsylvania in the United States, where she was appointed to a lecturer position. In addition to her lecturing duties at Bryn Mawr College, Geiringer undertook, as part of the war effort, classified work for the United States National Research Council.

During 1942, she gave an advanced summer course in mechanics at Brown University in Providence, Rhode Island, with the aim of raising the American standards of education to the level that had been attained in Germany. She wrote up her outstanding series of lectures on the geometrical foundations of mechanics and, although they were never properly published, these were widely disseminated and used in the United States for many years. To this day, even though Brown University never offered Geiringer permanent employment, the university takes full birthplace credit for these “mimeographed notes.” (Note: Also Anonymous undated, "History of the Applied Mathematics Department" 12 pages. Courtesy Brown University Archives. Found and supplied by Holly Snyder, University Archivist, Brown University, on January 1, 2006. The text of the document provides indication that this document was created between 1942 and 1945. It too refers to these notes by saying: "Special lecture notes in mimeographed form were carried away by departing students and led to a spontaneous demand for additional copies from the Government and industrial laboratories. This demand became so heavy that it was necessary to place some of the notes on sale. To date, the lecture notes of 14 courses have been offered in this way, and 7500 copies have been sold." The document goes on with the following judgment: "The value of so wide a distribution of special literature in the field of applied mathematics is intangible and not readily appraised. There can be little doubt, however, that its influence has been important and lasting.")

=== Marriage to Richard Edler von Mises ===
Geiringer and von Mises married in 1943 and, the following year, she left her part-time, low-pay lecturing post at Bryn Mawr College to be nearer to him and because the Wheaton College offered her her first permanent position in the USA. She accepted a post as Professor and Chairman of the Mathematics Department at Wheaton College in Norton, Massachusetts. During the week, she taught at the college, then traveled to Cambridge every weekend to be with von Mises.

For many reasons, this was not a good arrangement. There were only two members of the mathematics faculty at Wheaton College and Geiringer longed for a situation where she was among mathematicians who were carrying out research.

=== Discrimination ===
Geiringer applied for positions at other New England universities, but these applications failed due to fairly open discrimination against women. Discrimination against Jewish mathematicians was also a factor. However, she took it all remarkably calmly, believing that if she could do something for future generations of women then she would have achieved something positive. She also never gave up her research while at Wheaton College. In 1953 she wrote:

"have to work scientifically, besides my college work. This is a necessity for me; I never stopped it since my student days, it is the deepest need of my life."

One response to a job application she received was quite typical:

"I am sure that our President would not approve of a woman. We have some women on our staff, so it is not merely prejudice against women, yet it is partly that, for we do not want to bring in more if we can get men."

On 23 June 1939, Harvard University’s astronomy professor Harlow Shapley wrote on her behalf to Radcliffe College which operated as Harvard’s sister school. Though it drew instructors and other resources from Harvard, Radcliffe graduates were not granted Harvard degrees until 1963. Even though Geiringer was a better mathematician and a better teacher than Harvard could provide to the women at Radcliffe, Geiringer was never offered a real job by either.

In a letter dated 7 March 1941, Oswald Veblen, writing in her behalf, stated: "You know of course that there is more and more demand for knowledge of statistics in several sciences. It is very desirable that when possible the courses in statistics should be given by people who are well-grounded mathematically as well as interested in its applications. Teachers who satisfy both of these conditions are by no means common." He concluded that thought with "Mrs. Geiringer is perhaps the only woman who satisfies both conditions." Three days later, Hermann Weyl wrote: "In her field of applied mathematics, and especially in mathematical statistics, she is a first-rate scholar of great experience and accomplishment." He then added, "in my opinion applied mathematics, which forms the bridge from abstract mathematics to the more concrete neighbor sciences, has up to now been unduly neglected in this country; that in the present circumstances its importance has increased considerably."

As late as 28 May 1943 she wrote to Hermann Weyl at the Institute for Advanced Study at Princeton. “I am certainly conscious of the fact that it is hard for a refugee + woman to find something. Nevertheless I have not quite given up hope. I need not say that a research position would be just as welcome to me as teaching.” “I hope there will be better conditions for the next generations of women,” she wrote. “In the meantime, one has to go on as well as possible.”

=== Work at Harvard ===
In 1953, Richard von Mises died and the following year Geiringer, although retaining her job at Wheaton College, began to work at Harvard, completing and editing many of von Mises’ unfinished works, with the help of von Mises' student Geoffrey S. S. Ludford. To do this, however, she had to secure a grant from the Office of Naval Research and it was then that Harvard offered her a temporary position as a Research Fellow in Mathematics. In the archives at Harvard University, there are eight boxes bearing the caption “MISES, HILDA VON ( Mrs. Richard von Mises, known professionally as Hilda Geiringer ) (Applied Mathematics)” HUG 4574.142. The contents of these boxes involve only professional matters such as her “speeches and variants of published works…a few related letters and two notebooks. Boxes 2 and 3 contain manuscripts relating to published items and have numbers referring to the bibliography in HUG 4574.160.” In 1959, Geiringer was elected a Fellow of the American Academy of Arts and Sciences. In 1956, the University of Berlin, perhaps to assuage group guilt, perhaps to add a luminary name to its roster, elected her Professor Emeritus and placed her on full salary. In 1959, she formally retired from Wheaton College and, in the following year, that College honored her with the award of an honorary Doctorate of Science. She was also a Fellow of the Institute of Mathematical Statistics.

== See also ==
- Geiringer–Laman theorem
