= Sijthoff =

Sijthoff may refer to:

== People ==
- Albertus Willem Sijthoff (1829–1913), a prominent Dutch publisher
- Albert Georg Sijthoff (1853–1927), son of Albertus Willem Sijthoff and publisher of the Haagsche Courant
- Bob Sijthoff, descendant of Albertus Willem Sijthoff who sued Wikimedia in the Netherlands in 2008

== Other ==
- 3201 Sijthoff, an asteroid named after Albert Georg Sijthoff
- Luitingh-Sijthoff, a Dutch publishing company passed down through the Sijthoff family
- Sijthoff Planetarium, a planetarium in the Hague that burned down in 1975
