= NDC Mediagroep =

Dutch publisher

- Predecessors: FGDP; NDC; NDC|VDK
- Founded: 1 January 1955; 71 years ago 1 June 2007; 19 years ago Both in Leeuwarden, Netherlands
- Founder: Abraham Ferwerda
- Defunct: April 1, 2025
- Fate: Mediahuis Noord merged into Mediahuis Nederland
- Successor: Mediahuis Noord
- Owner: FB Oranjewoud; Mediahuis

NDC Mediagroep, previously known as FGDP and later as Mediahuis Noord, was a Dutch publisher of newspapers, magazines, and websites focused on the three northern provinces of the Netherlands: Drenthe, Friesland and Groningen. It was owned by FB Oranjewoud and its final years by Mediahuis, a Belgian company. Headquarters were in Leeuwarden, other offices are in Groningen and Meppel. In addition to three main provinces, NDC published and distributed also in the Kop van Overijssel, Noordoostpolder, and northern Flevoland.

== History ==
=== 1752–1990: Leeuwarder Courant and Friese Pers ===
The earliest history of the Mediahuis Noord started with the first publication in Leeuwarden of the Leeuwarder Courant by Abraham Ferwerda, on 29 July 1752. After Ferwerda's death, his son-in-law, Doeke Ritske Smeding, took over and led the paper though the French occupation, during which many Dutch papers were shut down by the occupier. Smeding died in 1814; Pieter Koumans Smeding, his cousin, ran the paper until 1854. His heirs owned the newspaper until 1947.

On 1 January 1955 the publishers the Leeuwarder Courant of Leeuwarden the Friese Koerier of Heerenveen, founded as De Koerier on 16 April 1945 as a resistance newspaper, merged to form the Friese Pers. On 1 November 1969, the Friese Koerier was merged into the Leeuwarder Courant.

=== 1988–1990: Nieuwsblad van het Noorden and Hazewinkel ===
On 2 June 1988, Joan Nieuwenhuis began publishing the Nieuwsblad van het Noorden in Groningen. Within months of the first publication of the Nieuwsblad, printer Ruurt Hazewinkel took over the publication. His sons continued the operation after him.

In 1977, the Hazewinkel Pers private limited company was founded.

=== 1990–2005: FGDP and Noordelijke Dagblad Combinatie ===
On 2 January 1990, the Friese Pers, publishers of the Leeuwarder Counrant, merged with Hazewinkel Pers, publishers of the Nieuwsblad van het Noorden, to form the Fries Gronings Drentse Pers (FGDP). FGDP was renamed Noordelijke Dagblad Combinatie (NDC) on 1 July 1994.

On 3 January 1994, FGDP bought the newspapers of Wegener in its region, the Drentse Courant and Groninger Dagblad. On 2 April 2002 the Groninger Dagblad, Drentse Courant, and Nieuwsblad van het Noorden were merged into the Dagblad van het Noorden that became the only regional daily of the provinces Groningen and Drenthe. The Leeuwarder Courant continued unchanged in Friesland and was by then the only regional newspaper to have a nonfree competitor in its region, the Christian Friesch Dagblad.

=== 2005–2021: NDC|VBK and NDC Mediagroep ===
NDC merged in March 2005 with book publisher Veen Bosch & Keuning (VBK) to form NDC|VBK. On 1 June 2007, the NDC Mediagroep was established as the subsidiary of NDC|VDK that would handle interests in periodicals, radio, and TV. The interest in radio and TV was brief. In late 2012 the VBK book publication activities were spun off. As a result, the NDC|VBK holder company became obsolete and the NDC Mediagroep took the lead.

On 1 July 2013 the Friesch Dagblad, a title owned by the Fryslân Boppe Oranjewoud Foundation, was added to the NDC Mediagroep and FB Oranjewoud became the majority (51%) stakeholder in NDC Mediagroep. Other shares were held by ING Bank (33%) and foundation Je Maintiendrai (16%). On 19 June 2015, when ING Bank exited NDC Mediagroep, FB increased its holdings to 83%, with Je Maintiendrai owning the other 17%.

In June 2017, NDC Mediagroep purchased Boom Nieuwsmedia in Meppel, the subsidiary of Royal Boom that managed newspapers, magazines and websites. The purchase enabled NDC Mediagroep to strengthen its position in South Drenthe and South Friesland and in North Flevoland and North Overijssel. NDC continued to use the name Boom Nieuwsmedia for its publications centered in Meppel until 1 January 2018. The Kop van Overijssel and the North Flevopolder were extensions of NDC's reach.

As a consequence of expensive acquisitions and reorganizations and deteriorating income from subscriptions, sales, and advertisements, NDC Mediagroep reported in February 2020 losing 5.2 million euros over 2017 and 4.8 million over 2018. In September 2020, Mediahuis acquired NDC Mediagroep.

=== 2021–2025: Mediahuis Noord ===
In late 2021, the company changed its name to Mediahuis Noord. In January 2022, Mediahuis Noord acquired Hoekstra Krantendruk in Emmeloord. By March 2022, the printing facilities and offices in Emmeloord closed. Hoekstra continued as a brand of Mediahuis Noord Grafisch Bedrijf, the print and graphics subsidiary of Mediahuis Noord, located in Leeuwarden.

On 1 April 2025, Mediahuis Noord and Mediahuis Limburg merged into Mediahuis Nederland.

== Publications ==
=== Daily newspapers ===
- Dagblad van het Noorden
- Leeuwarder Courant
- Friesch Dagblad

=== Weekly newspapers ===
==== Drenthe ====
- Asser Courant
- Coevorden Huis aan Huis
- Emmen Nu
- Gezinsblad
- Hoogeveensche Courant
- Krant van Midden-Drenthe
- Krant van Hoogeveen
- Meppeler Courant
- Nieuwe Meppeler
- Roder Journaal
- Westervelder
- Wolder Courant
- Zuidoosthoeker

==== Flevoland ====
- De Noordoostpolder
- FlevoPost Dronten
- FlevoPost Lelystad

==== Friesland ====
- Balkster Courant
- Bolswards Nieuwsblad
- Drachtster Courant
- De Feanster
- Franeker Courant
- Heerenveense Courant
- Huis aan Huis Leeuwarden
- Jouster Courant
- Kollumer Courant
- Nieuwe Dockumer Courant
- Nieuw Ooststellingwerver
- Sneeker Nieuwsblad
- Nieuwsblad Noord-Oost Friesland
- Stellingwerf
- De Woudklank
- Zuid-Friesland

==== Groningen ====
- Eemsbode
- Groninger Gezinsbode
- Harener Weekblad
- Hoogezand-Sappemeer-krant
- Kanaalstreek
- Noorderkrant
- Streekblad
- Ter Apeler Courant
- Veendammer
- Westerkwartier

==== Overijssel ====
- De Staphorster
- Steenwijker Courant

=== Websites ===
- Mensenlinq
- TweeNul
