= Waterstad FM =

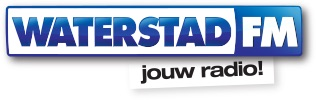
- Sneek; Netherlands
- Broadcast area: Friesland

Programming
- Format: Adult contemporary

Ownership
- Owner: Beheer Regionale Radio
- Sister stations: Freez FM and RadioNL

History
- First air date: 2000

Links
- Webcast: Webstream; Playlist
- Website: waterstadfm.nl

Waterstad FM is a regional Dutch commercial radio station. Waterstad FM takes its name from "the city of waters", where the station for the first time on the cable could be heard, namely Sneek.

== History ==
Waterstad FM was founded in 2000. After the spectrum auction in 2003, Waterstad FM started broadcasting in Friesland and the Noordoostpolder.

On 1 November 2007, Waterstad FM was acquired by the NDC Mediagroep. It managed Waterstad FM, RadioNL and Freez FM through its subsidiary NDC Radio.

On 1 May 2013, NDC Mediagroep sold its radio stations to Beheer Regionale Radio, operator of TV Oranje.

== Format ==
Initially, Waterstad FM was a non-stop music station. Since September 2010, it also features presented programs. Regional news on Waterstad FM is provided in cooperation with editors of the Leeuwarder Courant and Dagblad van het Noorden.
