= Albertus Willem Sijthoff =

Dutch publisher (1829–1913)

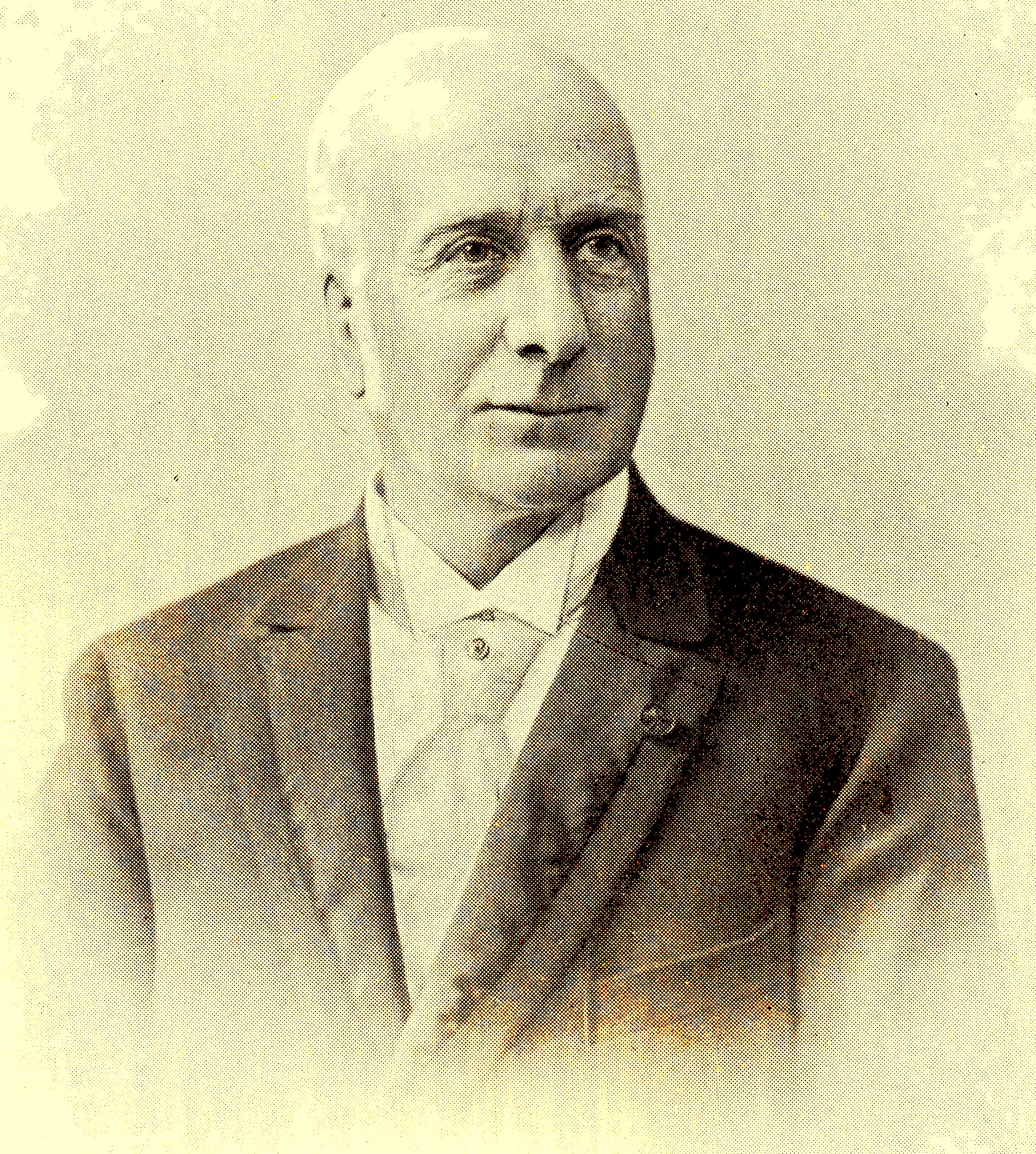
- Born: 30 June 1829; Leiden, Netherlands
- Died: 29 July 1913 (aged 84); Feldafing, Bavaria, Germany
- Other names: A.W. Sijthoff
- Occupations: Publisher, printer
- Spouse: Waldina Sijthoff
- Awards: Order of Orange-Nassau; Order of the Oak Crown; Order of the Polar Star

Albertus Willem Sijthoff (30 June 1829 – 29 July 1913) was a prominent Dutch publisher from Leiden, Netherlands.

== Early life ==
Sijthoff was born in 1829 to an established family in Leiden. He was educated at the Stedelijk Gymnasium in Leiden, which had established a reputation as the "city of books." His father was a prominent baker who died in 1843.

== Publishing work ==
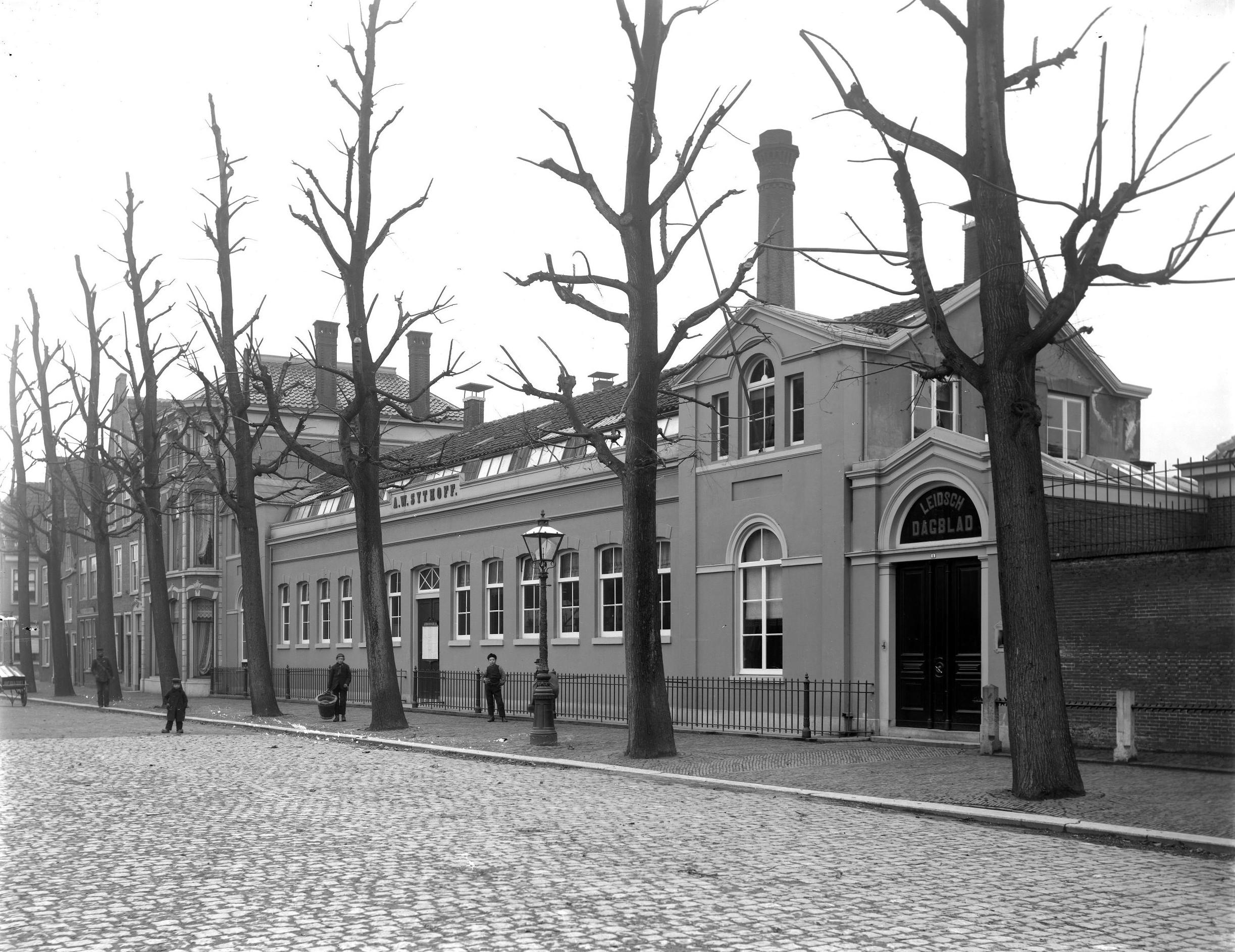
This Sijthoff printing office in Leiden was designed in 1852.

Sijthoff worked in the book and newspaper printing office of J.G. La Lau, and the Hague bookselling firm of K. Fuhri. After working in Paris as a resident typographist, Sijthhoff first spoke to colleagues about starting his own printing business on October 20, 1850. The A.W. Sijthoff company was established in Leiden in 1851.

Sijthoff rose to prominence in the trade of translated books. He wrote a letter, dated November 12, 1899, to Queen Wilhelmina of the Netherlands regarding his opposition to the petition to become a signatory to the Berne Convention for the Protection of Literary and Artistic Works. He felt that the international copyright restrictions would stifle the publishing industry in the Netherlands.

Sijthoff was a member of the Society of Dutch Literature. He was knighted in the Order of Orange-Nassau, the Order of the Oak Crown and the Order of the Polar Star.

== Retirement and legacy ==
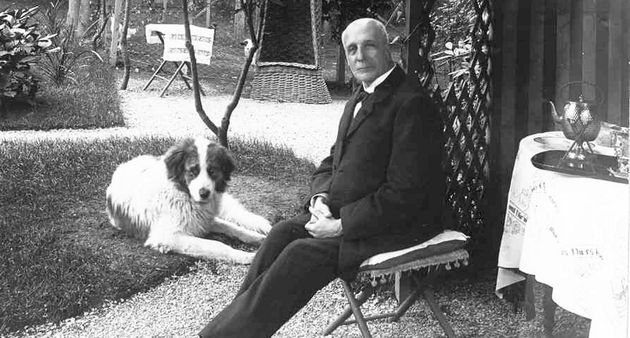
Albertus Willem Sijthoff at Villa Waldberta, circa 1910

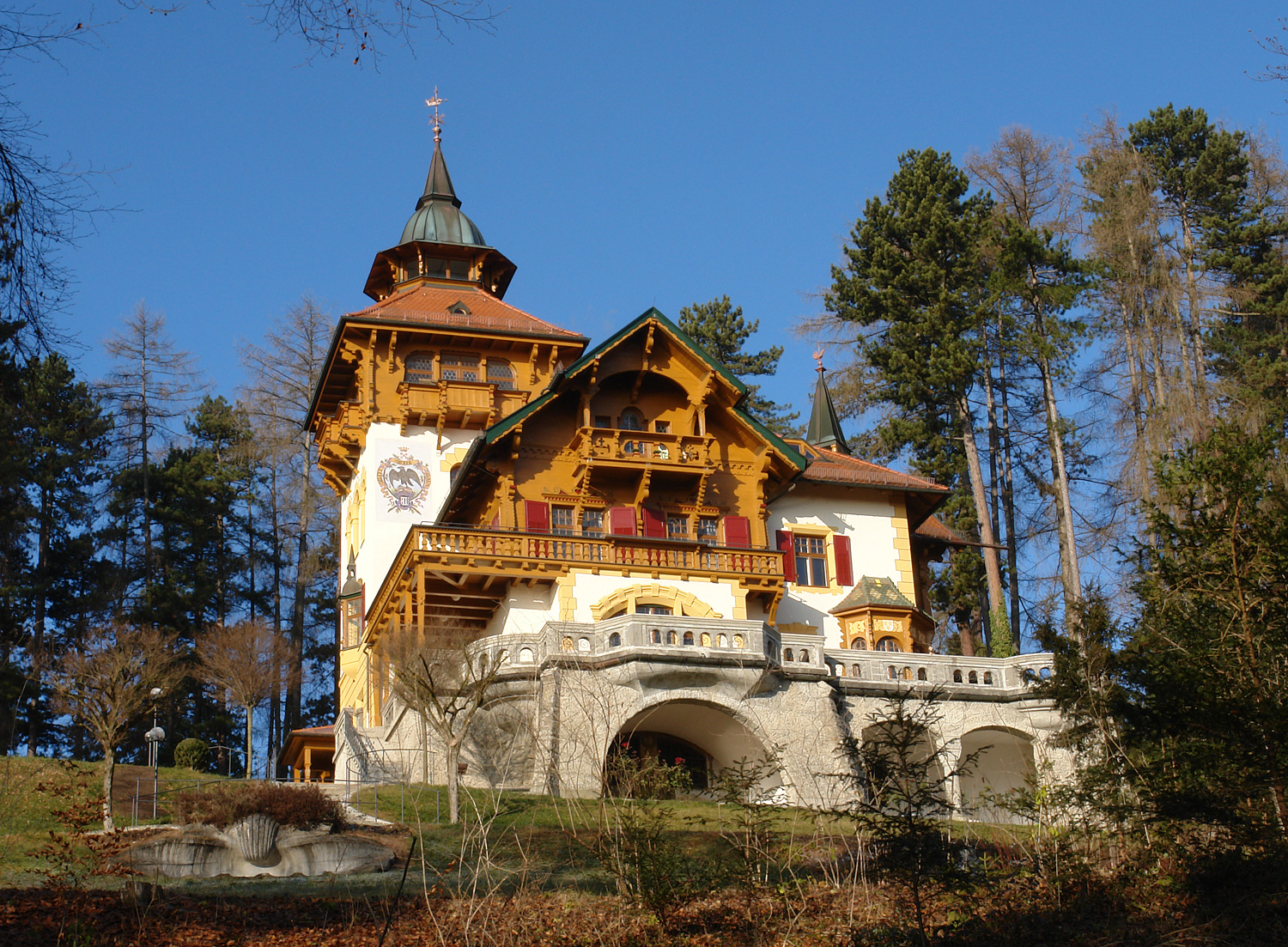
Sijthoff spent his retirement at Villa Waldberta in Feldafing.

Sijthoff spent his retirement at Villa Waldberta, an estate in Feldafing, Germany which he acquired from Munich banker Bernhard Schuler in 1903. Previously called Villa Felsenheim, Sijthoff renamed it after himself and his wife Waldina. Sijthoff lived there until his death in 1913. Willi Daume, president of the Munich organizing committee of the 1972 Summer Olympics occupied the villa from 1968 to 1974.

His son Albert Georg Sijthoff continued in his father's footsteps, taking over as publisher of the Haagsche Courant. The Sijthoff Planetarium in The Hague was named in his son's honor in 1934, as well as the asteroid 3201 Sijthoff, which was discovered in 1960. The family's publishing company continues to operate today as Luitingh-Sijthoff.

== See also ==
- Sijthoff
