= RadioNL =

Radio station in Sneek, Netherlands

RADIONL
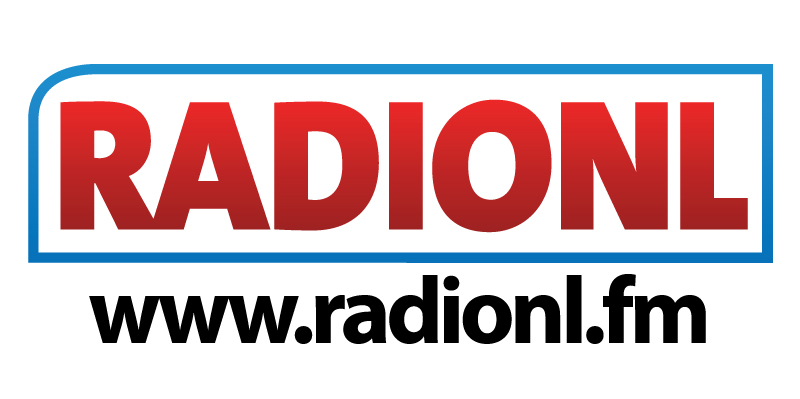
- Sneek; Netherlands
- Broadcast area: Netherlands
- Frequencies: FM, Cable and Internet

Programming
- Format: Dutch music

Ownership
- Owner: NDC Mediagroep
- Sister stations: Freez FM and Waterstad FM

History
- First air date: 1 March 2005

Links
- Webcast: Webstream; Watch Live; Playlist
- Website: www.radionl.fm

RadioNL (stylized as RADIONL) is a commercial Dutch radio station founded by Nico Silvius in October 2004 and launched on 1 March 2005. The station plays mostly Dutch music.

The station can be received terrestrially and through cable in Friesland, Groningen, Drenthe, Flevoland, Overijssel, Gelderland, North Holland and Dutch and Belgian Limburg. In addition, the station also provides a live stream on the internet.

In 2009, the Morgenstond program won the Gouden RadioRing, the audience award for best radio program of the Netherlands.

Top 30 All Time, presented by De Deurzakkers and De Sjonnies.

In 2015 RadioNL celebrated its 10th anniversary with the Mega Piraten Festijn in Nieuwleusen.

== Programs ==
- Morgenstond, with Marcel de Vries & Notaris Mulder
- Het Feest der Herkenning, with Alfred Voogd
- Werken met wouda, with Taeke Wouda
- Op Volle Kracht, with Hessel Wijkstra
- Johan in de middag, with Johan Terpstra
- De Jan Paparazzi show, with Jan Paparazzi
- Radionl Top 30, with Jan Paparazzi
- RadioNL Cafe, with Erik Ferwerda
- Gezellige Zaterdag, with several RadioNL DJs
- Radionl nostalgie, with previously Hessel Wijkstra later DJs
- RadioNL Non-stop, exemption is the summer & winter tour
- RadioNL Zomertoer, with several RadioNL DJs
- Vroeg uit de veren, with Alfred Voogd
- Werk in Uitvoering, with Marcel de Vries
- Afslag 3-6, with Taeke Wouda
- Nederlandstalige Top 30, with Taeke Wouda
- Dag In Dag Uit, with Alfred Hof
