= Henri Dekking (writer) =

Dutch journalist

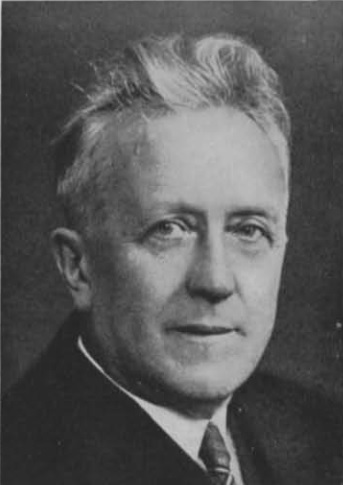
- Born: Henri Marinus Dekking; 13 December 1871; Rotterdam, Netherlands
- Died: 8 October 1939 (aged 67); Rotterdam, Netherlands
- Occupations: journalist, writer and playwright
- Known for: Winterkoninkje (1906); Kwakzalvers (1917)

Henri Dekking (13 December 1871 – 8 October 1939) was a Dutch journalist and writer.

== Biography ==
Dekking was born on 13 December 1871 in Rotterdam as Henri Marinus Dekking. Rotterdam would remain his home for the rest of his life.

Dekking was editor at the Dutch newspaper Rotterdamsch Nieuwsblad from 1892 until 1937. Dekking was chairman of the Nederlandse Vereniging van Journalisten, and was a member of the organisation for 35 years.

Dekking performed in plays. He usually translated the plays himself. Dekking is best remembered for his performance of Cyrano de Bergerac which he performed over 500 times during his life. He was also active as a playwright. His best known work is Kwakzalvers (1917).

He wrote several novels. He made his debut with Getroffenen (1904), and is best remembered for Winterkoninkje (1906). He became officer in the Orde van Oranje-Nassau.

Dekking died in Rotterdam on 8 October 1939, aged 67.

== Bibliography ==
- Verdoes, P. (1941). "Henri Dekking". Jaarboek van de Maatschappij der Nederlandse Letterkunde (in Dutch). Leiden: E.J. Brill.
