= Freez FM =

Dutch regional radio station

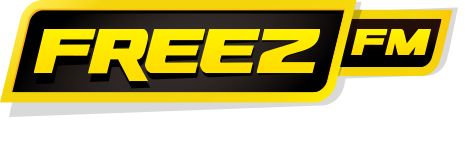
- Netherlands
- Broadcast area: Netherlands

Programming
- Format: Pop and Rock (Adult Contemporary)

Ownership
- Owner: Beheer Regionale Radio
- Sister stations: RadioNL and Waterstad FM

Links
- Webcast: Webstream; Playlist
- Website: www.freezfm.nl

Freez FM is a Dutch commercial regional radio station which broadcasts non-stop pop and rock music, interspersed with regional news.

== History ==
=== 2000s: First run ===
Freez FM was founded in 2000, when it broadcast on 96.6 FM in North Friesland, 96.0 FM in East Friesland and 94.1 FM in Southwest Friesland. After the Zero Base auction in June 2003 the station added a wave frequency in Groningen on 89.1 FM. From December 2003 the station could also be heard in the Randstad on 96.3 FM in Alkmaar, 93.6 FM in Amsterdam, 97.3 FM in Haarlem and 97.4 FM in Purmerend.

In 2004, the North Holland frequencies were acquired by WILD FM. On 21 September 2006 in the Groningen frequency was acquired by RADIONL. A day later RADIONL could also be heard on the Frisian frequencies. Freez FM ceased to exist.

=== 2010s: Second run ===
On 1 March 2013 Freez FM returned. This time it could be heard on the station frequencies that were previously used by Arrow Classic Rock Noord. The new Freez FM had the same format as the previous Freez FM and its yellow/black logo was based on the old logo.

Along with Waterstad FM and RADIONL, Freez FM was owned by the NDC Mediagroep. NDC has sold its radio stations on 1 May 2013 to Beheer Regionale Radio, operator of TV Oranje. From April 2015 Freez FM features also presented programs.

On 30 December 2015 the station disappeared from the airwaves to make place for Radio 8FM. The station returned via DAB+ in Friesland in January 2016 and in the northern region of North-Holland.
