= Bob Sijthoff =

Dutch businessman

Henri Gregory (Bob) Sijthoff
- Born: Henri Gregory Sijthoff; September 1, 1944 (age 81); Wassenaar, Netherlands
- Other name: Bob Sijthoff
- Occupation: Businessman
- Family: Sijthoff family

Henri Gregory (Bob) Sijthoff is a Dutch businessman primarily known for his career in the publishing industry within his family's company, which owned Het Financieele Dagblad.

He is a member of the well known Dutch Sijthoff publishing family. In 2008, he asked the court to order Stichting Wikimedia Nederland to remove the Wikipedia article about himself, which the court rejected. In 2009 Sijthoff was convicted for extortion of a Swiss banker for which he was eventually sentenced to 1 year probation.

== Family ==
Sijthoff is a descendant of the famous Dutch Sijthoff family. The family is known through their connections to the Luitingh-Sijthoff publishing company and to several regional newspapers like the now defunct Haagsche Courant. The publishing company and the Haagsche Courant were the property of Sijthoff's grandfather Henri, but have since passed into the hands of other Sijthoff family members.

== Het Financieele Dagblad ==
Sijthoff's father, Henk Sijthoff (1915–2000), was the founder of the Dutch business newspaper Het Financieele Dagblad (The Financial Daily). After a lengthy negotiation, this newspaper was ultimately sold in 1997, for a converted sum of €38 million. Bob Sijthoff had become a Commissioner of the paper well before this sale. Founder Henk Sijthoff died three years later and Bob Sijthoff inherited a part of his wealth. Sijthoff has since resigned as Commissioner of Het Financieele Dagblad and sold his company interests. Willem Sijthoff, a grandnephew of Bob, together with a company known as HAL Investments, became the new owners of Het Financieele Dagblad.

== Controversies ==
=== Prison time for extortion ===
Sijthoff has been involved in several controversies in his time. On 15 April 2008, it became known that Sijthoff had invited Swiss banker Hurlimann to his office in 2004, to put pressure on him to make a statement in favor of Sijthoff. In April 2008, Sijthoff had to account for his actions before the court in The Hague. In July 2004, Sijthoff had already been held by the Swiss Justice and arrested and detained for two weeks. On 11 March 2009, The Hague court convicted Sijthoff to 18 months in prison for extortion. He appealed and after his appeal in 2013, his sentence changed to a year probation.

=== Housing deal ===
In an article in Quote in July 2006, Jort Kelder states that a confidant of Willem Endstra told him that Sijthoff bought two pit houses in Amsterdam from Endstra in March 2001, through the mediation of Willem Holleeder. Kelder claims that cadastre data showed that the apartments were sold well below market value: the apartments were sold for €374,369 each to Sijthoff.

=== Wikipedia ===
In November 2008, Sijthoff made the news because he did not want an article about him published on the Dutch Wikipedia. According to him the article contained "false and abusive" texts. He sued "the Vereniging Wikimedia Nederland" and "the Stichting Wikimedia Nederland" and demanded the publication of the particulars of the author of the article and that the article would be removed from the Dutch Wikipedia. He is the first Dutchman demanding through the court that his Wikipedia article be removed. Ruling on this case took place on 10 December 2008. The court rejected his request. The judge stated that he has sued the wrong entity. The legal responsibility for the content of the articles would not lie in the Netherlands, but with the American Wikimedia Foundation. According to the court, Sijthoffs lawyer did not make it sufficiently plausible that the Vereniging Wikimedia Nederland and the Stichting Wikimedia Nederland have control over the provision and content of the Dutch version of Wikipedia.

== Autosport ==
As a sportsman, Sijthoff races together with his son Diederik Sijthoff in the team of ACS Racing in the Dutch Supercar Challenge. The team drives a Marcos Mantis with starting number 241. In 2000, Sijthoff took part of the Dutch Toerwagen-kampioenschap in a Honda Integra on the Circuit Park Zandvoort together with his team mate Bert Ploeg with the team name BPR Honda.
