= Johann Georg van Caspel =

Dutch painter

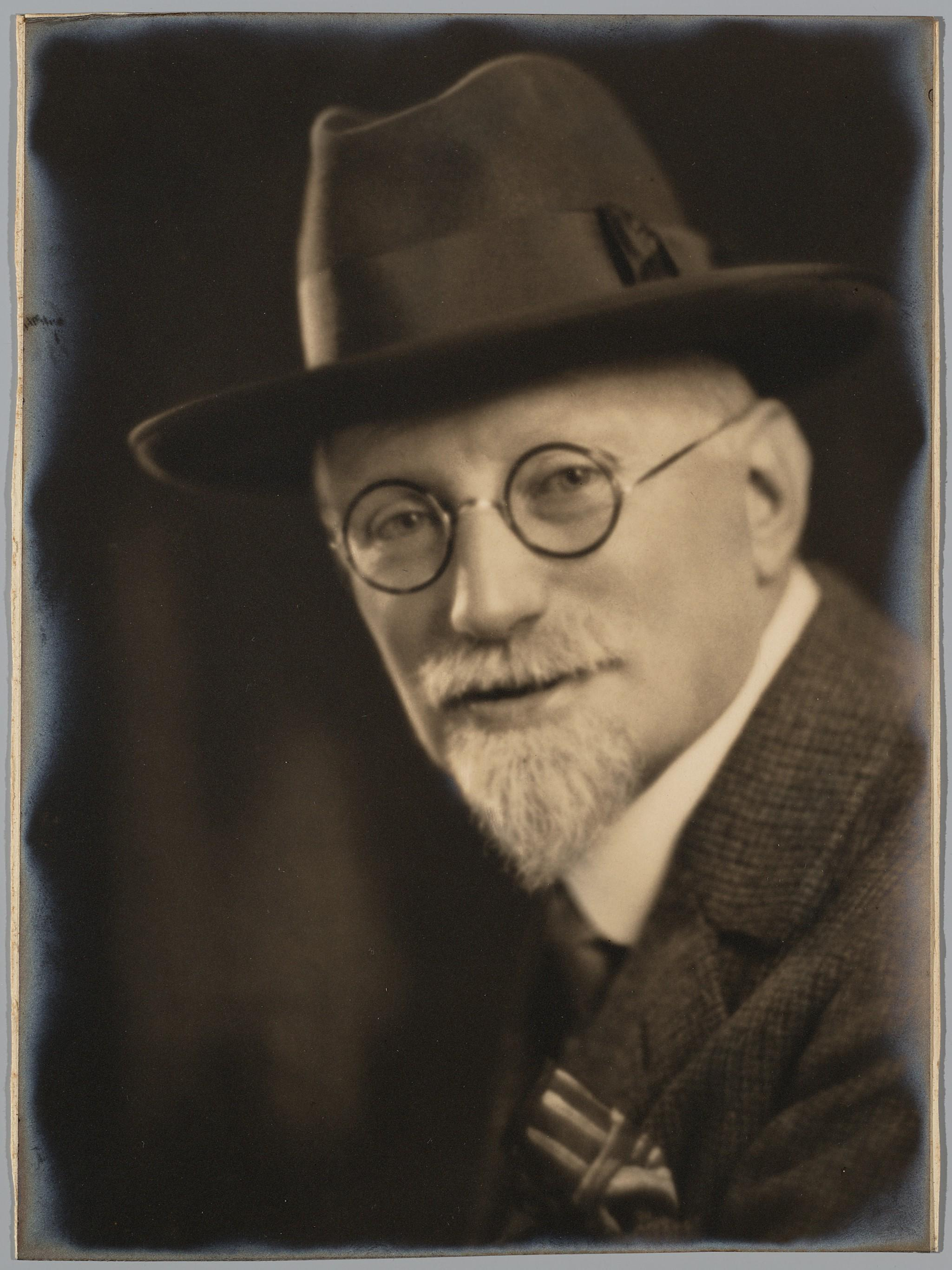
- Portrait (ca. 1920)
- Born: 24 March 1870; Amsterdam, Ootmarsum
- Died: 4 July 1928 (aged 58); Laren
- Occupation: Architect, graphic designer, painter, illustrator, exlibrist, decorative artist, furniture designer, drawer, lithographer, poster artist

Signature
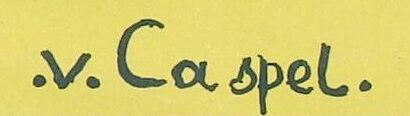

Johann Georg van Caspel (24 March 1870–4 July 1928) was a Dutch Art Nouveau colour lithographist, painter of portraits and murals, and architect.

== Biography ==
He studied at the Rijksakademie van beeldende kunsten, 'State Academy of Fine Arts' in Amsterdam. He started working at the studio of Maurits van der Valk, and made his poster artwork with the Amand Printing Company. Eventually he would move to Laren and start working in the field of architecture; designing mansions in the area of Gooi.

== Selected works ==
Poster Artwork

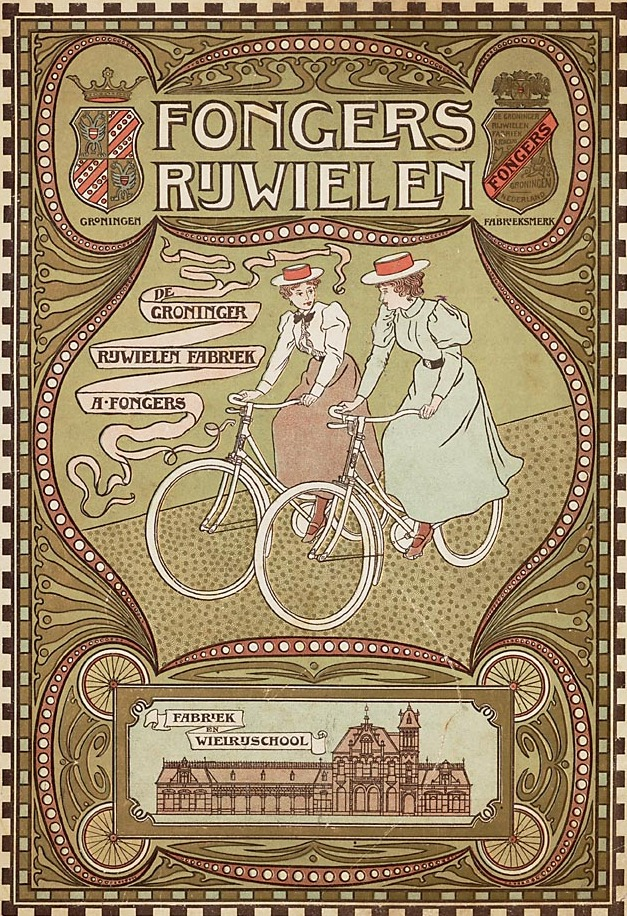
De Groninger rijwielenfabriek A. Fongers (1898)

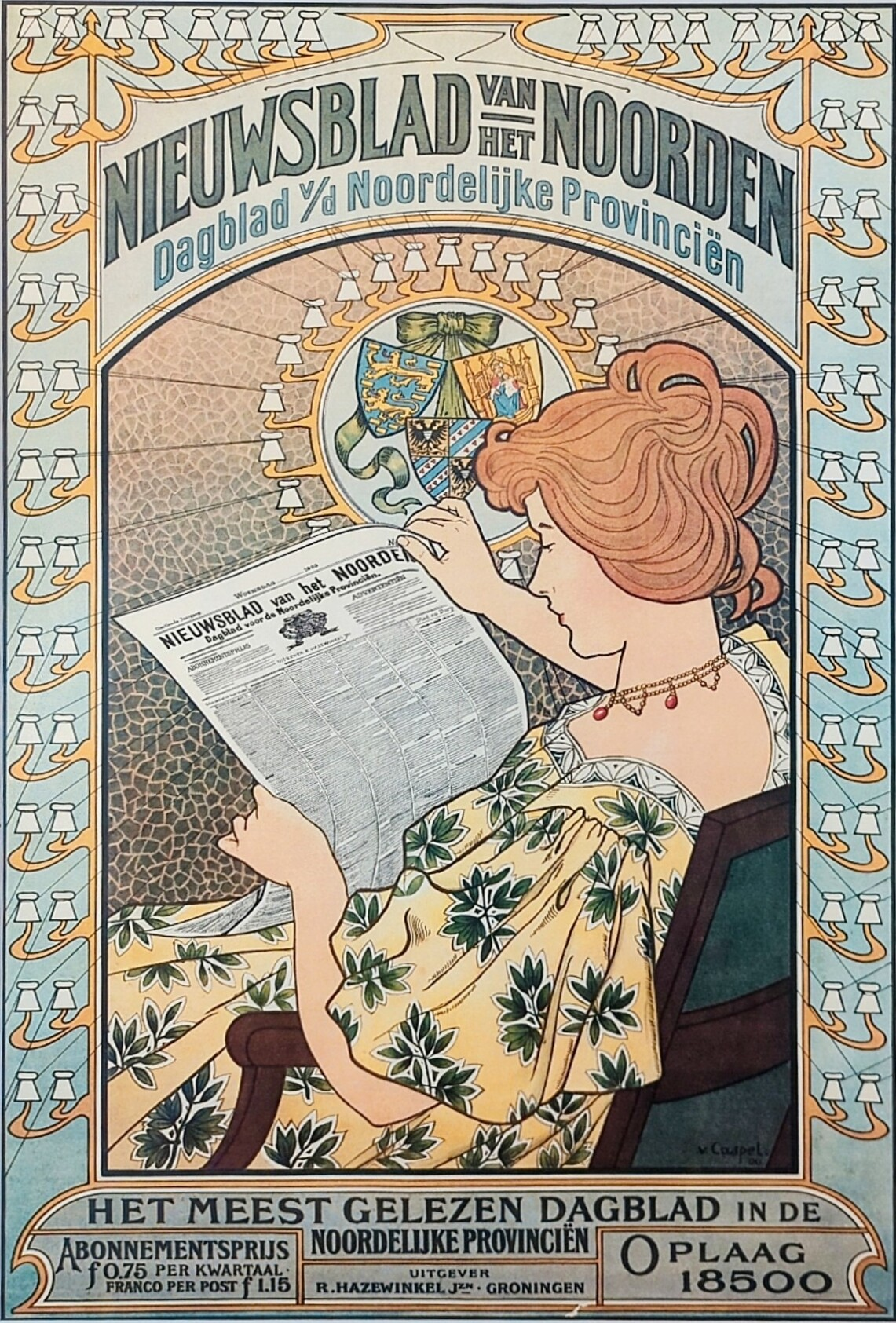
Nieuwsblad van het Noorden (1900)

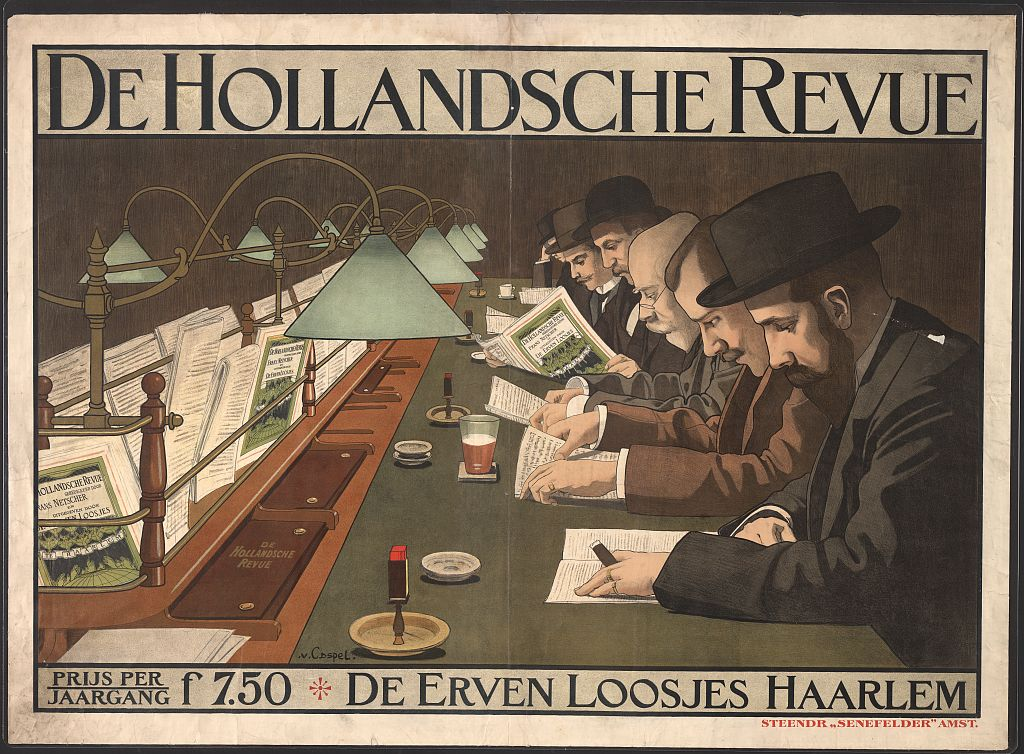
De Hollandsche Revue (1910)

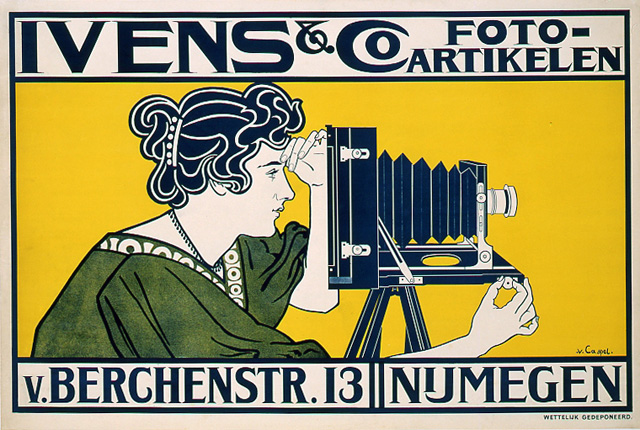
Ivens & Co. Foto-artikelen

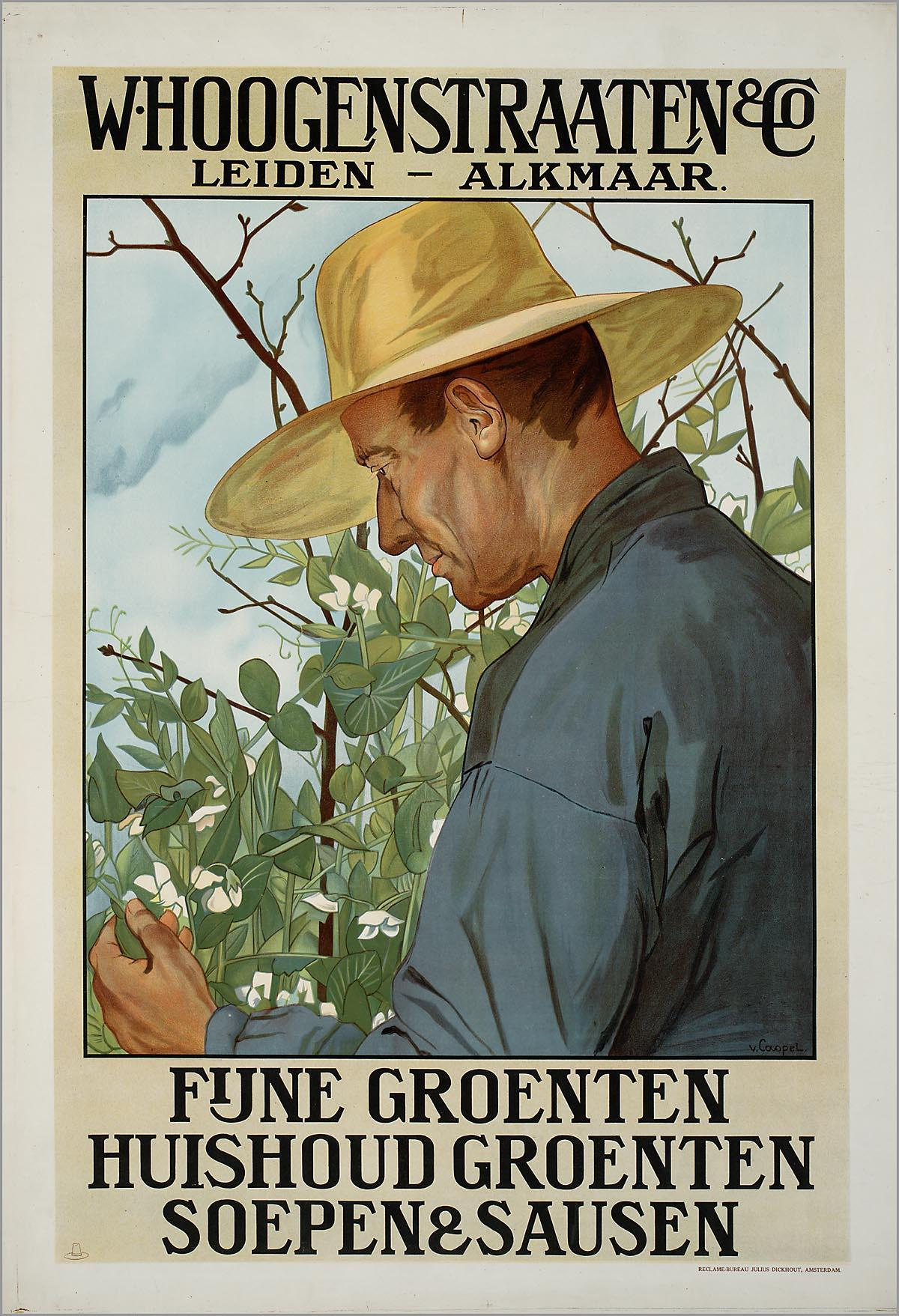
W. Hoogenstraaten & Co

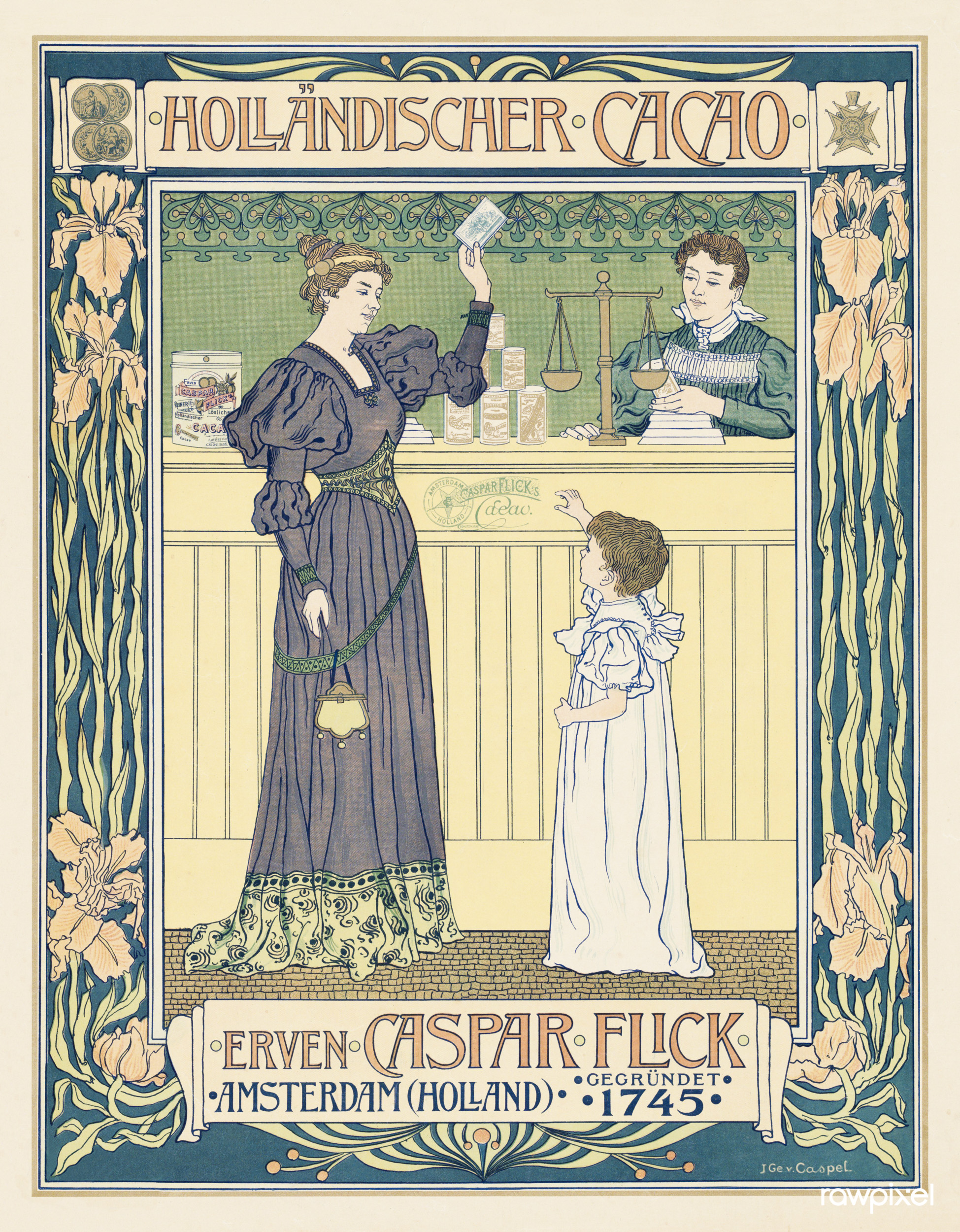
Höllandischer Cacao

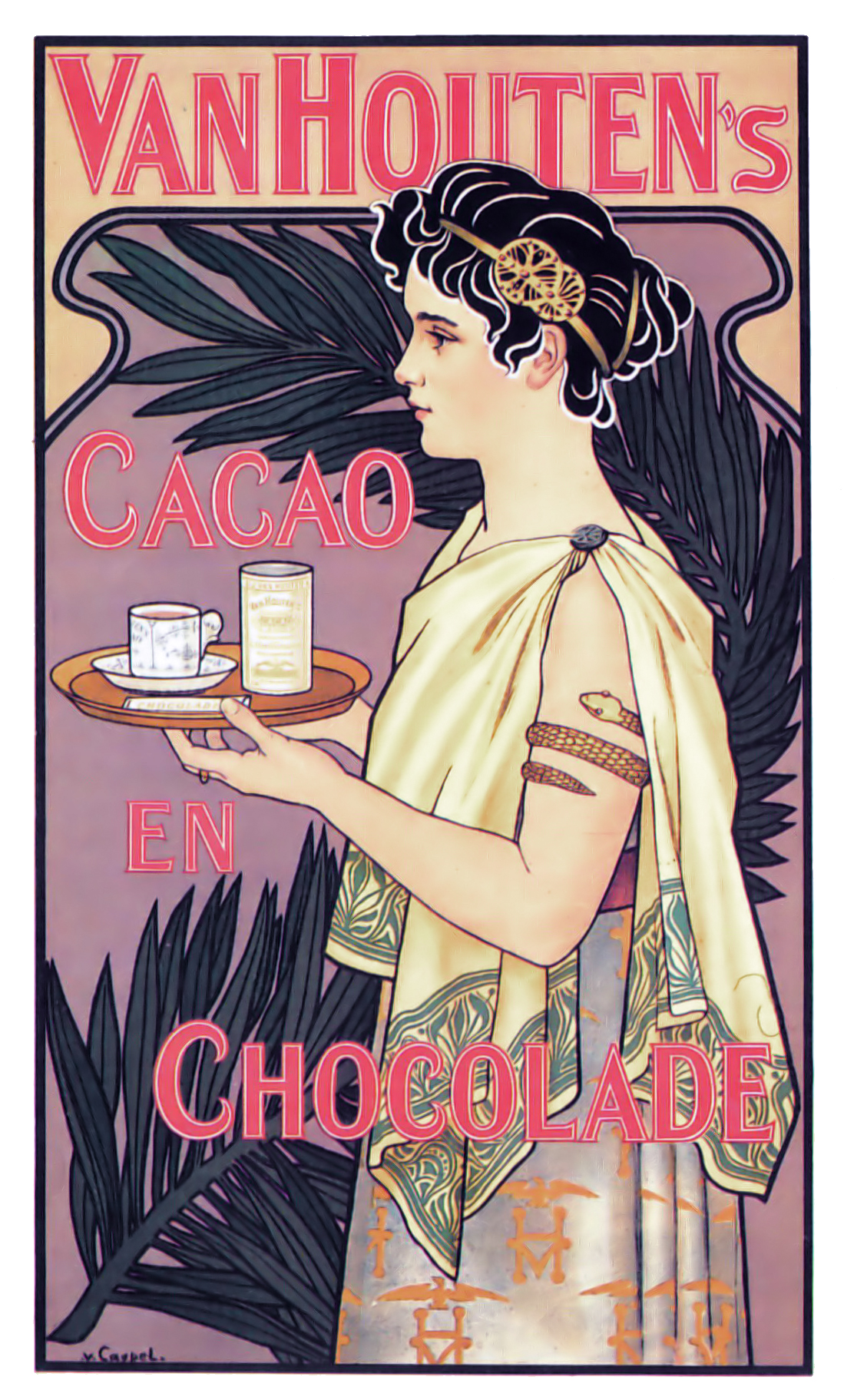
Van Houten's Cacao en Chocolade

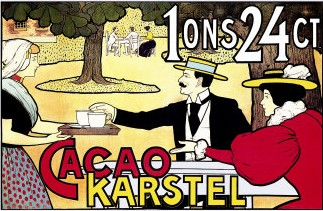
Karstel Cacao

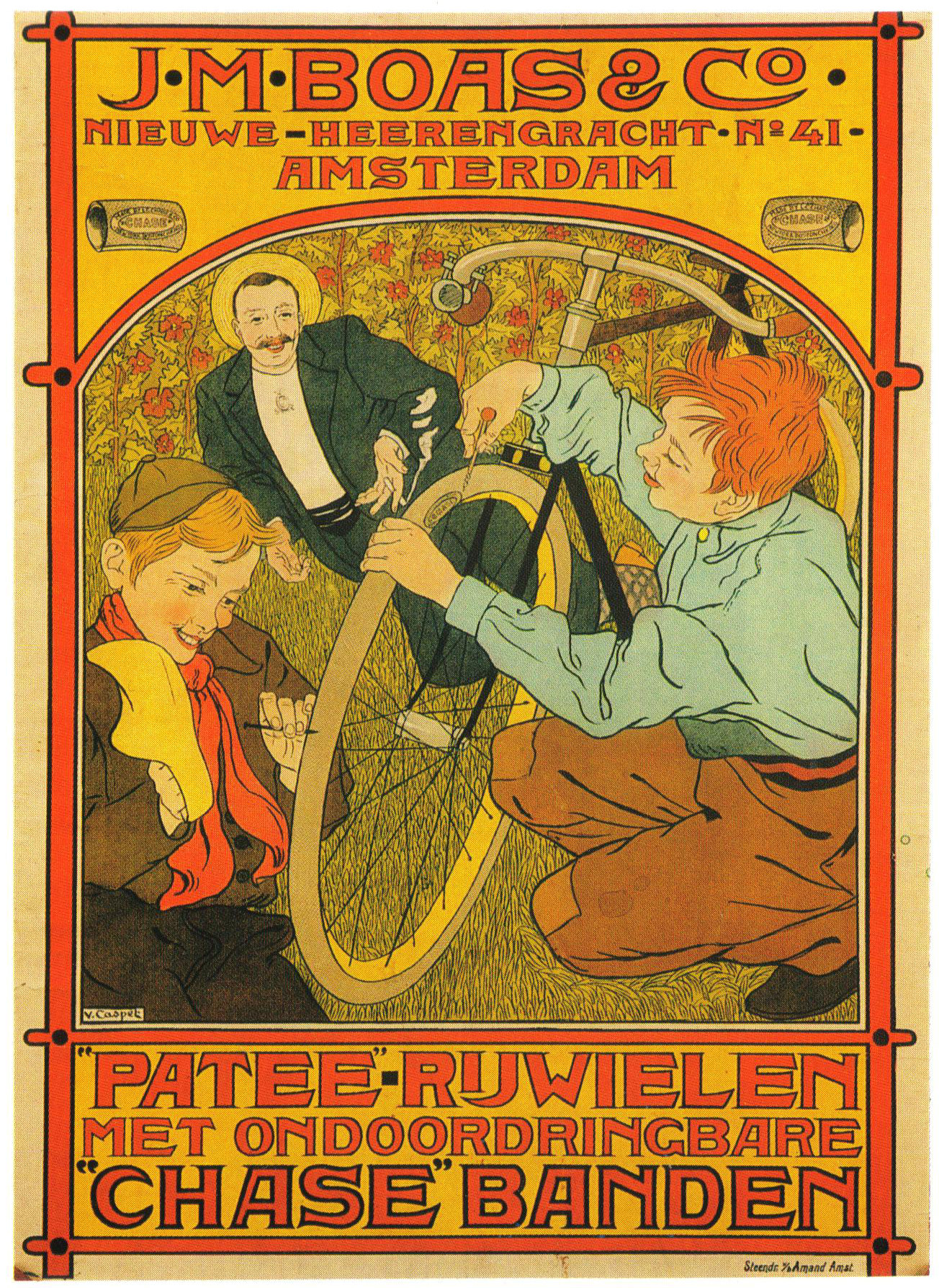
Patee Rijwielen

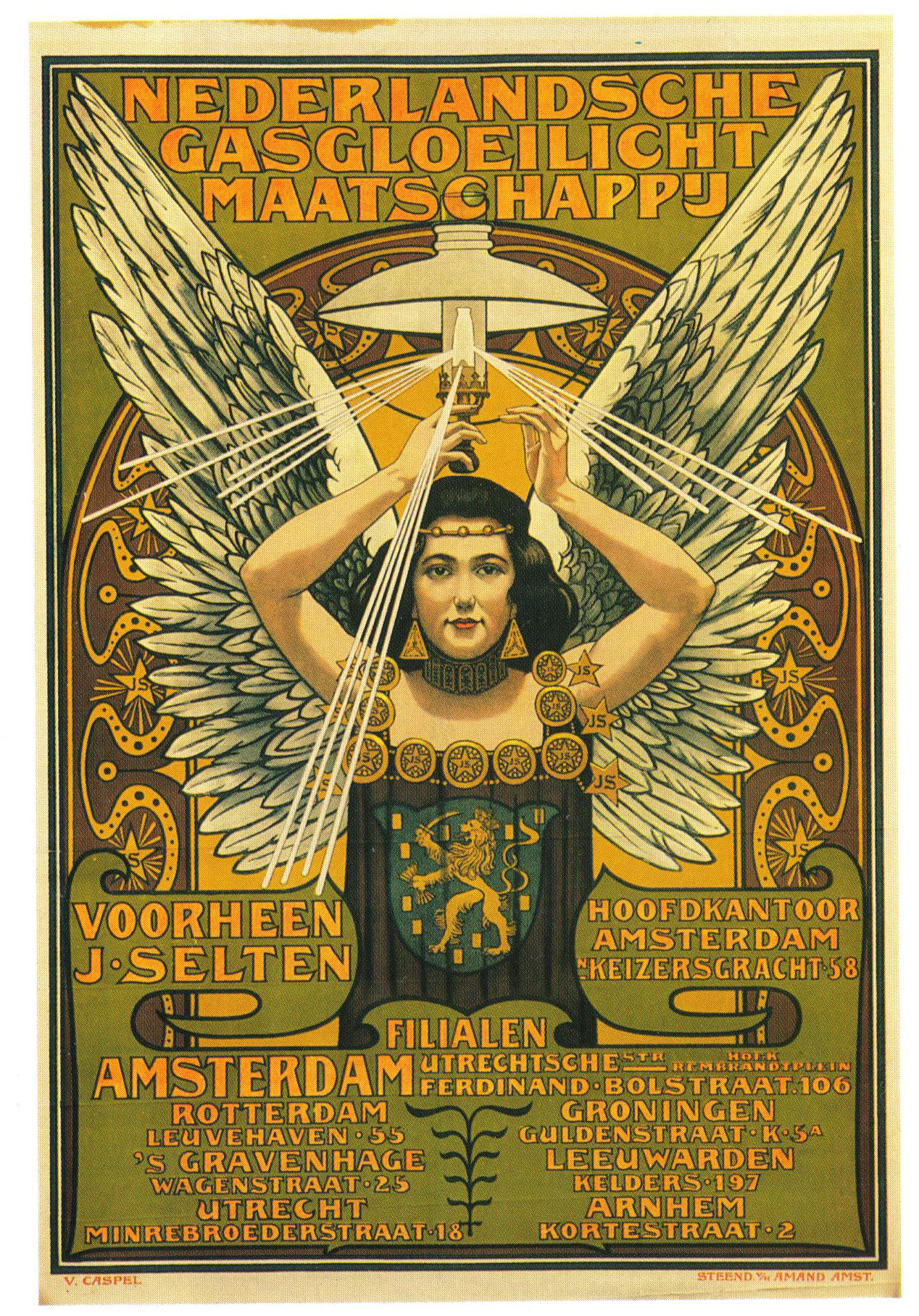
Nederlandse Gasgloeilicht Maatschappij

== See also ==
- Les Maitres de l'Affiche
