= Dichtbij.nl =

Now-defunct Dutch news platform

- Website: www.dichtbij.nl

Dichtbij.nl was a Dutch news portal delivering nationwide local news which began as a "citizen journalism website" by Bart Brouwers. It grew to become a "hyper-local news platform", and is owned by the Telegraaf Media Groep (TMG). Its chief editor was Bart Brouwers, formerly chief editor of the daily newspaper Sp!ts.

In November 2015, TMG announced a reorganization of the Dichtbij; it was to close some of its offices since in North-Holland, Leiden, Rotterdam, and Utrecht it had been operating at a loss for a number of years. Forty of sixty jobs were lost. The decision came at a time when TMG was already experiencing serious financial setbacks, as well as a conflict with the editorial boards of some of the local and regional newspapers it owns. The Dichtbij offices that were to be closed, in North and South Holland, already had strong coverage with regional TMG-owned papers; it would continue to operate from its Eindhoven office. In 2017 TMG closed Dichtbij.nl.
