= Aachener Zeitung =

German newspaper in Aachen

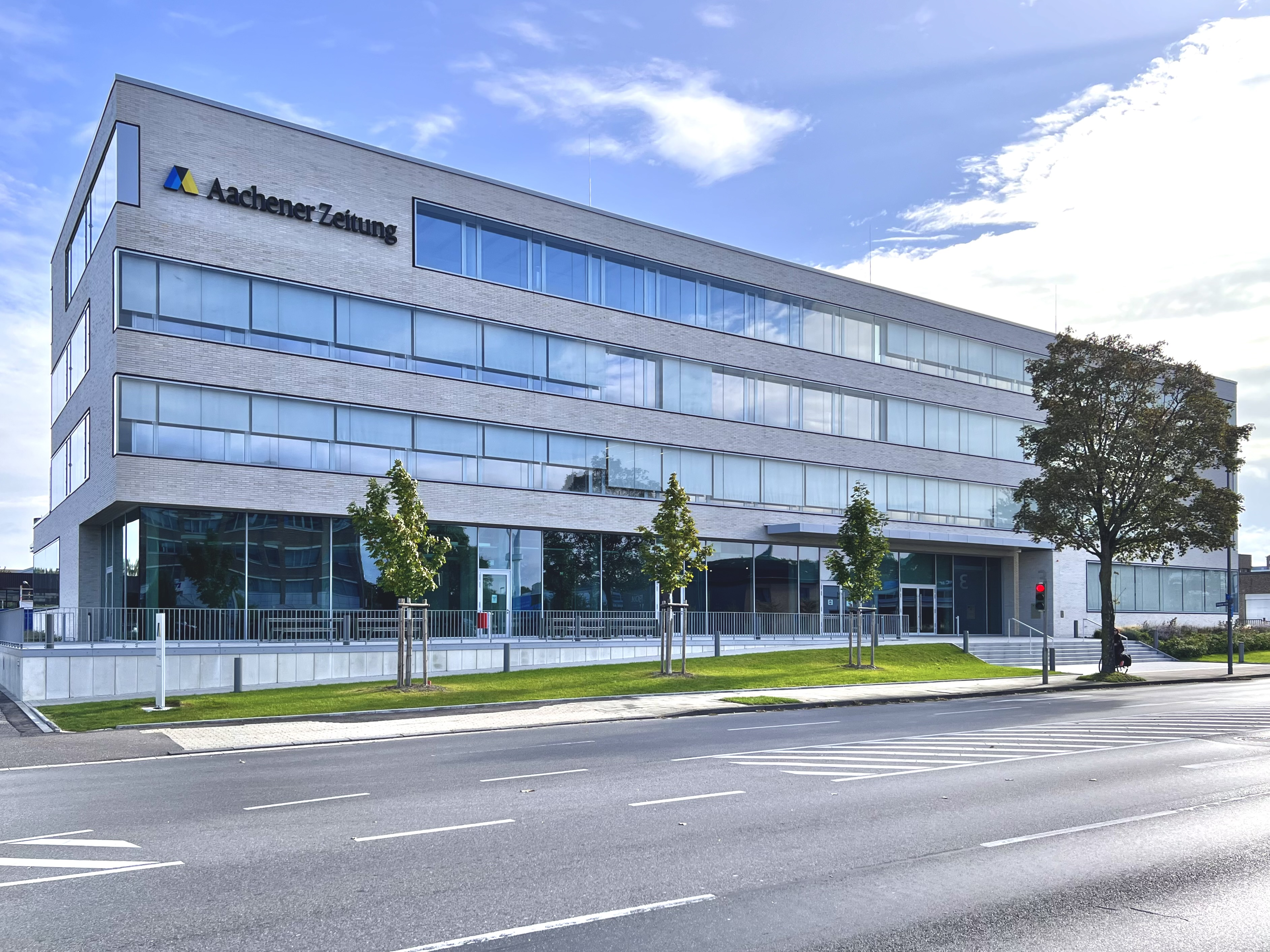
- Building of the Aachener Zeitungsverlag at the Dresdener Straße in Aachen
- Type: Daily newspaper
- Format: Rhenish
- Publisher: Mediahuis
- Editor-in-chief: Bernd Mathieu
- Founded: 1946
- Language: German
- Headquarters: Aachen
- Website: www.aachener-zeitung.de

Aachener Zeitung (German pronunciation: [ˈaːxənɐ ˈtsaɪtʊŋ]; transl. "Aachen Newspaper"; AZ) is a daily newspaper published in Aachen, Germany. It is printed, alongside the daily Aachener Nachrichten (AN), by Mediahuis in the Rhenish format.

== History ==
The AZ was founded in 1946 as Aachener Volkszeitung (AVZ) by Jakob Schmitz, Josef Hofmann, Albert Maas and Johannes Ernst, first printed on 22 February 1946. It was the first free paper published by Germans after World War II. The paper was renamed Aachener Zeitung on 6 March 1996. The paper was printed initially only two or three times a week, but daily every working day from 1 September 1949; it is sold mainly by subscription and the circulation is about 112,000 copies.

The paper supplies news from around the world, but with a focus on the region, its politics, economy, culture, sports and weather, for readers in Aachen, Eschweiler, Geilenkirchen and Jülich.

Bernd Mathieu is the current editor-in-chief, of the Aachener Zeitung from 1995 and of the Aachener Nachrichten from 2003. The concept of two newspapers in one Redaktion was then new for Germany. Mathieu is a lecturer at the Aachen University of Applied Sciences for Digital Business in media and communications studies. He is a member of the jury of the journalism prize Theodor Wolff Prize.

Mathieu initiated online news service, namely a digital daily evening news "AmAbend" with photo galleries and videos, provided from 7 pm, in addition to the printed papers which include weekly specials on Wednesdays and Sundays.

== Awards ==
- Theodor Wolff Prize 2007, Marlon Gego, Am Ende der Illusion
- European Newspaper Award, several times, including 2001, 2012 and 2016.
