= IJmuider Courant =

Dutch newspaper

- Type: Daily newspaper
- Publisher: Mediahuis
- Editor-in-chief: Hugo Schneider
- Founded: 1915
- Language: Dutch
- Headquarters: IJmuiden (regional), Alkmaar (central)
- Circulation: 5,500 (2014)
- Website: ijmuidercourant.nl

IJmuider Courant is a Dutch newspaper oriented towards the city of IJmuiden and surrounding region. The paper is published by Mediahuis and had a circulation of 5,500 copies in 2014.

== History ==
In January 1896 bookshop owner and publisher W.K. Nieborg from IJmuiden started the Gratis Advertentieblad voor IJmuiden, de Heide, Velsen en Omstreken (English: Free advert paper for IJmuiden, de Heide, Velsen and surroundings). In 1906 this paper was continued by P.F.C. Roelse, who added the subtitle IJmuider Courant. In September 1904 J. Sinjewel started the free paper Vraag en Aanbod (English: Supply and demand) in Oud-IJmuiden. Local notables proposed that Roelse and Sinjewel combine their papers, which lead to the foundation of the Uitgevers-Maatschappij IJmuiden NV (English: Publishing Company IJmuiden).

The first issue of the IJmuider Courant appeared on Saturday 4 December 1915, and was published on Wednesdays and Saturdays. The paper did well and soon had 2300 subscriptions. In 1923 Sinjewel died, and his widow continued the newspaper with the help of the family Allen. In late 1920s one of the editors started his own newspaper competing with the IJmuider Courant. Moreover, two papers from Haarlem started their own local newspapers. From 1926 to 1942 the Oprechte Haerlemsche Courant operated the Dagblad van IJmuiden (English: Daily paper of IJmuiden; 1926-1942), later known as Het dagblad voor Ĳmuiden - Velsen - Beverwĳk - Driehuis - Santpoort (English: Daily paper for Ĳmuiden - Velsen - Beverwĳk - Driehuis - Santpoort), and in 1931 Haarlems Dagblad started Het Nieuwe Avondblad (English: The New Evening paper). Competition between these two large newspapers from Haarlem would eventually ruin the IJmuider Courant.

On 13 May 1932 the IJmuider Courant was taken over by Haarlems Dagblad for 19,250 gulden. During World War II the IJmuider Courant was canceled on 16 October 1941 by order of the German occupation forces. After the war it started publishing again in 1946. On 2 May 1942 the mother newspaper Haarlems Dagblad was forced by the Germans to merge with its competitor the Opregte Haarlemsche Courant and continued as Haarlemsche Courant. On 25 June 1945 the joined newspapers restarted under the name Haarlems Dagblad. From 1949 Haarlems Dagblad and IJmuider Courant became part of Damiate publishing, which also owned several other newspapers. On 20 December 1991 Damiate fused with Verenigde Noordhollandse Dagbladen (VND), the publisher of Noordhollands Dagblad, under the name Hollandse Dagbladcombinatie (HDC Media), and later renamed to Holland Media Combinatie. In April 1993 HDC Media was taken over by Telegraaf Media Groep.

On 15 June 1984 the IJmuider Courant published the results of the European Parliament election for the municipality of Velsen, despite being forbidden, by posting a journalist at every polling place and using the Dutch law which states that election results are counted publicly.

On 19 April 2004 the IJmuider Courant switched from being distributed in the afternoon to the morning. In 2013 the size of HDC Media newspapers was changed from broadsheet to tabloid format.

== Organisation ==
IJmuider Courant is part of a local cooperation with Haarlems Dagblad, which is published in three editions: Haarlems Dagblad, IJmuider Courant and Haarlems Dagblad editie Haarlemmermeer. The IJmuider Courant is distributed in Velsen, Driehuis, Santpoort-Noord, Velserbroek, Velsen-Zuid, IJmuiden, Velsen-Noord and Santpoort-Zuid.

HDC Media operated about 150 journalists out of which more than half works in regional centres and the rest at the headquarters in Alkmaar. A further 210 people take care of administration and advertisement. In 2014 chief editor for the IJmuider Courant was Ies van Rij.Ies van Rij Chief editors for the general information in HDC newspapers were Peter Hovestad, Hugo Schneider and Gerben van ´t Hek. In 2018 Hugo Schneider is the chief editor. In recent years, staff and circulation are dwindling.

== Literature ==
- (in Dutch) Plasse J. van de, Verbei W., Kroniek van de Nederlandse dagblad- en opiniepers, Otto Cramwinckel Uitgever, 2005, ISBN 9789075727777
- (in Dutch) Es, C. van, Bles voor de Kop, Geschiedenis en volksleven van IJmuiden, Vermande, 1970, ISBN 906040373-8
- (in Dutch) Roos, J. de, 100 jaar Haarlems Dagblad, Damiate, 1987, ISBN 9789090016276
- (in Dutch) Vries, T. de, Schaap D., Rolle S., Eene plaats van grooten omvang. 1876-1976, honderd jaar IJmuiden en het Noordzeekanaal, Vermande 1976, ISBN 9060404475
