= Friesch Dagblad =

Dutch newspaper

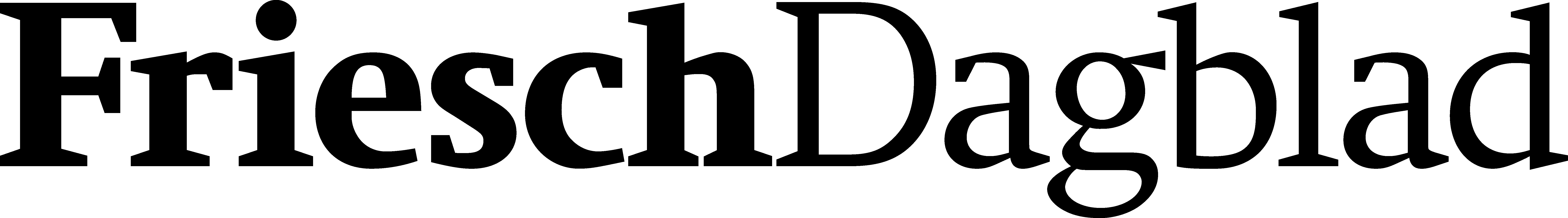
- Type: Daily newspaper
- Owner: Mediahuis
- Editor: Ria Kraa
- Founded: 1 July 1903
- Political alignment: Christian
- Headquarters: Leeuwarden, Netherlands
- Circulation: 9,300 (2021)
- Website: frieschdagblad.nl

The Friesch Dagblad (Dutch pronunciation: [friz ˈdɑɣblɑt]; the first word is spelled Fries in modern Dutch) is a Dutch daily newspaper founded in 1903. It covers the region of Friesland with news reports written from a protestant perspective. Friesch Dagblad and its competitor, Leeuwarder Courant, are owned by the Mediahuis. Both newspapers publish most of the content in Dutch, with only about 5% of content in West Frisian.
