= Villa Waldberta =

Lake villa and artists' residence for the city of Munich

Coordinates: 47.9442°N 11.2939°E

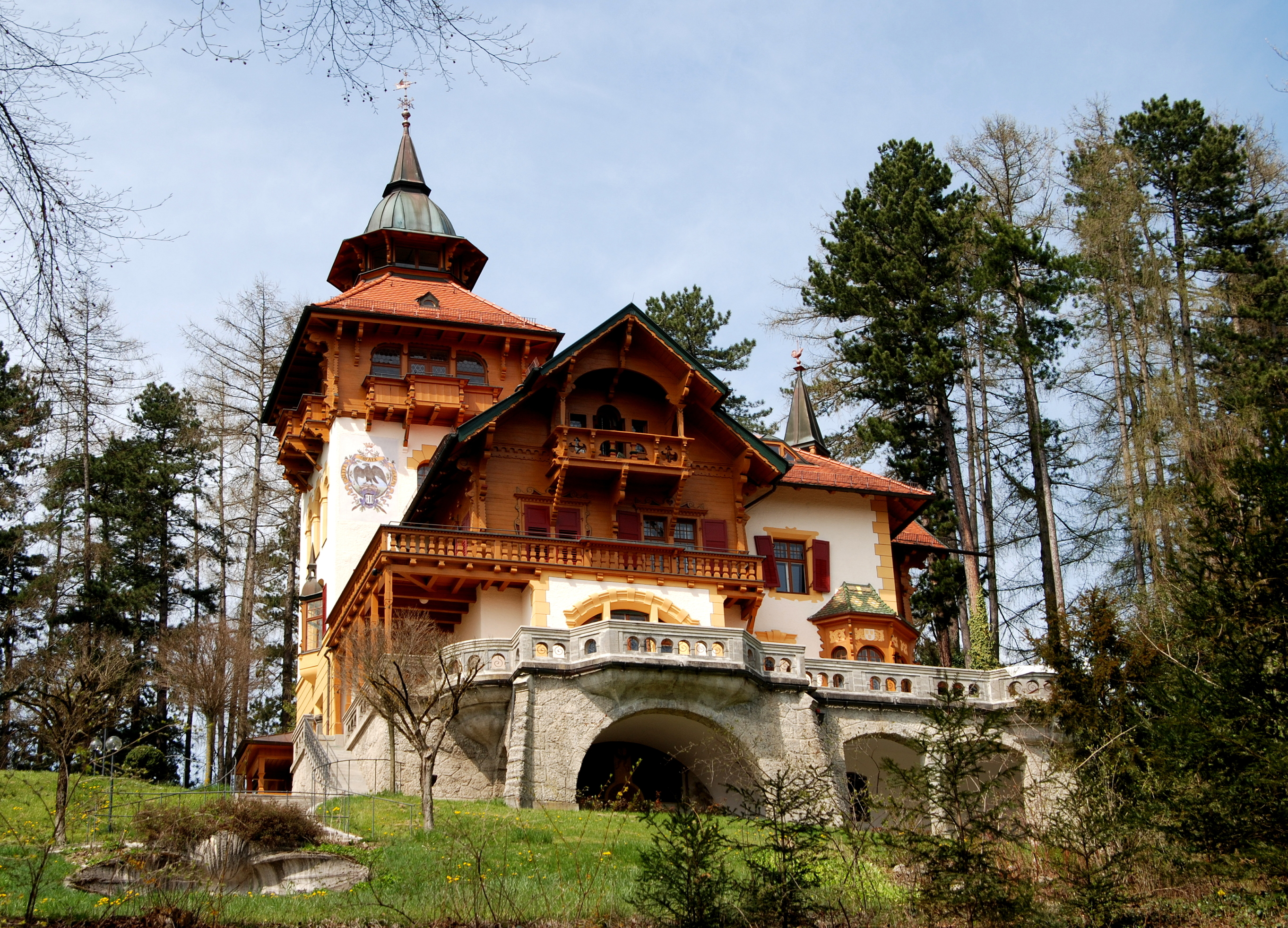
Villa Waldberta, Feldafing

Villa Waldberta Artists Residence (German: Künstlervilla Waldberta) is a historic estate in Feldafing, Bavaria, Germany. The villa, along with Ebenböckhaus in Pasing, accommodates the city of Munich's Artist-in-Residence program. Villa Waldberta was completed in 1902 in the historicist style.

== History ==
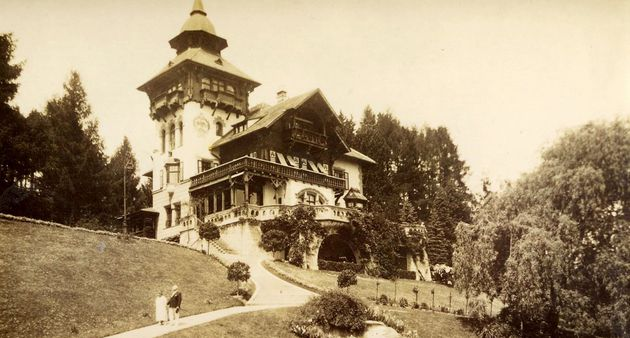
Villa Waldberta, circa 1910

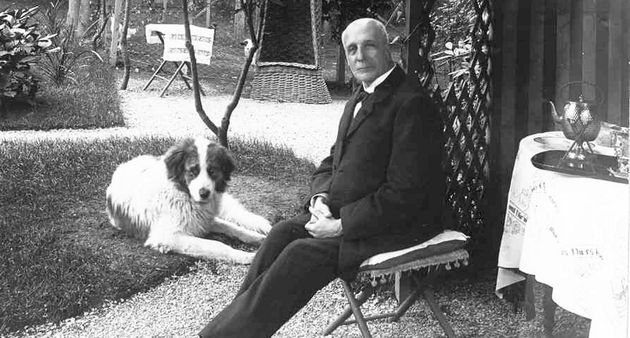
Albertus Willem Sijthoff at Villa Waldberta, circa 1910

Designed by architect Baierle, Villa Felsenheim was constructed in 1901–2 by Heilmann & Littmann on behalf of banker and writer Bernhard Wilhelm Schuler. Schuler sold it the following year to Dutch publisher Albertus Willem Sijthoff, who redesigned the 22,000 m^{2} (5.4-acre) park and renamed it Waldbert, in honor of his wife, Waldina.

Dresden art collector Carl Hugo Smeil purchased the property in 1917; in 1925, it was sold to German-American doctor Franz Koempel and his wife, Bertha, who renamed it Waldberta to reflect her name. The Koempels returned to America in 1939 at the outbreak of World War II. In 1942, the Nazis declared the villa "enemy property" and used it as a military hospital. The villa was confiscated by the U.S. Army in 1945 and it was used to house displaced persons and Holocaust survivors; between 50 and 70 people were living there through the early 1950s.

In 1953, Villa Waldberta was returned to its now-widowed owner Bertha Koempel, who used it as a summer home until her death in 1966. She bequeathed the villa to the city of Munich, in order to "promote art and culture while maintaining the character of the property as a monument to past and present."

From 1966 to 1973, the city of Munich rented the villa to Willi Daume in preparation for the 1972 Summer Olympic Games. During the Games, Willy Brandt resided in the villa and hosted dignitaries such as Henry Kissinger, Edward Heath, and Georges Pompidou. From 1974 to 1982, Villa Waldberta was used by a Montessori educational association for seminars and retreats.

== Modern use ==
The city of Munich has sponsored the villa, located on Lake Starnberg, as an artists' residence since 1983. The residency program was revamped in 2004, when a new director, Karin Sommer, expanded the scope to artists contributing to projects by the city of Munich. The villa contains six furnished apartments and two studios available for two- to three-month residencies, for a variety of artists, including musicians, painters, photographers, poets, sculptors, and filmmakers.

The program relies on partnership with museums as well as organizations such as the Goethe Institute and the Institut Français.

Villa Waldberta has been offered as a residence to persecuted authors through PEN Centre Germany's Writers in Exile program. The Belarusian poet Volha Hapeyeva was in residency there in 2020.
