= Nieuwsblad van het Noorden =

Dutch newspaper

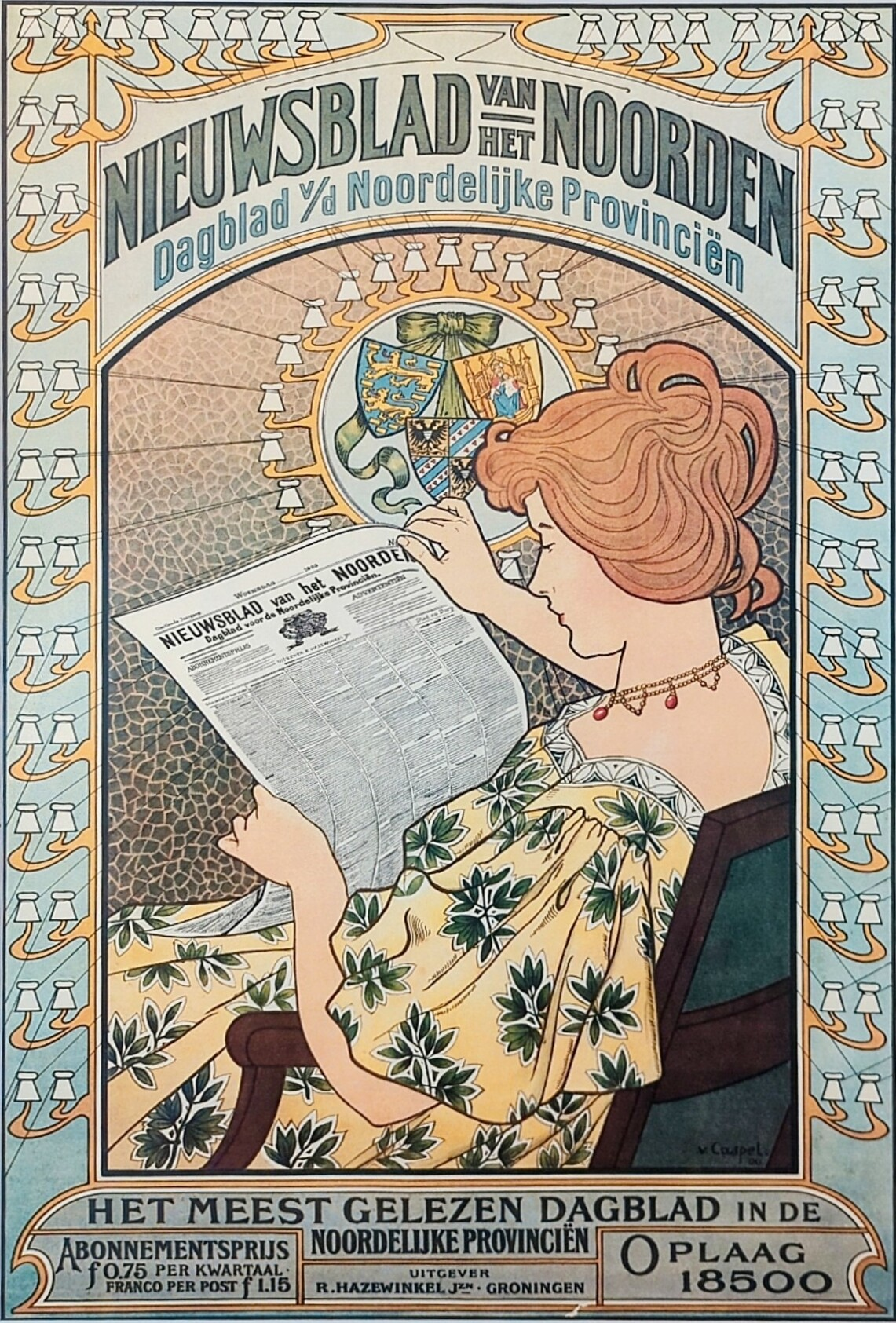
- Poster of Nieuwsblad van het Noorden by Johann Georg van Caspel (1900)
- Type: Daily newspaper
- Format: Broadsheet
- Succeeded by: Dagblad van het Noorden
- Founded: 2 June 1888
- Ceased publication: 2 April 2002
- Language: Dutch
- Headquarters: Groningen, Netherlands
- Country: Netherlands

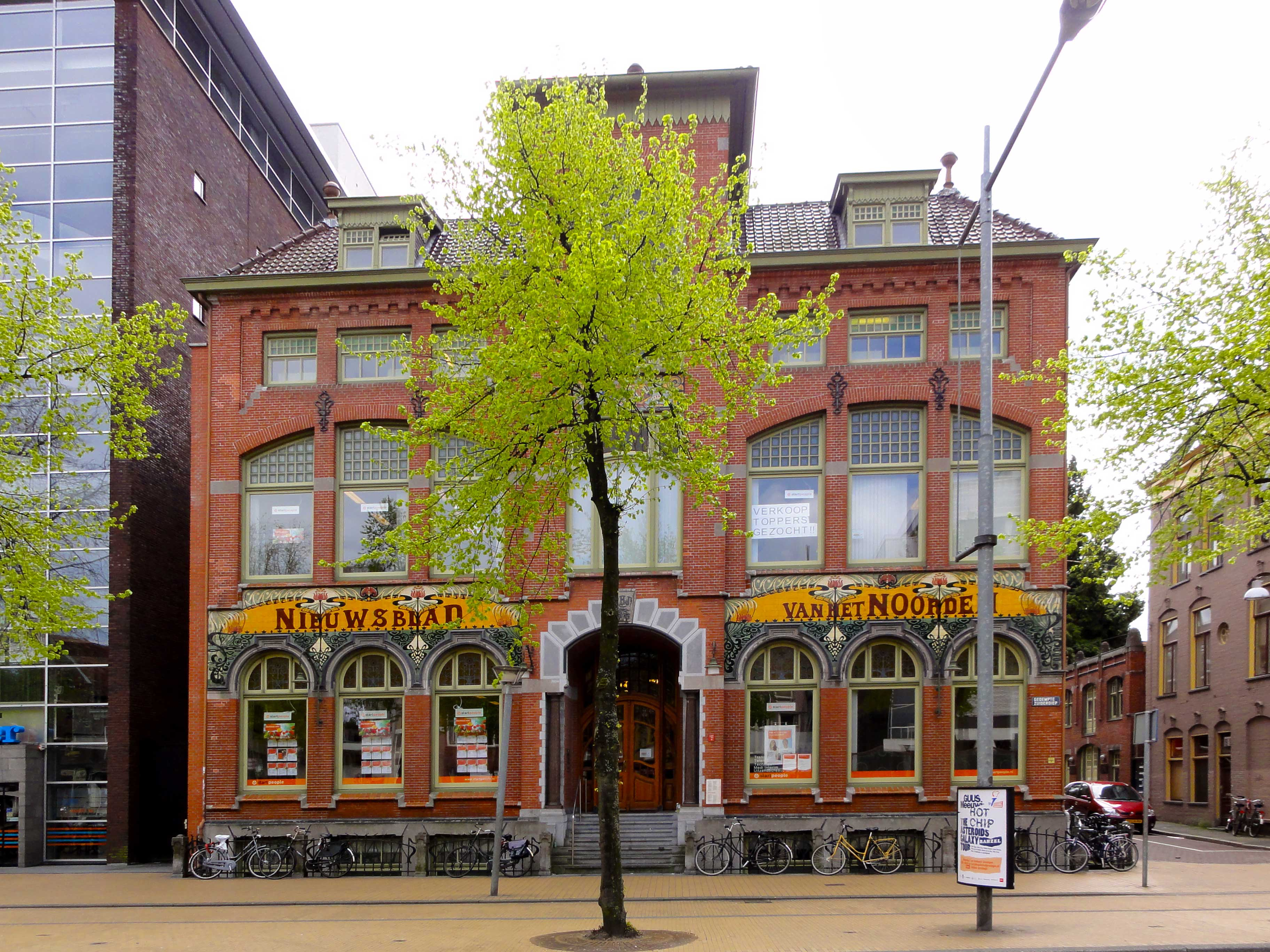
Former building of the newspaper in the city of Groningen

The Nieuwsblad van het Noorden (Dutch pronunciation: [ˈniuzblɑt fɑn ət ˈnoːrdə(n)]; (Note: In isolation, van is pronounced [vɑn].) "Newspaper of the North") is a former regional daily newspaper from the city of Groningen in the Netherlands. It was published from 1888 to 2002, when it was merged with the Groninger Dagblad and the Drentse Courant into the Dagblad van het Noorden, which published its first edition on 2 April 2002.

== History ==
The first issue of the Nieuwsblad van het Noorden appeared on 2 June 1888. Until 1997 its offices were in a 1903 Jugendstil building in the Gedempte Zuiderdiep designed by Gerrit Nijhuis.

During the German occupation in World War II, the Nieuwsblad van het Noorden, like many other Dutch newspapers, published antisemitic and pro-German articles. In 1944 they refused to hire a chief editor who was a member of the Dutch National Socialist Movement—at the time the only legal party in the Netherlands—and publication of the newspaper was suspended. The paper reappeared on 26 January 1946, some time after the liberation of the Netherlands, with a circulation of 35,000 copies.

The Nieuwsblad van het Noorden came under criticism in 2000 with the publication of Het Schandaal ('The Scandal') by Johan van Gelder, which threw new light on the newspaper's relationship with the German occupiers. The revelations in the book were in stark contrast to the representations of the two owners, the brothers Nico and Jan Abraham Hazewinkel.

From 2 April 2002 the newspaper was succeeded by the Dagblad van het Noorden, a fusion with the Groninger Dagblad and the Drentse Courant, which had previously been publishing together. All were published at that time by Hazewinkel Pers (Press). The Nieuwsblad van het Noorden published at midday; the other two were morning papers, as is the Dagblad van het Noorden.
