= Leeuwarder Courant =

Dutch newspaper

Coordinates: 53°11′48″N 5°48′05″E

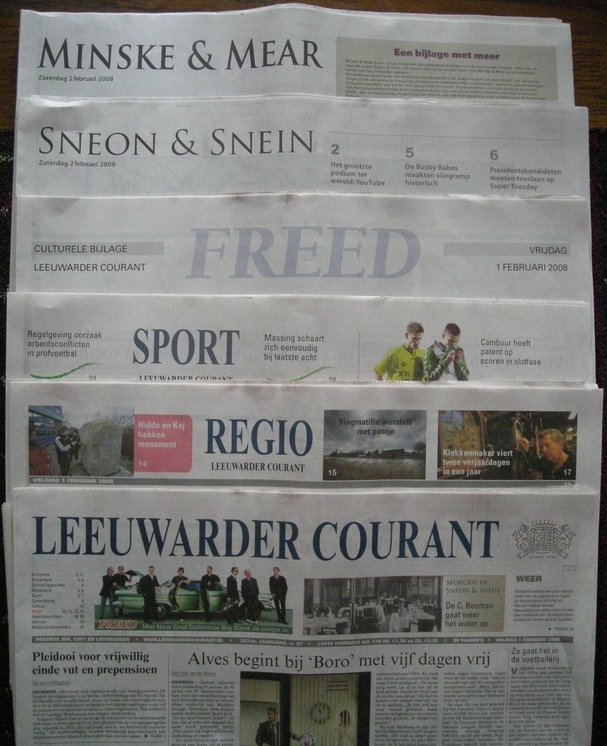
- Leeuwarder Courant, front page and sections
- Type: Daily newspaper
- Owner: Mediahuis
- Founded: 1752; 274 years ago
- Political alignment: Centrist
- Headquarters: Leeuwarden, Netherlands
- Website: lc.nl

The Leeuwarder Courant is the oldest daily newspaper in the Netherlands. Founded by Abraham Ferwerda, it first appeared in 1752. The Leeuwarder Courant was the first paper in the Dutch province Friesland and its capital Leeuwarden. It is considered a "popular" (as opposed to "quality") newspaper.

== History ==
Abraham Ferwerda was a printer and publisher in Leeuwarden, who first published the Leeuwarder Courant on 29 July 1752, and reportedly made a fortune publishing his paper. From the beginning, the intention was to produce a politically neutral paper which would gain revenue from objectively reporting news; until well into the nineteenth century the paper maintained its rather bland image. A conscious choice was also to focus on mercantile and international news, rather than report on too many local issues which might cause controversy with the local and national governments. In fact, during the latter part of the eighteenth century (the period which saw the decline of the Dutch Republic) the paper was criticized for its lack of patriotism. For a long time it was the only medium for advertisements in the region, which helped ensure its commercial success, and until 1842 it was the only serious newspaper in Friesland.

After Ferwerda's death, his son-in-law, Doeke Ritske Smeding, took over and guided the paper though the French occupation of the early nineteenth century (during which many Dutch papers were shut down by the occupier). Smeding died in 1814; Pieter Koumans Smeding, his nephew, ran the paper until 1854. His heirs owned the newspaper until 1947.

In 2013 Leeuwarder Courant was awarded the European Newspaper of the Year in the category of regional newspapers.

== Contents ==
While initially publishing mainly business and international news, in the nineteenth century the paper improved in quality and layout, and began publishing more news and stories related to Friesland. Important in this respect was the column "Mengelwerk," a kind of Frisian miscellany, which was published every Tuesday starting February 2, 1830, and included anecdotes and stories, and usually Frisian matters. Most of these anecdotes were written in Dutch, though the occasional West Frisian entry was printed.

In the early to mid nineteenth century, the Leeuwarder Courant began to publish literary reviews. Jacob van Leeuwen (1787–1857) and Wopke Eekhoff (1809–1880) wrote most of the reviews, in most cases without a byline, and in one case Eekhoff recommended a poetry collection he had written himself. The literary criticism in the Leeuwarder Courant is especially significant since its readership was to be found in the upper circles of Frisian society—the bookbuying public, the notables who were greatly interested in matters of language, literature, and culture, and helped determine their society's tastes and predilections. Additionally, it is the only source of theoretical observations about contemporary Frisian literature. From 1830 to 1848, for instance, it published 140 literary reviews, most by Frisian authors, and 46 articles on literary topics, sixteen of which on Frisian authors (twelve out of those sixteen on authors who wrote before 1800): the literary reviews and articles provide valuable insight in West Frisian (and Dutch) literature and contemporary attitudes toward the literary past.

Only some of the content of "Mengelwerk" was in West Frisian, and today still the paper publishes mostly articles written in Dutch; it was estimated that only around 5% of its content (and that of its main competitor, the Friesch Dagblad) is in West Frisian.

== Bibliography ==
=== Studies of the paper ===
- Broersma, Marcel (2002). Beschaafde vooruitgang: De wereld van de Leeuwarder Courant, 1752-2002. Leeuwarden.
- Broersma, Marcel; Gitte Brugman (2002). De Nieuste Tydingen. Leeuwarder Courant 250 Jaar. Leeuwarden.

=== 200th anniversary publication ===
- Witsen Elias, J.W.J.; Jan Piebenga (1952). Twee eeuwen Leeuwarder Courant. Stichting Leeuwarder Courant.
