= Algemeen Dagblad =

Dutch newspaper

- Publisher: DPG Media
- Editor-in-chief: Rennie Rijpma
- Founded: 1946; 80 years ago
- Language: Dutch
- Headquarters: Rotterdam
- Website: www.ad.nl

The Algemeen Dagblad (Dutch pronunciation: [ˈɑlɣəmeːn ˈdɑɣblɑt]; lit. 'General Daily Paper'), also known by its initialism AD ([aːˈdeː]), is a Dutch daily newspaper based in Rotterdam.

== History and profile ==
Founded in 1946, Algemeen Dagblad is published in tabloid format and headquartered in Rotterdam. Its regional focus includes the cities and regions around Rotterdam, Utrecht and The Hague. In South Holland and Utrecht, it is published and distributed with local dailies. The national edition is for sale in every city in the Netherlands and distributed throughout the rest of the country. AD is owned and published by DPG Media, known as De Persgroep until 2019 and previously PCM Uitgevers.

Algemeen Dagblad includes a regional supplement in the districts previously served by these regional papers. Two of them, the AD Haagsche Courant (for The Hague region) and the AD Rotterdams Dagblad (for the Rotterdam region) appear in both a morning and an evening edition.

- Rotterdams Dagblad → AD Rotterdams Dagblad
- Goudsche Courant → AD Groene Hart
- Rijn & Gouwe → AD Groene Hart
- Haagsche Courant → AD Haagsche Courant
- Utrechts Nieuwsblad → AD Utrechts Nieuwsblad
- Amersfoortsche Courant → AD Amersfoortsche Courant
- De Dordtenaar → AD De Dordtenaar
- Dagblad Rivierenland → AD Rivierenland

=== Chief editors ===
Chief editor	Service
Jan Schraver	1946–1947
G.N. Leenders	1947–1949
G.A.W. Zalsman	1949–1950
Jacques Ratté	1950–1958
Anton van der Vet	1958–1968
Huibert Nicolaas Appel	1968–1974
Ron Abram & Karel Giel	1975–1980
Ron Abram	1980–1993
Peter van Dijk	1993–2000
Oscar Garschagen	2000–2003
Willem Ammerlaan	2003–2004
Jan Bonjer	2004–2009
Peter de Jonge	2009–2010
Christiaan Ruesink	2010–2016
Hans Nijenhuis	2016–2021
Rennie Rijpma	Since 2021

=== Het Vaderland ===
Het Vaderland was an independent newspaper founded in the Hague in 1869. In 1972, it became a regional supplement of Algemeen Dagblad for The Hague. In 1982, the newspaper was dissolved.

== Circulation ==
In the period of 1995–96, Algemeen Dagblad had a circulation of 401,000 copies, making it the second best-selling paper in the Netherlands. In 2001, its circulation was 335,000 copies. In 2013, the paper was the second largest paid newspaper of the Netherlands after De Telegraaf. After a merger with seven regional newspapers on 1 September 2005 and ongoing reduction in readership, it had an average circulation merger of 365,912 copies in 2014. In 2017, it was down to 341,249 copies.
