= 3201 Sijthoff =

Main-belt asteroid

Discovery
- Discovered by: C. J. van Houten; I. van Houten-G. T. Gehrels
- Discovery site: Palomar Obs.
- Discovery date: 24 September 1960

Designations
- Named after: Albert Georg Sijthoff (Dutch publisher)
- Alternative designations: 6560 P-L · 1969 FE; 1979 DP
- Minor planet category: main-belt · (inner) background · Flora

Orbital characteristics
- Epoch 23 March 2018 (JD 2458200.5)
- Uncertainty parameter 0
- Observation arc: 62.45 yr (22,809 d)
- Aphelion: 2.4553 AU
- Perihelion: 2.0605 AU
- Semi-major axis: 2.2579 AU
- Eccentricity: 0.0874
- Orbital period (sidereal): 3.39 yr (1,239 d)
- Mean anomaly: 179.37°
- Mean motion: 0° 17^{m} 25.8^{s} / day
- Inclination: 2.9903°
- Longitude of ascending node: 109.47°
- Argument of perihelion: 53.275°

Physical characteristics
- Mean diameter: 5.030±0.053 km 5.205±0.042 km 5.41 km (calculated)
- Synodic rotation period: 4.607±0.0016 h
- Geometric albedo: 0.2164±0.0355; 0.231±0.047; 0.24 (assumed)
- Spectral type: S (assumed)
- Absolute magnitude (H): 13.5; 13.62±0.41; 13.7; 14.158±0.004 (S)

3201 Sijthoff, provisional designation 6560 P-L, is a background or Florian asteroid from the inner regions of the asteroid belt, approximately 5 kilometers (3.1 miles) in diameter. It was discovered during the Palomar–Leiden survey on 24 September 1960, by Ingrid and Cornelis van Houten at Leiden, and Tom Gehrels at Palomar Observatory in California, United States. The assumed S-type asteroid has a rotation period of 4.607 hours. It was named after Dutch publisher and popularizer of astronomy, Albert Georg Sijthoff.

== Orbit and classification ==
Sijthoff is a non-family asteroid of the main belt's background population when applying the hierarchical clustering method to its proper orbital elements. Based on osculating Keplerian orbital elements, the asteroid has also been classified as a member of the Flora family (402), a giant asteroid family and the largest family of stony asteroids in the main-belt.

It orbits the Sun in the inner asteroid belt at a distance of 2.1–2.5 AU once every 3 years and 5 months (1,239 days; semi-major axis of 2.26 AU). Its orbit has an eccentricity of 0.09 and an inclination of 3° with respect to the ecliptic. The body's observation arc begins with a precovery taken at Palomar in December 1954, nearly 6 years prior to its official discovery observation.

=== Palomar–Leiden survey ===
The survey designation "P-L" stands for Palomar–Leiden, named after Palomar Observatory and Leiden Observatory, which collaborated on the fruitful Palomar–Leiden survey in the 1960s. Gehrels used Palomar's Samuel Oschin telescope (also known as the 48-inch Schmidt Telescope), and shipped the photographic plates to Ingrid and Cornelis van Houten at Leiden Observatory where astrometry was carried out. The trio are credited with the discovery of several thousand asteroid discoveries.

== Physical characteristics ==
Sijthoff is an assumed S-type asteroid, according to its classification to the Flora family.

=== Rotation period ===
In October 2011, a rotational lightcurve of Sijthoff was obtained from photometric observations in the S-band by astronomers at the Palomar Transient Factory in California. Lightcurve analysis gave a rotation period of 4.607 hours with a brightness amplitude of 0.29 magnitude (U=2).

=== Diameter and albedo ===
According to the survey carried out by the NEOWISE mission of NASA's Wide-field Infrared Survey Explorer, Sijthoff measures between 5.030 and 5.205 kilometers in diameter and its surface has an albedo between 0.2164 and 0.231. The Collaborative Asteroid Lightcurve Link assumes an albedo of 0.24 – derived from 8 Flora, the parent body of the Flora family – and calculates a diameter of 5.41 kilometers based on an absolute magnitude of 13.5.

== Naming ==
This minor planet was named after Albert Georg Sijthoff, publisher of the independent newspaper Haagsche Courant, who promoted the popularization of astronomy in the Netherlands. The Sijthoff family backed the 1934 construction of the "Sijthoff Planetarium" in the Hague which burned down in 1975 and was replaced by the Omniversum. The official naming citation was published by the Minor Planet Center on 5 November 1987 (M.P.C. 12458).
