= Provinciale Drentsche en Asser Courant =

Dutch newspaper

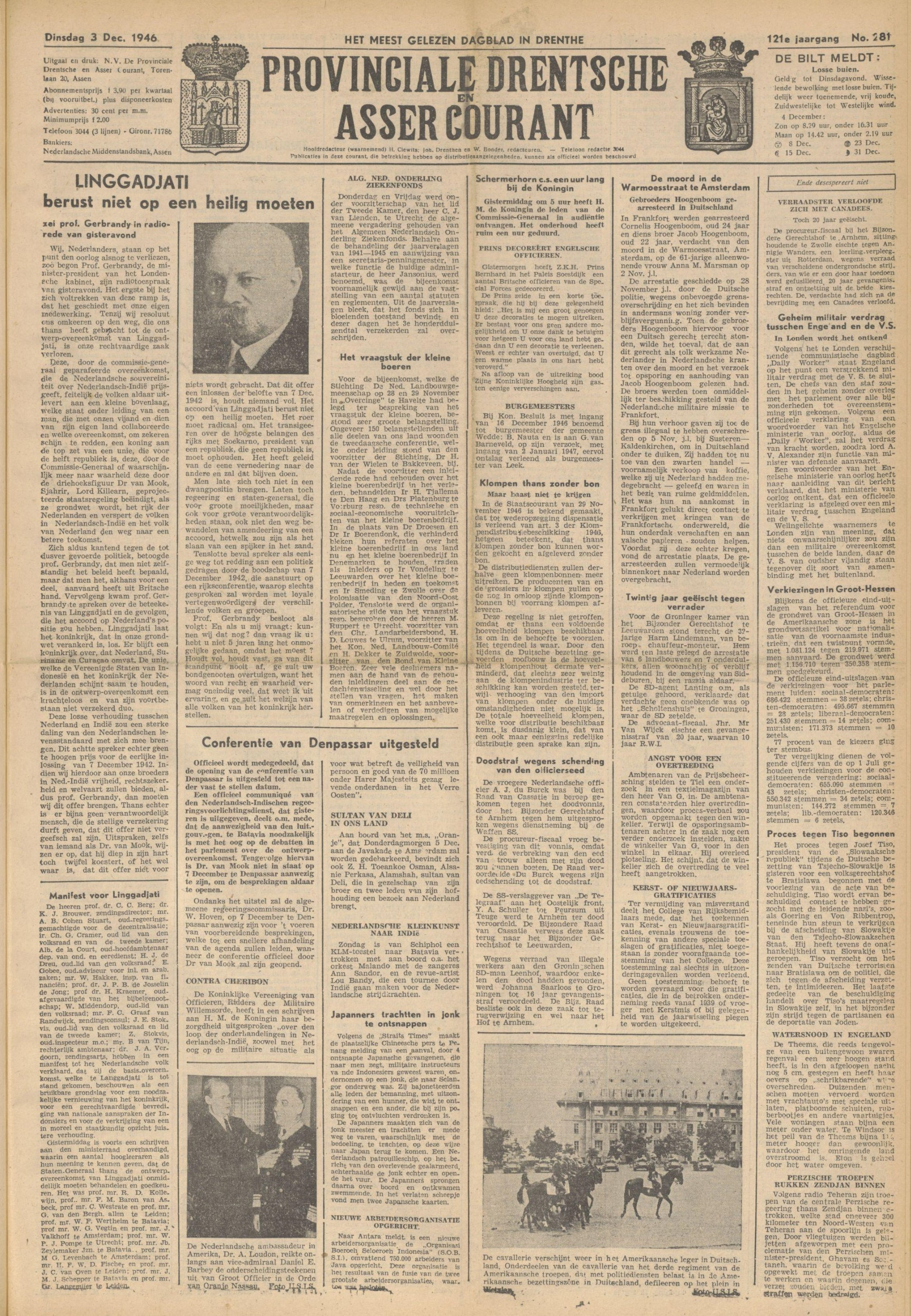
- Type: Daily newspaper
- Founded: 1823 (1851 under this name)
- Ceased publication: 2002 (1966 under this name)
- Language: Dutch
- Headquarters: Assen
- Country: Netherlands

The Provinciale Drentsche en Asser Courant was a regional newspaper in Drenthe, Netherlands, that was published in Assen under various names and owners from 1823 to 2002. It was published for the longest time under the name Provinciale Drentsche en Asser Courant, from 1851 to 1966. The Provinciale Drentsche en Asser Courant was a continuation of the Nieuws- en Advertentieblad voor de Provincie Drenthe (1823–1826) and Drentsche Courant (1826–1851). It was continued as the Drentse en Asser Courant (1966–1992) and Drentse Courant (1992–2002). In 2002 the Drentse Courant merged into the Dagblad van het Noorden, a shared newspaper for readers in the Dutch provinces Groningen and Drenthe.

== History ==
=== 1823–1851: Nieuws- en Advertentieblad and Drentsche Courant ===
On 1 April 1823, the 'provincial printer' of Drenthe, Claas van Gorcum, started in Assen the publication of Nieuws- en Advertentieblad voor de Provincie Drenthe (Dutch for News and Advertisement Paper for the province of Drenthe). First chief editor was Sibrand Gratama. The Nieuws- en Advertentieblad was renamed Drentsche Courant (Newspaper of Drenthe) in 1826.

=== 1851–1966: Provinciale Drentsche en Asser Courant ===
On 4 July 1851, the Drentsche Courant became the Provinciale Drentsche en Asser Courant (Newspaper of Drenthe Province and Assen). In 1869 frequency of publication increased to daily.

=== 1966–1992: Drentse en Asser Courant ===
In 1966 the Drents-Groningse Pers (Press of Drenthe-Groningen) was founded, as the result of organizational merger of the Emmer Courant and the Provinciale Drentsche en Asser Courant. The Drents-Groningse Pers continued publish the Emmer Courant and shortened its main daily into Drentse en Asser Courant. It added a new regional edition of the Drentse en Asser Courant, the Hoogeveense Courant.

In 1975 Wegener acquired the Drents-Groningse Pers and in 1979 the Winschoter Courant was added to this company. Under Wegener, the Drentse en Asser Courant and the Emmer Courant continued to appear independently.

=== 1992–2002: Drentse Courant ===
In 1992 the Drentse en Asser Courant, the Emmer Courant, and the Hoogeveens Dagblad merged to form the Drentse Courant. In Groningen, the Winschoter Courant merged with its regional edition, De Noord-Ooster, into the Groninger Dagblad. The Drentse Courant and the Groninger Dagblad had the same layout and only differed from each other on the regional pages.

In 1995 Hazewinkel Pers of Groningen, publisher of Nieuwsblad van het Noorden, acquired the Drents-Groningse Pers from Wegener. Initially, its three dailies continued to appear separately. In 2001, Hazewinkel Pers announced that it would merge its daily newspapers into Dagblad van het Noorden. As a consequence, since 2002 the province of Drenthe no longer has its own daily.
