= Dagblad van het Noorden =

Dutch newspaper

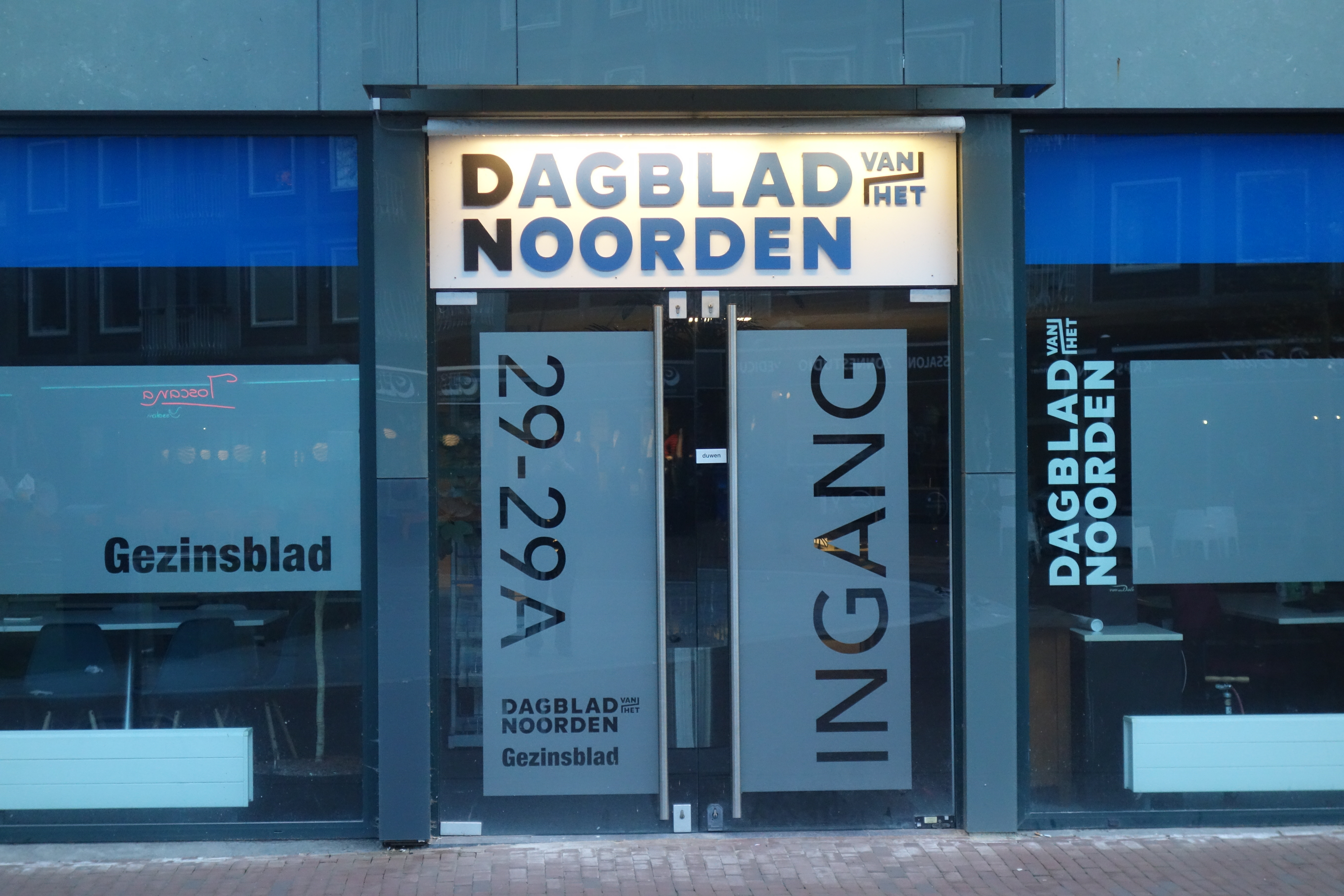
- Type: Daily newspaper
- Format: Compact
- Owner: Mediahuis
- Editor-in-chief: Erik Wijnholds
- Founded: 2002; 24 years ago
- Language: Dutch
- Headquarters: Groningen, Netherlands
- Circulation: 96,515 (2015)
- Website: dvhn.nl

The Dagblad van het Noorden (Dutch pronunciation: [ˈdɑɣblɑt fɑn ət ˈnoːrdə(n)]; (Note: In isolation, van is pronounced [vɑn].) English: Daily Newspaper of the North), abbreviated as DvhN, is a Dutch regional daily newspaper that is published and circulated in the provinces of Groningen and Drenthe in the northeastern Netherlands. The newspaper is owned by Mediahuis. Erik Wijnholds has been editor-in-chief since 2017. It had a circulation of 96,515 copies in 2015.

== History ==
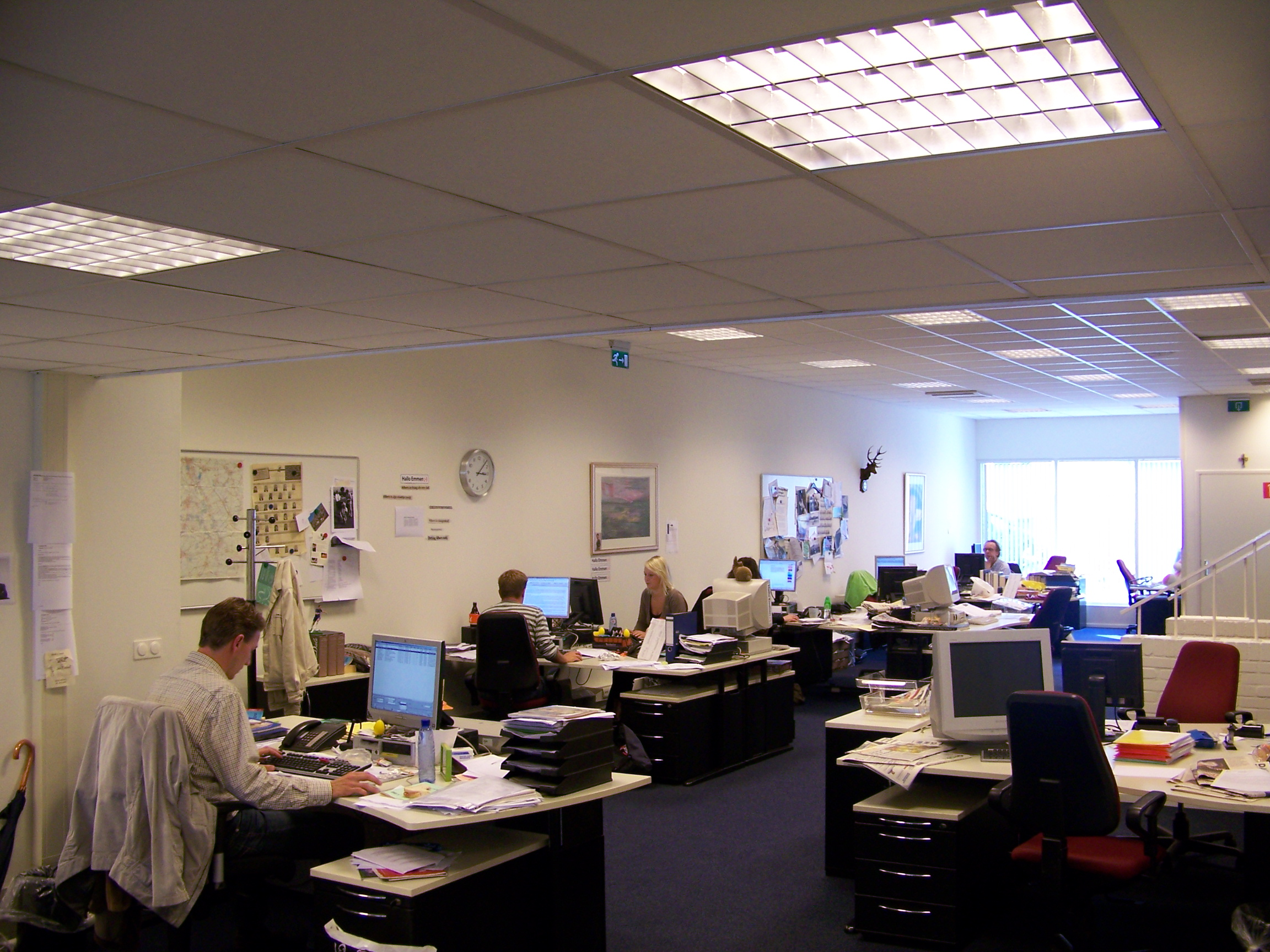
Editorial office of the Dagblad van het Noorden in Emmen in 2007

The Dagblad van het Noorden is a merger of the Nieuwsblad van het Noorden (founded in 1888), the Groninger Dagblad (founded by merger in 1992) and the Drentse Courant (founded by merger in 1991).

Its first edition was published on 2 April 2002. Jan Bonjer, who had been the editor-in-chief of the Drentse Courant, was the first editor-in-chief from 2002 to 2003. Pieter Sijpersma was editor-in-chief from 2004 till 2017, when he was succeeded by Erik Wijnholds.

== Circulation ==
| Year | Circulation | Year | Circulation |
|---|---|---|---|
| 2002 | 176,944 | 2009 | 141,623 |
| 2003 | 171,712 | 2010 | 137,813 |
| 2004 | 167,474 | 2011 | 130,145 |
| 2005 | 161,987 | 2012 | 123,475 |
| 2006 | 156,247 | 2013 | 115,012 |
| 2007 | 152,743 | 2014 | 107,085 |
| 2008 | 147,625 | 2015 | 96,515 |

The newspaper circulation started around 180,000 subscribers in 2002 and diminished to less than 100,000 subscribers in 2015.
