= Groninger Dagblad =

Dutch newspaper

- Type: Daily newspaper
- Founded: 1992
- Ceased publication: 2002
- Country: Netherlands

The Groninger Dagblad (English: Groningen Daily) is a former regional newspaper from the Netherlands. It was published from 1992 until 2002. It was a merger of the Winschoter Courant (1870) and De Noord-Ooster (founded 1904; a daily since 1946). In 2002, it merged with the Nieuwsblad van het Noorden and the Drentse Courant into the Dagblad van het Noorden.
