= Veen Bosch & Keuning =

Dutch publishing company

Veen Bosch & Keuning (VBK) is a Dutch publishing group of fiction and nonfiction books that is active also in Belgium. Headquartered in Utrecht, it operates through multiple units. Since May 2024, the company has been a subsidiary of the American publisher Simon & Schuster.

== History ==
Bosch & Keuning was founded in 1925 when the name of Christian publisher E.J. Bosch J.Bzn was coupled with that of his companion Pieter Keuning. In 1997 the graphical activities were split from Bosch & Keuning, after which the company expanded as a publisher. In 1999 Veen Uitgevers Groep spun off from publishing group Wolters Kluwer. Veen referred to L.J. Veen, founder of one of the units, founded in 1887. In the Spring of 2001 Veen and Bosch & Keuning merged into Veen Bosch & Keuning.

The Noordelijke Dagblad Combinatie merged in March 2005 with Veen Bosch & Keuning to form NDC|VBK. ThiemeMeulenhoff was also part of the media conglomerate. On 1 June 2007, the NDC Mediagroep was established as the subsidiary of NDC|VDK that would handle interests in periodicals, radio and TV. The group's interest in radio and TV was temporary. In late 2012 the VBK and ThiemeMeulenhoff book publication activities were spun off. As a result, the NDC|VBK became obsolete and VBK, ThiemeMeulenhoff, NDC Mediagroep became independent companies again.

In December 2017 Veen Bosch & Keuning acquired Bruna. In 2019, it sold Bruna to the Audax Groep, who already owned AKO, Bruna's main competitor.

In May 2024, Simon & Schuster acquired Veen Bosch & Keuning. The acquisition includes all of VBK's imprints in the Netherlands and Belgium, as well as its sister companies, the audiobook producer Thinium, and Bookchoice, a subscription-based platform for e-books and audiobooks. This is the first expansion of Simon & Schuster into a non-English market. In November of the same year, VBK announced plans to use artificial intelligence to translation ten non-fiction titles into English. The news prompted immediate pushback from industry organizations, including the PEN America Translation Committee, the Society of Authors, and The Authors Guild.

== Subsidiaries ==
=== Van Dale Lexicografie ===
Van Dale Lexicografie publishes the Van Dale dictionary, the authoritative Dutch-language dictionary. It also publishes bilingual dictionaries for other languages, translated from and to Dutch, and offers language courses and translation services.

=== Luitingh-Sijthoff ===
Luitingh-Sijthoff
- Parent company: Veen Bosch & Keuning
- Status: Active
- Founded: 1851 (Sijthoff), 1947 (Luitingh); 1989 (merged)
- Founder: Albertus Willem Sijthoff
- Country of origin: Netherlands
- Headquarters location: Amsterdam
- Distribution: Dutch language market
- Imprints: Luitingh, Sijthoff, Poema Pocket, Luitingh Fantasy, Uitgeverij Luitingh, Mouria
- Official website: luitingh-sijthoff.nl

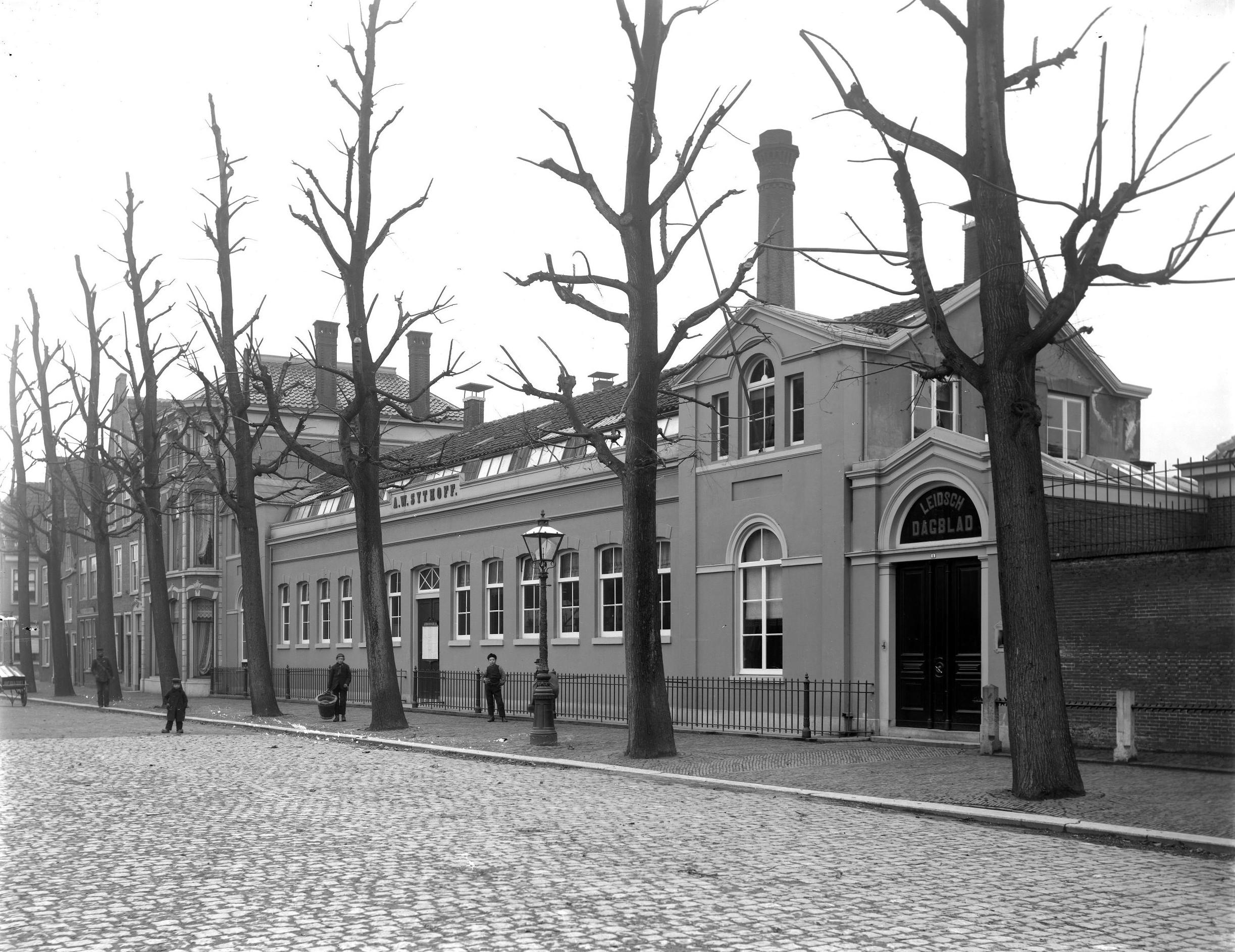
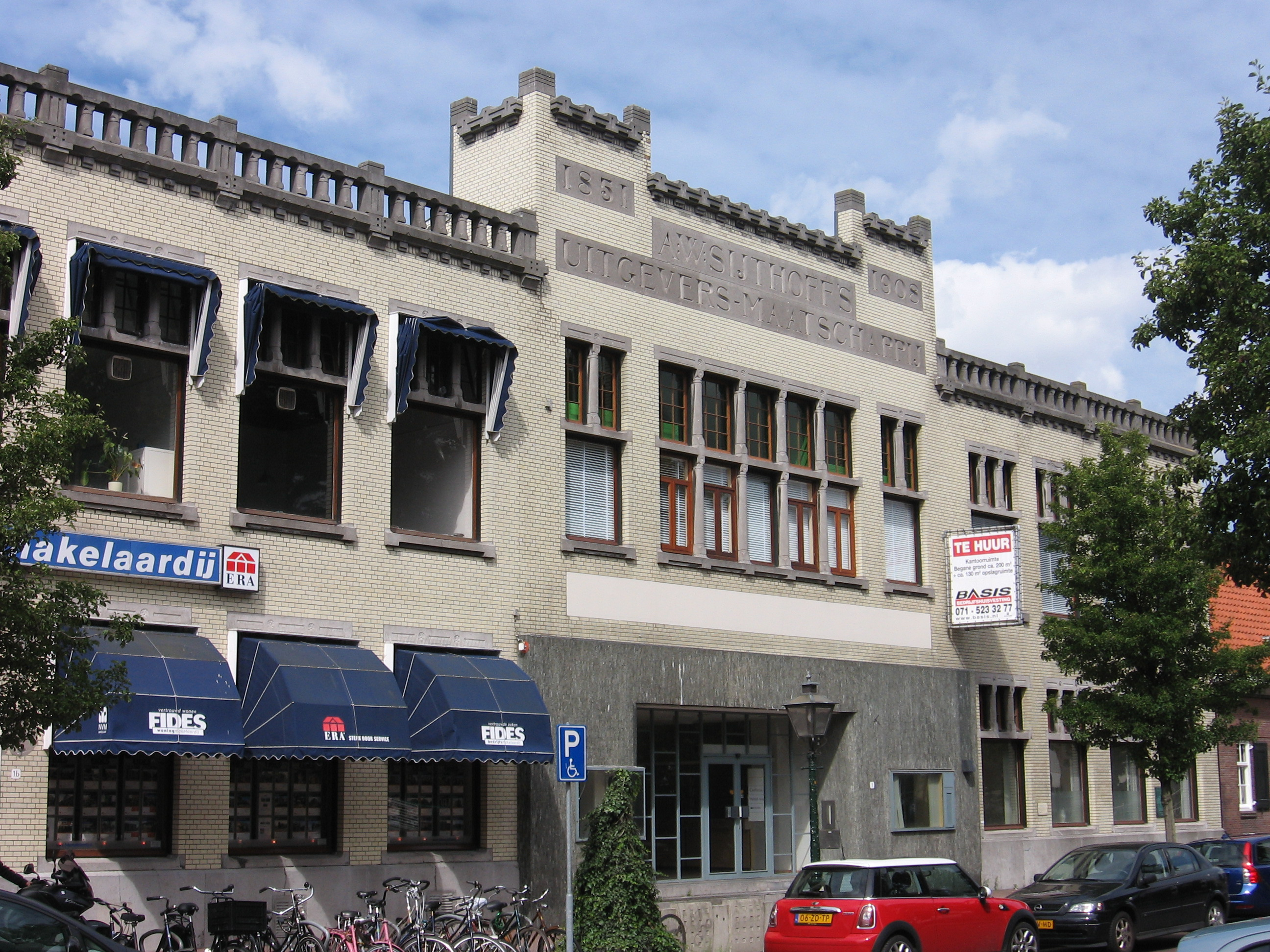
Sijthoff printing offices in Leiden built in 1852 (top) and 1908 (bottom).

Luitingh-Sijthoff releases fiction and nonfiction books for the Dutch language market.

The A.W. Sijthoff company was founded by Albertus Willem Sijthoff in Leiden in 1851 and Luitingh was established in 1947. Sijthoff, who rose to prominence in the trade of translated books, was opposed to a petition for the Netherlands to become a signatory to the Berne Convention for the Protection of Literary and Artistic Works in 1899 because he felt that the international copyright restrictions would stifle the country's publishing industry. The Sijthoff office was attacked by car bomb after the Haagsche Courant, owned at the time by the Sijthoff family, printed a negative article about business activities in the 1980s by a collection agency owned by Dutch criminal Eef Hoos.

In 1989, the A.W. Sijthoff and Luitingh publishing companies merged to form Luitingh-Sijthoff, which is headquartered in Amsterdam.

The books in Luitingh-Sijthoff's catalogue are published under a number of specialized imprints, including Luitingh, Luitingh Fantasy, Mouria, Poema-Pocket, Sijthoff, and Uitgeverij L. Luitingh publishes Dutch versions of popular English language novels by writers that include Dan Brown, Michael Crichton, Stephen King, Dean Koontz, Robert Ludlum and Thomas Harris. Since its establishment in 1992, the Luitingh Fantasy imprint publishes authors Raymond E. Feist, Terry Goodkind, Bernhard Hennen, Robin Hobb, Robert Jordan and George R.R. Martin. Poema-Pocket is a publisher of mass market paperbacks by popular fiction authors Patricia Cornwell, Jill Mansell and Danielle Steel. Sijthoff publishes thrillers and nonfiction books for casual readers, including De zaak Natalee Holloway (The Case of Natalee Holloway) by Joran van der Sloot. Since 2005, Uitgeverij L (Publishing House L) publishes cartoon collections and graphic novels and by comic book authors such as Christophe Arleston and Martin Lodewijk as well as manga artists such as Osamu Tezuka.
