= Mediahuis =

Media company in Belgium

Mediahuis NV
- Type: Private company
- Industry: Media
- Founded: 1 January 2014
- Headquarters: Belgium
- Products: Newspapers, magazines, distribution, printing, TV and online media
- Revenue: € 980 million (2020)
- Operating income: € 15 million (2020)
- Owners: Mediahuis Partners NV (50.6% stake), Concentra (32.7% stake) and VP Exploitatie (16.7% stake).
- Website: www.mediahuis.com

Mediahuis (Dutch pronunciation: [ˈmeːdijaːˌɦœys]; lit. 'Media House') is a European multinational newspaper and magazine publishing, distribution, printing, television, radio and online media company founded in 2014 with assets in Belgium, the Netherlands, Ireland, Luxembourg and Germany. Mediahuis publishes daily newspaper titles in Belgium, the Netherlands and Ireland as well as regional titles, and is involved in broadcasting a number of Dutch and French language TV and radio stations.

Irish assets are held in Independent News & Media subsidiary.

The headquarters of Mediahuis is in Antwerp.

== History ==
Mediahuis was founded in January 2014 as a joint venture of two Flemish media corporations: Corelio and Concentra. They entered into a collaboration around their paper and digital publishing activities. Corelio took 62% of the shares, Concentra the remaining 38%.

In 2015, Mediahuis acquired the Dutch NRC Media group. In 2017 it acquired the Dutch Telegraaf Media Groep and VP Exploitatie joined as third shareholder. It took 16.7% of the enlarged group.

In January 2019, majority shareholder Corelio NV became Mediahuis Partners NV, holding a 50.6% stake in Mediahuis, along with Concentra (32.7%) and VP Exploitatie (16.7%). These three shareholders are in turn mainly owned by the Van Puijenbroek family, Belgian Baert family and Mediahuis chairman Thomas Leysen.

On 30 April 2019 Mediahuis acquired Independent News & Media for 145.6 million euros, which gave Mediahuis control over the Irish Independent and the Sunday Independent (Ireland), respectively Ireland's top-selling daily and Sunday newspaper, among other assets.

In July 2019, Mediahuis were reported to be interested in acquiring JPIMedia.

In September 2020, Mediahuis acquired the heavily loss-making NDC Mediagroep. In May 2023, Mediahuis acquired leading EU affairs media outlet EURACTIV, which became the company's first international media platform acquisition.

=== Mediahuis Nederland ===
Mediahuis Nederlands started as the NV Holdingmaatschappij De Telegraaf and was later coined Telegraaf Media Groep N.V. (TMG). In 2017 it was acquired by Mediahuis. It owns De Telegraaf, the most popular newspaper in the Netherlands, DFT, Telesport, Metro, Autovisie, Privé and Vrouw; regional newspapers including Haarlems Dagblad and Noordhollands Dagblad; digital brands including GeenStijl and Dumpert, and the national radio station Classic FM. In addition, Mediahuis Nederland owns dozens of other brands that focus on local news, entertainment and e-commerce. Via Keesing Media Group publishes international puzzle magazines and digital puzzles.

TMG acquired the weblog GeenStijl after initially buying an interest and Hyves, at that time still the most popular social network site in the Netherlands. In 2012, TMG acquired the free daily newspaper Metro, which folded in 2019.

In 2016, TMG held a 23% stake in a joint venture with Talpa Holding, operating radio stations Radio 538, Sky Radio, Radio Veronica, Radio 10 and thematic channels (only on Internet). In addition, the television channel TV 538.

== Media assets ==
=== Europe ===
- Rapporteur

=== Belgium ===
- De Standaard
- Het Nieuwsblad
- Gazet van Antwerpen
- Het Belang van Limburg
- Jobat (jobs website)
- Jet (magazine)
- Gotcha (classified magazine)
- Zimmo (classified magazine)
- Vroom (classified magazine)
- InMemoriam
- ROB TV, TV Limburg, ATV and TV OOST (Regional TV channels)
- Radio Nostalgie (North and South)
- Metro (stake)
- De Vijver Media (stake)
- Flanders Classics (stake)

=== Ireland ===
- Irish Independent
- Sunday Independent
- Sunday World
- The Herald
- Regional Irish newspapers

=== Luxembourg ===
- Luxemburger Wort

=== Northern Ireland ===
- Belfast Telegraph
- Sunday Life

=== Germany ===
- Aachener Zeitung
- Aachener Nachrichten

=== Netherlands ===
- De Telegraaf
- NRC Handelsblad
- Mediahuis Noord

==== Regional Dutch newspapers ====
- Privé
- JAAP.nl
- Helders Weekblad
- Telesport
- Huizenzoeker.nl
- Het Gezinsblad
- VROUW
- Speurders.nl
- Laarder Courant de Bel
- Autovisie
- Hyves Games
- Denksport
- Metro
- Blog Society
- Nieuwsblad voor Castricum
- Sublime
- Vacaturekrant.nl
- Schager Weekblad
- Wendy
- Nieuwsblad Santpoort en Velserbroek
- Vecht Journaal
- Noordhollands Dagblad
- IJmuider Courant
- Weekblad voor Ouder Amstel
- Haarlems Dagblad
- Baarns Weekblad
- Westfries Weekblad
- Leidsch Dagblad
- Stadsblad De Echo
- Wieringer Courant
- De Gooi- en Eemlander
- Witte Weekblad
- Woonbode
- Dumpert
- Haarlems Weekblad
- Nieuwsblad voor Huizen
- Upcoming
- Alkmaars Weekblad
- Nieuwsblad De Kennemer
- De Duinstreek
- De Krommenieër
- Das Kapital
- De Gooi en Eembode
- De Zaankanter
- GasPedaal.nl
- De Koerier
- GroupDeal
- Botentekoop.nl
- Relatieplanet.nl
- CampersCaravans.nl
- De Telegraaf
- Heemsteedse Courant
- De Financiële Telegraaf (DFT)
- Haarlems Weekblad

== See also ==
- Dichtbij.nl
- Dumpert
