= Haagsche Courant =

Dutch newspaper

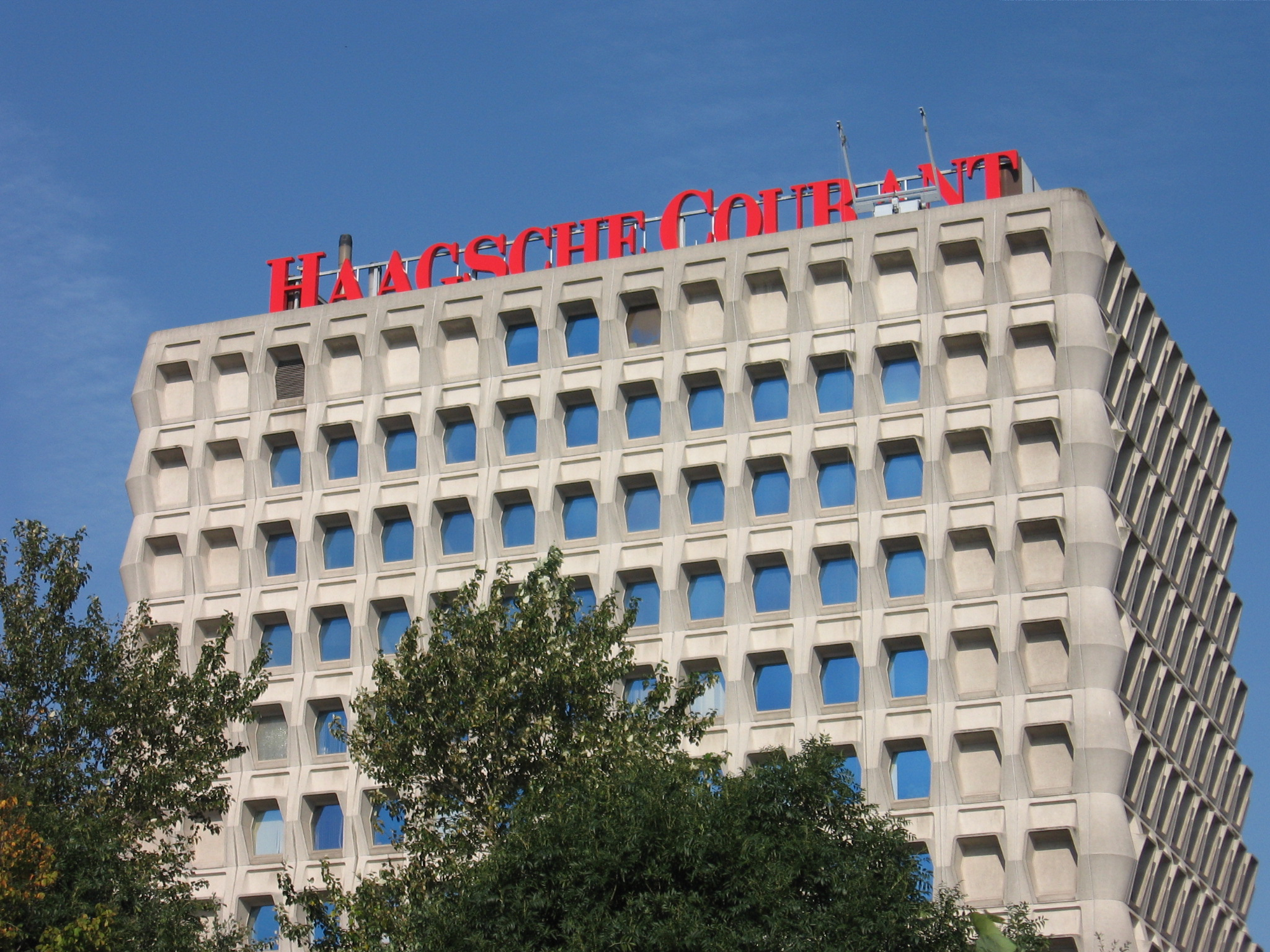
The former headquarters of the Haagsche Courant in Rijswijk

The Haagsche Courant operated as an independent newspaper between 1864 and 2005 in The Hague and its suburbs. After it was acquired by the Algemeen Dagblad (AD) it is now published as AD Haagse Courant, written by local staff and the AD crew.

== History ==
The paper appeared as early as 1864 as the Belinfante edition, but remained continuously under the control of the Sijthoff family for over 120 years since Albert Georg Sijthoff in 1883. The Sijthoff publishing company was attacked by car bomb after the newspaper printed a negative article about business activities in the 1980s by a collection agency owned by Dutch criminal Eef Hoos.

The paper remained an independent publication until 2005 when it merged with the Algemeen Dagblad, along with Rijn en Gouwe, Rotterdams Dagblad, De Dordtenaar and the Utrechts Nieuwsblad. It continues to be published as AD Haagsche Courant, a regional edition of the Algemeen Dagblad for The Hague and suburbs.
