= List of newspapers in the Netherlands =

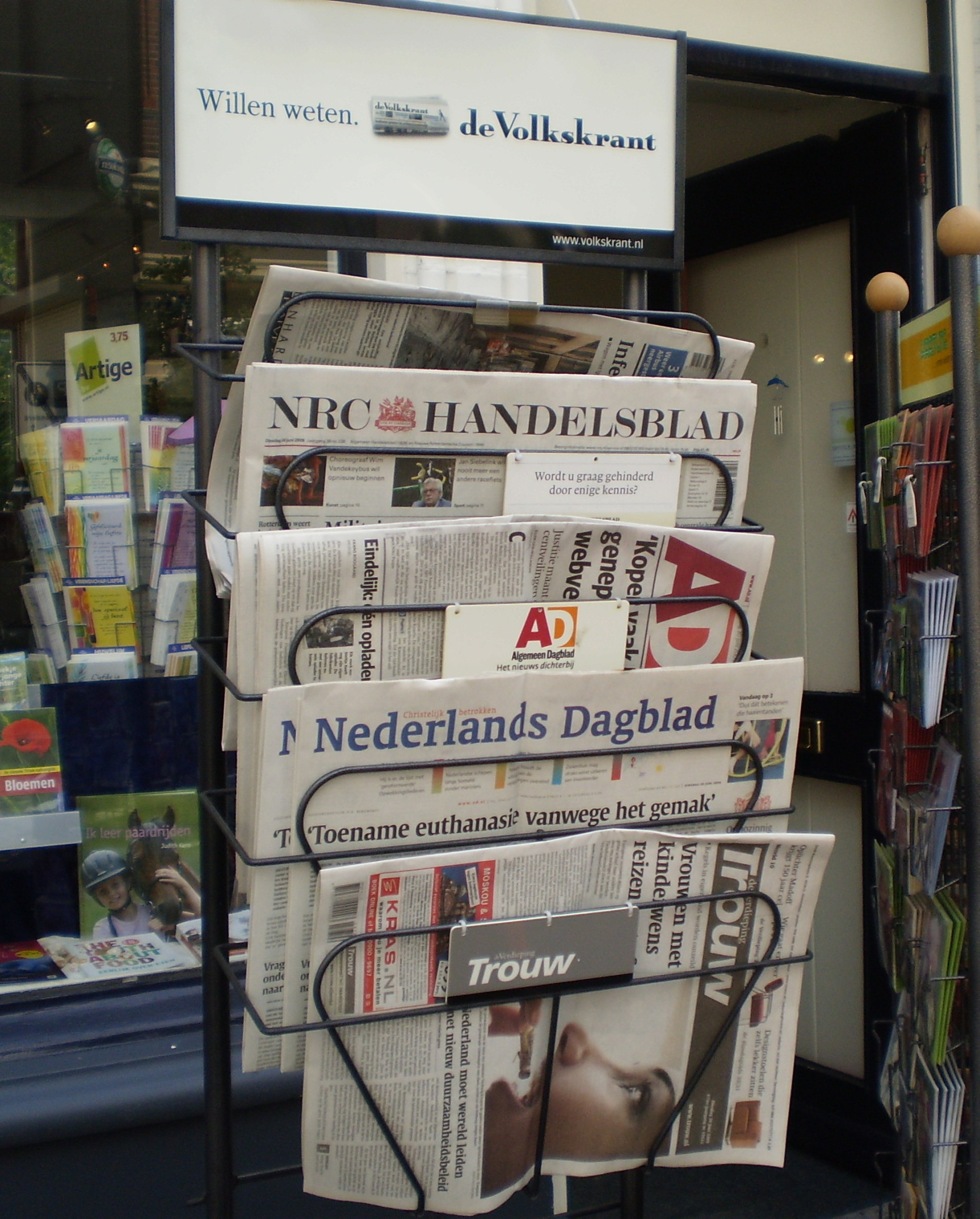
Rack with Dutch newspapers

Below is a list of newspapers in the Netherlands.

Newspapers in the Netherlands are issued every day, with the exception of Sunday and some general holidays. The total number of printed daily newspapers was 27 in 2019, down from 35 in 2009. Of the 27 dailies, 10 are national, 16 regional and 1 local. Some of the regional newspapers offer editions for smaller regions, as does the national Algemeen Dagblad for its readers in South Holland and Utrecht.

== National dailies ==
The number of national daily newspapers in the Netherlands was 108 in 1950, 38 in 1965, 10 in the 2010s, 9 since March 2020, and 8 since March 2021.

| Newspaper | Headquarters | Circulation | Publisher | Earliest predecessor | First issue |
|---|---|---|---|---|---|
| De Telegraaf | Amsterdam | 385,501 | Mediahuis | Courante uyt Italien, Duytslandt, &c. | 1618-06-18 or earlier |
| Algemeen Dagblad | Rotterdam | 340,758 | DPG | Goudsche Courant? | 1862-04-03 |
| De Volkskrant | Amsterdam | 239,219 | DPG | De Volkskrant | 1919-10-02 |
| NRC | Amsterdam | 138,589 | Mediahuis | Algemeen Handelsblad | 1828‑01‑05 |
| Trouw | Amsterdam | 98,882 | DPG | Oranje-Bode | 1943-02-18 |
| Het Financieele Dagblad | Amsterdam | 47,363 | FD Mediagroep | Prys-Courant der Effecten | 1796-08-02 |
| Reformatorisch Dagblad | Apeldoorn | 42,967 | Erdee Media Groep | Reformatorisch Dagblad | 1971-04-01 |
| Nederlands Dagblad | Amersfoort | 19,593 | Nederlands Dagblad | Reformatie Stemmen | 1944 (summer) |

- Circulation data was for 2017, the last year precise numbers were published. For 2019, a list is available that does not control for returned newspapers. Since, only exposure is published, not separating print from online.

== Regional dailies ==
| Newspaper | Headquarters | Circulation | Region | Publisher | Earliest predecessor | First issue |
|---|---|---|---|---|---|---|
| De Limburger | Sittard | 122,269 | Limburg | Mediahuis | Nieuwsblad van de stad en het district Roermond | 1856‑01‑05 |
| De Gelderlander | Nijmegen | 111,311 | Gelderland | DPG | De Batavier, Staat- en Letterkundig Weekblad | 1843‑08‑24 |
| De Stentor | Zwolle | 96,008 | Gelderland (north), Overijssel (west) | DPG | Overijsselsch Weekblad | 1790‑06‑05 |
| Noordhollands Dagblad | Alkmaar | 95,767 | North Holland (center/north) | Mediahuis | Noord-Hollandsche Courant | 1796‑12‑14 |
| Dagblad van het Noorden | Groningen | 95,202 | Groningen, Drenthe | Mediahuis | Nieuws- en Advertentieblad voor de Provincie Drenthe (Assen) | 1823‑04‑01 |
| Brabants Dagblad | 's-Hertogenbosch | 92,318 | North Brabant (center/northeast) | DPG | Eerste 's-Hertogenbossche Dinsdagse Courant | 1771‑07‑02 |
| Tubantia | Enschede | 85,096 | Overijssel (east) | DPG | Tubantia, Volkscourant voor Twenthe | 1872‑01‑06 |
| Eindhovens Dagblad | Eindhoven | 81,217 | North Brabant (southeast) | DPG | Peel- en Kempenbode | 1876‑?‑? |
| BN De Stem | Breda | 78,827 | North Brabant (west) | DPG | Weekblad voor Oosterhout en Omstreken; De Marktkrant (Roosendaal) | 1860‑05‑20; 1860‑?‑? |
| Leeuwarder Courant | Leeuwarden | 64,639 | Friesland | Mediahuis | Leeuwarder Saturdagse Courant | 1752‑07‑29 |
| Het Parool | Amsterdam | 49,483 | North Holland (southeast) | DPG | Nieuwsbrief van Pieter 't Hoen | 1940‑07‑25 |
| Provinciale Zeeuwse Courant | Vlissingen | 41,111 | Zeeland | DPG | Middelburgsche Courant | 1758-04-26 |
| Haarlems Dagblad | Haarlem | 25,464 | North Holland (southwest) | Mediahuis | Weeckelycke Courante van Europa | 1656-01-08 |
| Leidsch Dagblad | Leiden | 21,318 | South Holland (north) | Mediahuis | Leidsch Dagblad | 1860-03-01 |
| De Gooi- en Eemlander | Hilversum | 17,020 | North Holland (southeast) | Mediahuis | Gooisch Nieuwsblad | 1871-11-11 |
| Friesch Dagblad | Leeuwarden | 12,112 | Friesland | Mediahuis | Provinciale Friesche Courant | 1842-?-? |

- All titles are paid and in tabloid format.
- Circulation data is for 2017.

== Local dailies ==
| Newspaper | Headquarters | Distribution | Municipality | Publisher | Earliest predecessor | First issue |
|---|---|---|---|---|---|---|
| Barneveldse Krant | Barneveld | 9,614 | Barneveld | BDU Media | Barneveldsche Courant | 1871-10-06 |

== Former newspapers ==
- Hoornsche Courant

== Bibliography ==
- British Museum (1885), "Amsterdam", Periodical Publications, Catalogue of Printed Books, London
- Arthur der Weduwen (2017). Dutch and Flemish Newspapers of the Seventeenth Century. Brill. ISBN 9789004317314.
