= Paul Kusters =

Dutch painter and cartoonist

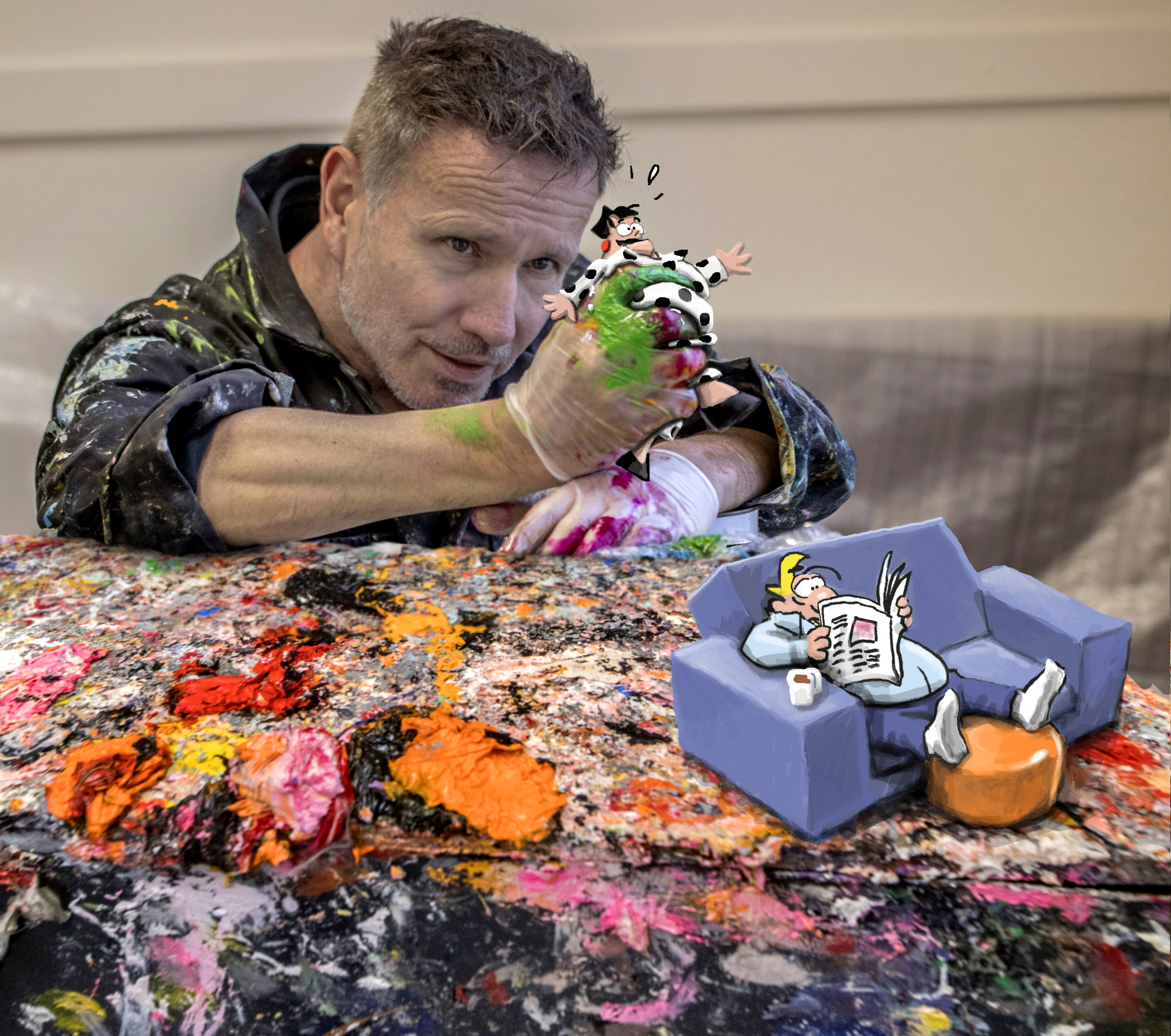
Kusters in 2019

Paul Kusters (born 19 April 1966) is a Dutch cartoonist and visual artist. His cartoons have been published in various national and regional Dutch newspapers since the 1990s. He drew weekly media cartoons for de Volkskrant for 15 years. He also made cartoons for Het Financieele Dagblad for 10 years.

Born in Geleen, Limburg, Netherlands, Kusters studied at the Maastricht Institute of Arts. He started working as a cartoonist in 1989. Kusters is the author of Toos & Henk, which features in the newspapers Algemeen Dagblad, BN/De Stem, De Stentor, De Gooi- en Eemlander, De Limburger, Limburgs Dagblad, Dagblad van het Noorden, Haarlems Dagblad, Leidsch Dagblad, Noordhollands Dagblad, Provinciale Zeeuwse Courant, De Twentsche Courant Tubantia, Brabants Dagblad, Eindhovens Dagblad, Leeuwarder Courant and De Gelderlander. On 22 November 2019 he completed his 5000th Toos & Henk cartoon.
