= Toos & Henk =

Dutch cartoon

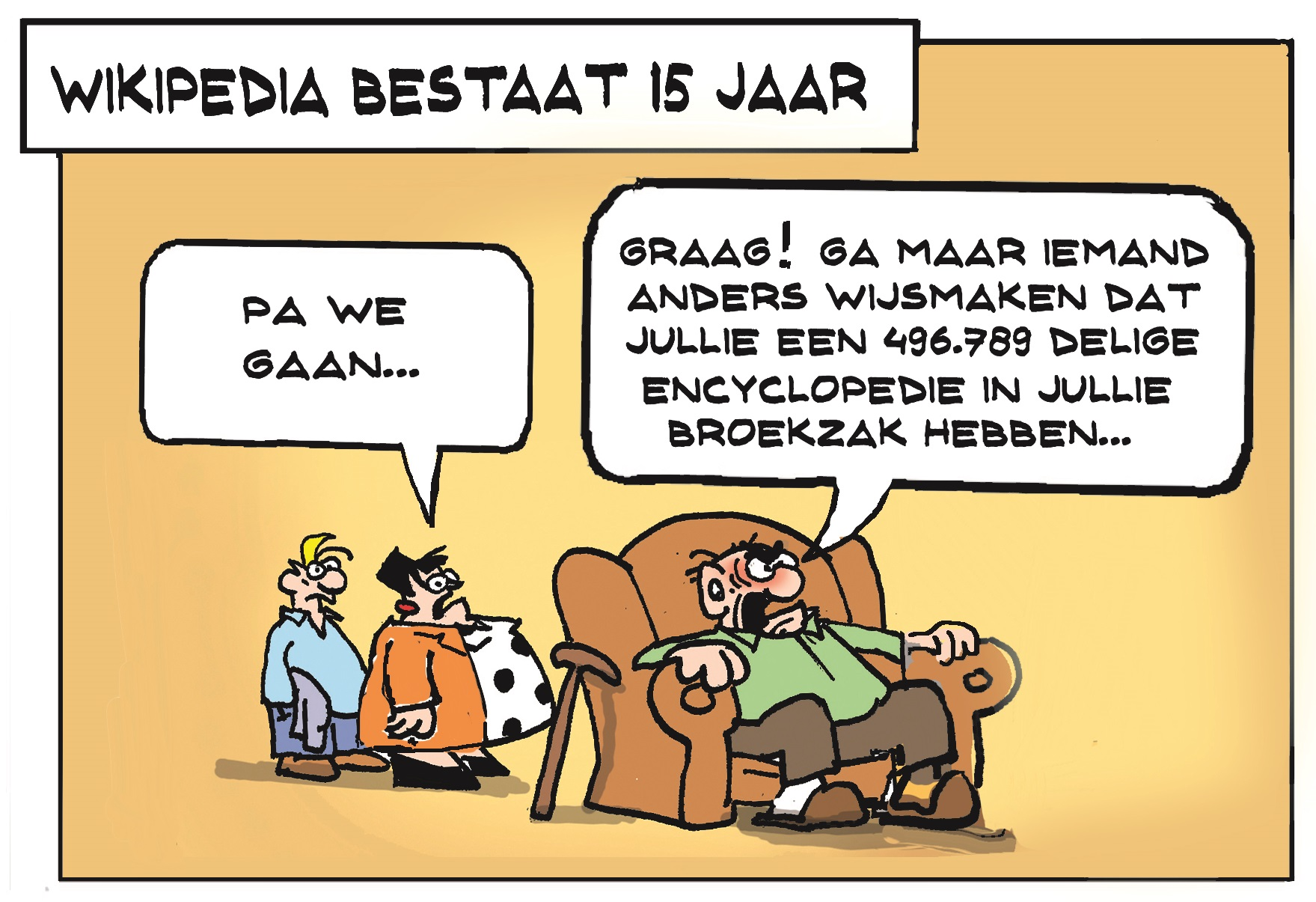
- Toos & Henk cartoon celebrating Wikipedia's 15th anniversary
- Author(s): Paul Kusters
- Launch date: 1999
- Genre(s): Gag-a-day

Toos & Henk is a cartoon created by Dutch cartoonist Paul Kusters.

The cartoons consist of a single picture and are each independent. The two main characters with the names Toos and Henk form a couple that can be described as more or less average for Dutch society.

Toos & Henk is a daily cartoon series based on current events that can be followed in the newspapers Dagblad de Limburger, Limburgs Dagblad, Brabants Dagblad, De Gooi- en Eemlander, Provinciale Zeeuwse Courant, De Gelderlander, De Twentsche Courant Tubantia, Dagblad van het Noorden, Noordhollands Dagblad, Haarlems Dagblad, Leidsch Dagblad, BN/De Stem, De Stentor and HDC.

Since 16 February 2015, the cartoon was also shown on television in RTL Late Night.
