= Wegener (company) =

Dutch publisher

Koninklijke Wegener N.V.
- Company type: Public
- Founded: 1988
- Headquarters: Laan van Westenenk 4; 7300 HB Apeldoorn; Nederland
- Key people: Joop Munsterman Manager of the Board of Directors and CEO)
- Products: Publishers, printers, reproduction of recorded media
- Revenue: ▲€ 679 million (2006)
- Operating income: ▲€ 15,5 million (2006)
- Number of employees: 4,337
- Website: wegener.nl

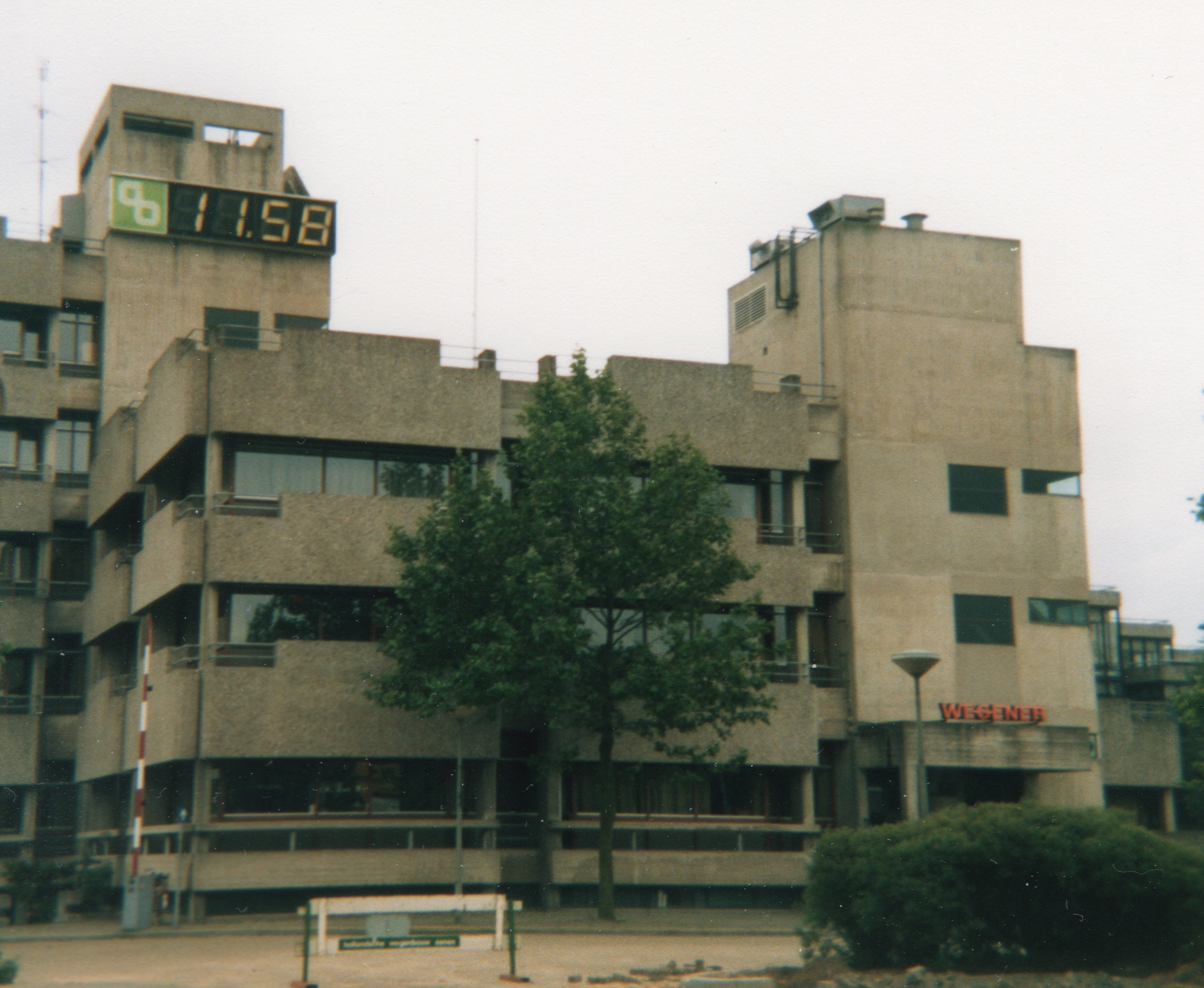
Centraal Beheer Building in Apeldoorn city center, formerly the headquarters of Wegener's Couranten Concern

Koninklijke Wegener NV was a Dutch newspaper publisher and the largest producer of daily regional newspapers, free local newspapers, and special interest magazines in the Netherlands. The company also offered internet and graphic products. The company ceased to exist after being acquired by the Belgian media company De Persgroep in 2015.

== History ==
The origin of Wegener date back to November 1903, when Johan Frederik Wegener started a news and magazine advertising business in Apeldoorn. He later launched a newspaper that would later become the Apeldoornse Courant. The Wegener corporation, as it existed in its later form, was shaped through a series of mergers and acquisitions.

In August 1999, VNU, another Dutch publisher, sold all its newspapers including BN/DeStem, Brabants Dagblad, Eindhovens Dagblad, and De Gelderlander to Wegener, significantly strengthing the company's position in the Dutch media market.

Since 6 February 2007, all Wegener newspapers have been published in tabloid format. The company has been recognised as the largest publisher of regional newspapers and door-to-door papers in the Netherlands.

== Companies ==
Wegener consisted of about 40 businesses, both in the Netherlands and in several other European countries.

- De Gelderlander
- De Stentor
- Brabants Dagblad
- BN/De Stem / PZC
- De Twentsche Courant Tubantia
- Eindhovens Dagblad
- Wegener Huis-aan-huisMedia
- Wegener Multimedia
- Wegener DM
- Wegener Grafische Groep
- Wegener Golf
- JobTrack
- AutoTrack
- Funda N.V.

From 2005 to 2009, Wegener co-owned AD Nieuwsmedia, the publisher of Algemeen Dagblad and four regional newspapers affiliated with Wegener, together with PCM, another Dutch publisher. AD Nieuwsmedia included twenty regional editions of the Algemeen Dagblad. In 2009, Wegener sold its stake in AD Nieuwsmedia to PCM.

== Shareholders ==
Wegener was taken over by the British Mecom corporation on 18 May 2008 for the sum of 800 million euros. Mecom used to own 86.4% of the company. Mecom eventually sold its shares to De Persgroep in 2015 for 245 million euros.
