= Houdoe =

Dutch parting phrase

Houdoe (Dutch pronunciation: [ˈ(ɦ)ʌudu]) is a Brabantic parting phrase which originated in the Dutch province North Brabant and is widely used there, but has spread to Limburg, the south of Gelderland and even to parts of Belgium. Houdoe has been derived from the Brabantic sentence Houd oe (eige) goed (Standard Dutch: Houd u (zelf) goed). This sentence can be translated to Take care (of yourself). Thus Houdoe is the Dutch equivalent of something like Take care and as such is used in the same manner, i.e. given when saying goodbye to someone to wish them well.

In Western parts of North Brabant people do not pronounce the H, there people say oudoe instead of houdoe. This phenomenon is called H deletion and is most prevalent in and around Roosendaal and Breda.

There are a few theories that claim an alternative origin of the word houdoe. The first one being that the word comes from the French word adieu. Some French words, from the short time that the Netherlands was ruled by France, have remained in the Brabantic dialect, thus it is possible that the French word adieu has bastardized over time to form the greeting "(h)oudoe". The other possible theory that explains the origins of the word houdoe is that it is a remnant of time of the Spanish Netherlands. In this case it would be the Spanish greeting adíos that might have transformed to "(h)oudoe".

The word houdoe also bears resemblance to the Swedish greeting to say goodbye, hej då.

Contrary to a popular assumption, houdoe has not been derived from the English language short sentence How do you do?.

There are a few (mostly local) variations to houdoe, like hoedoe and haje, but houdoe is the prominently used one. In Antwerp the full term oudoe goe (from hou je goed) is frequently used, often followed by en tot ziens (from en tot weerziens, which roughly means and until I see you again).

In 2005 the newspapers Brabants Dagblad, Eindhovens Dagblad and BN/De Stem organized an election for the most beautiful Brabantic word, which was won by the word Houdoe.
