= Tuinbouwschool Huis te Lande =

Historic horticultural school in the Netherlands

Coordinates: 52.0464°N 4.3157°E

The Tuinbouwschool Huis te Lande was a horticultural school in Rijswijk, Netherlands, founded in 1907 by Jacoba Hingst. It was the first and only horticultural school for girls and women in the Netherlands to give them the opportunity to learn how to grow flowers, fruit and vegetables, as the existing horticultural schools of that time were not accessible to them.

== History ==
After Jacoba Hingst, who was originally wealthy, studied biology and received a teaching diploma in zoology and botany in 1904, she bought more than three hectares of land in the municipality of Rijswijk. She had a villa built by the architects Samuel de Clercq and Jan Gratama as a horticultural school for girls, since the horticultural schools in Lisse, Aalsmeer and Frederiksoord in the province of Drenthe were only attended by boys. The school began operations in 1907 with two students and remained a small attendance for the following years.

The annual tuition fee was the then considerable sum of 300 guilders. The school was originally intended for students, most of whom came from the upper middle class, and was aimed primarily at the future wives of notaries, doctors, priests and judges, whom Hingst wanted to train in home gardening. After the loss of the second teacher Cornelia Pompe in 1911 and death in 1913, Hingst founded the horticultural foundation "Huis te Lande" in 1914 to secure financial support for the school. She gained scientists such as Johanna Westerdijk as foundation members. The new board of seven people ran the school. Jacoba Hingst joined the foundation as director, and also ran the secretariat and used all of her own assets for the school.

In 1915, the number of students rose sharply, with eleven students in the first grade and two in the second grade, as the war-related border closures in the neutral Netherlands made it less easy for upper-class daughters to be sent abroad. When admitted, they had to be at least seventeen years old and had to have knowledge of foreign languages and chemistry. The school adapted to the circumstances and offered boarding places for 700 guilders annually. After years of effort, the board, led by Jacoba Hingst, managed to receive a state subsidy for "Huis te Lande" from the Ministry of Agriculture, Industry and Trade starting in 1921. From 1922, salaries were guaranteed by the ministry and seven years later they were equalized to those in industrial training. As a requirement, the ministry also ordered that tuition fees be adjusted to the parents' income. From 1934 the diploma from "Huis te Lande" was recognized by the ministry. Over time, the school changed from an elite private school to a comprehensive school for all, which was open to girls from an agricultural background or the working class.

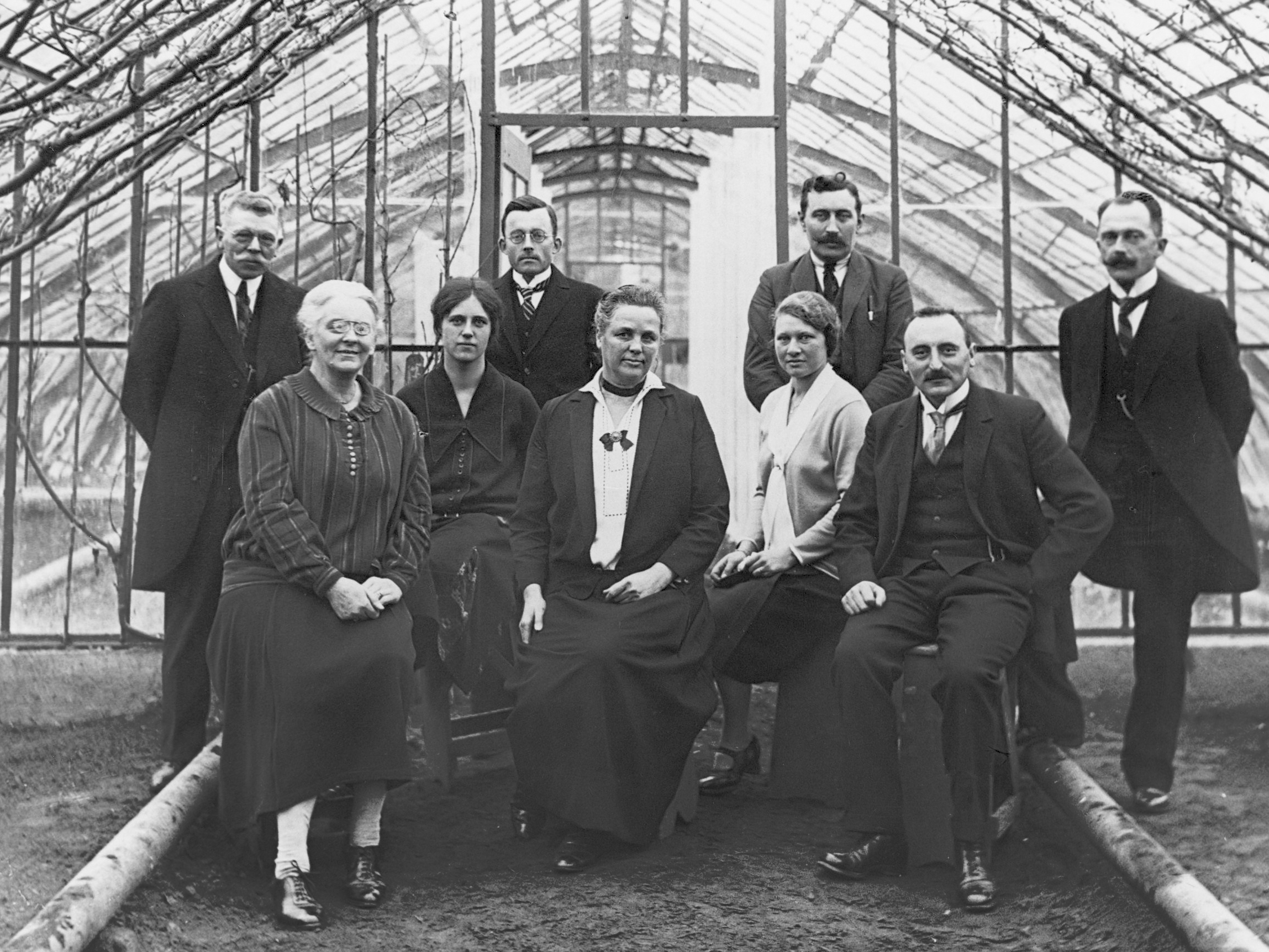
School teachers, in the middle Jacoba Hingst, c.1935

On the 25th anniversary of "Huis te Lande" in 1932, Jacoba Hingst was honored as a Knight of the Order of Orange-Nassau. She resigned as director in 1937 and resigned from her position as secretary of the board of directors in 1945. During the Second World War and the occupation, school operations were initially maintained under certain conditions and restrictions. On 19 May 1944, the Wehrmacht confiscated the main building and the school had to close. In September 1945, classes resumed with fifty students. In 1947 the board renamed the foundation to "Jacoba Hingst Stichting".

From 1985 boys were also admitted. The school has been part of the Wellantcollege in Rijswijk since 2000. In the first 75 years since its founding, the school only had three directors: Jacoba Hingst until 1937, Erna Casparé from 1937 to 1963 and Ant Post from 1963 to 1983. This was followed by Marjolijn Pouw as head of the school from 1983 to 1991, Peter Kraaijeveld until 2006 and Maarten Guichelaar was his successor.

== School grounds and lessons ==
In 1907, in addition to a living area for Jacoba Hingst and the biologist Cornelia Pompe, who had studied with Hingst, the building had a classroom, a library, a laboratory, a coffee room and a dining room on the ground floor, which was also used as a consultation room.

The garden was built near the house in 1904. These included greenhouses, a grape and vegetable greenhouse, a rose greenhouse with sheds, a machine cellar, a packing shed, a warehouse, and a "practice hut" built in 1909, which enabled the students to work outdoors even in bad weather. An assistant or gardener's house was built in the middle of the site. An orangery with a vegetable and fruit cellar was also built. In addition, cold frames, a tree nursery and the garden planned by Hingst with fruit tree plantations were created.

When boarders were admitted in 1915, the villa was renovated and restructured to create bedrooms and living rooms for them, and Jacoba Hingst moved into the "Villa Huis te Velde", which she had built at the rear of the property. In 1954 the school again became too small for the growing number of students and a new school building with three classrooms was built.

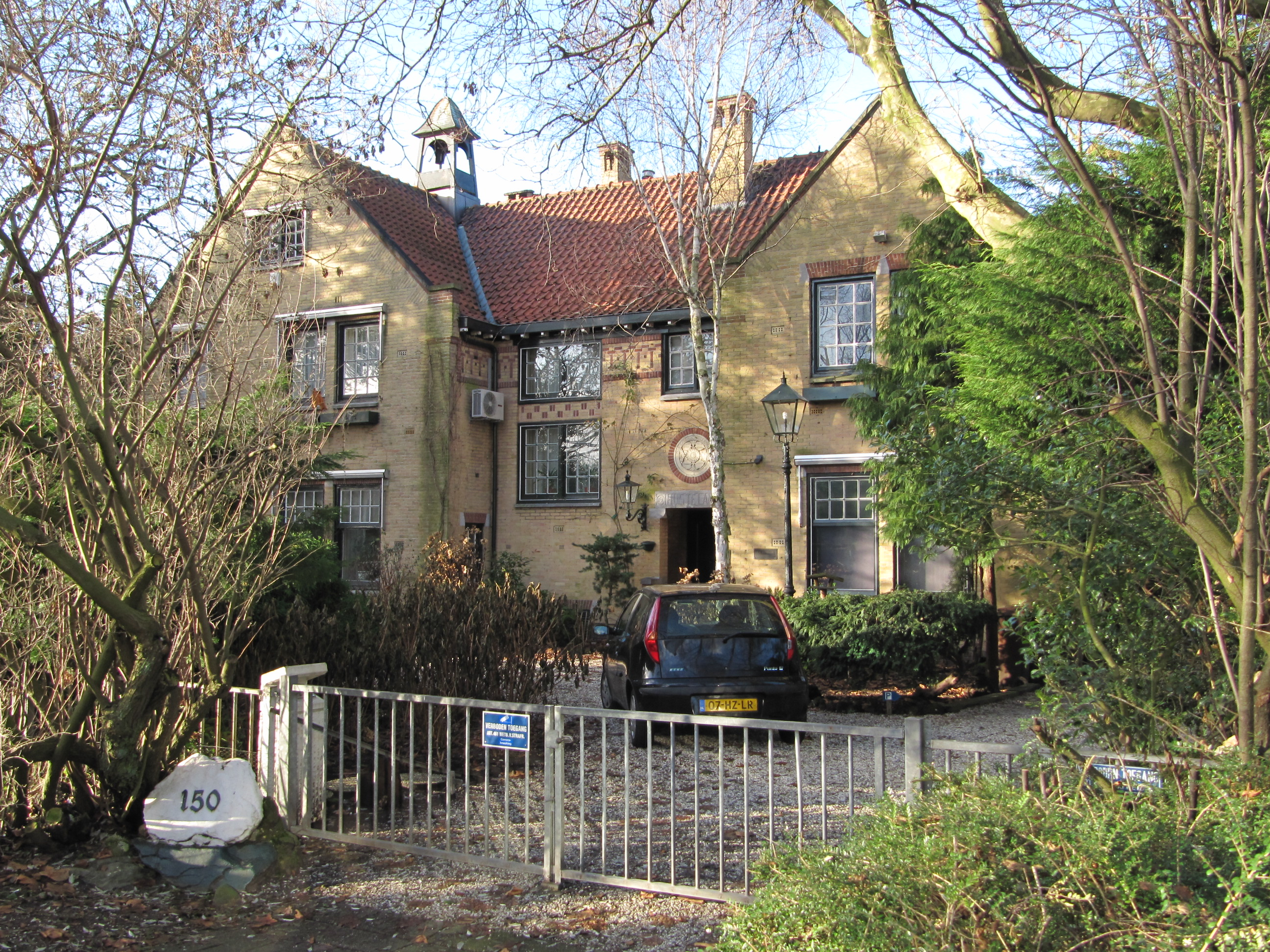
School building, 2011

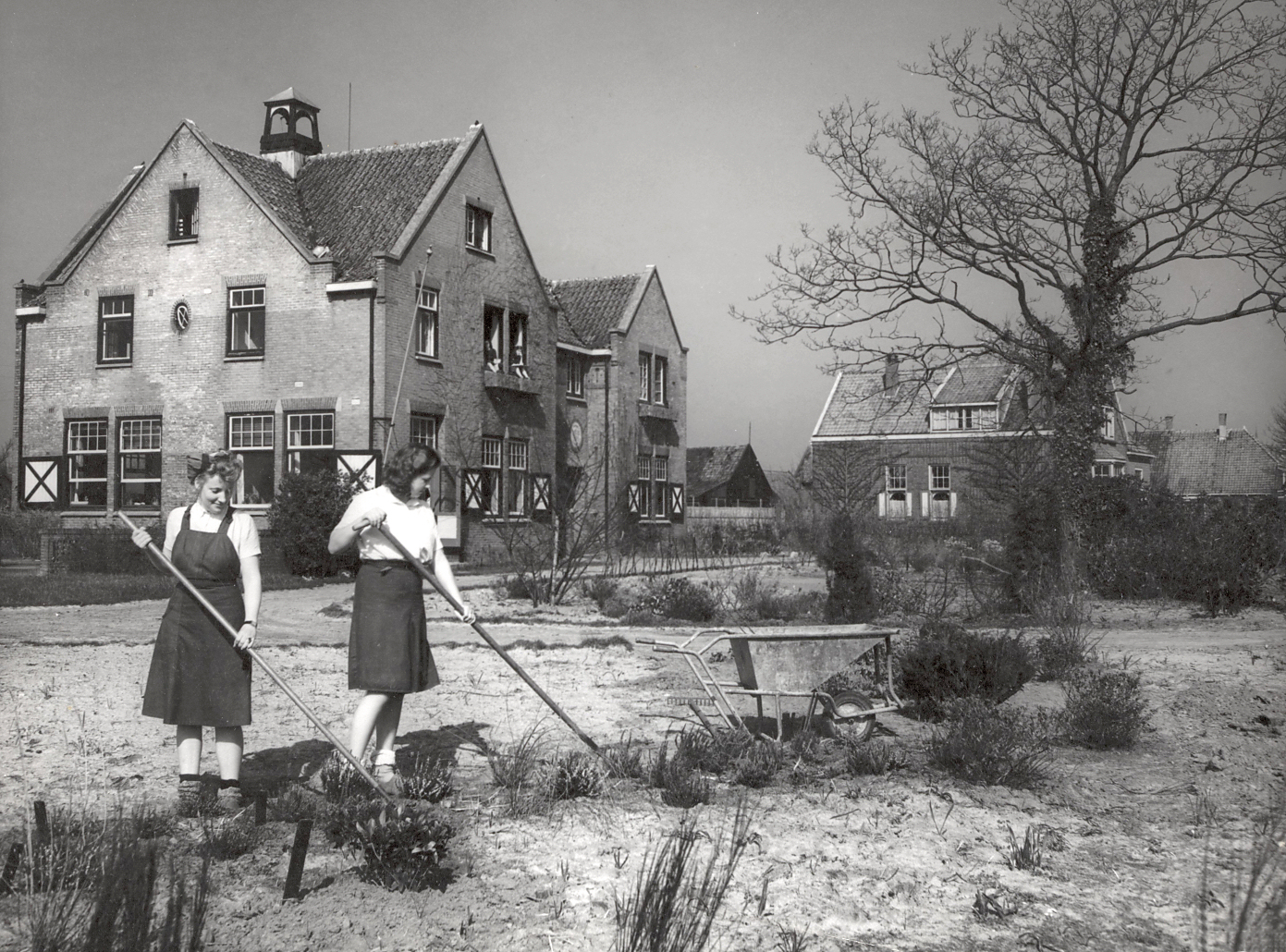
Schoolgirls at work, the school building in the background, April 1946

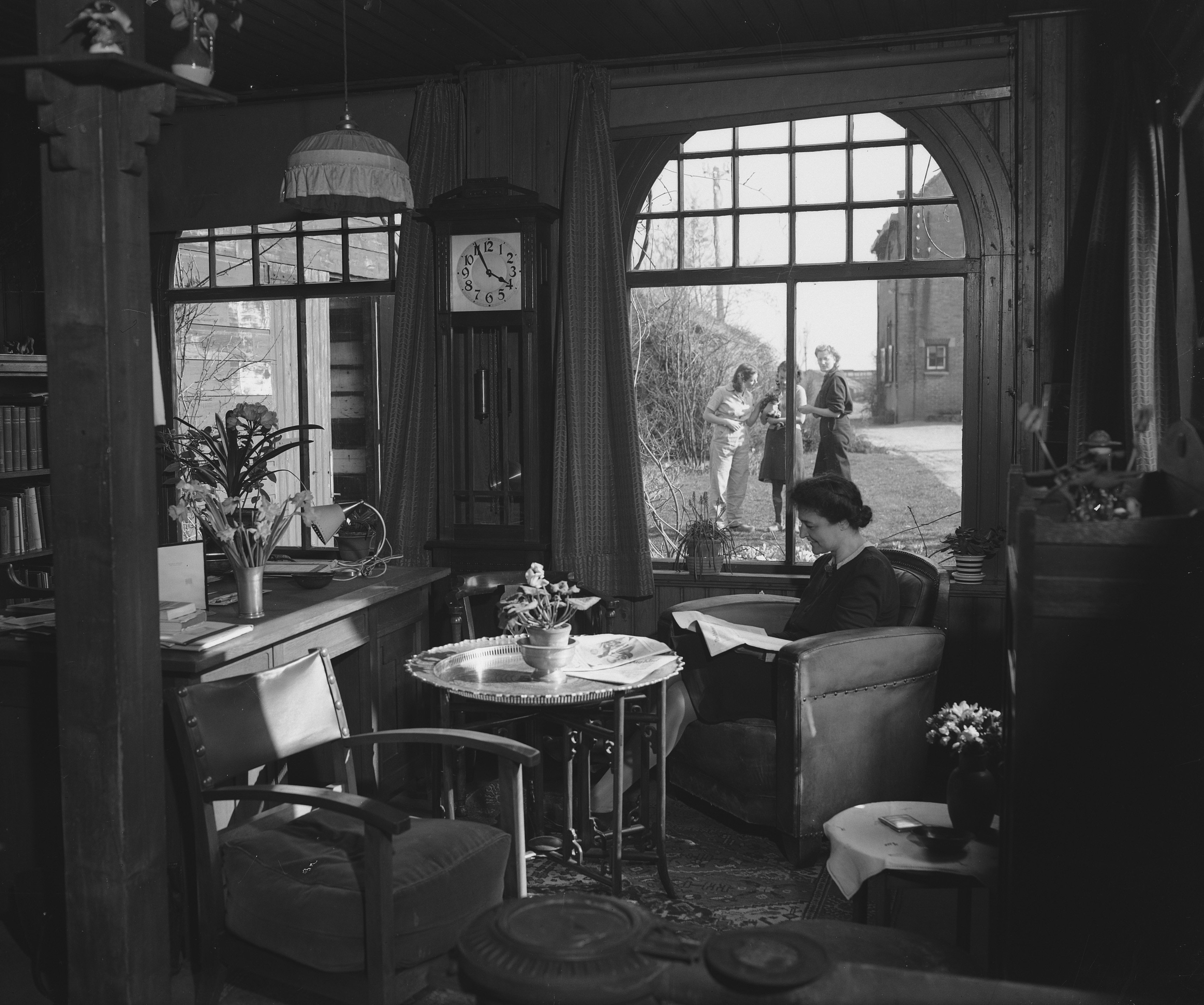
Erna Casparé in her house (former warehouse from 1909) on the school grounds, April 1946

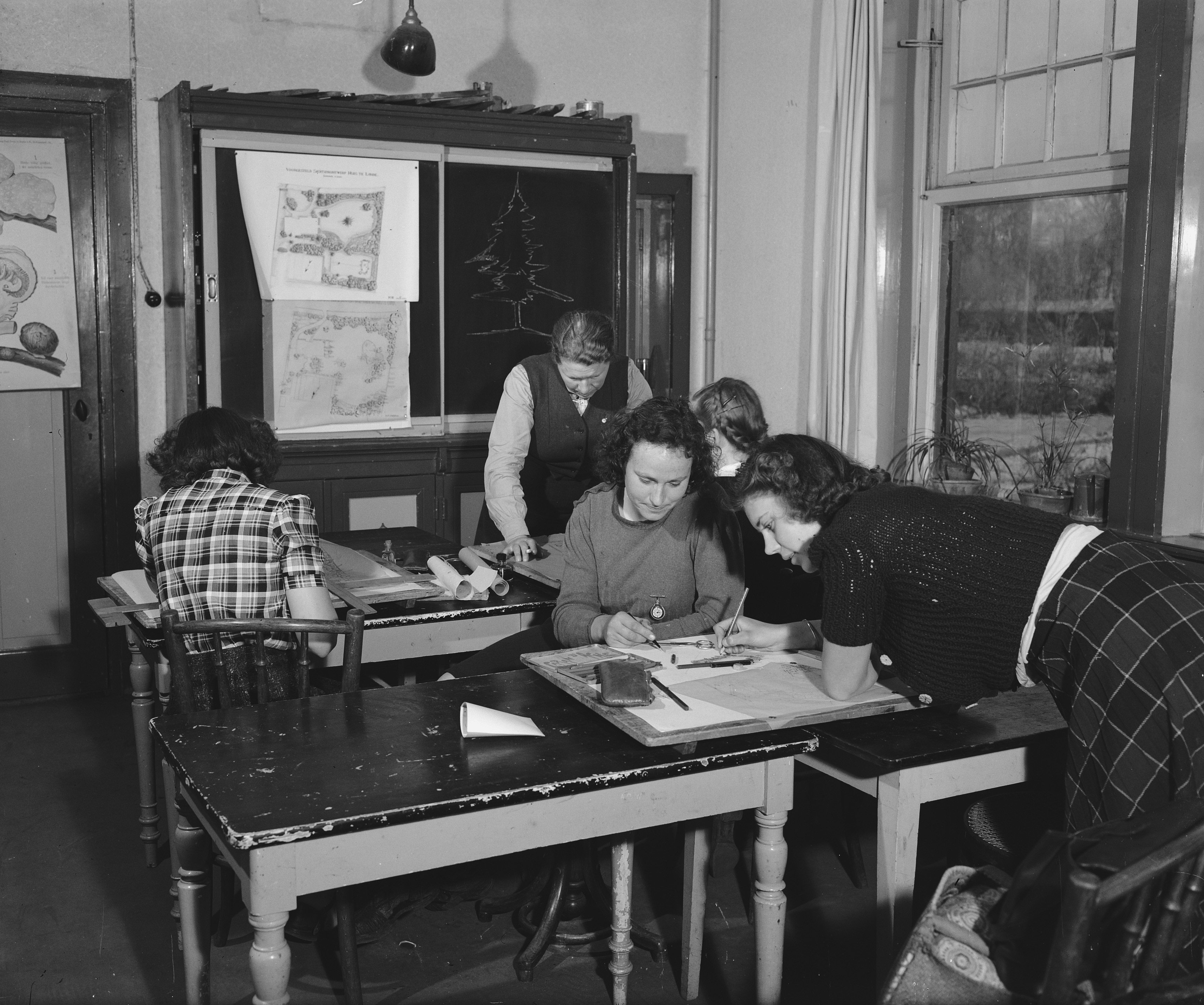
Lessons in a classroom, April 1946

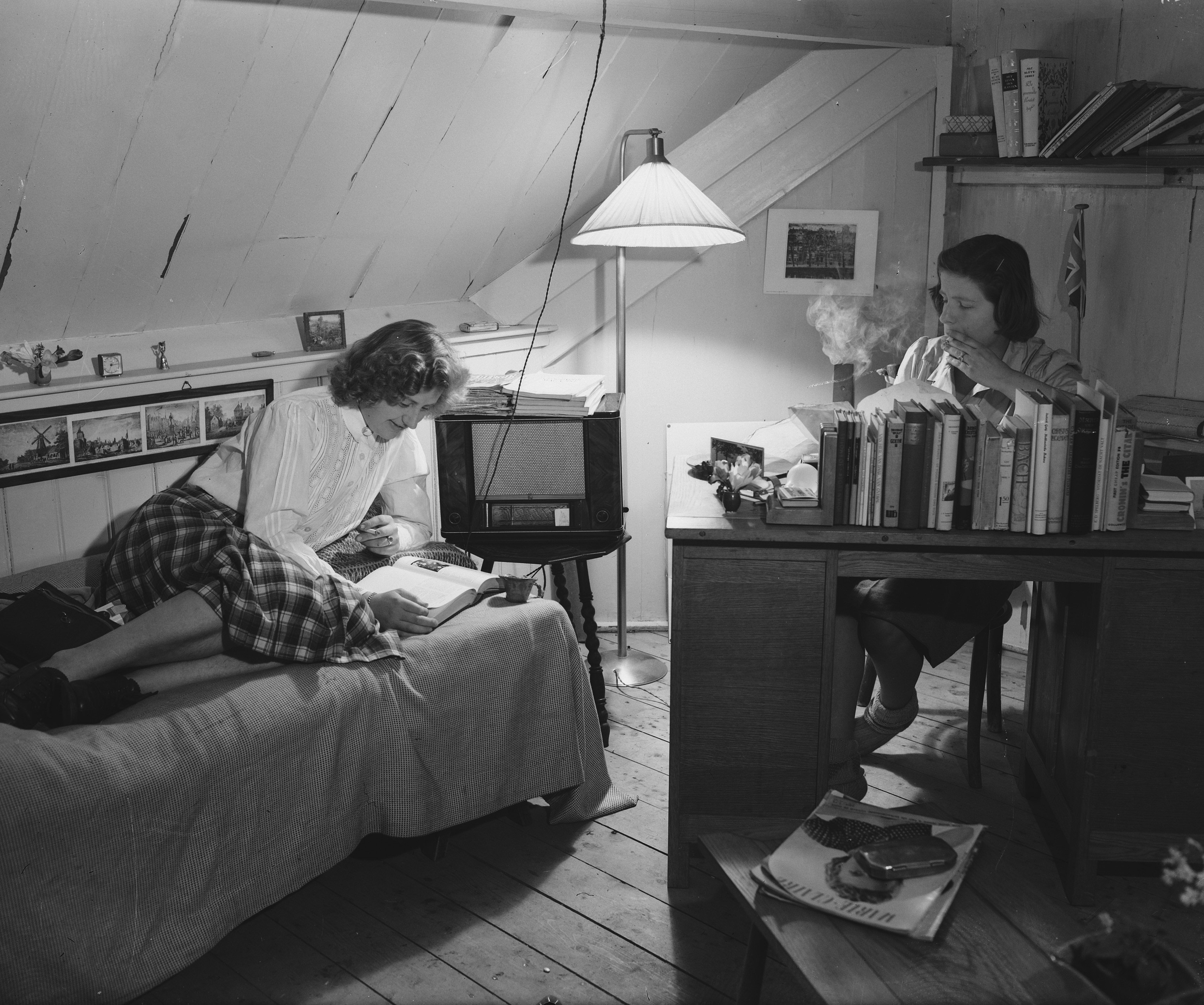
Student room in the attic of the school building, April 1946

The lessons were both theoretical and practical. Garden design as well as vegetable, fruit and flower cultivation were the main topics. Initially the teaching staff only consisted of Jacoba Hingst and Cornelia Pompe. They taught using teaching materials developed by Hingst herself. Hingst taught physics, botany, dendrology, chemistry and microscopy as well as garden drawing. While Pompe took over vegetable, fruit and flower cultivation, basket weaving, oculation and grafting, until she had to give up teaching in 1911 due to a serious illness. New teachers were gradually hired. Since the school started in 1904, trips and excursions to kindergartens, auctions, test sites, shows and experimental gardens were on the program. There were also extensive trips, sometimes lasting several weeks, to gardens and landscaping at home and abroad. Hingst traveled to France with her students, where they toured the surrounding area from the Château de Méridon near Paris. In Italy they visited Frascati, the Vatican Gardens, the Boboli Gardens at Florence's Palazzo Pitti and in England the villa garden.

From 1920 there was a differentiated curriculum for schoolgirls "who only wanted to use their knowledge in their own field" and "girls who wanted to earn a living in the horticultural trade" in order to be able to work as florists, kindergarten teachers, with in-depth professional training in horticulture Parking services or the creation and maintenance of experimental gardens. In the following years, new subjects were offered, such as meteorology, beekeeping and flower arranging courses, typing using the ten-finger system, accounting, plant diseases, knowledge of soil and fertilization. The site also included an apiary.

Unlike other horticultural schools, the "history of garden art" was taught as an independent subject from the beginning. In the 1970s, this subject was taught by Taudin Chabot, who later compiled the first "Open Garden Guide". This was later continued by the "Nederlandse Tuinenstichting", founded in 1980.

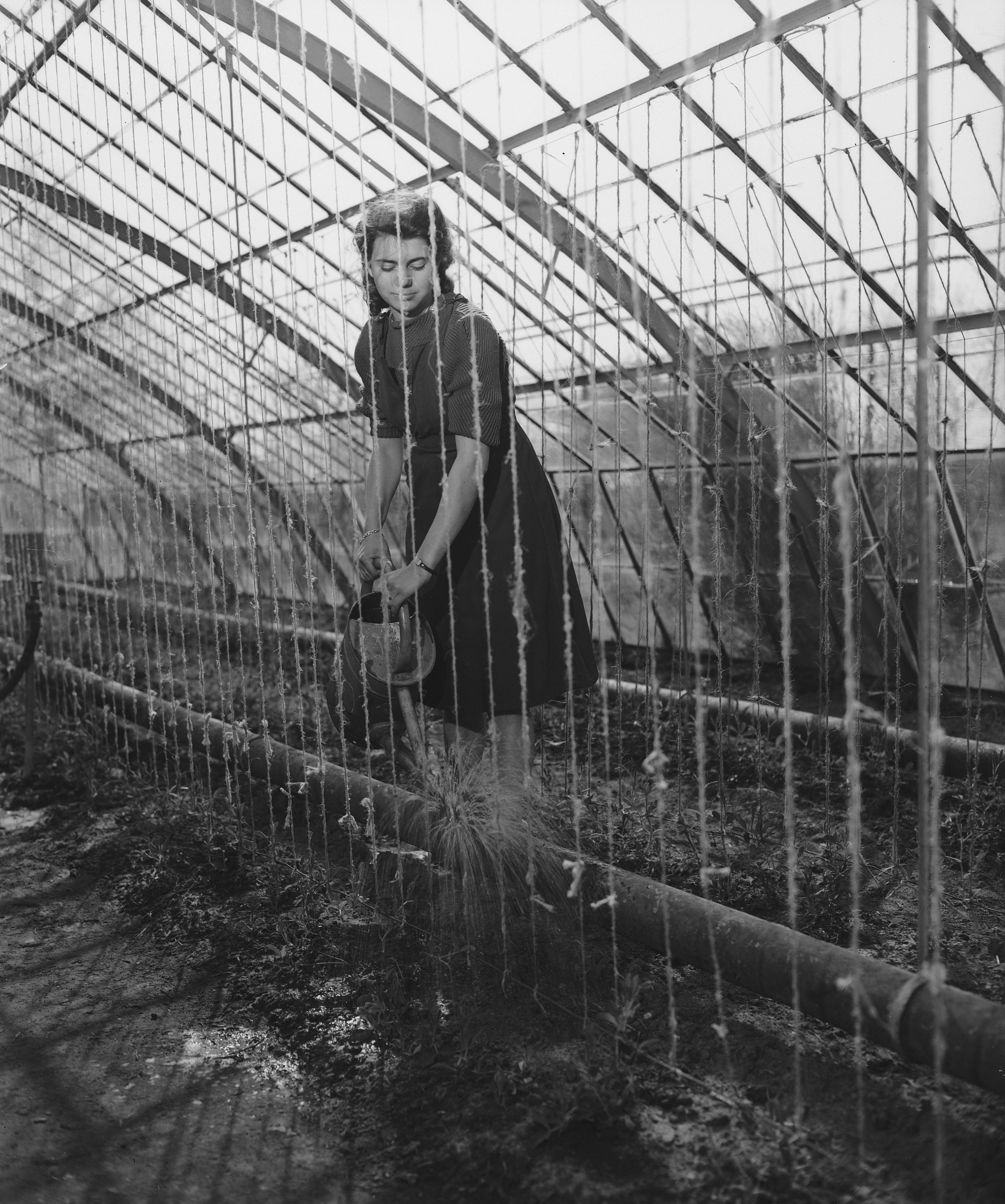
Greenhouse, April 1946

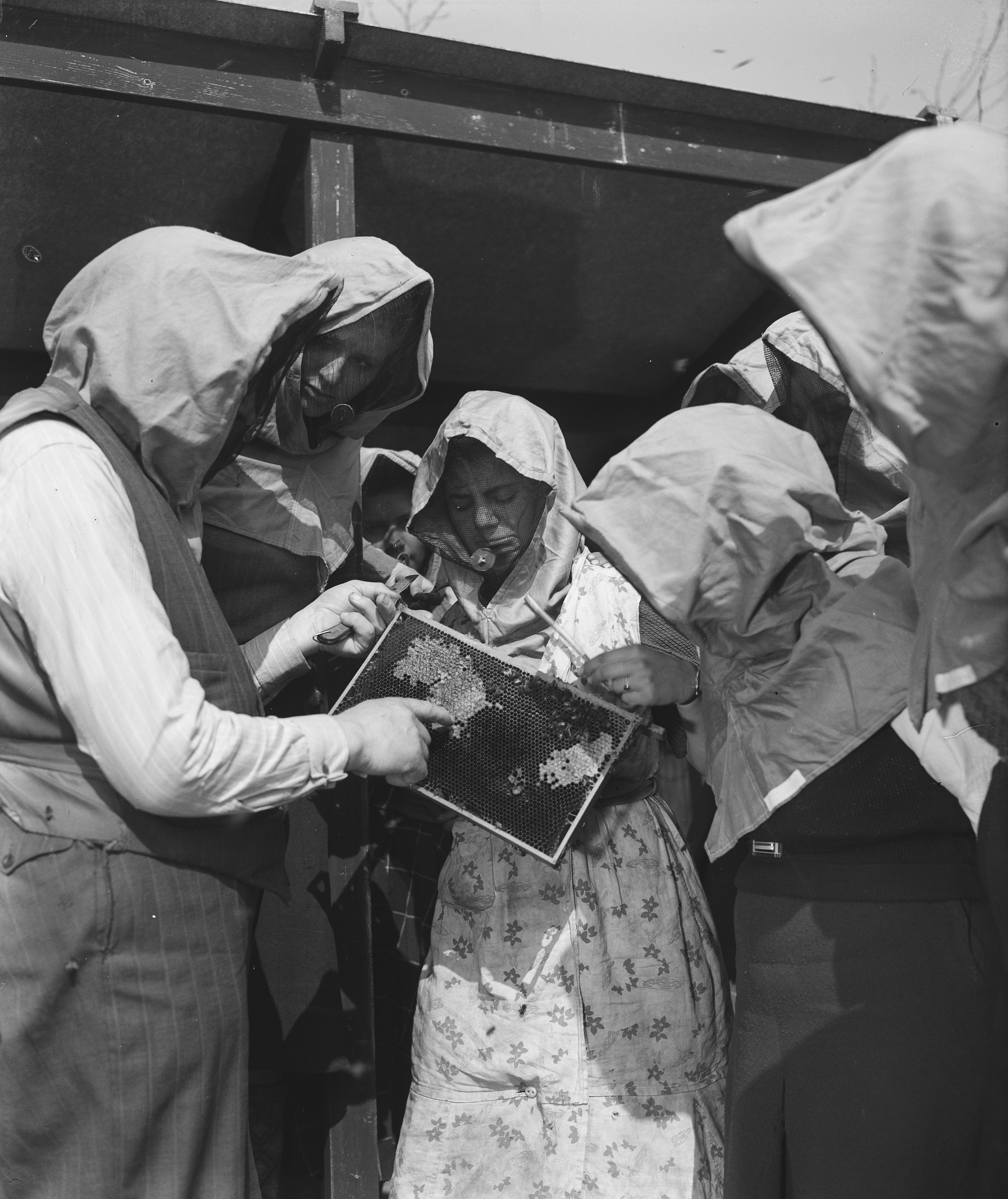
Working with the beehives, April 1946

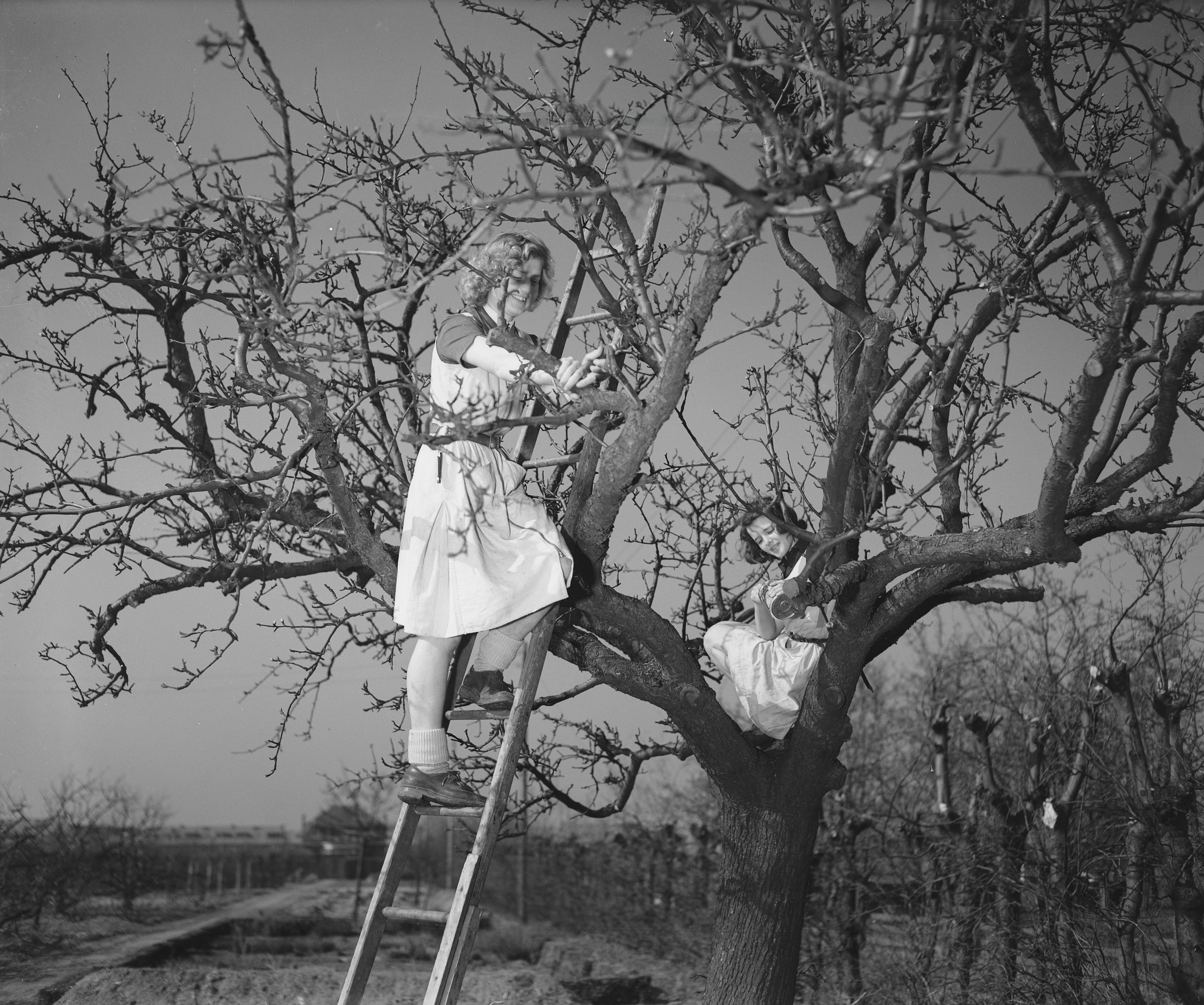
Pruning apple trees and protecting the stumps with red lead, April 1946

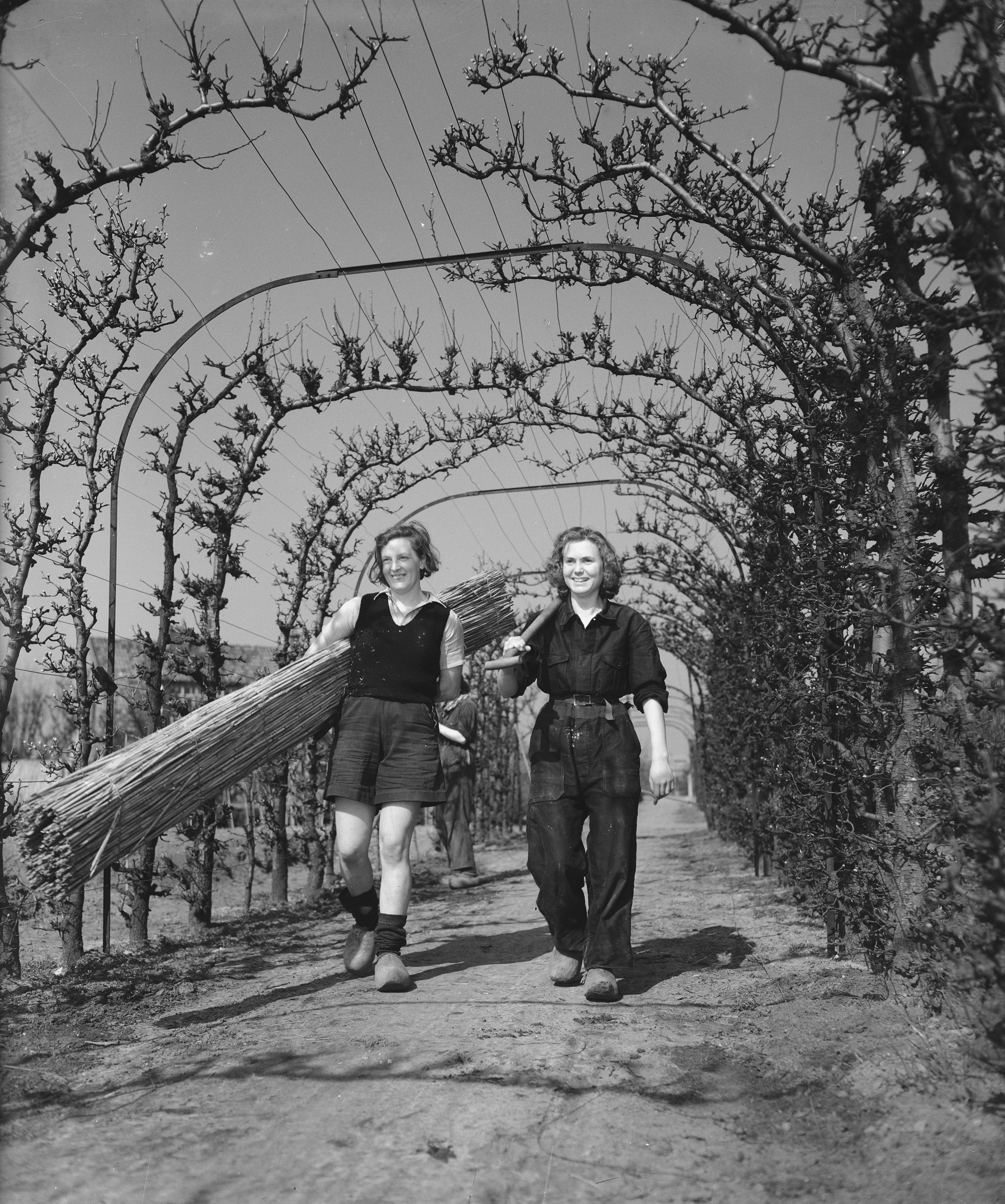
Schoolgirls, April 1946

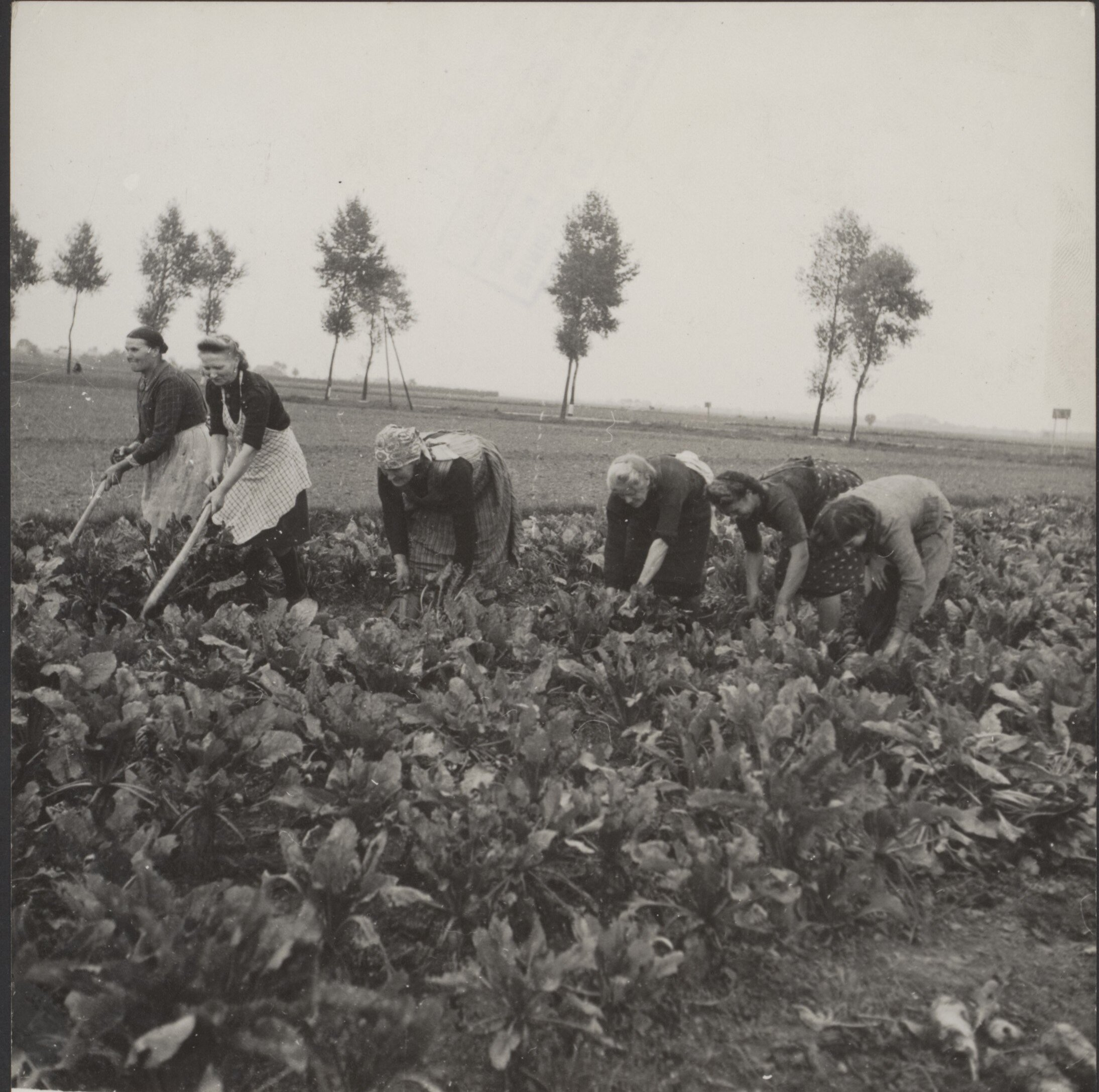
Field work, undated

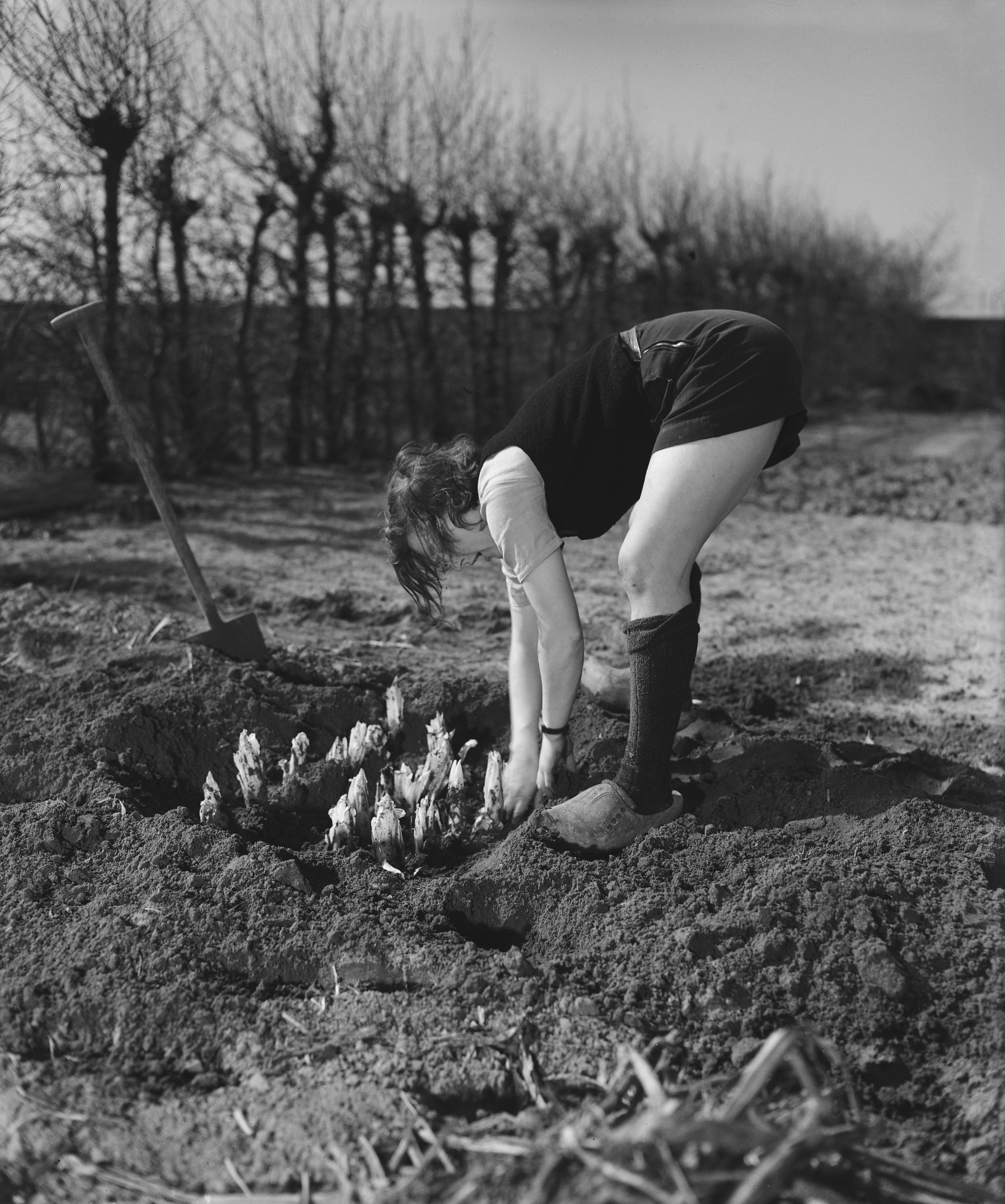
Chicory harvest, April 1946

== Public perception ==
The school's unique position as the only one for girls and young women in this area led to regular interested reporting in newspapers, weekly newspapers and magazines, such as De Amsterdammer, Het Vaderland, Nieuwe Rotterdamsche Courant, Leidsch Dagblad or Eindhovens Dagblad. The school was attended by horticulture specialists from various fields from home and abroad. In 1917, the illustrated magazine Panorama put the school at the center of the April 11 edition with a photo report.

Under the leadership of Hingst and initially Pompe, the school was represented at several exhibitions: The school received an invitation from the "Vereeniging Rijswijks Bloei" to take part in an exhibition on horticultural products, poultry, agriculture and livestock breeding in September 1909. In 1910, a wide selection of the fruits and vegetables grown were exhibited in the "Leids Volkshuis" in Leiden. At the request of the committee of the Dutch Horticultural Council, the school sent five specially made chests full of vegetables to the International Horticultural Exhibition in Brussels in autumn 1910 as an exhibition contribution. In 1913 the school won several prizes at the "De Vrouw 1813–1913" exhibition in Amsterdam. For the "Algemeene coloniale en internationalen tentoonstelling te Semarang" in Java in 1914, the women's committee responsible for the Dutch pavilion "De Vrouw" asked for a concept on the fields of work of Dutch women. Hingst had the landscape architect in Heelsum Louise Baas Becking create a photo report about the work in Huis te Lande and wrote an explanatory brochure.

In 1917, Hingst was awarded honorary membership by the "Koninklijke Maatschappij tot vordering van Tuinbouw en Plantkunde" (KMTP).
