= Vrije Stemmen =

Vrije Stemmen (Free Voices) was the name of several newspapers in Zeeland, Netherlands:

- Vrije Stemmen uit Schouwen-Duiveland (Zierikzee, 1945–47), a temporary name for the Zierikzeesche Nieuwsbode
- Vrije Stemmen uit de Ganzestad, dagblad te Goes (Goes, 1944–45). In 1945 changed its name to:
- Vrije Stemmen. Dagblad voor Zeeland (Goes, 1945–46). In 1946 merged into the Provinciale Zeeuwse Courant.
