= Arjan Paans =

Dutch journalist (1969–2023)

- Born: 1969; Rijnsaterwoude, Netherlands
- Died: 17 January 2023 (aged 53)
- Occupation: Journalist

Arjan Paans (9 July 1969 – 17 January 2023) was a Dutch journalist. Born in 1969 to Boudewijn Paans and Anna, his father was editor-in-chief of VPRO Gids. His mother worked for the Gooi- en Eemlander and Amersfoortse Courant.

Paans started his journalist career at Gooi- en Eemlander where his mother worked. He worked for 23 years in several positions at Algemeen Dagblad. He worked for Algemeen Dagblad between 2003 and 2008 in Berlin, Germany. He became for Algemeen Dagblad deputy editor-in-chief. He was editor-in-chief interior and coordinator Rotterdam at NRC Handelsblad. In 2016 he started working for the regional newspapers of the Telegraaf Media Groep and was among others editor-in-chief of Leidsch Dagblad, Haarlems Dagblad and Gooi- en Eemlander. Paans was editor-in-chief of free newspaper Metro between 2017 and May 2018. In 2021 he became editor-in-chief of Folia.

Paans was married to Loes and they had a son Wolf. Paans died from cancer on 17 January 2023, at the age of 53.
