= Stephen Cawston =

British artist (born 1979)

Stephen Cawston is an artist. He was born 23 January 1979 in Essex and grew up in Thame, Oxfordshire.

== Career ==
Cawston started his working life as a carpenter, which led to him starting a business in building and interior design. Cawston turned to finance as well, but is best known for his art.

He was the owner of a Knightsbridge art gallery, dealing in Contemporary art. Here he also took on art interns to learn the business of galleries and give art lessons. Most of their clientele were seeking expensive, fine art.

Cawston is also an artist and has an extensive client base, selling to CEO's, celebrities and entrepreneurs.

One of Cawston's famous paintings Snow White and the Seven Dwarfs had a feature story on the US Celebrity TV show E News. Which also appeared in Vanity Fair, USA Today, Us Weekly and Elle.com

McLaren Racing; Cawston was a contracted artist to McLaren Racing.

=== Conceptual Contemporary Art ===
Cawston closed his Knightsbridge gallery in 2016, and ceased all his commercial art to concentrate on a collection of conceptual art. He has been planning and sourcing for this collection of sculptures for six years. The title of the piece being: "The Value of Life in Gold". The piece appeared in the Gstaad My Love magazine 2019.

=== Golden Skeleton Sculptures ===
The Value of Life in Gold series of sculptures has now taken the world by storm. These original contemporary artworks are unique, blending figurative surrealism, life, death and beauty. The sculptures have been exhibited at serious international art fairs, Miami Context 2018, Art Nocturne Knocke 2019 with huge public and art critic success. Some of the pieces are in serious art collections located in Saudi Arabia, Dubai, Russia and Europe. New sculptures will be exhibited at Dubai art fair, and The Venice Biennale. The collection can be seen in Mayfair Life, Prime Resi, Luxury Interiors Magazine, Art Nocturne Knocke Brochure, Country Life and Battersea Life.

=== Secondary Market ===
Cawston's first important step into the secondary market took place on the 18 December 2021, with Hessink's major auction house who asked for the collaboration, stories seen in many publications, including DeStentor newspaper. Cawston was said to say ‘the secondary market is a great place to be, if it works out’. He needn’t of worried, this was a major success with auctions sales of €326,000 + buyers premium, on two sculptures. With one sculpture not reaching its reserve.

Cawston was honoured to be asked to be interviewed for the important ‘Family Office Magazine' in their Autumn issue 2022. This interview was then taken up by Art Miami Magazine.

== Charity ==
Cawston has raised funds by donating paintings to the Born Free Foundation, Breakthrough Breast Cancer, and The Bob Champion Cancer Trust.
