= AutoTrack =

- Developer: Savoy Computing
- Operating system: Windows (XP / Vista / 7 / 8)
- Type: Transportation Planning and Design
- License: Software license agreement
- Website: www.savoycomputing.com

AutoTrack is a vehicle swept path analysis software program used for analysing the movements of steered and wheeled vehicles including cars, trucks, trams, aircraft and other more specialist vehicles such as fork lift trucks, wheelchairs and access platforms. AutoTrack was the world's first swept path analysis software program, originally being jointly developed by TRL (the UK's Transport Research Laboratory) and British engineering consultants, Travers Morgan (acquired by Symonds in 1995 who are now part of Capita Symonds, in the form of TRACK. The term track refers to the tracking of a vehicle's simulated movements in relation to geometry, based upon vehicle dimensions, chassis and steering specification. AutoTrack has many similarities and performs the same function as the alternative swept path analysis program AutoTURN, which is developed by Transoft Solutions, Inc..

AutoTrack is generally used by transportation engineers, architects and planners for the analysis and design of highways, intersections, buildings and other facilities to check that provision has been made for the space and geometry required to manoeuvre specified design vehicles. A design vehicle may be a real vehicle modelled within the software's computer environment but will often be a virtual vehicle that does not exist in real life, rather being indicative of the type and configuration of vehicle that the final design is expected to accommodate. Design vehicles are commonly specified by the relevant governing body that also controls the specification for which the design must conform.

The AutoTrack range is divided into modules that service the Road, Rail and Airports industries and operates within several different CAD systems such as AutoCAD by Autodesk, Microstation by Bentley Systems, Bricscad by Bricsys (a former member of the IntelliCAD Technology Consortium) and standalone in Microsoft Windows. When the software was first developed it initially ran as a DOS-based application and when it was ported to operate within AutoCAD, it was given the name AutoTrack. The software, initially developed for consulting purposes, was sold commercially and following the demise of the original company, a management buy out pre-empted the incorporation of Savoy Computing Services Ltd. in 1996. Two of the surviving directors of Savoy Computing were involved with the original development of TRACK.

In August, 2013 Autodesk acquired the technology assets of Savoy Computing Services Ltd, including the AutoTrack technology. Autodesk subsequently released Autodesk Vehicle Tracking, which directly superseded AutoTrack in November, 2013. At this point Savoy Computing Services ceased trading and the AutoTrack software product is since no longer supported.

== Brief history of AutoTrack ==
- 1988 – AutoTrack introduced "lock to lock" time as a critical factor used in the calculation of manoeuvrability of steered vehicles
- 1991 – AutoTrack archived all design data within the "parent" CAD drawing
- 1992 – AutoTrack introduced modelling of tram and light rail vehicle movements
- 1997 – First swept path program to calculate effective axle positions from vehicle dimensions
- 1999 – AutoTrack introduced AutoDrive (a mouse point and click system that calculates possible movements from one vehicle position to the next)
- 1999 – Grip editing was introduced to enable the editing of vehicle paths instead of their deletion
- 2002 – Recording of scaled animations containing multiple vehicles was introduced, with a movie file being able to be recorded from within the program
- 2004 – A standalone version that operated in Microsoft Windows was introduced for engineers without CAD systems
- 2007 – AutoTrack became the first 64-bit swept path analysis software program
- 2013 – AutoTrack acquired by Autodesk

== See also ==
- AutoTURN
- Turning radius
