= Thomas von der Dunk =

Dutch historian and writer

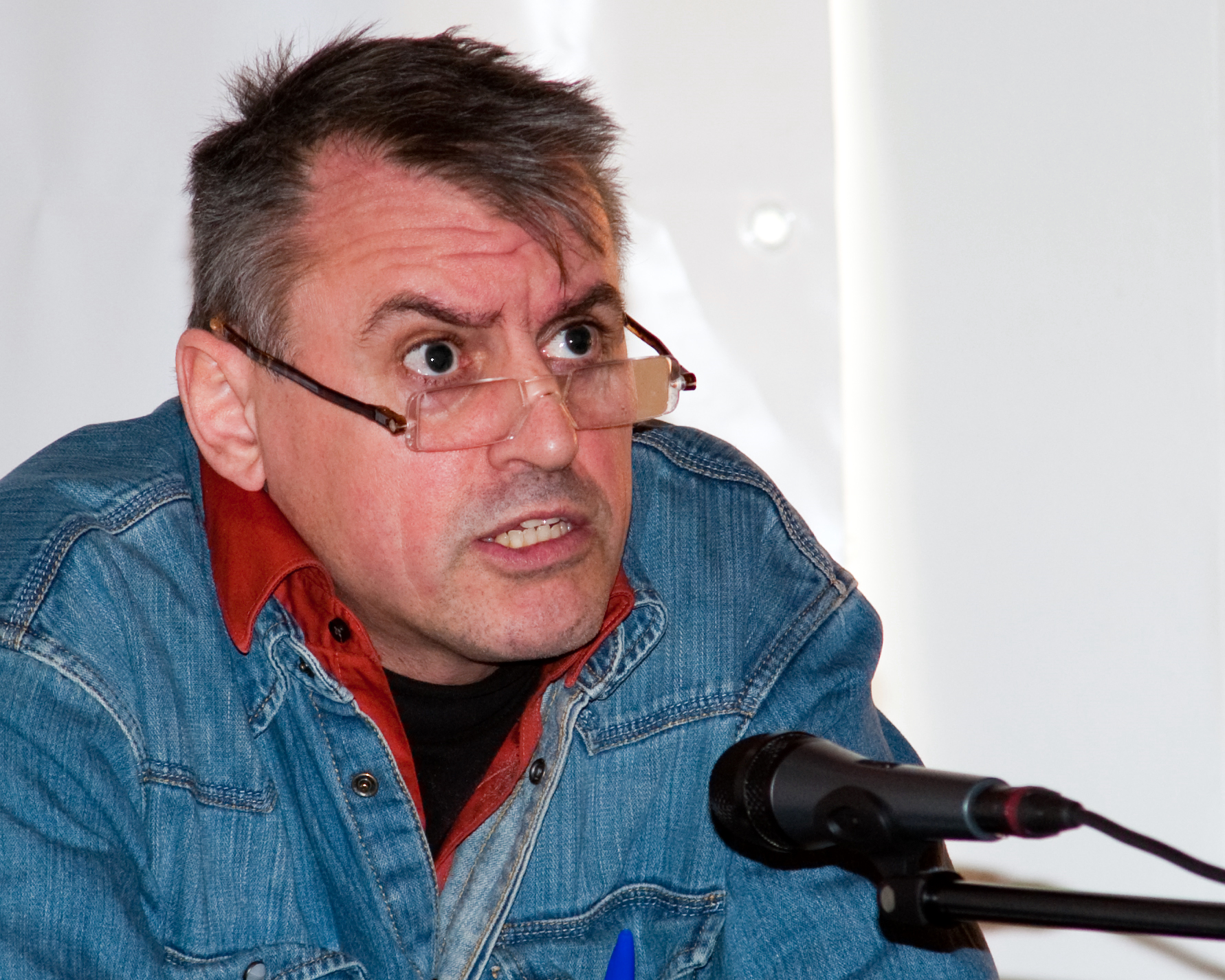
- Von der Dunk, 2010
- Born: 2 July 1961 (age 64); Soestdijk, Netherlands
- Occupations: Columnist, writer

Thomas von der Dunk (born 2 July 1961 in Soestdijk) is a Dutch cultural historian, writer, and columnist who has written for de Volkskrant and HP/De Tijd.

Von der Dunk was raised in Bilthoven, and from 1979 to 1988 studied art history at the University of Amsterdam. He was a doctoral candidate in the history department at Leiden University (1989–1993), and received his Ph.D. in 1994, having written a dissertation on the political and ideological characteristics of the cult of monuments in the Holy Roman Empire between the fourteenth and the eighteenth century. He worked at Utrecht University from 1994 to 1999, and from 1999 to 2002 again in Leiden.

Since 2002 he has been working as a freelance writer and pundit. From 2010 to 2011 he wrote a regular column for HP/De Tijd, but was fired in March 2011, and is now an online columnist for de Volkskrant and a columnist for the regional paper De Gelderlander.

In April 2011, Von der Dunk was to give the annual Willem Arondéus lecture, organized by the States-Provincial of North Holland. The ruling Christian Democratic Appeal-People's Party for Freedom and Democracy government coalition, supported by the Party for Freedom, cancelled the lecture, asserting that his lecture was too partisan. However, the Christian Democratic Appeal and People's Party for Freedom and Democracy later decided to let Von der Dunk give his lecture anyway.
