= Pieter de Looze =

Pieter de Looze (23 September 1811–14 April 1881) was a book and newspaper printer, publisher, and seller in Zierikzee, best known as founder of the Zierikzeesche Nieuwsbode.

== Career and aftermath ==
The publishing and book selling firm was started in the first half of the 19th century by Pieter de Looze at his residential address, Melkmarkt 2 (corner Schuithaven). In 1844 Looze founded the Zierikzeesche Nieuwsbode that he published and printed. Pieter de Looze was succeeded by his son Adriaan Johannes (also spelled as Johannis) de Looze.

In 1869 the print operation, including the Zierikzeesche Nieuwsbode, was acquired by Ochtman, later known as Lakenman en Ochtman, recently shortened to LNO. In 1998 the Zierikzeesche Nieuwsbode was acquired by and merged into the Provinciale Zeeuwse Courant.

The property on Melkmart 2 in Zierikzee is still mixed use: commercial and residential.

== Personal and family ==
Pieter de Looze was born, married and died in Zierikzee. He was born on Monday, 23 September 1811.

Aged 24, on 4 May 1836 he married Catharina Louwerina Feij, who was 6 years his senior. Catharina hailed from Vlissingen. Their son, Adriaan Johannes de Looze (1847–1927), would later continue the family business. When Adriaan was only 8 years old, on 23 May 1855, Catharina de Looze died. Pieter de Looze died on 14 April 1881.

Adriaan Looze's son, Pieter de Looze (1874–1956), was a Dutch reformed minister.
