= Hoornsche Courant =

The Hoornsche Courant was a newspaper that appeared in the Dutch city of Hoorn. It was founded in 1858. By 1872, it appeared twice per week. In 1869, Dutch historian Willem Jan Frans Nuyen surmised that while the newspaper was ostensibly edited by "non-preachers", it still contained articles that, considering the hateful tone against Catholics, were written by a (Protestant) preacher.

According to historian Jos Leenders, the newspaper started by echoing the opinions of the city government, but by 1865 declared it would be more of a voice for the people, and began publishing letters to the editor and criticizing the county government. Calling itself "general", it was, practically speaking, liberal.
