= AutoTURN =

CAD software

- Developer: Transoft Solutions Inc.
- Initial release: 1991; 34 years ago
- Stable release: 12.0 / April 22, 2024; 19 months ago
- Operating system: Windows
- Platform: Bentley Systems MicroStation, Autodesk AutoCAD, Bricsys BricsCAD
- Type: CAD
- License: proprietary
- Website: www.transoftsolutions.com/autoturn

AutoTURN is a third-party computer-aided design (CAD) software released for the AutoCAD, MicroStation, BricsCAD, IntelliCAD (ZwCAD) platforms, developed and sold by Transoft Solutions Inc. The software is made for use on computers that run Microsoft Windows operating system and is available as a 2D or 3D (Pro) version. A web based version of the software, AutoTURN Online is available on macOS and Windows operating systems through a browser integration in Vectorworks. Among other things, it analyses and simulates swept path vehicle maneuvers.

== History ==
- AutoTURN was originally developed for Transoft Solutions Inc. in 1991. It was designed as the practical application of a University of Calgary civil engineering graduate studies thesis by Milton Carrasco. The first version was released for use on Autodesk's AutoCAD Release 9. The software has improved to reflect the needs of engineers and designers in the transportation sector. AutoTURN is used to analyze road and site design projects including intersections, roundabouts, bus terminals, loading bays, parking lots, or any on/off-street assignments involving vehicle access checks, clearances, and swept path maneuvers.
- In 1992, version 2.0 was released and was the first release compatible with Bentley Systems MicroStation Unix. The libraries of vehicles available for swept path simulation and analysis was limited and vehicle simulations could only be carried out in a forward direction. AutoTURN 2.0 was compatible with AutoCAD Release 10 and then Unix version of MicroStation V 3.4.
- Version 3.0 was released in 1993, less than one year after version 2.0. Version 3.0 includes many upgrades over its predecessor, including larger vehicle libraries, and a supplement for use with aircraft (this supplement would become expanded into a separate software named AutoTURN Aircraft in 1995). Among other improvements, 3.0 enabled users to run simultaneous simulations of two vehicles in forward and reverse directions in a stop-motion (frame-by-frame) animation. Simulations could only be done from pre-drawn paths.
- In 2000, the release of version 4.0 accounted for international users; it was the first version available in multiple languages. Among other improvements, version 4.0 includes expanded international libraries of vehicles. To incorporate the many new abilities, it was necessary to make significant changes to the program's visual user interface and functions. The change in interface includes a new toolbar. Generate simulation tools were introduced so users did not first have to draw the vehicle path to generate a simulation. Version 4 introduced the concepts of Active Path and Active Simulation allowing for repeating various functions without repeat reselecting of objects. Like the prior versions, 4.0 contained a supplement for aircraft.
- Version 5.0's release in 2004, among many other functions, introduces heuristic algorithms for tracking, creating simulations on spline elements, and improved layer management for simulations. The standard vehicle library file was changed to a searchable database of vehicles based on international or custom standards. Adding to those features version 5.1 introduces the ability to set steering linkage ratios between the front and rear steering axle groups, and to continuously loop simulations.
- The 2008 release of version 6.0 adds more simulation functions. It builds on version 5.1's abilities to loop simulations by adding the ability to export simulations to InVision (a separate software application) to create video clips. Plan view and chamfered vehicles can be used for simulations and or modified in this version.
- In 2011, Transoft adds 3D abilities to the original AutoTURN product. The ability to view clearance issues on the horizontal and vertical planes provides engineers with a more complete picture of their project environments. Transoft engineers conducted several years of research to add the 3D ability to the back-end code of the software.
- In April 2014, version 9.0 was released to the transport engineering sector. A version upgrade was released in May 2015.
- Version 10 was released in mid Q2 2016. In this major release, Pro version includes ability to evaluate multiple routes that avoid specified exclusion zones (e.g., buildings, curbs, etc.) and then generate movements with different vehicles on selected routes using a proprietary artificial intelligence algorithm. Version 10.2 was released in January 2018.
- In March 2020, version 11 was released. It adds cycles (bicycles, cargo bikes, trikes and various adapted bikes) into the software for the first time allowing engineers and planners to design a more inclusive cycle infrastructure.

== Release history ==
Version	Date released	Comments
1.0	Nov. 1991	Initial release, available for Autodesk's AutoCAD Release 9
2.0	July 1992	First version to run on Bentley Systems' MicroStation (Unix)
3.0	May 1993	First version to include an aircraft supplement
4.0	Oct. 2000	Graphical-based simulations
4.1	Aug. 2002	AutoCAD MDI compliant, 2002, MicroStation V8, Windows 95 98 NT 2000 XP compatible
4.2	Jun. 2003	Chinese language support
5.0	Nov. 2004	Introduced heuristic algorithms for tracking
5.1	Apr. 2006	Ability to set Steering Linkage ratios between the front and rear steering axle groups
6.0	Apr. 2008	Library database search, customizable vehicles, InVision support
6.1	Apr. 2009	SQL Express Database engine, AutoCAD 2010 and MicroStation V8i compatibility, Microsoft Window Vista – 64-bit compatibility
7.0	Feb. 2010	Specialized transport systems support and complimentary additional functions
8.0	Sep. 2011	Pro version introduced with the capability to model 3D vehicle swept path envelopes
8.1	May 2012	
8.2	May 2013	
9.0	Jun. 2014	Sight Lines, Path Control, Speed Profile Reports, Vehicle Loads, New Vehicles, Special Transport update, Path Preview, Grading Templates
9.1	May 2015	
10.0	May 2016	Pro version adds IntelliPath artificial intelligence to automate vehicle path trajectories and perform route analyses for vehicle circulation plans
10.1	May 2017	Adds intelligent vehicle orientation detection, maximum swept path width calculation and new body articulated vehicles types. Pro version includes custom vehicle profiles for 3D, 3D load shape extrusion and new 3D special transport vehicles.
10.2	Jan. 2018	Adds vehicle creation enhancements, new method of reversing tractor-trailer combos and standard vehicle library updates. Pro version includes manufacturer-based vehicle libraries and improvements to IntelliPath feature.
11	Mar. 2020	Includes many improvements to existing features to improve productivity. Improved vehicle browsing, layer management and vehicle library updates. Pro version includes ability to analyze the swept paths of a variety of bicycles and the inspect simulation tool.
12	Apr. 2024	Includes an improved algorithm for simulating vehicles with large steering lock angles and an updated vehicle library. Pro version adds a beta feature to create a 3D rendering of a simulation.

== See also ==
- Comparison of computer-aided design software
