= Zierikzeesche Nieuwsbode =

- Type: 2 to 4 issues per week
- Format: Initially micro format
- Founder: Pieter de Looze
- Founded: 18 August 1844
- Ceased publication: 1998
- Language: Dutch language
- Headquarters: Zierikzee, Netherlands

The Zierikzeesche Nieuwsbode (1844–1998) was a newspaper in Zierikzee, Netherlands. Throughout its history, it was published 2 to 4 times per week.

== History ==
The Zierikzeesche Nieuwsbode was founded by Pieter de Looze, who was a book and newspaper printer, publisher, and seller in Zierikzee, operating from his home at Melkmarkt 2. During the years 1849–1861 some of the content of the Nieuwsbode was reprinted in the United States as the Sheboygan Nieuwsbode, for Zeelanders taking interest in news from home.

Pieter de Looze was succeeded by his son Adriaan Johannes de Looze as printer and publisher of the Zierikzeesche Nieuwsbode. In 1869 the print operation, including the Zierikzeesche Nieuwsbode, was acquired by Ochtman, later known as Lakenman en Ochtman, then shortened to LNO. By 1 June 1889, the Nieuwsbode had been driven out of business and taken over the business of its older rival, the Zierikzeesche Courant (founded 1979).

Due to World War II, the publication ceased in 1944. As the newspaper had been relatively cooperating with the occupation, it could not be published under own name after the war was over. Instead, it appeared as Vrije Stemmen van Schouwen-Duiveland (free voices of Schouwen-Duiveland). In 1947 the publication could return to its original name.

In 1998 the Zierikzeesche Nieuwsbode merged into the Provinciale Zeeuwse Courant and the Nieuwsbode ceased to exist.

== Publication ==
- 1844–1846: 3 issues per week, Pieter de Looze
- 1846–1869: 2 issues, Pieter de Looze then Adriaan de Looze
- 1869–1944: 3 issues, Ochtman then Lakenman & Ochtman
- 1945–1947: 3 issues, temporarily titled Vrije Stemmen van Schouwen-Duiveland, Lakenman & Ochtman
- 1947–1998: 4 issues, Lakenman & Ochtman then LNO
