= Barneveldse Krant =

Dutch newspaper

- Type: Daily newspaper
- Publisher: Wiljo Klein Wolterink
- Editor-in-chief: Norbert Witjes
- Founded: 6 October 1871
- City: Barneveld, Gelderland
- Website: barneveldsekrant.nl

The Barneveldse Krant is a local daily newspaper in the Netherlands. It is printed, published, and distributed by Royal BDU in Barneveld. The newspaper is printed six times per week, with a focus on advertisements on Thursday and special weekend pages on Saturday. The Thursday edition is free of charge. It became a daily only in 1967, with 5 issues a week at that time.

== History ==
=== 19th century ===
The newspaper first appeared as a weekly newspaper on 6 October 1871 as the Barneveldsche Courant, published and edited by Gerrit Boonstra. It would initially be published on Fridays.

By 1895 or earlier the publication day of the week had moved to Thursday in the afternoon. An issue of the newspaper was 6 guilder cents, a subscription in town 50 cents per 3 months. At 13 weeks times 6 cents, the quarterly subscription saved 28 cents versus single issues.

=== 20th century ===
During the Second World War, editor-in-chief Aris Smit Jr. refused to print some National Socialist articles, including that of the publicist Max Blokzijl (executed after the war), and had to pay penalties in consequence. However, he also turned in a letter to the Reich Commissioner of the Press Department against an underground paper.

As Smit eventually became too compliant with the oppressor for the circumstances, after the war Smit was imprisoned for half a year and he received a 15-year professional ban. The publication of the newspaper was also temporarily ceased but was renewed after it became apparent that the publisher had printed for the Dutch underground.

By 1947 or earlier the newspaper was published twice a week. On 1 January 1967 publication frequency was increased from 3 times per week to 5 times per week.

=== 21st century ===
In 2002 the editors of the newspaper received a nomination for Dutch Daily Journalistic Award for their coverage of the foot-and-mouth disease that was rampant at the time. In September 2005, the newspaper switched to the tabloid format and introduced color printing for the entire newspaper.

In 2006 the publisher of the newspaper BDU filed a lawsuit against the free newspaper Barneveld Vandaag, published by Wegener Publishing House and published four times a week, as BDU considered it misleading that it called itself a daily newspaper. BDU won the case.

== Associates ==
=== Editor-in-chief ===
- Aris Smit Jr. (1941–1945?)
- R.H. Hardeman (late 1940s)
- Dick Hörst (1960s)
- Dirk Rebel
- Hans Papenburg (2000-2005)
- Jur van Ginkel (2005-2007)
- Jos Scholten (2007–2011)
- Daan Bleuel (2011–2013)
- Norbert Witjes (since 2013)

=== Publisher ===
- Gerrit Boonstra (1871–?)
- Dirk Rebel
- Wiljo Klein Wolterink (current in 2018)
