= De Gooi- en Eemlander =

Dutch newspaper

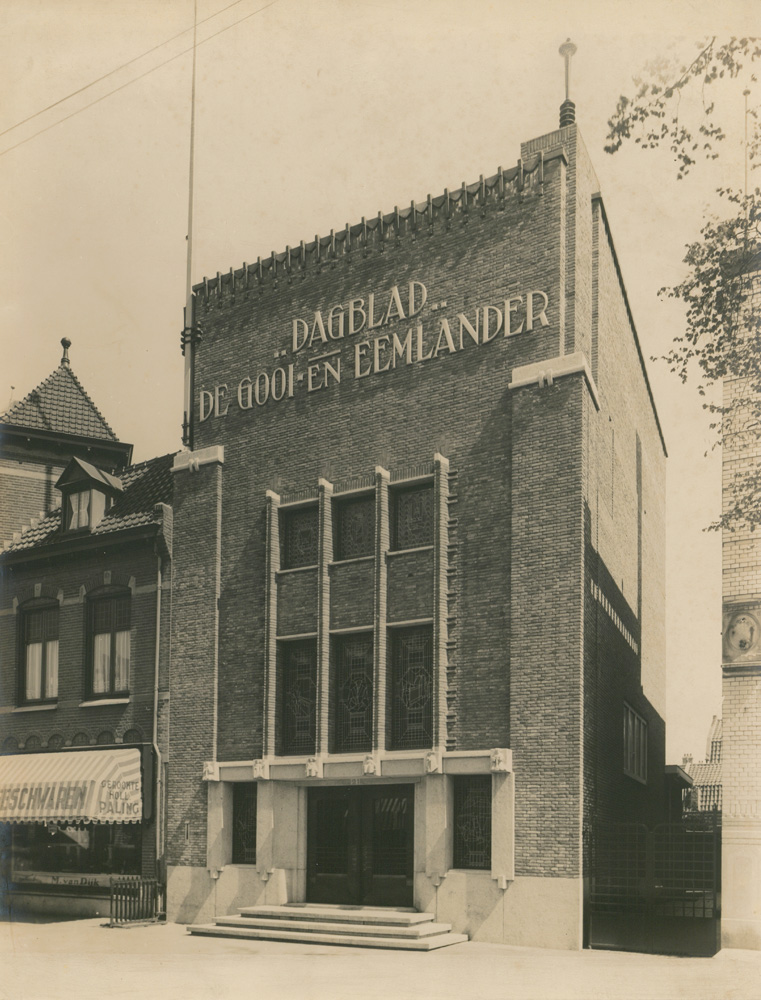
Historic office building of the newspaper in Hilversum, built by 1928. Designed by J. van Laren.

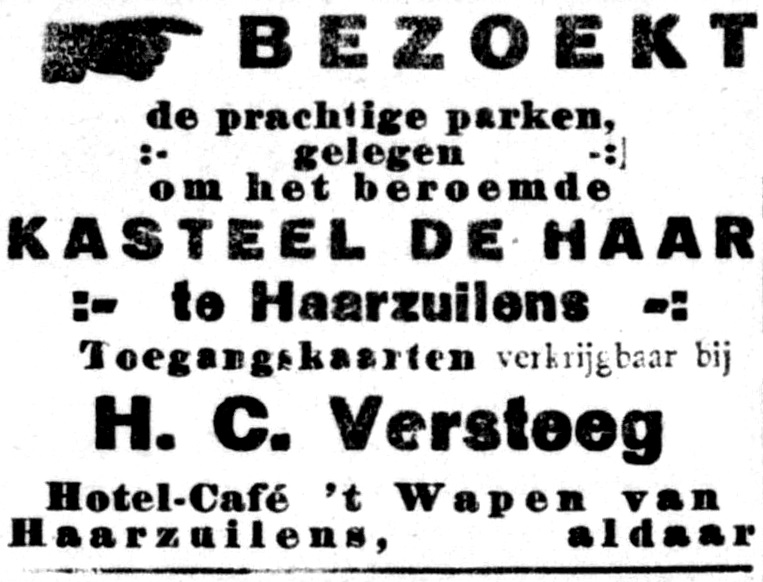
A 1915 advertisement in the De Gooi- en Eemlander

De Gooi- en Eemlander is a Dutch regional daily newspaper distributed in the Gooi region and some nearby towns and villages in Utrecht.

== History ==
=== 19th century: Foundation and first decades under Geradts ===
The newspaper started as the Gooisch Nieuwsblad in 1871 by Johan Geradts. It was initially printed on a small hand press in an attic in Hilversum.

In 1900 the already larger press of the newspaper burned down and the printing company of the brothers Klene started to print the newspaper. Later in 1900 the aging Johan Geradts sold the newspaper to the Klene printing firm.

=== 20th century: Steady growth and initial decline under Klene ===
From 1901 the newspaper was published twice a week. In 1923 the De Gooi- en Eemlander turned daily. From 1933 through 1939 Dutch poet Gabriël Smit was editor-in-chief. In 1940 De Gooi- en Eemlander had nearly 19,000 subscriptions.

During World War II the newspaper met the demands of the German occupation. This led to the paper being tainted with collaboration, and after liberation, its publication was forbidden. After reappearance, the newspaper grew along with the rapid growth of Hilversum in the 1950s and 1960s.

In 1965 Guus Pikkemaat replaced Jan Temmink as the editor-in-chief. Pikkemaat remained the editor well into the 1980s. In 1996 Telegraaf Media Groep bought the newspaper.

=== 21st century: Rapid decline under TMG and Mediahuis ===
The newspaper suffers from a declining and aging readership and an editorial staff that has been cut to the bare minimum. Most functions of the newspaper production have moved to the somewhat larger Noordhollands Dagblad in Alkmaar. After TMG was acquired by Mediahuis, these functions moved to De Telegraaf offices in Amsterdam.

De Gooi- en Eemlander's affiliated newspaper in Almere, Almere Vandaag, folded in 2017. Its remaining assets were acquired by BDU Media.

In 2018 Hugo Schneider was editor-in-chief for the De Gooi- en Eemlander, Noordhollands Dagblad, and other Mediahuis regional newspapers. In 2023, Corine de Vries is editor-in-chief.
