= BN DeStem =

Dutch newspaper

BN DeStem is a Dutch regional newspaper. It focuses on the Western part of North Brabant and Zeeland, and originated in 1998 through the merger of the Brabants Nieuwsblad (located in Roosendaal) and De Stem (located in Breda). The circulation is 114,479 copies (2009). A recent editor-in-chief was Johan van Uffelen (2001–2015).

BN DeStem covers the western part of North Brabant. The newspapers Brabants Dagblad (in the east) and Eindhovens Dagblad (in the southeast) cover the other parts of the province. These titles do not compete.

On 6 February 2007 the newspaper switched to a tabloid format. BN DeStem exists in several editions and is distributed in the regions Breda, Etten-Leur, Oosterhout, Bergen op Zoom, Roosendaal, Moerdijk, and Zeeland.
