= Tubantia (newspaper) =

Dutch newspaper

De Twentsche Courant Tubantia, commonly known as Tubantia, is a Dutch daily newspaper owned by DPG Media. In 2016 it was distributed in 91,313 copies in the regions of Twente and Regge valley. Its headquarters are in Enschede.
