= De Gelderlander =

Dutch newspaper

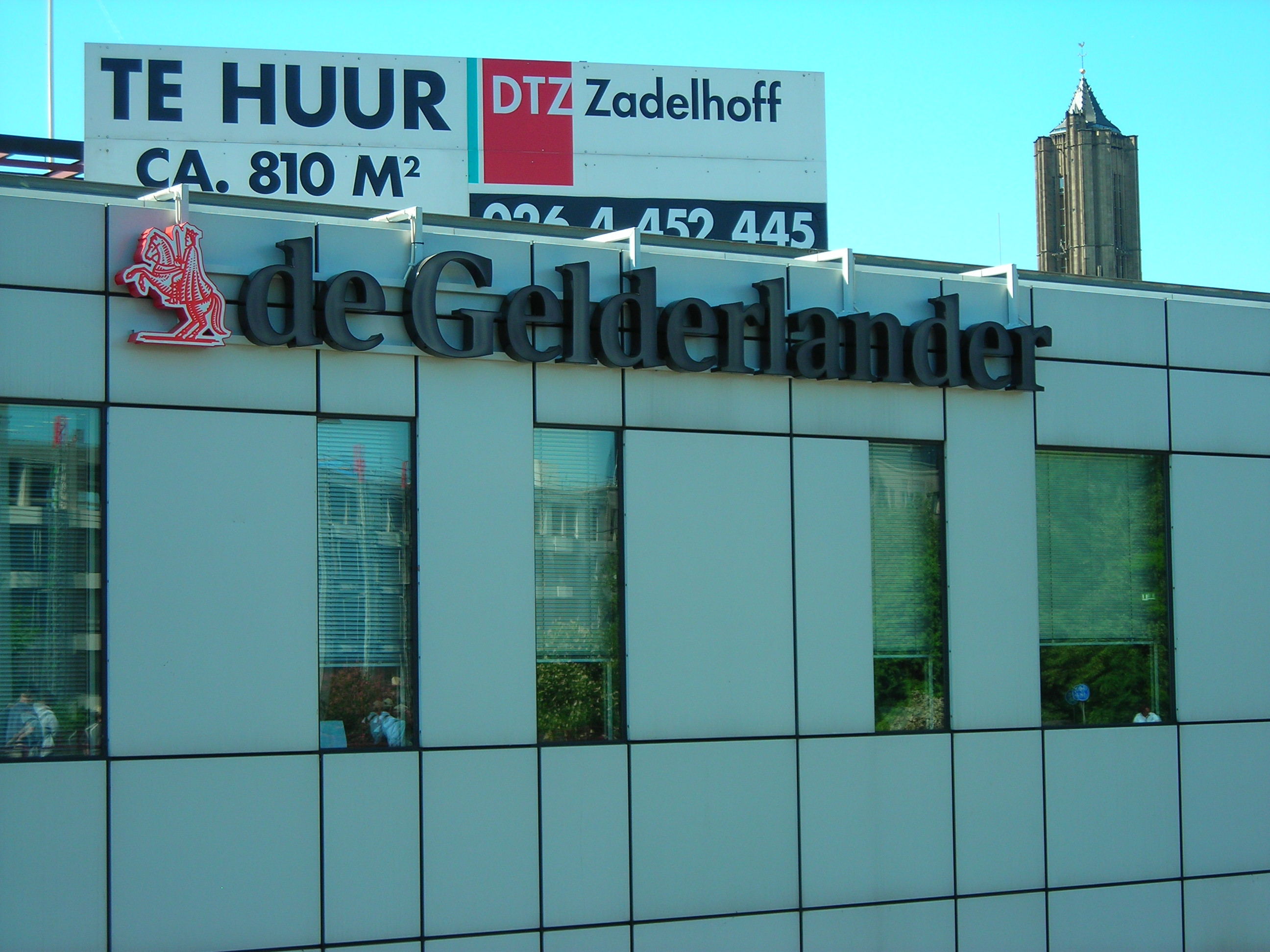
Newspaper logo on its building

De Gelderlander (founded 1848) is a Dutch daily newspaper focused on Gelderland and immediate surroundings. It is published in Nijmegen by the Belgian DPG Media.

De Gelderlander evolved in 1848 from the Nijmegen biweekly newspaper De Batavier, published from 1843 to 1845.

== Contributors ==
- Thomas von der Dunk
