= Eindhovens Dagblad =

Dutch newspaper

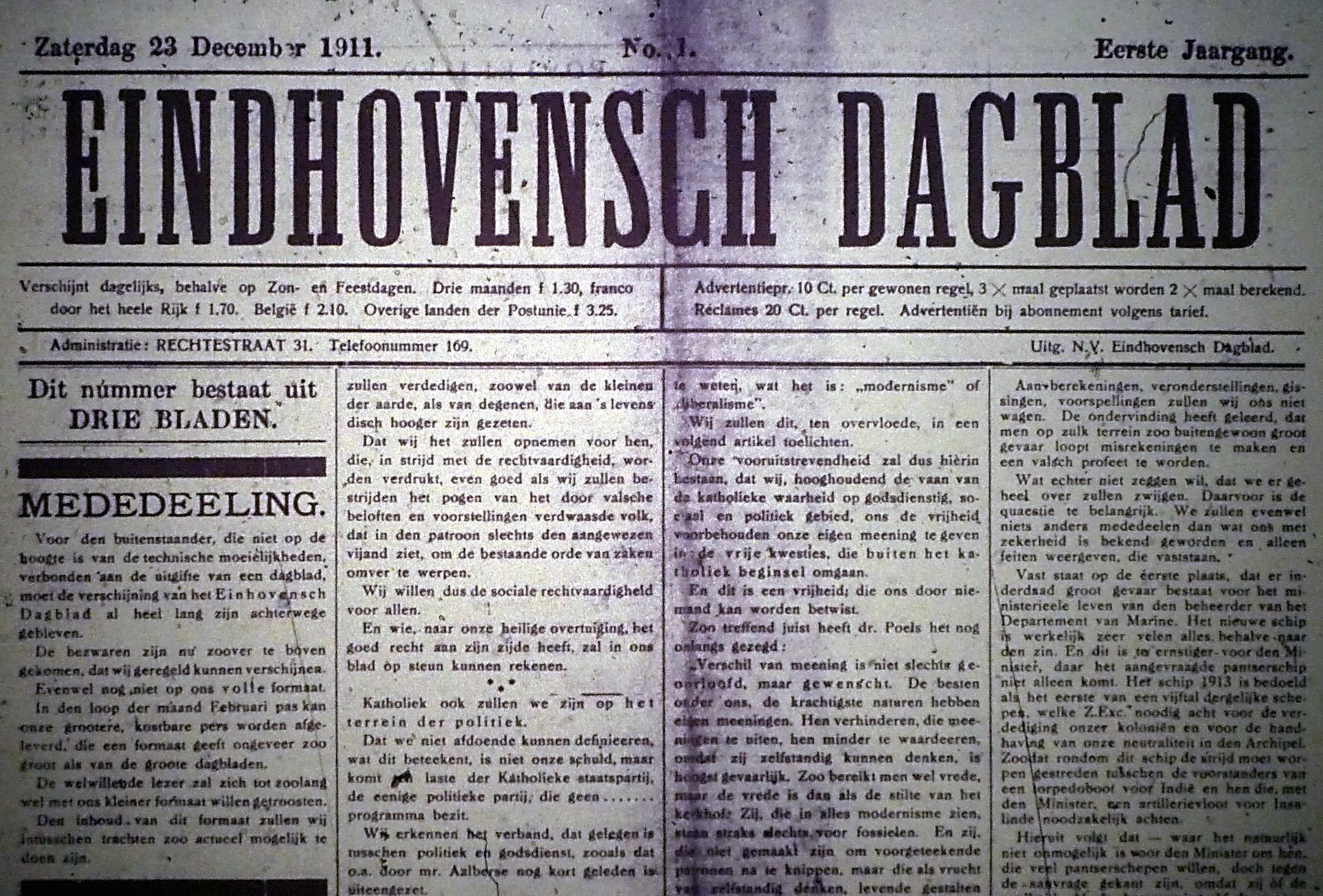
- First issue, 23 December 1911
- Type: Daily newspaper
- Owner: DPG Media
- Editor: John van den Oetelaar
- Founded: 1911
- Language: Dutch
- Headquarters: Eindhoven
- Circulation: about 80,000
- Website: Ed.nl

Eindhovens Dagblad is a daily Dutch newspaper based in the city of Eindhoven. In 2017 it had a circulation of about 80,000.

== History ==
Eindhovensch Dagblad first appeared on 23 December 1911.

In 1963 it was bought by the owner of its competitor Oost-Brabant. The two papers merged and continued under the Eindhovensch Dagblad name. A year later the Nieuwe Eindhovense Krant also merged into this newspaper which had a minor change in its name due to a change in Dutch spelling: Eindhovens Dagblad. In 1967 it was bought by Verenigde Nederlandse Uitgeversbedrijven (VNU), which also acquired the Helmonds Dagblad.

In 1993 Helmonds Dagblad ceased publication and Eindhovens Dagblad expanded coverage in Helmond. In 1994 Eindhovens Dagblad was the first Dutch newspaper with an internet publication. In 2000 VNU sold its publishing group to Wegener. In 2015 owner Wegener dissolved into the De Persgroep.
