= Leidsch Dagblad =

Dutch newspaper

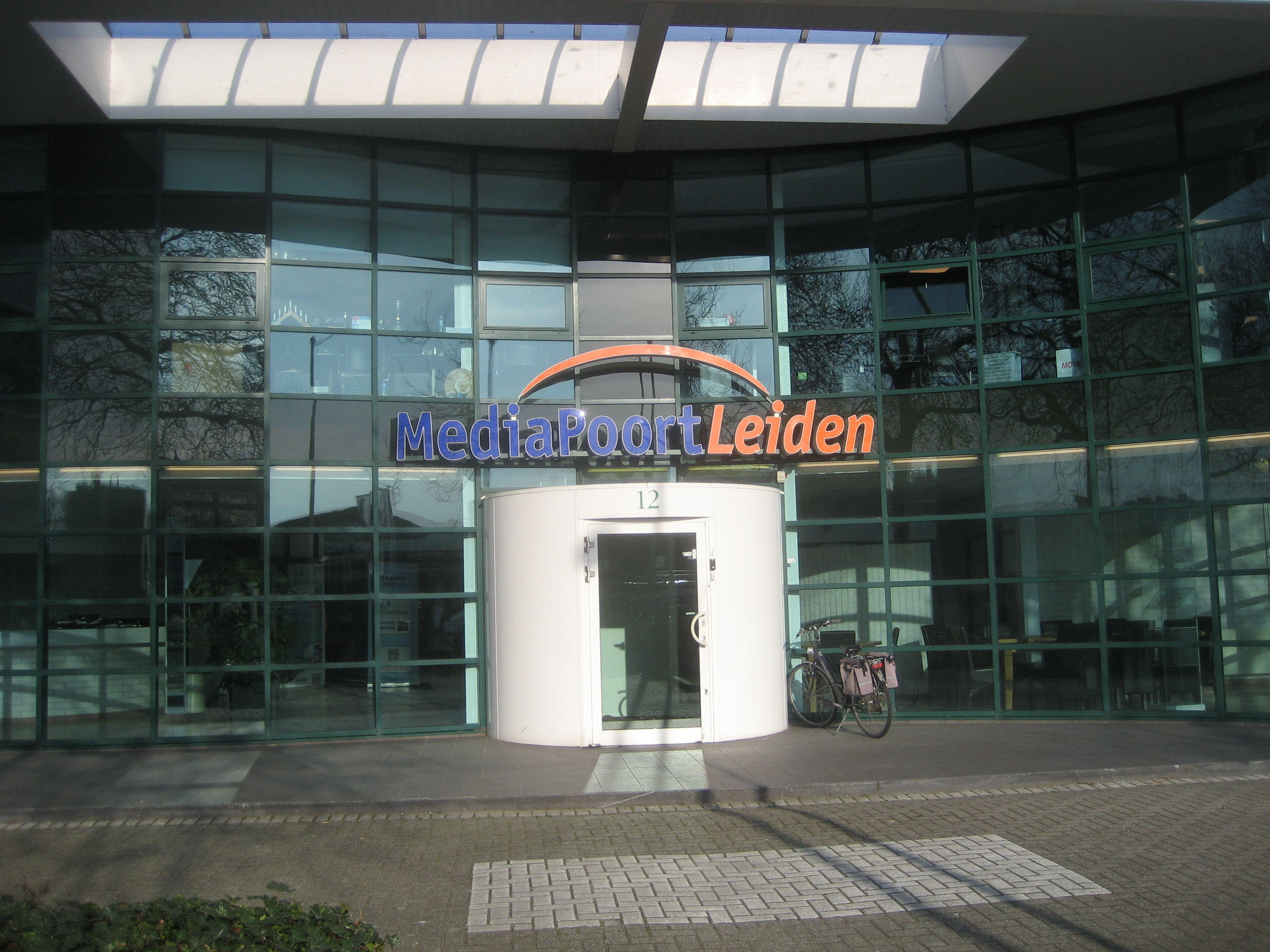
Offices of the Leidsch Dagblad in 2016.

The Leidsch Dagblad (Dutch: Leiden Daily) is a Dutch regional newspaper that is published since 1 March 1860. It is owned by Mediahuis Nederland and receives most editorial services from the Noordhollands Dagblad.

== History ==
Leidsch Dagblad was founded by publisher A.W. Sijthoff in 1860. The subscriber count grew from 180 in 1860 to 5,284 in 1890. The newspaper has been published almost daily since 1860, with the exception of 1944-1946 during German occupation.

In 2025, Leidsch Dagblad published their 50,000th issue.

Distribution has dwindled in the 2000s. In 2008, 31,439 copied were distributed in Leiden and suburbs. In 2017 distribution had fallen to 21,318 copies.
