= De Stentor =

Dutch newspaper

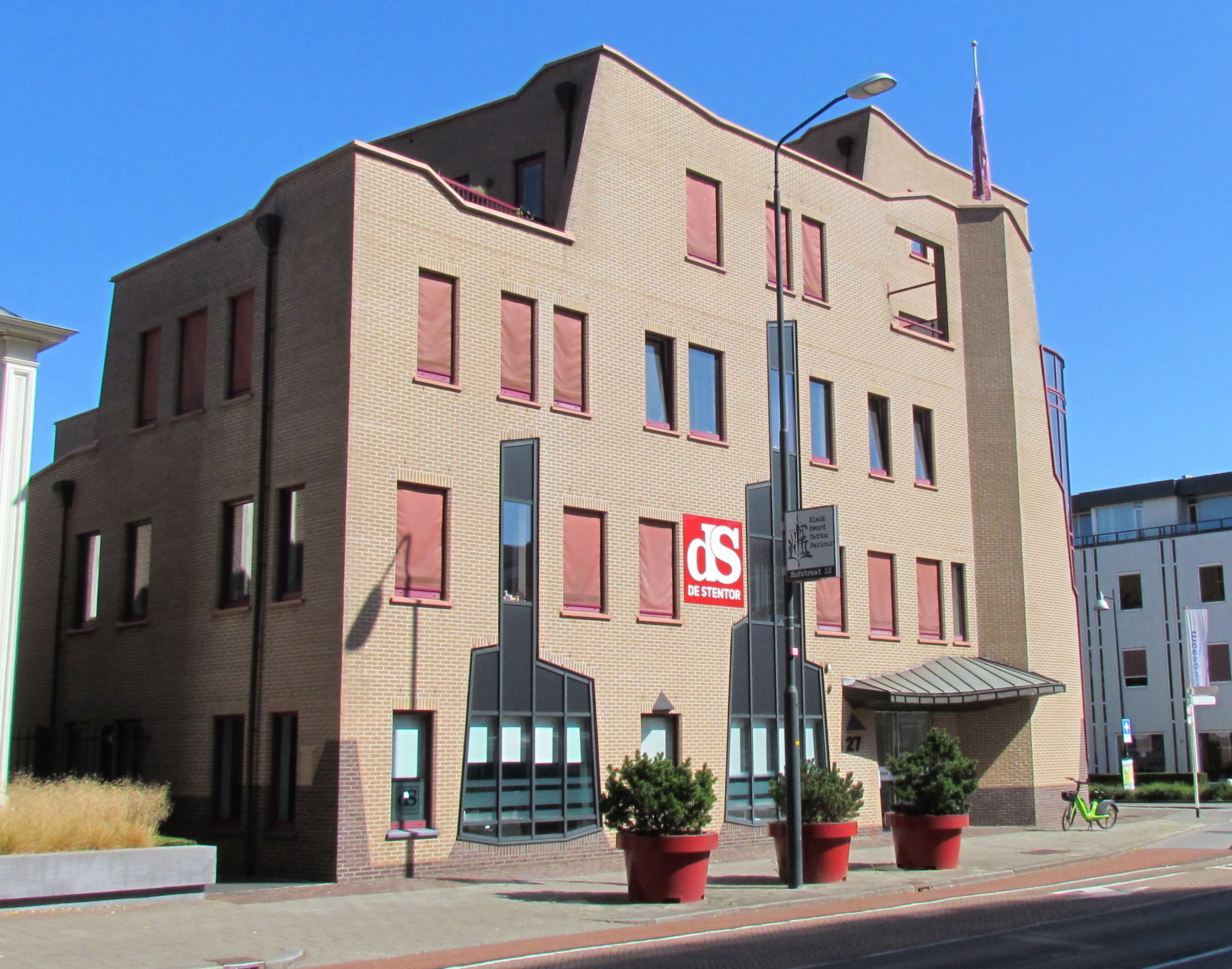
Picture of a De Stentor building

De Stentor is a Zwolle-based Dutch regional newspaper, appearing in several editions, in the Eastern part of the Netherlands. It is owned by DPG Media (formerly De Persgroep).

The Stentor has 10 regional editions:

- West-Veluwe
- Deventer
- Salland
- Zutphen & Achterhoek
- Zwolle
- Vechtdal
- Kampen-Flevoland
- Veluwe
- Kop van Overijssel

== Distribution ==
Annual paid distribution was:

- 2003: 158,987
- 2010: 121,551
- 2011: 116,043 (-4.5%)
- 2012: 111,596 (-3.8%)
- 2013: 104,687 (-6.2%)
- 2014: 99,375 (-5.1%)
- 2015: 93,065 (-6.3%)
- 2016: 90,313 (-3.0%)
- 2017: 87,510 (-3.1%)
