= Brabants Dagblad =

Dutch newspaper

- Type: Daily newspaper
- Format: 43 cm x 28 cm (since 2007)
- Editor: Annemieke Besseling
- Founded: 1771 or 1959
- Headquarters: 's-Hertogenbosch, Netherlands
- Circulation: 141,000 (2007)
- Website: bd.nl

Brabants Dagblad is a Dutch daily newspaper. It is distributed in the center and northeast of North Brabant, in 's-Hertogenbosch and Tilburg and their surrounding regions. The paper's office is in 's-Hertogenbosch.

== History ==
History of the Brabants Dagblad

=== 18th century ===
The history of Brabants Dagblad begins on 2 July 1771, when two printers in 's-Hertogenbosch, L.J. Bresser and C.A. Viéweg, started the 's-Hertogenbossche Dingsdagse (en Vrydagse) Courant, a city paper published on Tuesdays and Fridays.

=== 19th century ===
The paper underwent a number of name changes and was banned in 1810 under the French domination. After more name changes, the paper, now called Provinciaal Dagblad and loyal to the monarchy, found itself in competition with two other local papers: the newly founded Roman Catholic De Noord-Brabander, the likewise Catholic Nieuwe Noord-Brabanter (until 1872), and after 1869 with yet another city paper, Het Huisgezin.

=== 20th century ===
By 1910, De Noord-Brabander, Het Huisgezin, and the Noord-Brabanter - Noordbrabantsch Dagblad (1895) had merged, and in 1941, forced by the German occupiers, this paper merged with what was now called De Provinciale and became the Noordbrabantsche Courant. This paper was halted after Dolle Dinsdag (5 September 1944), and restarted after the war was over. In 1946, the paper received the name Provinciaal Noordbrabantsche Courant - Het Huisgezin. On 3 January 1959, the paper received its current name, and from a paper focused on the city of 's-Hertogenbosch it changed to a more regional paper.

In 1991, the Brabants Dagblad (then owned by VNU, the present The Nielsen Company) took over the competing paper in Tilburg, the Nieuwsblad. Theo Temmink became chief editor in 1994 but gave up his position in 1995; he had refused to move away from his hometown, Amsterdam, a decision which the board of directors could not condone.

=== 21st century ===
The chief editor since January 2006 is Annemieke Besseling, who had worked for the paper since 1989 as a regional editor, and was an editor at the main office since 2001. When she was appointed as chief editor, she became the first woman to run a Dutch newspaper. In 2007, the newspaper's format was switched to tabloid, along with all other Wegener papers, a decision announced in 2005 already; in that year, the Brabants Dagblad reported a 3% increase in circulation. The change in format was intended to allow for greater commensurability between Wegener's newspapers as a cost-cutting measure, given the decline in advertising revenues and the falling numbers of newspaper circulations throughout the Dutch market. In 2006 Wegener announced the loss of 300 jobs.

Soon after Mecom's take-over of Wegener, it became clear that financially not all was well with the new parent company, which was looking for dominance in the European media market. In 2008, Besseling was one of seven editors of regional papers to sign a letter to Mecom's David Montgomery complaining about a lack of resources devoted to those papers by the parent company. Proposed cost-cutting measures led to protests and threats of strikes. In February 2009, Mecom's financial position was acknowledged to be weak (its stock had fallen 97%), and there were fears that the Brabants Nieuwsblad and the eight other Dutch papers owned by the group would cease to exist.
