= Provinciale Zeeuwse Courant =

Netherlands newspaper

- Type: Daily newspaper
- Format: Compact
- Owner: DPG Media
- Editor-in-chief: Peter Jansen
- Associate editor: Arie Leen Kroon
- Headquarters: PZEM-centrale; Edisonweg 37E; 4380KA Vlissingen
- Circulation: 54.513 (2007)
- Website: pzc.nl

The Provinciale Zeeuwse Courant is a newspaper for the province of Zeeland, Netherlands, published and owned by DPG Media of Belgium. Founded in 1758, it is the third-oldest newspaper in the Netherlands.

== History ==
=== 19th century: Middelburgsche Courant ===
The paper is a merger of a number of regional papers, the oldest of which was the Middelburgsche Courant, founded in 1758 in Middelburg. One of its scoops was hiring the first female reporter in the Netherlands in 1885.

=== 20th century: Forming the Provinciale Zeeuwsche Courant ===
In 1933, the Middelburgsche Courant merged with a paper from Goes, the Goesche Courant. In 1939, it merged with the Vlissingsche Courant, founded in 1869 in Vlissingen, and became the Provinciale Zeeuwsche Courant.

In 1946, another Goes newspaper, Vrije Stemmen: Dagblad voor Zeeland, merged into the Provinciale Zeeuwse Courant. Vrije Stemmen started as an underground newspaper during WWII. In 1973, the proper name PZC was adopted, an abbreviation of Provinciale Zeeuwse Courant in colloquial language. In 1998, PZC took over the subscriber base of the Zierikzeesche Nieuwsbode, founded in 1844 by Pieter de Looze of Zierikzee.

=== 21st century: Decreasing readership ===
In 2006, PZC's circulation was 58,000, down 3% from the year before, following a trend among Dutch regional newspapers. In 2007 and 2008 hovered around 52,000. Visitors to the paper's website brought the total readership up to 250,000 in 2008.

In 2008, PZC celebrated its 250th anniversary in the presence of Beatrix of the Netherlands, who received a copy of the commemorative book PZC 250 Jaar.

In 2010, Wegener was fined 20 million Euros by the Dutch competition regulator, the Nederlandse Mededingingsautoriteit. Wegener also owned BN/De Stem, a regional newspaper in West North Brabant that published a Zeeland edition. BN/De Stem had been acquired by Wegener in 2000 when it took over VNU, and it had been required to keep both papers editorially separate to continue to offer readers a choice between two independent newspapers. In 2009, complaints arose that Wegener had merged operations to reduce costs, which led to the 2010 verdict.

In 2010, 48% of the paper's paid subscribers shared the paper with their neighbors, the highest such number among Dutch newspapers. In 2012, circulation was down to 49,948 copies. In 2015, Wegener was sold to the De Persgroep of Belgium, now known as DPG Media.
