= Dag =

Dag(s) may refer to:

== Arts and entertainment ==
=== Film and television ===
- DAG (American TV series), 2000–2001
- Dag (Norwegian TV series), 2010–2015
- Dags (film), a 1998 Australian comedy film
- The Mountain (2012 film) (Turkish: 'Dağ'), a 2012 Turkish drama film

=== Music ===
- DAG (band), an American funk band
- DAG (Yugoslav band), a rock band
- The Dags, nickname for Australian band The Stray Dags
- Demented Are Go, a Welsh band
- "DAG", a 2020 song by Angelo Iannelli

=== Other uses in arts and entertainment ===
- DAG (Delhi Art Gallery), an art house based in India
- DAG (newspaper), a former free Dutch newspaper

== People ==
- Dag (name), including a list of people and fictional characters with the name
- Dag the Wise, a 4th-century Swedish king

== Places ==
- Dág, Hungary
- Dąg, Poland
- Dag (lunar crater), on the Moon
- Dag, a crater on Callisto, a moon of Jupiter
- Dar al Gani, or DaG, a meteorite field in the Libyan Sahara

== Science and technology ==
- Diacylglycerol or diglyceride, commonly used as food additives
- Directed acyclic graph, in computer science and mathematics
- Decagram, or 10 grams, an SI multiple of gram
- Database Availability Group, a feature of Microsoft Exchange Server

== Transportation ==
- Dalgety Bay railway station, Scotland, station code DAG
- Barstow-Daggett Airport, California, U.S., IATA code DAG

== Abbreviations for scholarly works ==
- DAG or DAGR, Dictionnaire des antiquités grecques et romaines
- DAG, The Dialects of Ancient Gaul by Joshua Whatmough

== Other uses ==
- Dag (slang), an Australian affectionate insult
- DAG Ventures, an American venture capital firm
- DAG Rīga, later FK VEF Rīga, a Latvian football club
- Dagbani language, ISO 639-3 language code dag
- Democratic Army of Greece, during the Greek Civil War 1946–1949
- Deputy Attorney General, a post in a national department of justice
- Defense Acquisition Guide, a guidebook for military acquisition in the U.S.
- Dyck Advisory Group, a South African private military company
- German Salaried Employees' Union (Deutsche Angestellten-Gewerkschaft)

== See also ==
- Daag (disambiguation)
- Dagr, the personification of day in Norse mythology
- Aquadag, a water-based colloidal graphite coating
