= DAG (newspaper) =

Dutch tabloid newspaper

Dag
- Type: Free newspaper
- Format: Tabloid
- Publisher: PCM and KPN
- Editor-in-chief: Bob Witman
- Founded: 8 May 2007
- Ceased publication: 1 October 2008
- Language: Dutch
- Country: Netherlands
- Circulation: 400,000 (as of September 2007)
- Website: www.dag.nl (defunct)

Dag (Dutch pronunciation: [dɑx]; English: Day), stylized as DAG, was a Dutch-language tabloid newspaper in the Netherlands that was freely distributed between 2007 and 2008. It was released jointly by publishing company PCM and telecommunications company KPN. Bob Witman was the editor-in-chief.

The first edition of Dag was published on 8 May 2007 with a circulation of 300,000 copies, accompanied with the launch of the website. It competed with long-time free newspapers Metro and Spits, as well as De Pers which had started on 23 January of that year. The paper and the website were noted for its clear layout, its extensive use of images, and much attention for reactions of the general public. It was reported that in the one and a half year that followed, a maximum of 20 million euro would be invested. In September 2007, the circulation was raised to 400,000, and a Saturday magazine edition and an experimental delivery service were launched.

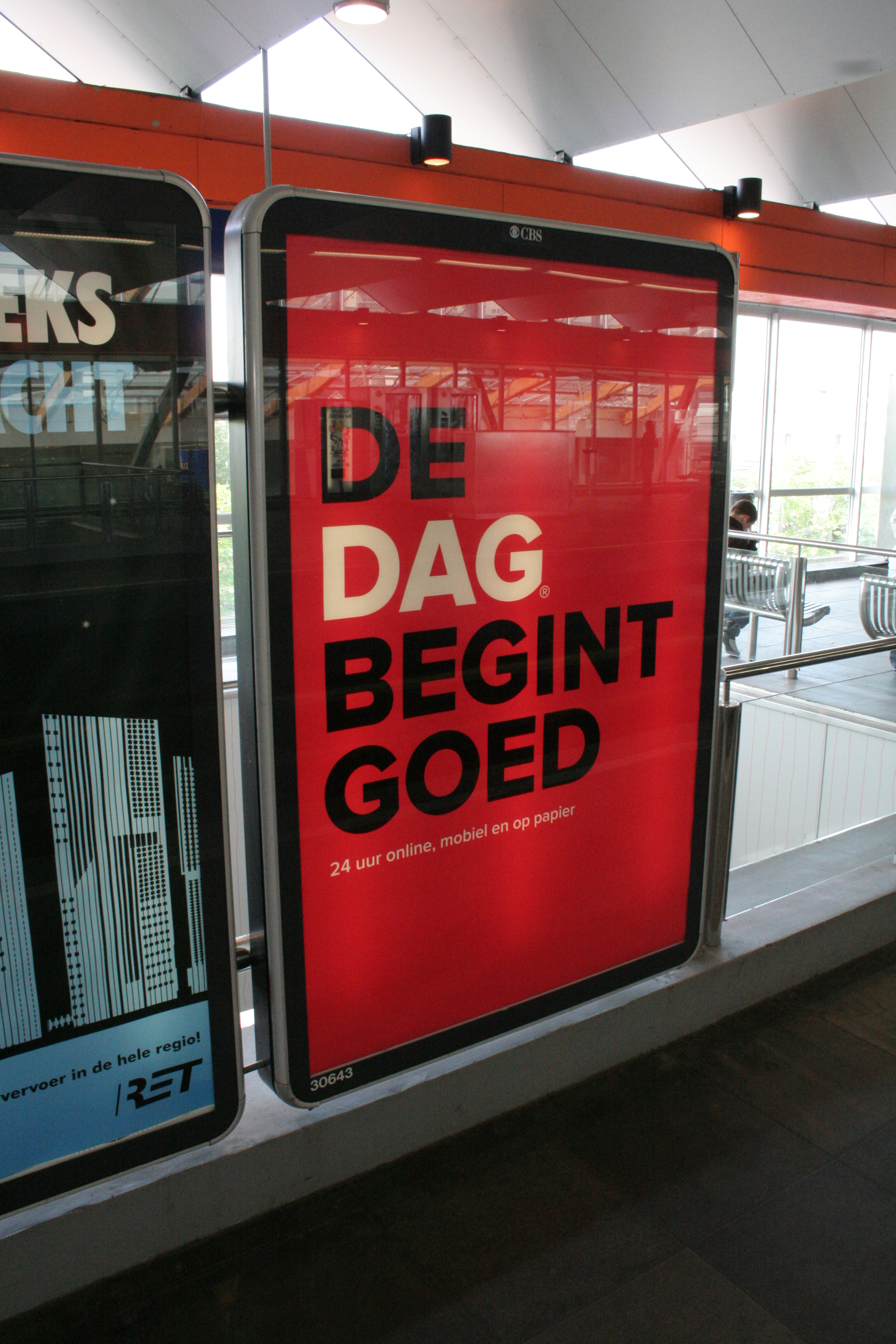
Advertisement for Dag in May 2007

On 29 September 2008, PCM and KPN announced that the newspaper would cease to exist. The reason was that the direction of Dag had failed to bind enough advertisers, mainly because of the fierce competition of the other free newspapers. The 2008 financial crisis also made it more likely that companies would save money on advertisement and sponsoring. The last issue was released on 1 October 2008, but the digital activities of Dag (online, mobile, and narrowcasting) were continued by PCM without support of KPN.
