= News.nl =

- Type: Daily newspaper
- Format: Tabloid
- Owner: De Telegraaf
- Editor: Frank Volmer
- Founded: Late 2000
- Ceased publication: 4 April 2001
- Language: Dutch
- Price: Free
- Website: news.nl at the Wayback Machine (archived 2000-10-13)

News.nl was a free Dutch tabloid-sized newspaper which was launched at the end of 2000 by De Telegraaf. The responsible editor was Frank Volmer

As opposed to Metro and Sp!ts (also released by De Telegraaf) it was an evening paper aimed at a more adult public than Sp!ts.

Next to the articles there was a code which could be entered on the website of News.nl, where one could find links with more information about the article.

On 4 April 2001 News.nl was terminated.
