= Angelo Iannelli =

Angelo Iannelli may refer to:

- Angelo Iannelli (runner)
- Angelo Iannelli (singer-songwriter)
