= Dag Hammarskjöld (disambiguation) =

Dag Hammarskjöld (1905–1961) served as the 2nd Secretary-General of the United Nations from 1953 to 1961.

Dag Hammarskjöld may also refer to:

- Dag Hammarskjöld Foundation, a Swedish non-profit foundation
- Dag Hammarskjöld Library, a library at the headquarters of the United Nations
- Dag Hammarskjöld Medal, a posthumous award given by the United Nations
- Dag Hammarskjöld Plaza, a public park in Manhattan, New York
- Dag Hammarskjöld invert, an American postage stamp with a design error
- Dag Hammarskjöld Crash Site Memorial, a memorial in Copperbelt Province, Zambia
- Dag Hammarskjöld Stadium, a stadium in Ndola, Zambia
- Dag Hammarskjöld (constituency), a National Assembly constituency in Zambia
- Dag Hammarskjöld Middle School, a school in Wallingford, Connecticut

== See also ==
- Dag (disambiguation)
- Hammarskjöld
