= NRC Next =

Dutch newspaper

- Type: Daily newspaper
- Format: Tabloid
- Owner: Mediahuis
- Founded: 14 March 2006
- Ceased publication: 2021
- Political alignment: None
- Language: Dutch
- Headquarters: Rokin 65; Amsterdam, Netherlands
- Circulation: 56,000
- Website: www.hoi-online.nl

NRC Next (Dutch pronunciation: [ˌɛnɛrseːˈnɛkst]; stylized as nrc•next) was a Dutch daily newspaper published in the Netherlands by Mediahuis. The first edition was released on 14 March 2006. It was stopped in March 2021. NRC Next was a morning edition tabloid, and its primary target group are young higher educated people.

== Formula ==
The newspaper aimed at young, well-educated (HBO or university) readers in the 25-34 age group, most of whom did not read a newspaper, or read the free tabloids Metro and Spits. Secondarily, NRC Next aimed at the 20-39 age group.

The newspaper was intended for "the new generation of interested media-users who use news and information in a different way", according to NRC executive editor Folkert Jensma. The news was delivered in concise format, because it was assumed that the readers had already picked up the basics from other sources. For the same reason, some news items was not covered at all. Background, analysis and opinion were thus the main focus of the paper.

== Relations with parent paper ==
NRC Next cooperated closely with the evening newspaper NRC Handelsblad and had its own independent editors. About 60% of the content of NRC Next was taken from the NRC. The paper used a team of thirty people to reformulate its contents to a format more suitable for a younger audience. Furthermore the NRC Next was supplemented with graphics, columns, comics and puzzles.

== Publishing ==
The paper was originally only published on Monday to Friday. It was marketed as a competitor for freesheets or, as the publishers claimed at the launch, it is "a newspaper for people who don't read paid newspapers." Its cost was one euro and ten cents, less than other paid newspapers. Regular readers could take a weekday subscription, or they could opt for a subscription for of NRC Next on weekdays and the NRC Weekend (Saturday edition for NRC Handelsblad and NRC Next) Saturday. After 12 October 2013 the paper was also published on Saturday. Subscribers could choose between NRC Weekend or the Saturday edition of NRC Next. Since 2021 both editions are branded NRC Handelsblad, with the evening edition disappearing.

== Belgian parallel ==
A comparable initiative was launched in Flanders, Belgium: De Standaard Espresso: a lighter version of the newspaper of record De Standaard. After disappointing sales it was quickly withdrawn from circulation after just seven months.
