= Iannelli =

Iannelli is an Italian surname. Notable people with the surname include:

- Alfonso Iannelli (1888–1965), Italian-American sculptor, artist, and industrial designer
- Angelo Iannelli (runner) (born 1976), Italian steeplechase runner
- Angelo Iannelli (singer-songwriter)
- Cristina Iannelli, Italian educationalist and academic
