= Ebru Umar =

Dutch columnist of Turkish descent (born 1970)

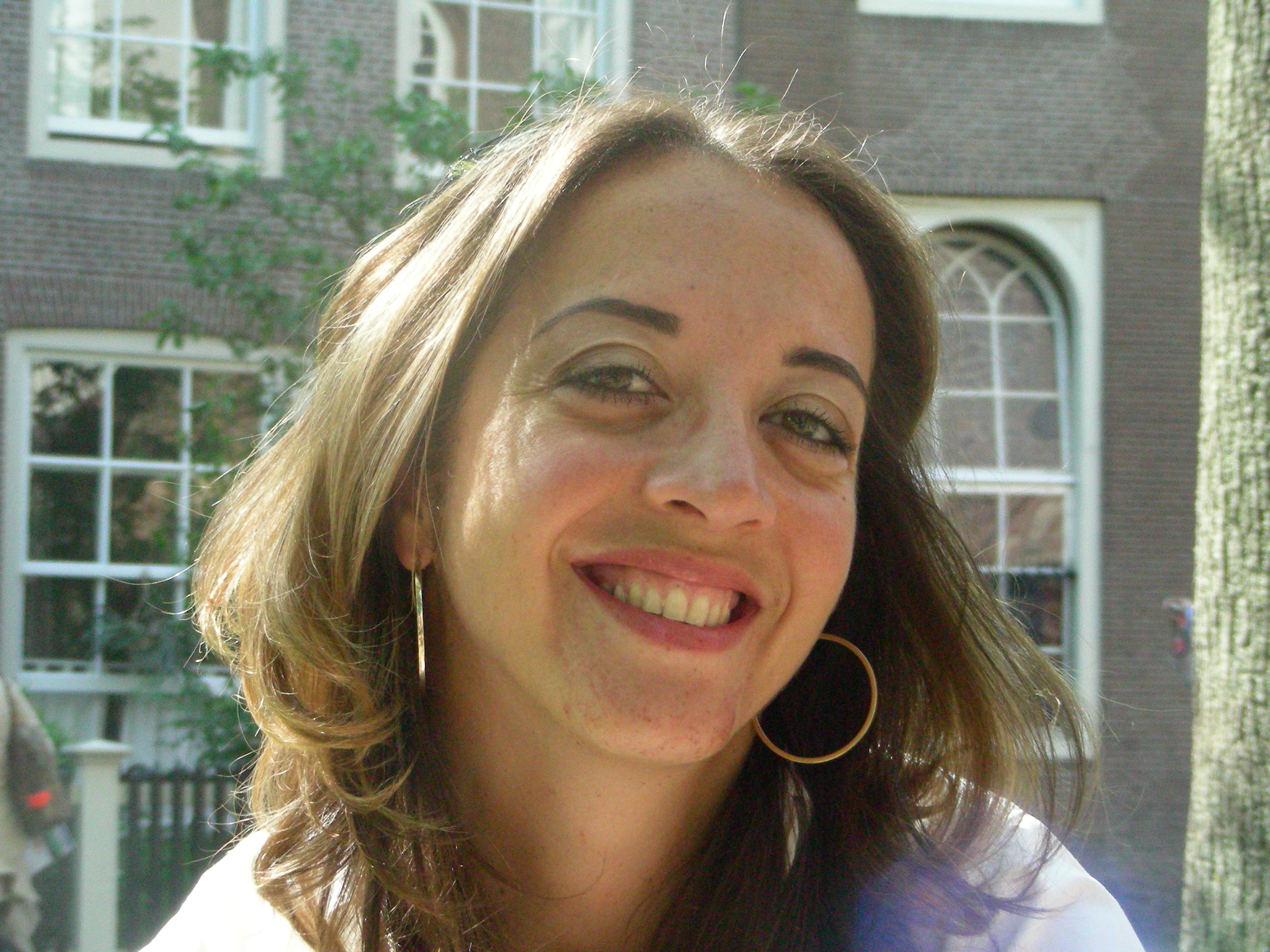
Umar in 2007

Ebru Umar (Dutch: [ˈeːbru ˈumɑr], Turkish: [ˈebɾu uˈmaɾ]; born 20 May 1970) is a Dutch columnist of Turkish descent. Under the influence of Theo van Gogh, she gave up a career in management and became a columnist, first for van Gogh's website and, after he was assassinated, as his successor as a regular columnist of Metro. She writes for a number of Dutch magazines and has published four books, often on the topics of feminism and criticism of Islam.

== Biography ==
Umar is the child of Turkish parents who came to the Netherlands in 1970. Her father is a retired anatomic pathologist, her mother an ophthalmologist. She grew up in Rotterdam and attended the Gymnasium Erasmianum.

After studying management and working for a while as a manager, she began writing, under the influence of Theo van Gogh, and wrote columns for his website (van Gogh was her "friend and mentor"), and soon began writing for a number of other Dutch newspapers. In 2005 she took over van Gogh's column in Metro. Umar is also the author of four books, and writes a weekly column for the Dutch women's weekly magazine Libelle (in addition to doing interviews and panel discussions for the magazine) and for the Dutch feminist magazine Opzij. Umar, an atheist, has a reputation for outspokenness, a characteristic her parents say she has had from an early age.

In 2006 she was beaten outside her apartment in Amsterdam by two attackers.

== Arrest in Turkey ==
On April 23, 2016, Umar was arrested in her holiday apartment in the Turkish town of Kuşadası, which she has said was for posting tweets that were critical of Turkish president Erdoğan. She was then released but not allowed to leave Turkey. On April 24, 2016, her home in Amsterdam was burglarized and vandalized.

== Bibliography ==
- Burka & Blahniks (2004)
- Vier over 8 (2005)
- Geen talent voor de liefde (2005), diary-style reminiscences
- Turkse verleidingen (2008), a collection of travel stories set in Turkey
