= De Pers =

Dutch newspaper

Dagblad De Pers
- Type: Daily newspaper
- Format: Tabloid
- Owner: Marcel Boekhoorn
- Publisher: Cornelis van den Berg
- Editor-in-chief: Ben Rogmans
- Staff writers: 40
- Founded: 23 January 2007
- Ceased publication: 30 March 2012
- Language: Dutch
- Headquarters: Amsterdam, Netherlands
- Circulation: 200,000
- Price: Free
- Website: depers.nl

De Pers (literal translation: The Press) was a freely distributed Dutch language tabloid newspaper in the Netherlands, with a circulation of around 200,000. Its competitors were Metro and Sp!ts. The first edition of De Pers was published on 23 January 2007 and its last edition was published 30 March 2012.
