= Daag =

Daag may refer to:

== Entertainment ==
- Daag (1952 film), an Indian Hindi-language drama directed by Amiya Chakravarty
- Daag (1973 film), an Indian Hindi-language romantic drama directed by Yash Chopra
- Daag: The Fire, a 1999 Indian Hindi-language drama directed by Raj Kanwar
- Daag (2001 film), a 2001 Indian Assamese-language film directed by Munin Barua
- Daag (2022 film), a Bangladeshi social film directed by Sanjoy Somadder

== Other uses ==
- Daagh Dehlvi (1831–1905), Mughal poet
- Deputy Assistant Adjutant General, a British Army administrative officer
- Houari Boumedienne Airport in Algeria (ICAO airport code)

== See also ==
- Dag (disambiguation)
