= Pen painting =

Painting technique

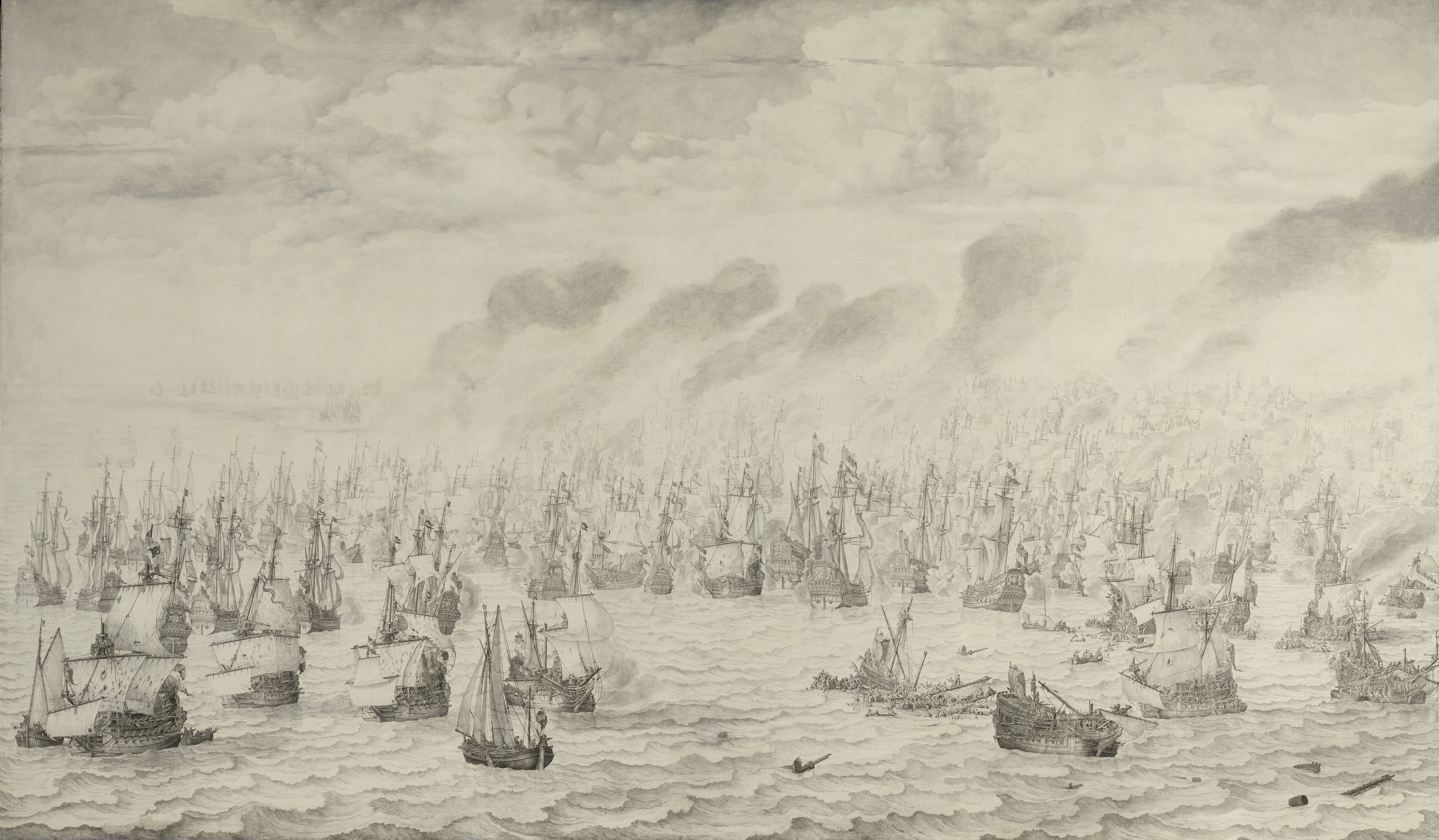
The Battle of Ter Heijde, a 1657 pen painting by Willem van de Velde the Elder

Pen painting is a painting technique used by seventeenth-century artists from the Dutch Republic. First the artist grounds a canvas with white oil paint before drawing on it with blue India ink. The invention of the technique is commonly attributed to Willem van de Velde the Elder.
