= Tabloid (newspaper format) =

Type of newspaper

Comparison of some newspaper sizes with metric paper sizes. Approximate nominal dimensions are in millimetres.

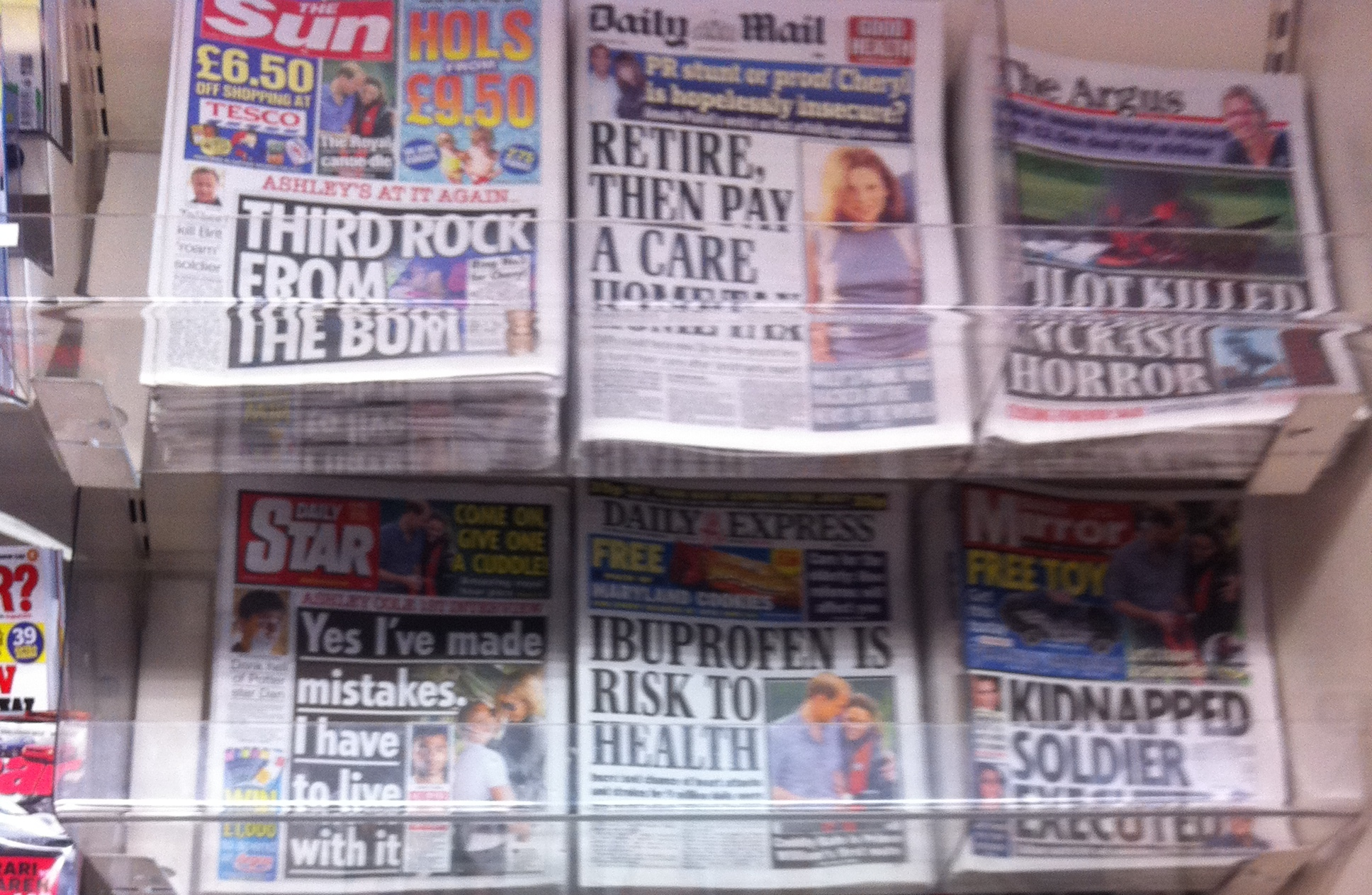
British tabloids in 2011

A tabloid is a newspaper format characterized by its compact size, smaller than a broadsheet. The term originates from the 19th century, when the London-based pharmaceutical company Burroughs Wellcome & Co. used the term to describe compressed pills, later adopted by newspapers to denote condensed content. There are two main types of tabloid newspaper: red tops and compact, distinguished by editorial style.

Red top tabloids are distinct from broadsheet newspapers, which traditionally cater to more affluent, educated audiences with in-depth reporting and analysis. However, the line between tabloids and broadsheets has blurred in recent decades, as many broadsheet newspapers have adopted tabloid or compact formats to reduce costs and attract readers.

Globally, the tabloid format has been adapted to suit regional preferences and media landscapes. In countries like Germany and Australia, tabloids such as Bild and The Daily Telegraph have significant readerships and political clout.

== Etymology ==
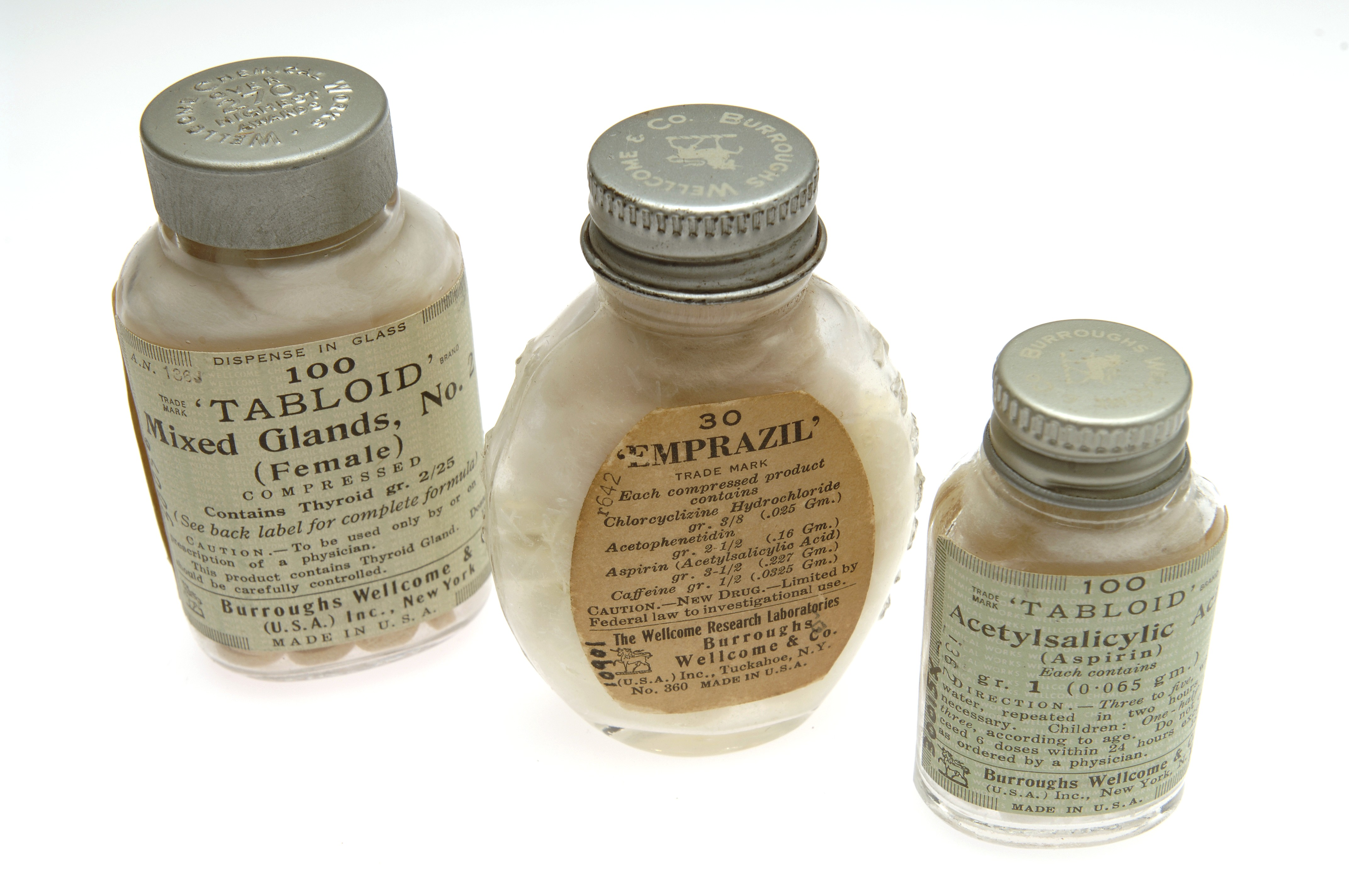
Tabloid products of the late 1880s

The word tabloid comes from the name given by the London-based pharmaceutical company Burroughs Wellcome & Co. to the compressed tablets they marketed as "Tabloid" pills in the late 1880s. The word tabloid was soon applied to other small compressed items. A 1902 item in London's Westminster Gazette noted, "The proprietor intends to give in tabloid form all the news printed by other journals." Thus, by 1901, tabloid journalism originally meant condensed stories in a simplified, easily absorbed format. Later, by 1918, tabloid was also being used to refer to smaller sheet newspapers that contained the condensed stories.

== Types ==
Tabloid newspapers, especially in the United Kingdom, vary widely in their target market, political alignment, editorial style, and circulation. Thus, various terms have been coined to describe the subtypes of this versatile paper format. There are, broadly, two main types of tabloid newspaper: red top and compact. The distinction is largely of editorial style; both red top and compact tabloids span the width of the political spectrum from socialism to capitalist conservatism, although red-top tabloids, on account of their historically working-class target market, generally embrace populism to some degree. Red top tabloids are so named due to their tendency, in British and Commonwealth usage, to have their mastheads printed in red ink; the term compact was coined to avoid the connotation of the word tabloid, which implies a red top tabloid, and has lent its name to tabloid journalism, which is journalism after the fashion of red top reporters.

=== Red top tabloids ===
Red top tabloids, named after their distinguishing red mastheads, employ a form of writing known as tabloid journalism; this style emphasizes features such as sensational crime stories, astrology, gossip columns about the personal lives of celebrities and sports stars, and junk food news. Celebrity gossip columns which appear in red top tabloids and focus on their sexual practices, misuse of narcotics, and the private aspects of their lives often border on, and sometimes cross the line of defamation.

Red tops tend to be written with a simplistic, straightforward vocabulary and grammar; their layout usually gives greater prominence to the picture than to the word. The writing style of red top tabloids is often accused of sensationalism and extreme political bias; red tops have been accused of deliberately igniting controversy and selectively reporting on attention-grabbing stories, or those with shock value. In the extreme case, tabloids have been accused of lying or misrepresenting the truth to increase circulation.

Examples of British red top newspapers include The Sun, the Daily Star and the Daily Mirror. Although not using red mastheads, the Daily Mail and Daily Express also use the 'tabloid journalism' model. Circulation of the printed newspapers has fallen, and although they have established websites it has been difficult to generate income from them.

=== Compact tabloids ===
In contrast to red-top tabloids, compacts use an editorial style more closely associated with broadsheet newspapers. In fact, most compact tabloids formerly used the broadsheet paper size, but changed to accommodate reading in tight spaces, such as on a crowded commuter bus or train. The term compact was coined in the 1970s by the Daily Mail, one of the earlier newspapers to make the change, although it now once again calls itself a tabloid. The purpose behind this was to avoid the association of the word tabloid with the flamboyant, salacious editorial style of the red top newspaper.

The early converts from broadsheet format made the change in the 1970s; two British papers that took this step at the time were the Daily Mail and the Daily Express. In 2003, The Independent also made the change for the same reasons, quickly followed by The Scotsman and The Times. On the other hand, The Morning Star had always used the tabloid size, but stands in contrast to both the red top papers and the former broadsheets; although The Morning Star emphasizes hard news, it embraces socialism and is circulated mostly among blue-collar labourers.

Compact tabloids, just like broadsheet- and Berliner-format newspapers, span the political spectrum from progressive to conservative and from capitalist to socialist.

== International use ==
=== Africa ===
In Morocco, Maroc Soir, launched in November 2005, is published in tabloid format.

In South Africa, the Bloemfontein-based daily newspaper Volksblad became the first serious broadsheet newspaper to switch to tabloid, but only on Saturdays. Despite the format being popular with its readers, the newspaper remains broadsheet on weekdays. This is also true of Pietermaritzburg's daily, The Witness in the province of KwaZulu-Natal. The Daily Sun, published by Naspers, has since become South Africa's biggest-selling daily newspaper and is aimed primarily at the black working class. It sells over 500,000 copies per day, reaching approximately 3,000,000 readers. Besides offering a sometimes satirical view of the seriousness of mainstream news, the Daily Sun also covers fringe theories and paranormal claims such as tikoloshes, ancestral visions and all things supernatural. It is also published as the Sunday Sun.

In Mauritius, the popular afternoon newspaper Le Mauricien shifted from tabloid (1908–2008) to the Berliner format (2008–2013) and now adopts a compact format with 32 pages during the week and 48 pages on Saturday.

=== Asia ===
In Bangladesh, the Daily Manab Zamin became the first and is now the largest circulated Bengali language tabloid in the world.

In Georgia, the weekly English-language newspaper The Financial switched to a compact format in 2005 and doubled the number of pages in each issue. Other Georgian-language newspapers have tested compact formats in the early 1990s.

Tabloid journalism is still an evolving concept in India's print media. The first tabloid, Blitz was started by Russi Karanjia on February 1, 1941, with the words "Our Blitz, India's Blitz against Hitler!". Blitz was first published in English and then branched out with Hindi, Marathi and Urdu versions. In 1974, Russi's daughter Rita founded the Cine Blitz magazine. In 2005, Times of India brought out a dedicated Mumbai tabloid newspaper, Mumbai Mirror, which gives prominence to Mumbai-related stories and issues. Tehelka started as a news portal in 2000. It broke the story about match-fixing in Indian and International Cricket and the sting operation on defence deals in the Indian Army. In 2007, it closed shop and reappeared in tabloid form, and has been appreciated for its brand of investigative journalism. Other popular tabloid newspapers in English media are Mid-Day, an afternoon newspaper published out of and dedicated to Mumbai and business newspapers like MINT. There are numerous tabloids in most of India's official languages. There is an all youth tabloid by the name of TILT – The ILIKE Times.

In Indonesia, tabloids include Bola, GO (Gema Olahraga, defunct), Soccer (defunct), Fantasy (defunct), Buletin Sinetron (defunct), Pro TV (defunct), Citra (defunct), Genie, Bintang Indonesia (Indonesian Stars), Nyata, Wanita Indonesia (Women of Indonesia), Cek and Ricek, and Nova.

In Oman, TheWeek is a free, 48-page, all-colour, independent weekly published from Muscat in the Sultanate of Oman. Oman's first free newspaper was launched in March 2003 and has now gone on to gather what is believed to be the largest readership for any publication in Oman. Ms Mohana Prabhakar is the managing editor of the publication. TheWeek is audited by BPA Worldwide, which has certified its circulation as being a weekly average of 50,300.

In Pakistan, Khabrain is a tabloid newspaper popular within the lower middle class. This news group introduced a new paper, Naya Akhbar which is comparably more sensational. At the local level, many sensational tabloids can be seen but, unlike Khabrain or other big national newspapers, they are distributed only on local levels in districts.

Tabloids in the Philippines are usually written in local languages, like Tagalog or Bisaya, one of the listed top Tagalog tabloids is Bulgar, but some are written in English, like the People's Journal and Tempo. Like their common journalistic connotations, Philippine tabloids usually report sensationalist crime stories and celebrity gossip, and some tabloids feature topless photos of girls. Several tabloids are vernacular counterparts of English broadsheet newspapers by the same publisher, like Pilipino Star Ngayon (The Philippine Star), Bandera (Philippine Daily Inquirer), and Balita (Manila Bulletin). In the Southern Philippines, a new weekly tabloid, The Mindanao Examiner, now includes media services, such as photography and video production, into its line as a source to finance the high cost of printing and other expenses. It is also into independent film making.

=== Europe ===
The Berliner format, used by many prominent European newspapers, is sized between the tabloid and the broadsheet. In a newspaper context, the term Berliner is generally used only to describe size, not to refer to other qualities of the publication. The biggest tabloid (and newspaper in general) in Europe, by circulation, is Germany's Bild, with around 2.5 million copies (down from above 5 million in the 1980s). Although its paper size is bigger, its style was copied from the British tabloids.

In Denmark, tabloids in the British sense are known as 'formiddagsblade' (before-noon newspapers), the two biggest being BT and Ekstra Bladet. The old more serious newspaper Berlingske Tidende shifted from broadsheet to tabloid format in 2006, while keeping the news profile intact.

In Finland, the biggest newspaper and biggest daily subscription newspaper in the Nordic countries Helsingin Sanomat changed its size from broadsheet to tabloid on 8 January 2013.

In France, the Nice Matin (or Le Dauphiné), a popular Southern France newspaper changed from Broadsheet to Tabloid on 8 April 2006. They changed the printing format in one day after test results showed that 74% liked the Tabloid format compared to Broadsheet. But the most famous tabloid dealing with crime stories is Le Nouveau Détective, created in the early 20th century. This weekly tabloid has a national circulation.

In the Netherlands, several newspapers have started publishing tabloid versions of their newspapers, including one of the major 'quality' newspapers, NRC Handelsblad, with nrc•next (ceased 2021) in 2006. Two free tabloid newspapers were also introduced in the early 2000s, 'Metro and Sp!ts (ceased 2014), mostly for distribution in public transportation. In 2007, a third and fourth free tabloid appeared, 'De Pers' (ceased 2012) and 'DAG' (ceased 2008). De Telegraaf, came in broadsheet but changed to tabloid in 2014.

In Norway, close to all newspapers have switched from the broadsheet to the tabloid format, which measures 280 x 400 mm. The three biggest newspapers are Dagbladet, VG, and Aftenposten.

In Poland, the newspaper Fakt, sometimes Super Express is considered as tabloid.

In the United Kingdom, three previously broadsheet daily newspapers—The Times, The Scotsman and The Guardian—have switched to tabloid size in recent years, and two—Daily Express and Daily Mail—in former years, although The Times and The Scotsman call the format "compact" to avoid the down-market connotation of the word tabloid. Similarly, when referring to the down-market tabloid newspapers the alternative term "red-top" (referring to their traditionally red-coloured mastheads) is increasingly used, to distinguish them from the up- and middle-market compact newspapers. The Morning Star also comes in tabloid format; however, it avoids celebrity stories, and instead favours issues relating to labour unions.

=== North America ===
==== Canada ====
In Canada many newspapers of Postmedia's Sun brand are in tabloid format and are considered to practice tabloid journalism, including the Toronto Sun, Calgary Sun, Edmonton Sun, and Ottawa Sun (the Winnipeg Sun is no longer owned by Postmedia). Postmedia's The Province, a newspaper for the British Columbia market, is a former broadsheet which now prints in tabloid-size but is not considered a tabloid in the journalistic sense. The Canadian publisher Black Press publishes newspapers in the provinces of British Columbia and Alberta in both tabloid (10 1/4 in (260 mm) wide by 14 1/2 in (368 mm) deep) and what it calls "tall tab" format, where the latter is 10 1/4 in (260 mm) wide by 16 1/4 in (413 mm) deep, larger than tabloid but smaller than the broadsheets it also publishes.

In Quebec, Le Journal de Montréal is a tabloid and has the largest circulation of any French-language newspaper in Canada. Le Journal de Québec is its sister paper in Quebec City. Both newspapers are owned by Quebecor.

==== United States ====
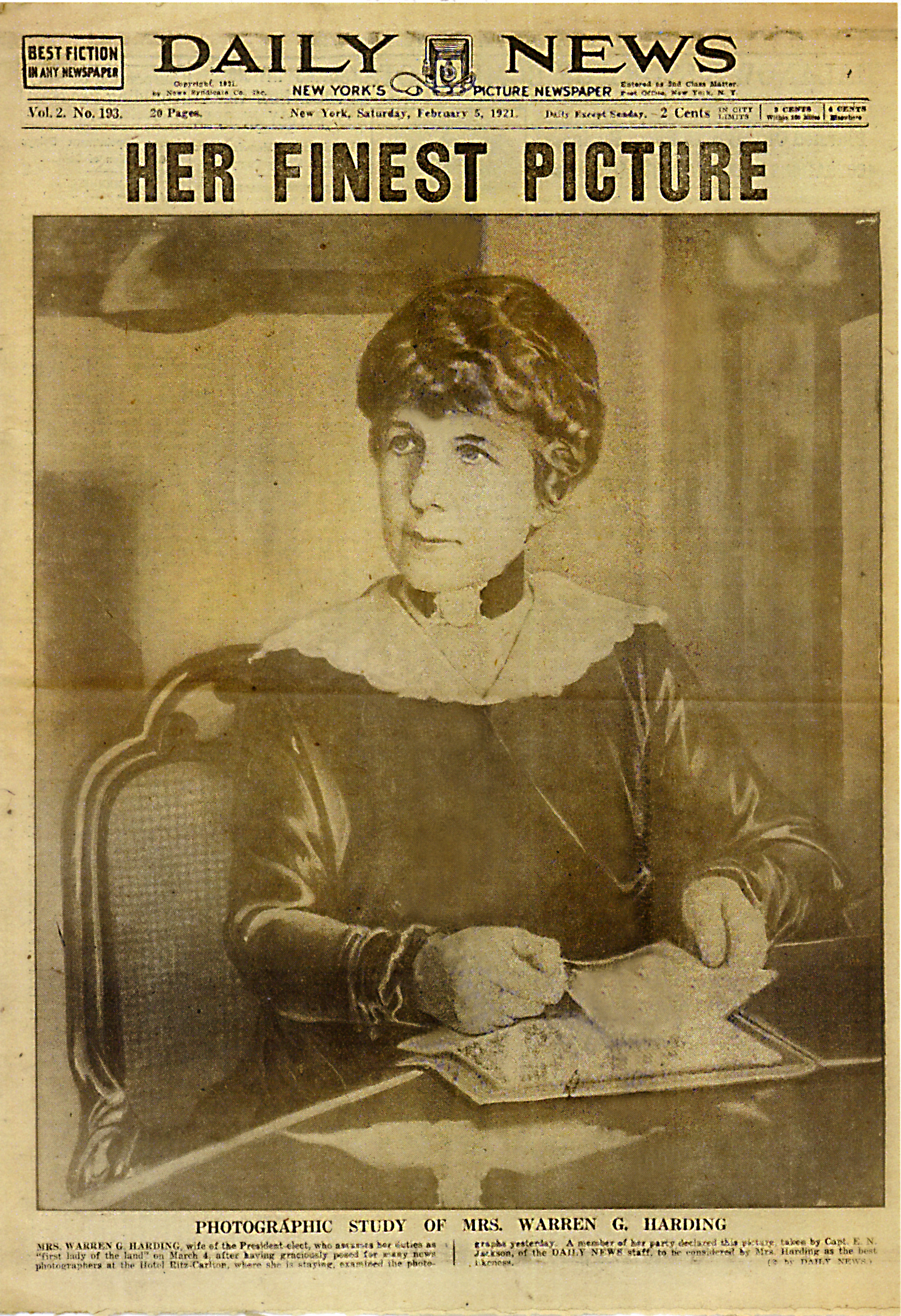
"A photographer's photographer" quote by First Lady Florence Harding, who stated the Edward Jackson's photograph of her was "the best photo ever taken." The photo ran on the entire front page of the February 5, 1921 edition of the New York Daily News.

In the United States, daily tabloids date back to the founding of the New York Daily News in 1919, followed by the New York Daily Mirror, and the New York Evening Graphic in the 1920s. Competition among those three for crime, sex and celebrity news was considered a scandal to the mainstream press of the day. The tabloid format is used by a number of respected and indeed prize-winning American papers. Prominent American tabloids include the New York Post, the Daily News and Newsday in New York, the San Francisco Examiner, The Bakersfield Californian and La Opinión in California, The Jersey Journal and The Trentonian in New Jersey, the Philadelphia Daily News, the Delaware County Daily Times and The Citizens' Voice, The Burlington Free Press, the Chicago Sun-Times, and the Boston Herald. American tabloids that ceased publication include Denver's Rocky Mountain News.

=== Oceania ===
In Australia, tabloids include The Advertiser, the Herald Sun, The Sun-Herald, The Daily Telegraph, The Courier Mail, The West Australian, The Mercury, the Hamilton Spectator, The Portland Observer, The Casterton News and The Melbourne Observer.

=== South America ===
In Argentina, one of the country's two main newspapers, Clarín, is a tabloid.

In Brazil, many newspapers are tabloids, including sports daily Lance! (which circulates in cities such as Rio de Janeiro and São Paulo), most publications currently and formerly owned by Grupo RBS (especially the Porto Alegre daily Zero Hora), and, in March 2009, Rio de Janeiro-based O Dia switched to tabloid from broadsheet, though, several years later, it reverted to being a broadsheet. Its sister publication, Meia Hora has always been a tabloid, but in slightly smaller format than O Dia and Lance!.

== As a weekly alternative newspaper ==
The more recent usage of the term 'tabloid' refers to weekly or semi-weekly newspapers in tabloid format. Many of these are essentially straightforward newspapers, publishing in tabloid format, because subway and bus commuters prefer to read smaller-size newspapers due to lack of space. These newspapers are distinguished from the major daily newspapers, in that they purport to offer an "alternative" viewpoint, either in the sense that the paper's editors are more locally oriented, or that the paper is editorially independent from major media conglomerates.

Other factors that distinguish "alternative" weekly tabloids from the major daily newspapers are their less-frequent publication, and that they are usually free to the user, since they rely on ad revenue. Alternative weekly tabloids may concentrate on local and neighbourhood-level issues, and on entertainment in bars, theatres, or other such venues.

Alternative tabloids can be positioned as upmarket (quality) newspapers, to appeal to the better-educated, higher-income sector of the market; as middle-market (popular); or as downmarket (sensational) newspapers, which emphasize sensational crime stories and celebrity gossip. In each case, the newspapers will draw their advertising revenue from different types of businesses or services. An upmarket weekly's advertisers are often organic grocers, boutiques, and theatre companies while a downmarket's may have those of trade schools, supermarkets, and the sex industry. Both usually contain ads from local bars, auto dealers, movie theaters, and a classified ads section.

== See also ==
- Paper size
