= Metro (Dutch newspaper) =

Dutch newspaper

- Owner: Mediahuis
- Founder(s): Falk Madeja, Bart Lubbers, Tiago Jurgens
- Ceased publication: April 2020 (print)
- Circulation: 463.000 (2012)
- Website: www.metronieuws.nl

Metro (Dutch pronunciation: [ˈmeːtroː]) is a free Dutch newspaper, distributed daily since 1999, mostly to commuters in high-traffic areas. Formerly owned by Metro International, in August 2012 the paper was taken over by the Telegraaf Media Group (TMG). At the time of acquisition, TMG already published another free Dutch newspaper, Spits. Later Spits merged into Metro.

== History ==
Metro follows the format of other free newspapers by Metro International, the first one of which appeared in Stockholm in 1995. The Dutch Metro was the fourth of those, and first appeared on 21 June 1999; it is published five days a week, and for a brief period had a Saturday edition as well. Separate editions for Rotterdam and Amsterdam appeared in October 2004 and April 2005. The business model is the same as that of the other Metro International publications: news is reported in a relatively brief fashion, all income is derived from advertisements, and the papers are distributed mainly in train stations, besides in supermarkets, shopping malls, universities, and parking garages. In 2004 it began distribution in post offices and McDonald's restaurants.

The first editor in chief was Jelle Leenes, who was succeeded in 2002 by Jan Dijkgraaf. From 2006 to 2008 the paper was led by Rutger Huizenga, and since 2008 by Robert van Brandwijk, former editor of the Algemeen Dagblad.

Until his death in 2004, Theo van Gogh wrote a daily column in Metro, which was regularly criticized for its commentary on, among others, Muslims (he famously referred to Muslims as "goat fuckers" in his Metro column) and Christians. His successor is Ebru Umar, a Dutch writer of Turkish descent.

The acquisition by TGM was prompted, according to Per Mikael Jensen, owner of Metro International, by a decrease in advertisement revenue. The paper's circulation had already been lowered by four percent to 463 thousand in the first quarter of 2012, and personnel cuts were expected following the takeover. TMG announced that it looked to save money by combining printing and distribution. According to TMG's Herman van Campenhout, that the two are owned by the same company will increase the difference between them. Metro is the country's second-largest newspaper; combined, the two papers have an estimated readership of 2.3 million, according to TMG.

=== Chief editors ===
- Robert van Brandwijk, 2008–2016

=== Circulation ===
- 1999: 270,000
- 2000: 300,000
- 2002: 309,000
- 2004: 299,000
- 2006: 465,000
- 2008: 533,000
- 2009: 530,000
- 2012: 463,000
- 2017: 267,158
