= Dag (name) =

Scandinavian masculine given name

- Pronunciation: Swedish: [ˈdɑːɡ]
- Gender: Male
- Language: Norwegian, Swedish

Origin
- Origin: Old Norse
- Meaning: Dagr (day)
- Region of origin: Scandinavia

Dag is a masculine Scandinavian given name derived from the Old Norse dagr, meaning "day", or the name of the god Dagr, a personification of the day. It is most commonly used in Norway and Sweden. In Sweden, September 16 is Dag's Name Day. Dag is uncommon as a surname. People with the name Dag include:

== Given name ==
- Dag Terje Andersen (born 1957), Norwegian politician
- Dag Arnesen (born 1950), Norwegian jazz musician
- Dag Arvas (1913–2004), Swedish Navy rear admiral
- Dag Berggrav (1925–2003), Norwegian jurist, civil servant and sports administrator
- Dag Bjørndalen (born 1970), Norwegian former biathlete
- Dag Fornæss (born 1948), Norwegian former speed skater
- Dag Frøland (1945–2010), Norwegian comedian, revue artist and singer
- Dag Gundersen (1928–2016), Norwegian linguist and lexicographer
- Dag Hammarskjöld (1905–1961), Swedish UN Secretary-General (1953–1961)
- Dag Hartelius (born 1955), Swedish diplomat
- Dag Herbjørnsrud (born 1971), Norwegian, former editor-in-chief of the Norwegian weekly news magazine Ny Tid
- Dag Heward-Mills (born 1963), Ghanaian Christian evangelist and author
- Dag Ingebrigtsen (born 1958), Norwegian musician
- Dag Juhlin (born 1962), American musician and podcaster
- Dag Larsson (born 1960), Swedish politician
- Dag Otto Lauritzen (born 1956), Norwegian cyclist
- Dag Alexander Olsen (born 1989), Norwegian footballer
- Dag Palovič (born 1975), Slovak TV presenter and poker player
- Dag Erik Pedersen (born 1959), Norwegian cyclist
- Dag Prawitz (born 1936), Swedish philosopher and logician
- Dag Ringsson (died), Norwegian, member of Olav Haraldsson's army at the battle of Stiklest
- Dag Schjelderup-Ebbe (1926–2013), Norwegian musicologist, composer, music critic and biographer
- Dag Solstad (born 1941), Norwegian author
- Dag Spantell (1950–2025), Norwegian singer
- Dag Volle (1963–1998) (Denniz Pop), Swedish pop music producer
- Dag C. Weberg (born 1937), Norwegian politician
- Dag Wennlund (born 1963), Swedish javelin thrower
- Dag Wirén (1905–1986), Swedish composer

== Nickname ==
- "Dags", Daryl Somers, an Australian television personality
- "DAG", David Alan Grier's nickname based on his initials

== Surname ==
- Burcu Dağ (born 1981), Turkish para-archer
- Ekrem Dağ (born 1980), Turkish football player
- Şevket Dağ (1876–1944), Turkish artist and politician

== Fictional characters ==
- Dag Redwing Hickory, male protagonist of Lois McMaster Bujold's series of novels "The Sharing Knife"
- Rick "Dag" Dagless, a character on the TV series Garth Marenghi's Darkplace
- Daggett Doofus Beaver, a cartoon character from Nickelodeon TV Series "The Angry Beavers"
- Dag Daughtry, a character in Jack London's novel Michael, Brother of Jerry
- The Dag, a character in the 2015 film Mad Max: Fury Road
- Dag, the main antagonist of Barnyard
- Dag, a side character from Assassin's Creed Valhalla
