= Aquadag =

Water-based graphite used in CRTs

Aquadag is a trade name for a water-based colloidal graphite coating commonly used in cathode ray tubes (CRTs). It is manufactured by Acheson Industries, a subsidiary of ICI. The name is a shortened form of "Aqueous Deflocculated Acheson Graphite", but has become a generic term for conductive graphite coatings used in vacuum tubes. Other related products include Oildag, Electrodag and Molydag. Deflocculation refers to the distribution of powdered high-purity graphite in an aqueous solution containing approximately 2% to 10% by weight of various Tannic/Gallotannic acid variants and separating the colloidal graphite suspension from the remaining unsuspended graphite particulates. The product names are often printed with DAG in upper case (e.g., AquaDAG). It is used as an electrically conductive coating on insulating surfaces, and as a lubricant.

== Properties ==
Aquadag consists of a dispersion of colloidal graphite in distilled water. It is provided in concentrated paste form and is usually diluted with distilled water to a desired consistency before application. It can be applied by brushing, swabbing, spraying, or dipping, after which the surface is dried, leaving a layer of pure graphite.

After drying, the coating is electrically conductive. Its resistance and other electrical properties vary with degree of dilution and application method. When diluted 1:1 and applied by brush its resistance is:

Air-dried ~800 ohms per square
Heated to 200 °C ~500 ohms per square
Heated to 300 °C ~20–30 ohms per square

== Use in cathode ray tubes ==
A conductive aquadag coating applied to the inside of the glass envelope of cathode ray tubes, serves as a high-voltage electrode. The coating covers the inside walls of the "bell" of the CRT tube, from just inside the neck, and stops just short of the screen. Due to the graphite, it is electrically conductive and forms part of the high-voltage positive electrode, the second anode, which accelerates the electron beam. The second anode is a metal cylinder inside the neck of the tube, connected to a high positive voltage of 18 to 25 kilovolts. It has spring clips, which press against the walls of the tube, making contact with the aquadag coating so it also carries this high positive voltage. The electron beam from the electron gun in the neck of the tube is accelerated by the high voltage on the anode and passes through it to strike the screen.

The aquadag coating has two functions: it maintains a uniform electric field inside the tube near the screen, so the electron beam remains collimated and is not distorted by external fields, and it collects the electrons after they have hit the screen, serving as the return path for the cathode current. When the electron beam hits the screen, in addition to causing the fluorescent phosphor coating to give off light, it also knocks other electrons out of the surface. These secondary electrons are attracted to the high positive voltage of the coating and return through it to the anode power supply. Without the coating a negative space charge would develop near the screen, deflecting the electron beam. A typical value of beam current collected by the anode coating is 0.6 mA.

In some CRTs the aquadag coating performs a third function, as a filter capacitor for the high-voltage anode supply. A second conductive coating is applied to part of the outside of the tube facing the inside coating. This outside coating is connected to the ground side of the anode supply, thus the full anode voltage is applied between the coatings. The sandwich of the two coatings separated by the dielectric glass wall of the tube form a final capacitor to filter out ripple from the anode supply. Although the capacitance is small, around 500 pF, due to the low anode current it is sufficient to act as a filter capacitor.

In the television tube manufacturing industry, the manufacturing step that applies the aquadag is called "dagging".

== Other uses ==
Aside from its use in the production of CRTs, Aquadag is used in many types of high-voltage laboratory apparatus where a conductive coating is needed on an insulating surface. The surfaces of some metals (most notably aluminum) can develop nonconductive oxide layers, which tend to disrupt the electrostatic field produced around the surface of the metal when used as an electrode. Aquadag is not subject to such effects and provides a completely uniform equipotential surface for electrostatics.

Producers of continuous filament fiberglass will coat their product with Aquadag when a conductive property is required.

Aquadag was also used in the production of some copper oxide rectifiers, to help make the ohmic connections to their counterelectrodes.

== Other dags ==
There are also deflocculated graphite products dispersed in liquids other than water. Acheson has extended the use of the dag brandname to non-graphite products, e.g., the copper-based Electrodag 437 conductive paint.
