= Angelo Iannelli (singer-songwriter) =

Italian writer, actor and singer-songwriter (born 1986)

- Born: 17 July 1986 (age 40); Benevento, Italy
- Genres: Pop; Folk rock; Rock; Indie pop
- Occupations: Singer-songwriter; writer; actor; playwright; film director
- Instruments: Vocals; guitar; piano
- Years active: 2016–present
- Labels: Hydra Music; Mafi; Paflaggero Dischi; Orangle Records; Matilde Dischi
- Website: www.angeloiannelli.it

Angelo Iannelli (born 17 July 1986 in Benevento, Italy) is an Italian singer-songwriter, writer, actor, playwright and filmmaker, known for blending auteur songwriting styles, folk-rock and indie-pop. His genre mixes singer-songwriter introspection with indie pop narrative and folk-rock structures, creating an original literary-minded musical style.

== Early life ==
Angelo Iannelli was born in Benevento, but due to his father's work, he spent his childhood and adolescence between Florence, Brindisi, Frosinone, Malta, and Rome, where he moved permanently in 2003 and began to frequent the Roman artistic scene, first in the world of acting, where he took part in his first theatrical performances, then in the literary and musical worlds. During this period, he began to write short stories and compose his first songs, influenced by the singer-songwriters of the 1970s, particularly Rino Gaetano, Antonello Venditti, Edoardo Bennato, Cat Stevens and, above all, Francesco De Gregori. After graduating from the Eugenio Montale classical high school in Rome in 2005, he enrolled in the DAMS degree course at the Faculty of Letters and Philosophy at the University of Roma Tre, where he graduated with a thesis in acting pedagogy, and subsequently continued his studies on cinema by enrolling in a master's degree course at the same faculty, where he developed a passion for the philosophy of art, the psychology of art and applied psychoanalysis, and graduated with a thesis in Aesthetics Philosophy.

During his university years, he studied acting with Carlo Merlo, a former professor at the Accademia Nazionale di Arte Drammatica Silvio D'Amico in Rome, and began teaching directing, playwriting, and screenwriting at the Clesis Arte school in Rome, directed by Merlo himself. During the same period, he wrote articles on literature, art, and culture for L'Eco del litorale and Roma Capitale Magazine, which were later republished by the magazine "PirandelloWeb", and wrote the screenplays for and directed several independent short films. He later specialized in literature and, once he obtained his teaching qualification, became a high school literature teacher.

== Literary career ==
After several theoretical-critical writings on philosophy, literature, music, acting pedagogy, and the interrelationships between art and psychoanalysis, in 2012 he wrote the text for the theatrical performance Dalla notte del mito all'Eneide, nei luoghi e nei tempi di Virgilio, which he performed with Michele Placido and Alessandro Haber. The following year he published the scientific essay L'Io diviso. Dai medici-filosofi alla letteratura, al teatro e al cinema del Novecento, which is included in the catalogues of international universities and libraries and is a bibliographical source on Luigi Pirandello, on the theme of the double, and on the contribution of experimental psychology to twentieth-century culture. In 2016, the novel Bar Binario was published, a coming-of-age story set in an imaginary nocturnal Rome. In 2023, his third book was published, the essay Il Metodo V.D.A.M. di Carlo Merlo. Una pedagogia attorica, based on the documentary he authored, Intervista a Carlo Merlo, il maestro delle Star – which explores and compares the most important contemporary acting methods, including the Stanislavski's system.

== Career as actor, screenwriter, and director ==
After studying acting and some theatrical experience, including the role of Creon in Euripides' Medea directed by Emanuele Faina and performed in various Roman theaters, since 2009 he has written, directed, and acted in several independent short films, the best known of which is Il nulla alle spalle.

Since 2011, he has begun acting in various TV series, including Squadra antimafia - Palermo oggi, R.I.S. Roma – Delitti imperfetti, Il peccato e la vergogna, L'onore e il rispetto, Un medico in famiglia, up to the most recent, Che Dio ci aiuti (2023), Il clandestino (2024) and Miss Fallaci (2025), and directed the music videos of his songs "Non lo so" and "DAG".

== Musical career ==
In May 2016, his first album, Il cannocchiale was released, which led him to begin a concert tour and perform with other artists, including Audio 2.

Between 2016 and 2017, the singles Paolo a Francesca were released, a reworking of Canto V of the Inferno from the Divine Comedy, in which Paolo, Dante's silent protagonist, speaks for the first time, and Conserva i sogni, both reviewed by various national newspapers such as La Repubblica and Il Giornale; after the single Milena, in 2019 the song Il bambino di Aleppo was released, inspired by a tragic news story and by Iannelli's long stays in Damascus, Syria, between 2008 and 2011: accompanied by an animated video clip, for its particular theme it received the attention of critics and several national newspapers and radio stations, such as TgCom24, Radio LatteMiele, Rai Radio 1 and Rai Isoradio, and entered the Mediaset Infinity catalogue.

Author of all his own songs, in recent years he has collaborated, among others, with the illustrator, animator and director Michele Bernardi (Colapesce, Vasco Brondi/Le luci della centrale elettrica, Tre Allegri Ragazzi Morti), who created the music video for Il bambino di Aleppo, with the producer Alessandro Canini (Antonello Venditti, Francesco De Gregori) and with the guitarist Riccardo Corso (Simone Cristicchi).

After the singles Comico dell'arte, GPB, Poema vocale, Malbene, Così scappi da te and Come a Hollywood (2023), the album Vicini margini was released on 24 May 2024, preceded by the single Elettronica.

== Musical style ==
Gifted with a warm and expressive voice, from a musical point of view he has embraced various sounds, from pop rock to indie pop, passing through folk and rock. In his lyrics there is an extensive use of metaphors, oxymorons and synesthesia, which often give rise to two parallel narrative levels, one simple and direct and the other not immediately interpretable; with an often poetic, melancholic romantic and intimate approach, as well as ironic on several occasions, he has treated interior and social themes with an original style, such as existential unease and the search for identity in contemporary society.

== Literary works ==
=== Novels ===
- Bar Binario, Roma: Aracne editrice, 2016, ISBN 978-88-548-9789-2 .

=== Nonfiction ===
- L'Io diviso. Dai medici-filosofi alla letteratura, al teatro e al cinema del Novecento, Roma: Aracne editrice, 2013, ISBN 978-88-548-6037-7.
- Il Metodo V.D.A.M. di Carlo Merlo. Una pedagogia attorica, Roma: StreetLib, 2023, ISBN 979-12-220-8895-2.

== Filmography ==
=== Actor ===
==== Television ====
- Sangue caldo (2011)
- Benvenuti a tavola – Nord vs Sud (2012)
- R.I.S. Roma - Delitti imperfetti (2012)
- Squadra antimafia - Palermo oggi (2013)
- Il peccato e la vergogna (2014)
- Un medico in famiglia (2014)
- L'onore e il rispetto (2015)
- Che Dio ci aiuti (2023)
- Un'estate fa (2023)
- Il clandestino (2024)
- Sempre al tuo fianco (2024)
- Miss Fallaci (2025)

==== Short films ====
- Il nulla alle spalle (2011)
- Volume n. 2 (2013)

=== Director and screenwriter ===
==== Short films ====
- Il nulla alle spalle (2011)
- Volume n. 2 (2013)

==== Documentaries ====
- Intervista a Carlo Merlo, il maestro delle Star (2011)

==== Music videos ====
- Non lo so (2017)
- DAG (2020)

== Theatreography ==
=== Playwright ===
- Dalla notte del mito all'Eneide, nei luoghi e nei tempi di Virgilio

=== Actor ===
- Nessuno mi ha reso cieco (2004)
- Medea di Euripide (2005)
- Fratres Arvales (2005)
- Dalla notte del mito all'Eneide, nei luoghi e nei tempi di Virgilio (2012)

== Discography ==
=== Studio albums ===
- Il cannocchiale (2016)
- Vicini margini (2024)

=== Notable singles ===
- Paolo a Francesca (2016)
- Conserva i sogni (2017)
- Milena and Il bambino di Aleppo (2019)
- Comico dell'arte, GPB, DAG (2020)
- Poema vocale, Malbene (2021)
- Così scappi da te (2022)
- Come a Hollywood, Vicini margini (2023)
- Elettronica (2024)
