= Spits (newspaper) =

Public transport magazine

- Type: Daily newspaper
- Format: Tabloid
- Owner: Telegraaf Media Groep
- Editor: Willem Schouten
- Founded: 21 June 1999
- Ceased publication: 10 October 2014
- Political alignment: Populist, Right wing
- Language: Dutch
- Headquarters: Amsterdam
- Circulation: 431,431 (July 2007)
- Price: Free
- Website: www.spitsnieuws.nl

Spits (Dutch pronunciation: [spɪts]; English: Peak/Rush Hour; stylized as Sp!ts) was a tabloid format newspaper freely distributed in trains, trams and buses in the Netherlands from 1999 to 2014. Its competitor was Metro.
