= Darin discography =

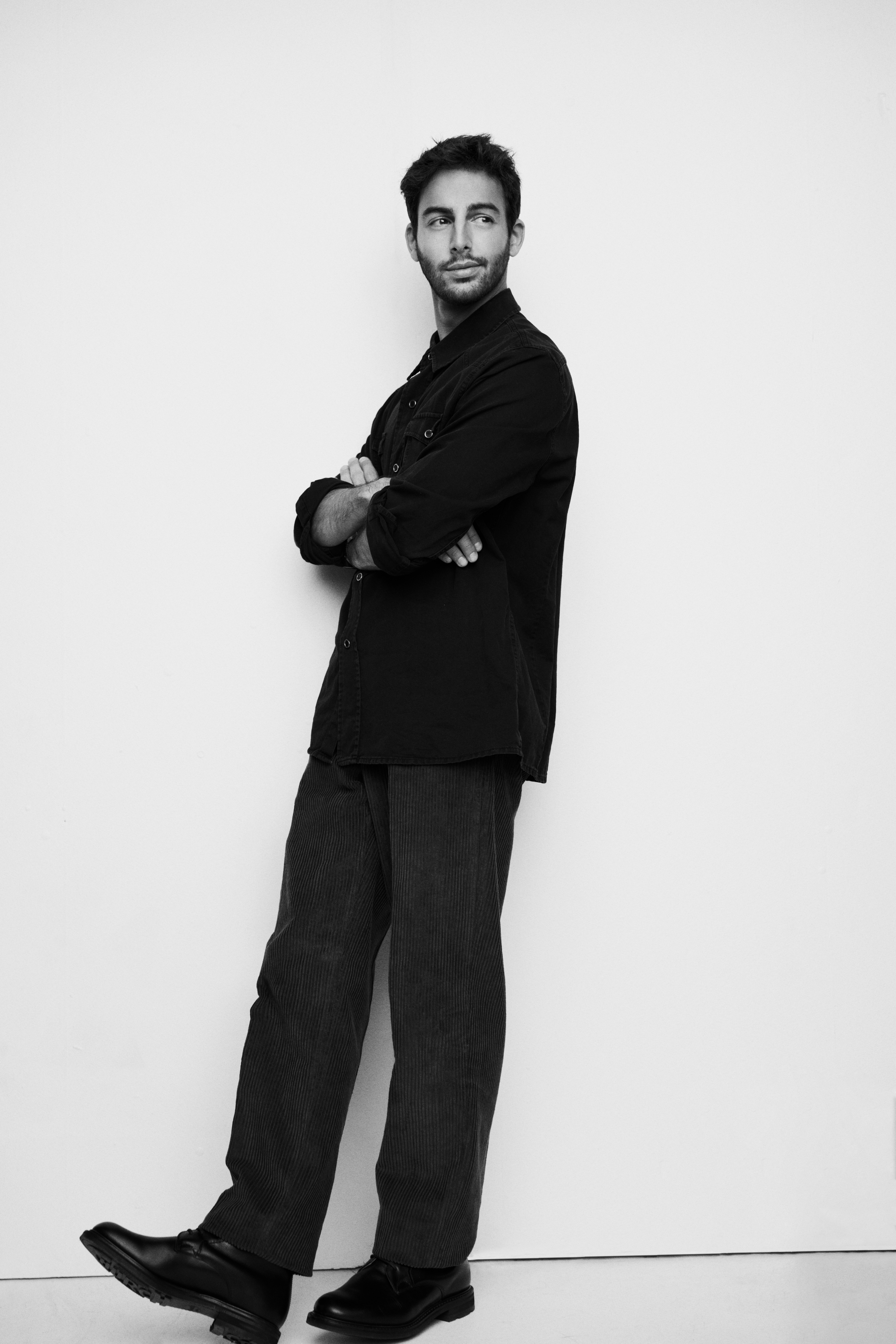
- Darin (2020)
- Studio albums: 9
- Extended plays: 1
- Live albums: 2
- Singles: 53
- Video albums: 1
- Music videos: 15

The discography of Darin, a Swedish pop singer, consists of nine studio albums, two live albums and 53 official singles.

== Albums ==
=== Studio albums ===
List of studio albums, with selected chart positions and certifications
| Title | Album details | Peak chart positions | | | Certifications |
| Title | Album details | SWE | FIN | GER | Certifications |
|---|---|---|---|---|---|
| The Anthem | Released: 16 February 2005; Label: RCA/BMG (82876 67652 2); Formats: CD, digital download | 1 | — | — | GLF: Gold |
| Darin | Released: 28 September 2005; Label: Columbia/Sony Music (828767365428); Formats: CD, digital download | 1 | 13 | — | GLF: Platinum |
| Break the News | Released: 22 November 2006; Label: Columbia/Sony Music (886970159623); Formats: CD, digital download | 1 | — | 89 | GLF: Gold |
| Flashback | Released: 3 December 2008; Label: Epic (88697415982); Formats: CD, digital download | 10 | — | — | |
| Lovekiller | Released: 18 August 2010; Label: Universal Music (060252745612); Formats: CD, digital download | 1 | — | — | GLF: Gold |
| Exit | Released: 30 January 2013; Label: Universal Music (060253728170); Formats: CD, digital download | 1 | — | — | GLF: Gold |
| Fjärilar i magen | Released: 25 September 2015; Label: Dex Music/Sony Music (888751227224); Formats: LP, CD, digital download | 1 | — | — | GLF: Platinum |
| Tvillingen | Released: 24 November 2017; Label: Dex Music; Formats: CD, digital download | 1 | — | — | GLF: Platinum |
| En annan jag | Released: 15 September 2023; Label: Universal Music; Formats: LP, CD, digital download | 1 | — | — | GLF: Gold |
| Sommarland | Released: 22 August 2025; Label: Dex Music; Formats: CD, digital download | 2 | — | — | |
"—" denotes releases that did not chart or were not released in that country

=== Live albums ===
List of live albums
| Title | Album details |
|---|---|
| Fjärilar i magen — Live från Cirkus | Released: 7 July 2016; Label: Dex Music, Sony; Formats: digital download |
| Live from Ericsson Globe | Released: 4 December 2020; Label: Dex Music; Formats: digital download |

=== Compilation albums ===
List of compilation albums, with selected chart positions
| Title | Album details | Peak chart positions |
| Title | Album details | SWE |
|---|---|---|
| Original Album Classics | Released: 24 January 2011; Label: Sony Music Entertainment; Formats: CD | — |
| The Collection | Released: 2 November 2012; Label: Sony Music Entertainment; Formats: Digital Download | — |
| Det bästa av | Released: 21 November 2012; Label: Epic; Formats: CD | — |
| Tolkningarna | Released: September 2013; Label: Universal Music; Formats: Digital Download | 43 |
| Lugna Favoriter | Released: 19 May 2025; Label: Universal Music; Formats: Digital Download | - |

== EPs ==
List of EPs
| Title | EP details |
|---|---|
| Fjärilar i magen — Akustisk EP | Released: 24 June 2016; Label: Dex Music, Sony; Formats: digital download |
| My Purple Clouds | Released: 9 December 2022; Label: Dex Music; Formats: digital download, streaming |

== Singles ==
List of singles as a lead artist, with selected chart positions and certifications
| Year | Title | Peak chart positions | | | | | Certifications | Album |
| Year | Title | SWE | AUT | FIN | GER | UK Digital | Certifications | Album |
|---|---|---|---|---|---|---|---|---|
| 2005 | "Money for Nothing" | 1 | — | — | — | — | GLF: Platinum | The Anthem |
| 2005 | "Why Does It Rain" | 5 | — | — | — | — | | The Anthem |
| 2005 | "Step Up" | 1 | — | 9 | — | — | GLF: Gold | Darin |
| 2005 | "Who's That Girl" | 6 | — | 20 | — | — | | Darin |
| 2006 | "Want Ya!" | 4 | — | 8 | — | — | | Darin |
| 2006 | "Perfect" | 3 | — | 4 | — | — | | Break the News |
| 2007 | "Everything But the Girl" | 38 | — | — | — | — | | Break the News |
| 2007 | "Desire" | — | — | — | 53 | — | | Break the News |
| 2007 | "Insanity" | — | 47 | — | 20 | — | | Break the News |
| 2008 | "Breathing Your Love" (feat. Kat DeLuna) | 2 | — | 13 | — | — | GLF: Gold | Flashback |
| 2009 | "See U at the Club" | 12 | — | — | — | — | | Flashback |
| 2009 | "Runaway" | 11 | — | — | — | — | | Flashback |
| 2009 | "What If" (with Friends) | 51 | — | — | — | — | | Flashback |
| 2009 | "Karma" | — | — | — | — | — | | Flashback |
| 2009 | "Viva la Vida" | 1 | — | — | — | — | GLF: Gold | Lovekiller |
| 2010 | "You're Out of My Life" | 3 | — | — | — | — | GLF: Gold | Lovekiller |
| 2010 | "Can't Stop Love" | 13 | — | — | — | — | | Lovekiller |
| 2010 | "Lovekiller" | 6 | — | — | — | — | | Lovekiller |
| 2012 | "Nobody Knows" | — (Note: "Nobody Knows" did not enter the Sverigetopplistan singles chart, but peaked at number one on the Swedish Digital Singles Chart.) | — | — | — | — | GLF: Platinum | Exit |
| 2013 | "Playing With Fire" | 28 | — | — | — | — | GLF: Gold | Exit |
| 2013 | "So Yours" | — | — | — | — | — | | Non-album single |
| 2013 | "Check You Out" | — | — | — | — | — | | Exit |
| 2014 | "Dream Away" (Eagle-Eye Cherry & Darin) | 30 | — | — | — | — | GLF: Platinum | SOS Barnbyar – En resa för livet |
| 2014 | "Mamma Mia" (feat. Prophet of 7Lions) | — (Note: "Mamma Mia" did not enter the Sverigetopplistan singles chart, but peaked at number 12 on the Swedish Digital Singles Chart.) | — | — | — | — | | Non-album single |
| 2015 | "Ta mig tillbaka" | 11 | — | — | — | — | GLF: 5× Platinum | Fjärilar i magen |
| 2015 | "Juliet" | 32 | — | — | — | — | GLF: Platinum | Fjärilar i magen |
| 2015 | "Lagom" | 79 | — | — | — | — | GLF: Gold | Fjärilar i magen |
| 2017 | "Ja må du leva" | 25 | — | — | — | — | GLF: 2× Platinum | Tvillingen |
| 2017 | "Tvillingen" | 21 | — | — | — | — | GLF: Platinum | Tvillingen |
| 2017 | "Alla ögon på mig" | — (Note: "Alla ögon på mig" did not enter the Sverigetopplistan singles chart, but peaked at number three on the Sverigetopplistan Heatseeker chart.) | — | — | — | — | GLF: Gold | Tvillingen |
| 2017 | "Rädda mig" | — (Note: "Rädda mig" did not enter the Sverigetopplistan singles chart, but peaked at number 12 on the Sverigetopplistan Heatseeker chart.) | — | — | — | — | | Tvillingen |
| 2018 | "Astronaut" | 70 | — | — | — | — | | Non-album singles |
| 2018 | "Identitetslös" | 53 | — | — | — | — | GLF: Gold | Non-album singles |
| 2019 | "Hög" | 33 | — | — | — | — | GLF: Platinum | Non-album singles |
| 2019 | "Finns inga ord" | 88 | — | — | — | — | GLF: Gold | Non-album singles |
| 2020 | "En säng av rosor" | 7 | — | — | — | — | GLF: 4× Platinum | Non-album singles |
| 2021 | "Can't Stay Away" | 73 | — | — | — | — | | My Purple Clouds |
| 2021 | "Holding Me More" | 64 | — | — | — | — | | Non-album singles |
| 2021 | "What's Christmas Anyway" | 60 | — | — | — | — | | Non-album singles |
| 2022 | "Superstar" | — | — | — | — | — | | My Purple Clouds |
| 2022 | "Vi är på riktigt" (with Laleh) | 25 | — | — | — | — | | En annan jag |
| 2022 | "Satisfaction" | — (Note: "Satisfaction" did not enter the Swedish Singellista Chart, but peaked at number 17 on the Swedish Heatseeker Chart.) | — | — | — | — | | My Purple Clouds |
| 2022 | "What’s the Point" | 8 | — | — | — | — | GLF: Gold | Non-album single |
| 2023 | "Starkare" | 20 | — | — | — | — | GLF: Platinum | En annan jag |
| 2023 | "Satellit" | 62 | — | — | — | — | | En annan jag |
| 2023 | "Den sista sången" | 16 | — | — | — | — | | En annan jag |
| 2024 | "Electric" | 40 | — | — | — | 56 | | Non-album singles |
| 2024 | "Moonlight" | 95 | — | — | — | — | | Non-album singles |
| 2024 | "Fantasi" | 48 | — | — | — | — | | Non-album singles |
| 2025 | "Det sista jag behöver" | 34 | — | — | — | — | | Non-album singles |
| 2025 | "Mimosa" | 8 | — | — | — | — | | Sommarland |
| 2025 | "Sommarland" | — (Note: "Sommarland" did not enter the Swedish Singellista Chart, but peaked at number 1 on the Swedish Heatseeker Chart.) | — | — | — | — | | Sommarland |
| 2025 | "Springer ikapp" | — (Note: "Springer ikapp" did not enter the Swedish Singellista Chart, but peaked at number 6 on the Swedish Heatseeker Chart.) | — | — | — | — | | Sommarland |

== Other charted songs ==
List of other charted songs and certifications
| Year | Title | Peak chart positions | Certifications | Album |
| Year | Title | SWE | Certifications | Album |
|---|---|---|---|---|
| 2006 | "Homeless" | 52 | | Break the News |
| 2009 | "Seasons Fly" | 57 | | Flashback |
| 2010 | "Microphone" | 15 | | Lovekiller |
| 2012 | "Stockholm" | 13 | GLF: Platinum | Tolkningarna |
| 2012 | "En apa som liknar dig" | 1 | GLF: 3× Platinum | Tolkningarna |
| 2012 | "I Can't Get You Off My Mind" | 36 | GLF: Gold | Tolkningarna |
| 2012 | "Astrologen" | 2 | GLF: 3× Platinum | Tolkningarna |
| 2012 | "Seven Days a Week" | 36 | | Tolkningarna |
| 2015 | "Göteborg" | — (Note: "Göteborg" did not enter the Swedish Singellista Chart, but peaked at number one on the Swedish Heatseeker Chart.) | GLF: Gold | Fjärilar i magen |
| 2025 | "Allt jag har" | 53 | | Sommarland |
