= Det bästa av =

Album by Darin Zanyar

Det Bästa Av

Greatest hits album by Darin
- Released: 21 November 2012 (CD) (Sweden)
- Recorded: 2004–2008
- Genre: Pop, dance
- Label: Sony Music Sweden/Epic

Darin chronology
Lovekiller (2010)	Det Bästa Av (2012)	Exit (2013)

Det Bästa Av (The Best Of) is a greatest hits album by Swedish singer Darin Zanyar, released in November 2012 by Sony Music Sweden, two years after Darin moved to Universal Music Sweden.

== Background ==
The album contains many of Darin's singles from his time signed to Sony Music. There are 16 songs from all four of his Sony released albums: The Anthem, Darin, Break The News and Flashback. Darin left Sony Music and signed to Universal Music Sweden in 2009.

== Track listing ==
No.	Title	Writer(s)	Original Album	Length
1.	"Step Up"	Bilal Hajji, RedOne, Darin	Darin	3:07
2.	"Money For Nothing"	Robin Carlsson, Remee, Johan Ekhé, Ulf Lindström	The Anthem	3:00
3.	"Perfect"	Anders Wikström, Fredrik Thomander, Robbie Nevil	Break The News	3:00
4.	"Breathing Your Love (featuring Kat Deluna)"	Darin, Hajji, Novel, RedOne	Flashback	3:53
5.	"Who's That Girl?"	Jörgen Elofsson	Darin	3:26
6.	"Why Does It Rain?"	Elofsson, Anja	The Anthem	4:07
7.	"Like No One"	Patrik Berger, Fredrik Berger	Break The News	3:30
8.	"Want Ya!"	Tomas Granlind, George Samuelson	Darin	3:19
9.	"Be What You Wanna Be"	Hajji, RedOne, Darin	Darin	3:30
10.	"What If I Kissed You Now"	Anders Hansson, Molly Sandén	Break The News	3:29
11.	"What Is Love"	Niclas Widahl, Pontus Söderqvist, Tymes 4, RedOne, Darin	The Anthem	2:41
12.	"Stand By Me"	Max Martin, Alexandra Talomaa	The Anthem	3:11
13.	"See U At The Club"	Darin, Bilal Hajji, Novel, RedOne	Flashback	3:50
14.	"Runaway"	David Jassy, Magnus Wallbert, Stefan Gräslund, Darin	Flashback	3:02
15.	"Homeless"	Elofsson	Break The News	3:40
16.	"Coming True"	Elofsson	The Anthem	3:40
Total length:				54:18
