= Mamma Mia (Darin song) =

Single by Darin featuring Prophet of 7Lions
- Released: April 14, 2014
- Recorded: 2014
- Genre: Pop
- Length: 3:35
- Label: Warner Music Sweden
- Songwriter(s): Rachid Aziz, BeetGeek, Mika "Prophet" Guillory, Darin Zanyar

Darin singles chronology
"Dream Away" (2014)	"Mamma Mia" (2014)	"Ta mig tillbaka" (2015)

Music video
- "Mamma Mia" on YouTube

"Mamma Mia" is a song by Swedish singer and songwriter Darin featuring vocals by rapper Prophet of 7Lions. It was released on April 14, 2014 in the Nordic countries in occasion of his 10-year anniversary as an artist. It's Darin's first single with Warner Music Sweden. The song was originally written for Darin's sixth studio album Exit, but it didn't make the final cut.

== Background and release ==
On March 14, 2014 Darin announced via his Instagram account the release of a new single called Mamma Mia, along with a competition which consisted of sharing a picture on the social network in order to win an exclusive ticket for the premiere of the music video of the song which would take place in a secret venue in Stockholm two days before the single release. A trailer of the music video was also posted on Darin's official YouTube channel the same day. Winners were contacted by Darin himself on April 2 and the event took place in a cinema in Stockholm called Rigoletto on April 12.

A seven track EP called Mamma Mia - Remixes was released on June 18, 2014.

== Music video ==
The music video of the single was released on 21 April on Darin's YouTube channel. It was directed by Alex Herron and filmed in Palmdale, California. As stated by the director himself, "the video feels as if it's a love story in the beginning but then it starts to escalate and she's a Mamma Mia, she's the ultimate crazy woman. They rob a bank, she strips for him. It's pretty dirty, it's pretty good". The production of the video costed 500,000 Swedish crowns.

== Charts ==
Chart (2014)	Peak position
Swedish Digital Singles Chart (DigiListan)	12

== Release history ==
Region	Date	Label	Format
Various	14 April 2014	Warner Music Sweden	Digital Download
