= So Yours =

Single by Darin
- Released: 22 February 2013
- Recorded: 2012
- Genre: Pop
- Length: 2:46
- Label: One Night Recordings
- Songwriters: Niklas Bergwall, Darin Zanyar

Darin singles chronology
| "Playing With Fire" (2013) | "So Yours" (2013) | "Check You Out" (2013) |

"So Yours" is a song by Swedish singer and songwriter Darin. It was released as a single on 22 February 2013 in Germany, Austria and Switzerland and all over Europe on 14 May. This is Darin's third single to get released outside the Scandinavian area, after "Insanity" and "Desire" which were both released as singles, taken from the album Break the News in Germany, Austria and Switzerland in 2007. "So Yours" was written by Darin and Niklas Bergwall.

Despite being recorded for his sixth studio album Exit (released in Sweden, Finland and Norway in January 2013), the song was not included in the album's final track listing. On 27 February 2013 Darin's German record label confirmed that a music video for "So Yours" was going to be made. On 4 March 2013, Darin announced via his Twitter account that he was in Los Angeles to record the video clip for the single. The video was released on 26 March 2013 on Darin's YouTube channel.

On 14 May 2013, the song was released throughout all of Europe under Darin's own record label Dex Music, along with the single "Nobody Knows". On 16 May, Darin performed the two songs in a medley at the Eurovision Song Contest 2013 in Malmö, Sweden, as part of the interval act of the second semifinal.

== Charts ==
| Chart (2013) | Peak position |
|---|---|
| Belgium (Ultratip 100 Flanders) | 32 |
| Belgium (Ultratip 50 Wallonia) | 38 |

== Release history ==
| Region | Date | Label | Format |
|---|---|---|---|
| Germany | 22 February 2013 | One Night Recordings | Digital Download |
| Austria | 22 February 2013 | One Night Recordings | Digital Download |
| Switzerland | 22 February 2013 | One Night Recordings | Digital Download |
| France | 22 February 2013 | One Night Recordings | Digital Download |
| Bulgaria | 8 March 2013 | One Night Recordings | Digital Download |
| Belgium | 29 March 2013 | One Night Recordings | Digital Download |
| Sweden | 13 May 2013 | One Night Recordings | Digital Download |
| Europe | 14 May 2013 | Dex Music - X5 Music Group | Digital Download |
