= You're Out of My Life =

Single by Darin

from the album LoveKiller
- Released: 28 February 2010
- Recorded: 2009
- Genre: Pop
- Length: 3:18
- Label: Universal Music Sweden
- Songwriter(s): Henrik Janson, Tony Nilsson
- Producer(s): Arnthor Birgisson

Darin singles chronology
"What If" (2009)	"You're Out of My Life" (2010)	"Can't Stop Love" (2010)

"You're Out of My Life" is a song recorded by Swedish singer Darin and was Darin's entry in Melodifestivalen 2010. The song was first performed in Deltävling 3 (Heat 3) of Melodifestivalen in Gothenburg on 20 February 2010 where Darin reached second place and progressed to the final on March 13 in Stockholm. The single was released on 28 February 2010. This is Darin's first physical single release since his departure from Sony Music.

== History ==
On 3 November 2009, it was announced that Darin would be participating in the Melodifestivalen 2010, the Swedish show thatg determines the country's entry to the Eurovision Song Contest 2010 in Oslo, Norway. Darin entered with the mid-tempo ballad "You're Out of My Life" written by Tony Nilsson and Henrik Janson who wrote Velvet's The Queen for the 2009 edition. Darin performed 7th in Deltävling 3 (Heat 3) of Melodifestivalen.

There was worry that Darin's song "You're Out of My Life" would be disqualified after it was incorrectly made available to purchase during the week after the semi-final. A total of 54 downloads of the full studio version were made, making a #95 entry into the Swedish singles chart. However, SVT confirmed that Darin would not be disqualified as the mistake was made by the distributor and not by Darin or his management. The song was immediately taken off the music store, and was officially released along with the rest of the Melodifestivalen songs.

The song progressed to the second round of voting, after which Darin was voted through to the final, coming second in the heat after girl group Timoteij with their song "Kom". Darin participated in the Melodifestivalen final on 13 March 2010, at Globe Arena in Stockholm, where he finished in fourth place with a total of 117 points, receiving two sets of 12 points from the Greek and Russian juries.

== Track listing ==
Digital Download:

1. You're Out of My Life 03:18 (Henrik Janson, Tony Nilsson)

CD Single:

1. You're Out of My Life 3:18 (Henrik Janson, Tony Nilsson)
2. Viva La Vida 4:33 (Guy Berryman, Jonny Buckland, Will Champion, Chris Martin)

== Charts ==
The single debuted and peaked at number 3 on the Swedish Singles Chart, charting behind Anna Bergendahl's and Eric Saade's Melodifestivalen 2010 singles.

=== Weekly charts ===
Chart (2010)	Peak position
Sweden (Sverigetopplistan)	3

=== Year-end charts ===
Chart (2010)	Position
Sweden (Sverigetopplistan)	59

== Certifications ==
Certifications for "You're Out of My Life"
Region	Certification	Certified units/sales
Sweden (GLF)	Gold	20,000^{‡}
^{‡} Sales+streaming figures based on certification alone.

== Release history ==
Region	Date	Label	Format
Sweden	28 February 2010	Universal Music Sweden	CD; Digital Download
