= Can't Stay Away (Darin song) =

Single by Darin
- Released: 28 May 2021
- Length: 3:00
- Label: Dex Music
- Songwriter(s): Darin Zanyar; Jamie Hartman; Matthew Burns

Darin singles chronology
"En säng av rosor" (2020)	"Can't Stay Away" (2021)	"Holding Me More" (2021)

"Can't Stay Away" is a song by Swedish artist, Darin. It was released on 28 May 2021 and is his first English-language single in seven years. The song debuted on the Swedish chart at number 73.

== Charts ==
Chart (2021)	Peak position
Sweden (Sverigetopplistan)	73
