= Playing with Fire (Darin song) =

2013 single by Darin Zanyar

"Playing With Fire"

Single by Darin

from the album Exit
- Released: 18 January 2013
- Recorded: 2012
- Genre: Electropop; dance-pop
- Length: 3:25
- Label: Universal Music Sweden
- Songwriter(s): Darin, Jim Beanz, J Nick
- Producer(s): Jim Beanz, J Nick

Darin singles chronology
"Nobody Knows" (2012)	"Playing With Fire" (2013)	"So Yours" (2013)

"Playing With Fire" a song by the Swedish singer Darin, released as the second single from his sixth studio album Exit. The song was written by Darin, Jim Beanz and J Nick, and was produced by the latter two.

The single was released on 18 January 2013 as a digital download. Darin posted a preview of the song on his YouTube channel three days before its release and a longer video preview was posted by the Swedish tabloid Aftonbladet. In the video, showing the recording of the song in the studio, Darin says that it was the first song he wrote with Jim Beanz during his trip to the USA and that he eventually chose it to be the second single for the album.

== Charts ==
Chart (2013)	Peak position
Sweden (Sverigetopplistan)	28

== Certifications ==
Certifications for "Playing with Fire"
Region	Certification	Certified units/sales
Sweden (GLF)	Gold	20,000^{‡}
^{‡} Sales+streaming figures based on certification alone.

== Release history ==
Region	Date	Label	Format
Various	18 January 2013	Universal Music Sweden	Digital Download
