= En annan jag =

Studio album by Darin
- Released: 15 September 2023
- Recorded: 2023
- Genre: Pop; Acoustic
- Length: 32:40
- Language: Swedish
- Label: Dex Music; Universal Music Group

Darin chronology
Tvillingen (2017)	En annan jag (2023)	Sommarland (2025)

Singles from En annan jag
- 1. "Starkare" Released: 5 May 2023; 2. "Satellit" Released: 4 August 2023; 3. "Den sista sången" Released: 15 September 2023

En annan jag (English translation: Another me) is the ninth studio album by Swedish singer/songwriter Darin, released on 15 September 2023 by his own record label Dex Music and distributed by Universal Music Group. The album contains only Swedish-language songs.

== Singles ==
On 5 May 2023, Darin released "Starkare" ("Stronger" in English) as the lead single from the album. The official music video was released on 9 May 2023. The single charted at number 20 on the Sverigetopplistan.

The second single, "Satellit" ("Satellite") was released on 4 August 2023 and peaked at number 62 in Sweden.

== Live performances ==
Darin performed "Satellit" on Allsångsscenen är din på Skansen.

== Track listing ==
Credits adapted from Spotify.

En annan jag track listing
No.	Title	Writer(s)	Length
1.	"Om du var min"	Darin Zanyar	3:08
2.	"Högre än allt"	Zanyar	3:19
3.	"Den sista sången"	Zanyar; Maria Jane Smith; Victor Thell	2:45
4.	"Behöver inte nån"	Zanyar	2:55
5.	"Kommer aldrig över dig"	Zanyar	3:02
6.	"Starkare"	Zanyar	2:25
7.	"Satellit"	Zanyar	3:01
8.	"Vi Är På Riktigt"	Zanyar; Gustaf Thörn; Laleh Pourkarim	3:08
9.	"Krossar allt"	Zanyar	2:10
10.	"Det kommer alltid vara du"	Zanyar	3:20
11.	"En annan jag"	Zanyar	3:23
Total length:			32:40

== Charts ==
=== Weekly charts ===
Weekly chart performance for En annan jag
Chart (2023)	Peak position
Swedish Albums (Sverigetopplistan)	1

=== Year-end charts ===
Year-end chart performance for En annan jag
Chart (2024)	Position
Swedish Albums (Sverigetopplistan)	83

== Certifications ==
Certifications for En annan jag
Region	Certification	Certified units/sales
Sweden (GLF)	Gold	15,000^{‡}
^{‡} Sales+streaming figures based on certification alone.

== Release history ==
Release history for En annan jag
Region	Date	Format	Label
Various	15 September 2023	CD; digital download; streaming; LP	Dex Music; Universal Music Group
