= Tvillingen =

Studio album by Darin
- Released: 24 November 2017
- Recorded: 2017
- Genre: Pop; acoustic
- Length: 33:35
- Language: Swedish
- Label: Dex Music
- Producer: Darin Zanyar; Ollie Olson; David Lindgren Zacharias; Smith & Thell; Lars Halapi; Peter Kvint

Darin chronology
Fjärilar i magen (2015)	Tvillingen (2017)	En annan jag (2023)

Singles from Tvillingen
- 1. "Ja må du leva" Released: March 2017; 2. "Alla ögon på mig" Released: September 2017; 3. "Tvillingen" Released: September 2017

Tvillingen (English translation: The Twin) is the eighth studio album by Swedish singer/songwriter Darin, released on 24 November 2017 by his own record label Dex Music and distributed by Sony Music. It is the second of Darin's albums to entirely contain Swedish songs, with the first being Fjärilar i magen, which was released on 25 September 2015. Before the release of the album, the single "Ja må du leva" had been certified double platinum in Sweden and the single "Tvillingen" had been certified gold. Subsequently, the album reached number one on the Swedish album chart in the first week following its release and was certified platinum in the end of 2017.

== Background ==
The title of the album (in English "Gemini") was chosen with regard to the way that the album reflects Darin's different personalities and since it is his star sign. After the success of his previous release, Darin was interested in releasing another album with more personal songs and lyrics. He continued with releasing music in Swedish since for him it makes it easier to bring up themes that are important to him and also makes it easier for his audience to understand his work.

== Critical reception ==
Professional ratings
Review scores
Source	Rating
Aftonbladet	3/5 stars
Dagens Nyheter	2/5 stars
Dagens Industri	4/5 stars
Expressen	3/5 stars

The album was generally well received by Swedish music critics, with many reviewers praising the tone of the album and the production, while some were critical towards Darin's new musical direction.

== Track listing ==
Credits adapted from Spotify.

Tvillingen track listing
No.	Title	Writer(s)	Length
1.	"Rädda mig"	Zanyar; David Lindgren Zacharias; Ollie Olson	3:46
2.	"Tvillingen"	Zanyar; Zacharias; Olson	3:02
3.	"Ja må du leva"	Zanyar; Peter Kvint	3:23
4.	"Mardröm" (featuring Smith & Thell)	Zanyar; Maria Smith; Victor Thell	3:10
5.	"Alla ögon på mig"	Zanyar; Zacharias; Olson	3:37
6.	"Den här sången"	Zanyar; Lars Halapi	3:51
7.	"Man över bord"	Zanyar; Kvint	3:01
8.	"Palmerna i stan"	Zanyar; Zacharias; Olson	3:08
9.	"Paraply"	Zanyar; Zacharias; Olson	3:39
10.	"Allt som vi sa"	Zanyar; Zacharias; Olson	2:44
Total length:			33:35

== Personnel ==
Credits adapted from Spotify.

- Darin Zanyar – vocals (all tracks), production (tracks 1, 4–5, 7, 9) songwriting (all tracks).
- David Lindgren Zacharias – production (1, 3, 5, 7, 9), songwriting (tracks 1–2, 5 and 8–10).
- Ollie Olson – production (tracks 1, 5, 8, 9), songwriting (tracks 1–2, 5 and 8–10).
- Lars Halapi – songwriting and production (track 6).
- Peter Kvint – songwriting (tracks 3 and 7).
- Smith & Thell – vocals (track 4), production (tracks 2, 3 and 10).

== Charts ==
=== Weekly charts ===
Weekly chart performance for Tvillingen
Chart Chart (2017–2018)	Peak position
Swedish Albums (Sverigetopplistan)	1

=== Year-end charts ===
Year-end chart performance for Tvillingen
Chart (2018)	Position
Swedish Albums (Sverigetopplistan)	63

== Certifications ==
Certifications for Tvillingen
Region	Certification	Certified units/sales
Sweden (GLF)	Platinum	40,000^{‡}
^{‡} Sales+streaming figures based on certification alone.

== Release history ==
Release history for Tvillingen
Region	Date	Format	Label	Catalgoue
Various	24 November 2017	CD; digital download; streaming; LP	Dex Music	88985489811/88985489812
