= Fjärilar i magen =

Studio album by Darin
- Released: 25 September 2015
- Recorded: March 2015
- Studio: Atlantis, Stockholm, Sweden
- Genre: Pop; folk music; acoustic
- Length: 38:55
- Language: Swedish
- Label: Dex Music
- Producer: Darin Zanyar; Ollie Olson; David Lindgren Zacharias

Darin chronology
Exit (2013)	Fjärilar i magen (2015)	Tvillingen (2017)

Singles from Fjärilar i magen
- 1. "Ta mig tillbaka" Released: March 2015; 2. "Juliet" Released: July 2015; 3. "Lagom" Released: January 2016

Fjärilar i magen (English translation: Butterflies in the stomach) is the seventh studio album by Swedish singer/songwriter Darin, released on 25 September 2015 by his own record label Dex Music and distributed by Sony Music. It is the first album by Darin to entirely consist of Swedish songs. The album peaked at number one on the Swedish Albums Chart and was certified platinum.

The album was inspired by folk-music, a genre that marked new territory for Darin. Fjärilar i magen was recorded at the Atlantis Studios in Stockholm.

== Background ==
After participating in the recording of a tribute album for the late musician Ted Gärdestad, in which Darin sang in Swedish, he wanted to make an album containing Swedish songs. He was also interested in creating Swedish music after he participated in the Swedish show Så mycket bättre, in which he sang Swedish songs.

== Critical reception ==
Professional ratings
Review scores
Source	Rating
Aftonbladet	3/5 stars
Dagens Nyheter	2/5 stars
Expressen	2/5 stars
Nöjesguiden	3/5 stars

Fjärilar i magen received generally mixed reviews from Swedish music critics, with many praising the first half of the album while criticizing the second half.

== Track listing ==
Credits adapted from Spotify.

Fjärilar i magen track listing
No.	Title	Writer(s)	Length
1.	"Lagom"	Darin Zanyar; Tony Nilsson	3:30
2.	"Ta mig tillbaka"	Zanyar; David Lindgren Zacharias; Ollie Olson	3:10
3.	"Juliet"	Zanyar; Lindgren Zacharias; Olson	3:35
4.	"Göteborg"	Zanyar; Lindgren Zacharias; Olson	4:08
5.	"Följa John"	Zanyar; Peter Kvint	3:05
6.	"Vilse i dig"	Zanyar; Lindgren Zacharias; Olson	2:55
7.	"Tänk dig"	Zanyar; Kvint	4:07
8.	"I din hand"	Zanyar; Kvint	2:54
9.	"Kom med mig"	Zanyar; Kvint	3:12
10.	"Vintern"	Zanyar; Lindgren Zacharias; Olson	4:34
11.	"Nattmänniska"	Zanyar; Lindgren Zacharias; Olson	3:46
Total length:			38:55

== Personnel ==
Credits adapted from Spotify.

- Darin Zanyar – vocals, production, songwriting (all tracks)
- David Lindgren Zacharias – production (all tracks), songwriting (tracks 2–4, 6 and 10–11)
- Ollie Olson – production (all tracks), songwriting (tracks 2–4, 6 and 10–11)
- Peter Kvint – songwriting (tracks 5 and 7–9).
- Tony Nilsson – songwriting (track 1)

== Charts ==
=== Weekly charts ===
Weekly chart performance for Fjärilar i magen
Chart (2015–2017)	Peak position
Swedish Albums (Sverigetopplistan)	1

=== Year-end charts ===
Year-end chart performance for Fjärilar i magen
Chart (2015)	Position
Swedish Albums (Sverigetopplistan)	28
Chart (2016)	Position
Swedish Albums (Sverigetopplistan)	41

== Certifications ==
Certifications for Fjärilar i magen
Region	Certification	Certified units/sales
Sweden (GLF)	Platinum	40,000^{‡}
^{‡} Sales+streaming figures based on certification alone.

== Release history ==
Release history for Fjärilar i magen
Region	Date	Format	Label	Catalogue
Various	15 September 2015	CD; digital download; streaming; LP	Dex Music	88875122721 /88875122722
