= Microphone (Darin song) =

Song by Darin
- Released: August 16, 2010 (Sweden)
- Recorded: 2010
- Genre: Pop
- Length: 3:30
- Label: Universal Music Sweden
- Songwriters: Darin, Tony Nilsson
- Producers: Darin, Tony Nilsson

Microphone is a song by Darin Zanyar from his album Lovekiller. The song was not released as an official single but due to strong digital downloads of the song upon the release of Darin's album Lovekiller on 18 August 2010, the song entered on Swedish Charts at number 16 on the week of 27 August 2010. The song peaked at number 15 on the third week.

"Microphone" was written and produced by Darin and Tony Nilsson. Microphone was first heard live on 14 August 2010 when Darin performed the song on Sommarkrysset 2010. Darin performed the song across Sweden to promote the album Lovekiller. The song had been used in a promotional video for the 2010 season of Idol.

== Charts ==
Chart (2010)	Peak position
Sweden (Sverigetopplistan)	15
