= Sommarland =

Studio album by Darin
- Released: 22 August 2025
- Length: 30:19
- Language: Swedish
- Label: Dex Music; Universal Music Group

Darin chronology
En annan jag (2023)	Sommarland (2025)

Singles from Sommarland
- 1. "Mimosa" Released: 9 May 2025; 2. "Sommarland" Released: 13 June 2025; 3. "Springer ikapp" Released: 18 July 2025

Sommarland is the tenth studio album by Swedish singer-songwriter Darin, released on 22 August 2025 by his own record label Dex Music and distributed by Universal Music Group. The album was announced on 13 June 2025, alongside its title track.

== Track listing ==
Sommarland track listing
No.	Title	Length
1.	"Springer ikapp"	3:34
2.	"Mimosa"	3:12
3.	"Sommarland"	2:43
4.	"Galway Bay"	3:03
5.	"Den blomstertid nu kommer" (interlude)	1:13
6.	"När himlarna faller"	3:39
7.	"Allt jag har"	2:52
8.	"Luta dig tillbaks"	3:11
9.	"Illusioner"	3:44
10.	"Perfekt"	3:08
Total length:		30:19

== Charts ==
Chart performance for Sommarland
Chart (2025)	Peak position
Swedish Albums (Sverigetopplistan)	2
