= En säng av rosor =

Single by Darin
- Language: Swedish
- English title: "A Bed of Roses"
- B-side: "edvin Edvin Edvin Edvin SDS 1285 1400 Edvin"
- Released: 7 February 2020
- Length: 3:42
- Label: Dex Music
- Songwriters: Darin Zanyar; Peter Kvint
- Producer: Peter Kvint

Darin singles chronology
"Finns inga ord" (2019)	"En säng av rosor" (2020)	"Can't Stay Away" (2021)

"En säng av rosor" is a song written by Darin and Peter Kvint. It was recorded by Darin Zanyar and released as a digital single on 7 February 2020. The song entered Svensktoppen on 23 February 2020.

== Charts ==
=== Weekly charts ===
Chart (2020)	Peak position
Sweden (Sverigetopplistan)	7

=== Year-end charts ===
Chart (2020)	Position
Sweden (Sverigetopplistan)	7

Chart (2021)	Position
Sweden (Sverigetopplistan)	58

== Certifications ==
Region	Certification	Certified units/sales
Sweden (GLF)	4× Platinum	32,000,000^{†}
^{†} Streaming-only figures based on certification alone.
