= Ta mig tillbaka =

Single by Darin

from the album Fjärilar i magen
- Released: 13 March 2015
- Recorded: 2015
- Genre: Pop
- Length: 3:08
- Label: Dex Music
- Songwriter(s): Darin, Ollie Olson, David Lindgren Zacharias

Darin singles chronology
"Mamma Mia" (2014)	"Ta mig tillbaka" (2015)	"Juliet" (2015)

Music video
- "Ta mig tillbaka" on YouTube

"Ta mig tillbaka" ("Take Me Back") is a song by Swedish singer Darin, released in March 2015 as the lead single from his seventh studio album Fjärilar i magen. The song was written by Darin, Ollie Olson and David Lindgren Zacharias and recorded at Atlantis Studio in Stockholm.

== Background and release ==
On 9 March 2015 Darin shared a clip on his Instagram account announcing the release of his first self-written single in Swedish. In the clip, he writes "Ta mig tillbaka" on a sheet of paper, which was later revealed to be the single's title. On 10 March, Darin changed the cover photo of his Facebook page, revealing the release date of "Ta mig tillbaka", being scheduled for 13 March. The single, which tells the memories from Darin's childhood, was released in Sweden, Norway, Finland and Denmark and it was performed at the Norwegian-Swedish talk show Skavlan the same day.

== Music video ==
The music video of the single was released on 4 May on Darin's YouTube channel. It was directed by James Velasquez and filmed in Stockholm on 16, 17 and 24 March. In an interview with Darin Worldwide, Darin said that he "wanted the video to be one with the lyrics and the music, so there's a magical but simple feeling to it, with old clips of me and things from the time when I grew up in the '90s".

== Charts ==
Chart (2015/16)	Peak position
Sweden (Sverigetopplistan)	11

== Certifications ==
Certifications for "Ta mig tillbaka"
Region	Certification	Certified units/sales
Sweden (GLF)	5× Platinum	200,000^{‡}
^{‡} Sales+streaming figures based on certification alone.

== Release history ==
Region	Date	Label	Format
Various	13 March 2015	Dex Music	Digital Download, streaming
