= Viva la Vida =

2008 single by Coldplay

Single by Coldplay

from the album Viva la Vida or Death and All His Friends
- B-side: "Death Will Never Conquer"
- Released: 25 May 2008
- Recorded: 2007–2008
- Genre: Art rock; baroque pop; orchestral pop
- Length: 4:01 (album version); 4:02 (single version); 3:45 (radio edit)
- Label: Parlophone; Capitol
- Songwriters: Guy Berryman; Jonny Buckland; Will Champion; Chris Martin
- Producers: Markus Dravs; Brian Eno; Jon Hopkins; Rik Simpson

Coldplay singles chronology
"Violet Hill" (2008)	"Viva la Vida" (2008)	"Lost!" (2008)

Music video
- "Viva la Vida" on YouTube "Viva la Vida" (Alternative version) on YouTube

"Viva la Vida" (/ˌviːvə lə ˈviːdə/, Spanish: [ˈbiβa la ˈβiða]; Spanish for 'long live life') is a song by the British rock band Coldplay. It was written by all members of the band for their fourth album, Viva la Vida or Death and All His Friends (2008), on which the band explored new styles. The lyrics contain historical and Christian references (King Louis XVI and the French Revolution, "Roman cavalry choirs", Saint Peter) and the track is built around a looping string section with a digitally processed piano, while other layers are gradually added.

The title was taken from Mexican artist Frida Kahlo's final painting in which the words "Viva la Vida" were inscribed on a watermelon. Chris Martin had seen the painting while at the Frida Kahlo museum in Mexico, and thought it was a good title for a song. The song primarily tells the story of a king who has lost his kingdom, and reflects on the social aspects of revolution. The song went through several different styles as the band struggled to settle on its composition. Eventually, a church bell sound effect was added which completed the sound they were searching for. After hearing the bell, Martin remarked: "That's it."

The track was first made available as part of the album pre-order on 7 May 2008, being released individually on 25 May 2008 as the album's second single. Debuting to critical acclaim and commercial success, "Viva la Vida" reached the top spot of the UK Singles Chart and Billboard Hot 100, becoming the band's first number-one single in both the United Kingdom and United States. It won the Grammy Award for Song of the Year at the 51st Annual Grammy Awards in 2009 and has been featured on several critic rankings and listicles. It is one of the most-streamed songs on Spotify with over 3.6 billion plays.

Two music videos were produced for the song. The official version, directed by Hype Williams, depicts the band performing against a blurry, warped version of Eugène Delacroix's Liberty Leading the People. A second, alternate video is a tribute to director Anton Corbijn's video for Depeche Mode's "Enjoy the Silence" (1990) and portrays Martin as the king from whose perspective the song is sung.

Multiple artists claimed that the band had plagiarised parts of their work to produce the song. American band Creaky Boards suggested Coldplay had taken from their song "The Songs I Didn't Write", though this was later retracted. Joe Satriani took the band to court over alleged similarities to his song "If I Could Fly" (2004), but the case was dismissed. Cat Stevens claimed the song was similar to his 1973 song "Foreigner Suite" but also said that he did not think they copied it intentionally.

== Background and writing ==
The song's Spanish title is taken from a painting by 20th-century Mexican artist Frida Kahlo. In what was her final painting, which was finalised a few days before her death, the words "Viva la Vida" are inscribed on a melon wedge at the bottom of the canvas. In Spanish, viva translates to "long live", so "Long Live Life" is an accurate translation for the title. The painting reflects the artistic irony of acclaiming life while suffering physically. When asked about the album's title, referring to Frida Kahlo's strength, enduring polio, a broken spine, and a decade of chronic pain, lead singer Chris Martin said: "She went through a lot of shit, of course, and then she started a big painting in her house that said 'Viva la Vida', I just loved the boldness of it."

In a 2011 interview for Sveriges Television's documentary TV series "Hitlåtens historia" (Swedish for 'history of the hit song'), Martin recalled: "This is how it started—we were in Mexico and we were at the Frida Kahlo museum, and she has a painting called Viva la Vida, and I thought 'Oh that's a cool title—I'd like to use that' and I have a list of titles that I like, and so it was in my head to try and write a song called Viva la Vida." Martin continued: "And then a little big of melody came to me about 2 o'clock in the morning, so I went downstairs to the piano ... and just ... then that chord sequence came out ... then it all just came out in about 10 minutes ... and then the next year was spent trying to record it ... so it was a really, crazy, fast arrival, and then a very long process to finish it."

In another interview, Martin explained he thought of the "I used to rule the world" lyric after he had taken sleeping pills: "I thought, 'God, that sounds like a big hit single to me,' and then the other half of me said, 'Yeah, you should go to bed.' And then the other half replied, 'No, no, go downstairs and work it out.' So I went down to find a guitar and I recorded it, and I'm very glad because it's an important song for us." In a 2016 interview on The Howard Stern Show, Martin explained: "That just came out in, sort of, one go ... There was probably eight other songs that I tried to call Viva la Vida that never made it ... but then the real one came through and that was the one"

== Production and composition ==
"Viva la Vida"
The sample contains the beginning snippet of the song

In the 2011 Sveriges Television documentary, Martin further commented: "The song Viva la Vida perhaps more than any of our songs went through about fifty-five different styles ... it always had the "dun dun dun" thing ... it sounded very heavy rock at one point, then it went completely acoustic." Guitarist Jonny Buckland quipped: "I think I wrote probably about fifteen riffs for that song, and none of them made it." Martin then explained: "We took a long time to work out how to do it, then one day we found that sort of church bell sound in the chorus, and then we finished it. It's really weird how you can have a song that's completely finished in terms of the lyrics and the melody and everything, but you're just missing one noise." Band manager Phil Harvey said: "I remember Chris hearing it and his face lit up and it was probably the happiest I've ever seen him in the recording studio. He just said 'That's it.'"

"Viva la Vida" soars in with a grandiose instrumental arrangement and sweeping lyrics detailing the pain of being deposed from a lofty position. The big sound of the song constantly verges on becoming overblown, but Coldplay knows how to walk the tightrope perfectly. Bells and chimes and orchestral swells are all there on the chorus, but Chris Martin's voice still pierces through like a clarion call. Lyrically, the pain of the protagonist is clear, but the sweep of words about Jerusalem bells, Roman cavalry, and Saint Peter give "Viva la Vida" an air of intelligence rare in today's most popular pop songs.

— Bill Lamb, About.com.

In another interview, Martin recalled: "We did quite a few different versions and went round the houses a bit and eventually settled on those treatments for it." The soundscape of strings was arranged and performed solely by violinist and composer Davide Rossi. In an interview, Berryman noted Rossi's arrangement created a full orchestral feeling and rectified an issue of flat dynamics in the song, without the need for an entire orchestra. In a 2008 review, Geoff Boucher of the Los Angeles Times described the strings as "Beatles-esque" and commented that the song has a "U2-style build", attributed to the producer Brian Eno's previous work with the Bono-led band. Music critic Ann Powers, also of the Los Angeles Times, commented that Eno's presence has Coldplay making their "official leap towards greatness." The song is written in the key of A♭ major. Its main chord progression is D♭_{5}–A♭_{sus4}/E♭–A♭–Fm. The time signature is 4/4 and the tempo is 138 beats per minute.

== Lyrics and meaning ==
=== Louis XVI and French Revolution ===
The lyrics to "Viva la Vida" are narrated by a protagonist who says he "used to rule the world". One interpretation of the song is that it is a retelling of the French Revolution and spoken from the perspective of King Louis XVI before he is executed by guillotine. The former ruler gave one final speech before his execution on 21 January 1793 at 10:22 am:

"My People, I die innocent! Gentlemen, I am innocent of everything of which I am accused. I hope that my blood may cement the good fortune of the French."

The second verse may also be referring to Louis XVI's rise to power after the death of his grandfather Louis XV with the line: "Now the old king is dead, long live the king", which is almost identical to the traditional proclamation.

The parallel to Louis XVI is also reinforced by the lines "And revolutionaries wait / For my head on a silver plate" in the third verse.

When asked about the song, bassist Guy Berryman said: "It's a story about a king who's lost his kingdom, and all the album's artwork is based on the idea of revolutionaries and guerrillas. There's this slightly anti-authoritarian viewpoint that's crept into some of the lyrics and it's some of the pay-off between being surrounded by governments on one side, but also we're human beings with emotions and we're all going to die and the stupidity of what we have to put up with every day. Hence the album title."

In the 2011 Sveriges Television documentary, Martin said "I always had an image of a king in his castle when everyone's banging down the door, feeling like 'OK, maybe I should change the way I do things' so there is an element of being able to change the world but only if you change the way you do things. So it's like someone who's made a lot of mistakes but feels optimistic that they can change it again." Half-jokingly, he added: "But really it's just a love song, because maybe it's a metaphorical about being in a relationship and making a mistake and trying to fix it. Could be. I don't know. Well I do know. Or do I?"

=== Religious imagery ===
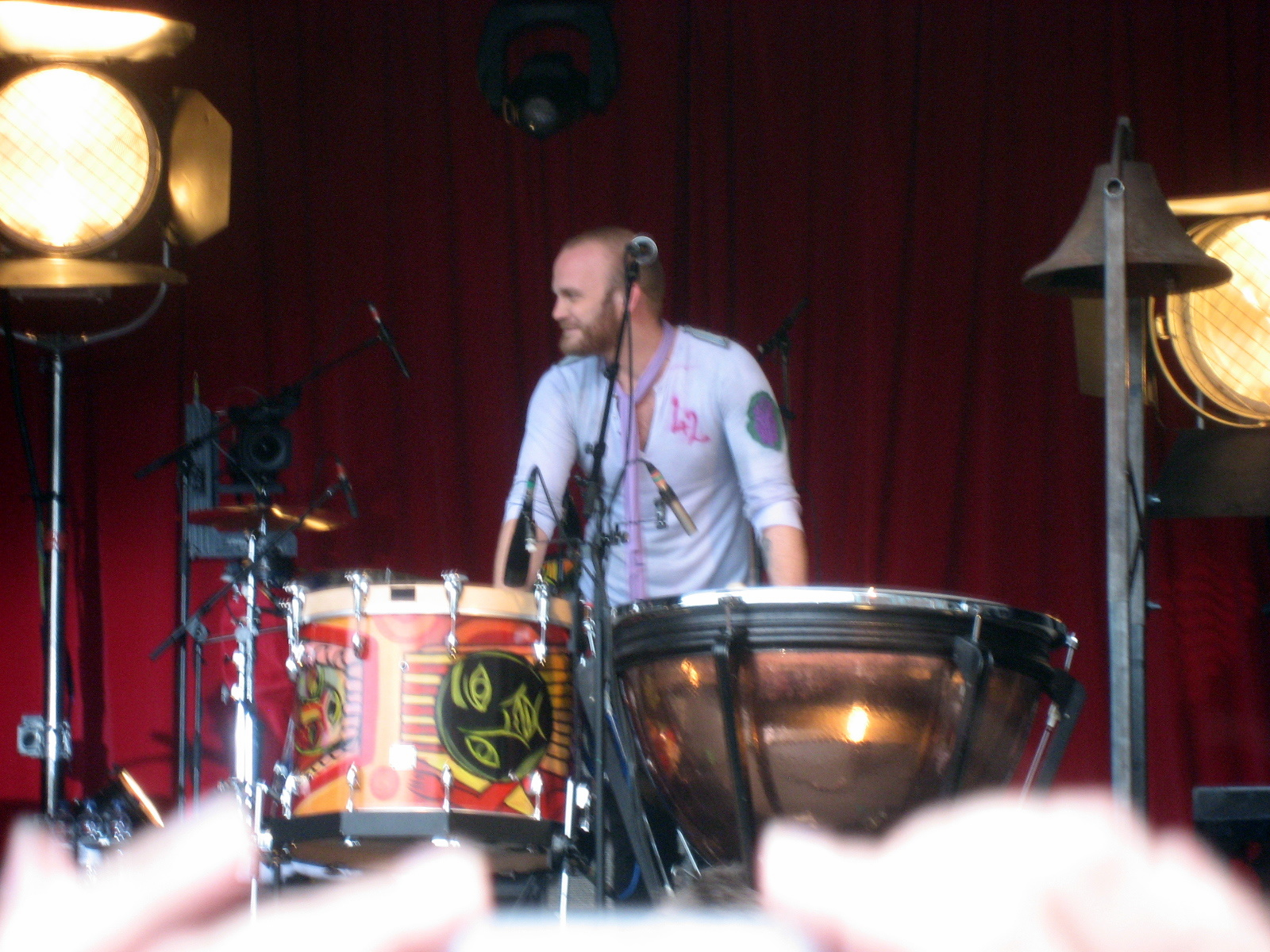
Champion with the timpano and church bell used in the song

The song also heavily features historical and religious imagery in its lyrics – "pillars of salt and pillars of sand", "Jerusalem bells a-ringing", "Roman cavalry choirs", "missionaries", and "Saint Peter". "Pillars of salt" is a reference to Lot's wife who was turned into one when she looked back at Sodom during its destruction by God, while "pillars of sand" is a reference to Matthew 7:24-27 – the parable Jesus tells about the man who built his house on sand.

The lines "And revolutionaries wait / For my head on a silver plate" may also be a reference to John the Baptist, whose head was requested on a silver platter by Herod's stepdaughter Salome.

Religious imagery was also contained in the line "For some reason, I can't explain / I know Saint Peter won't call my name", which Martin himself explained in an interview with Q magazine: "It's about ... You're not on the list" to enter the pearly gates.

== Release and promotion ==
"Viva la Vida" was first made available on the iTunes Store on 7 May 2008. The song was part of the pre-order marketing for Viva la Vida or Death and All His Friends, which also included exclusive acoustic versions for "Lost!" and "Lovers in Japan". On 25 May 2008, Coldplay released it for individual purchase globally. However, since the track was already being given away as a free download to those who had pre-ordered the album, it remained ineligible for the UK Singles Chart until 12 June 2008. Parlophone originally requested the band to not release "Viva la Vida", arguing it "did not sound like Coldplay", but drummer Will Champion insisted on the release.

It became the best-selling song of 2008 on iTunes and was used as part of Apple's iPod + iTunes advertisement campaign. Coldplay first performed "Viva la Vida" live at the MTV Movie Awards.

== Music videos ==
Chris Martin as the king in the Anton Corbijn video

The official music video for "Viva la Vida" was directed by Hype Williams and premiered at Coldplay's official website on 1 August 2008, and was later released on 4 August 2008 on YouTube. The video depicts the band performing against a blurry, warped version of Eugène Delacroix's painting Liberty Leading the People, ending with the band members crumbling into rose petals.

A second, alternate video was shot in The Hague, the Netherlands, directed by Anton Corbijn and released alongside the first. This version is a tribute to Corbijn's video for Depeche Mode's "Enjoy the Silence" and portrays Chris Martin as the king from whose perspective the song is sung. During the video, he carries Delacroix's painting under his arm, while Dave Gahan carries a deck chair under his arm in the "Enjoy the Silence" video. Both are dressed in robes and wearing a crown.

== Critical reception ==
=== Reviews ===
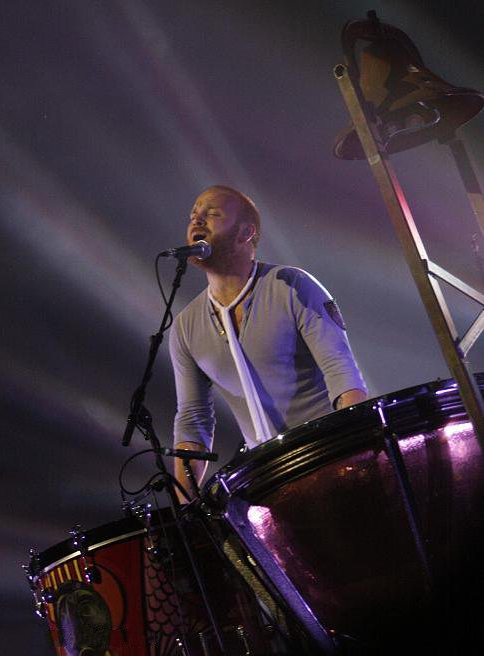
Champion performing "Viva la Vida" during the Viva la Vida Tour in 2009.

"Viva la Vida" received widespread critical acclaim. In the Entertainment Weekly review of the album, critic Chris Willman wrote: "Take the title track... on which [Martin] imagines himself as a paranoid monarch. 'Who would ever want to be king?' Martin asks. 'Revolutionaries wait/For my head on a silver plate!' The confident majesty of the music, however, belies how he and his bandmates have invigorated their rock-lite reign." Josh Hathaway from The Plain Dealer noted "Viva la Vida" as the "catchiest" song on the album. Chris Jones of the BBC noted: "The string/brass mutations that bolster a track like 'Viva la Vida' ... conjure tunes so sweetly melancholy." In the IGN review, critic Chad Grischow wrote, "It is their one and only foray into unabashed orchestral pop, but the punchy strut of the strings and fantastic marching vocals make it far too charming and lively to dislike, and even harder not to love."

"Viva la Vida" was nominated for "Record of the Year", and won "Song of the Year", and "Best Pop Performance by a Duo or a Group" at the 2009 Grammy Awards. This song also won the Ivor Novello Award for "Best Selling British Single". The song was included in Rolling Stone's annual "100 Best Songs" of 2008 at number nine; it was also voted number two on Rolling Stone's Readers' Rock List: Best Songs of 2008. "Viva la Vida" was also listed at number five on Blender's 1001 Downloads: The Top 144 Songs of 2008, as well in the number eight position on Village Voice's Pazz and Jop list. In 2019, Billboard ranked the song number seven on their list of the 50 greatest Coldplay songs. In 2021, American Songwriter placed the song at number one on their own version of the ranking.

=== Rankings ===
List of critic rankings
Publication	Year	Description	Result	Ref.
The Australian	2025	25 Best Songs of the 21st Century	22	
BBC America	2015	100 Greatest British Songs of the 21st Century So Far	33	
Billboard	2023	The 500 Best Pop Songs of All Time	144	
Cleveland	2015	The 50 Greatest Summer Songs Since 2000	44	
Consequence	2017	Every Alternative Rock No. 1 Hit from Worst to Best	18	
Entertainment Weekly	2015	22 Top Stadium-Concert Sing-Along Songs	10	
The Guardian	2012	The Best Number 1 Singles from 1952 to 2012	Placed	
KROQ-FM	2024	Top 500 Songs from the Last 30 Years	136	
MTV Australia	2013	The Official Top 1000 All Time Classics	Placed	
NPO Radio 2	2010	Top 2000	7	
PopMatters	2008	The Best Singles of 2008	26	
Radio X	2010	The Xfm Top 1000 Songs of All Time	Placed	
Radio X	2026	Best of British 500	145	
Rolling Stone	2008	100 Best Singles of 2008	9	
Rolling Stone	2011	100 Best Songs of the 2000s	68	
RTÉ Gold	2023	Top 100 Story Songs	14	
Sveriges Radio	2024	The World's 300 Best Songs	270	
Uproxx	2024	The 100 Best Hit Songs of the Century So Far	21	
WYEP-FM	2020	Greatest Songs of the Past 30 Years	Placed	

== Chart performance ==
Driven by digital sales, "Viva la Vida" became Coldplay's first song to top the Billboard Hot 100 and their second to enter the Top 10, following "Speed of Sound". It was also the first single from a British act to reach number one in the United Kingdom and United States simultaneously since "Maggie May" by Rod Stewart in 1971. The track later peaked at number eight on the Hot 100 Airplay, giving the group their highest-charting release in American radio. "Viva la Vida" topped Billboard's Modern Rock and Hot Adult Top 40 charts as well, becoming the first single in Capitol history to achieve the feat on the latter. Its lyrics were among the most searched on American Google in 2008.

Despite being disqualified from British rankings at first due to album pre-order restrictions on iTunes, the song eventually debuted atop the UK Singles Chart, making it Coldplay's first track to do so. In June 2024, PPL ranked "Viva la Vida" as the band's most played song across radio and television in the United Kingdom, averaging 27 reproductions a day since release. A year later, the track was placed at number 159 on the list of most streamed songs of all time on Apple Music.

In Canada, the single made a "Hot Shot Debut" at number four on the Canadian Hot 100 on 24 May issue, making it Coldplay's highest debut there. It is also one of Coldplay's three highest-charting singles in Australia, reaching number two (both "A Sky Full of Stars" and "Something Just Like This" matched this peak in 2014 and 2017, respectively). In the week starting 27 November 2023, the single once again returned to the same charts, entering at number 28. In New Zealand, the song was less successful, peaking at number 16; however, the song stayed in the top 40 for 27 non-consecutive weeks. In Spain, the single peaked at number two and had strong airplay on the Spanish radio stations.

== Sporting usage ==
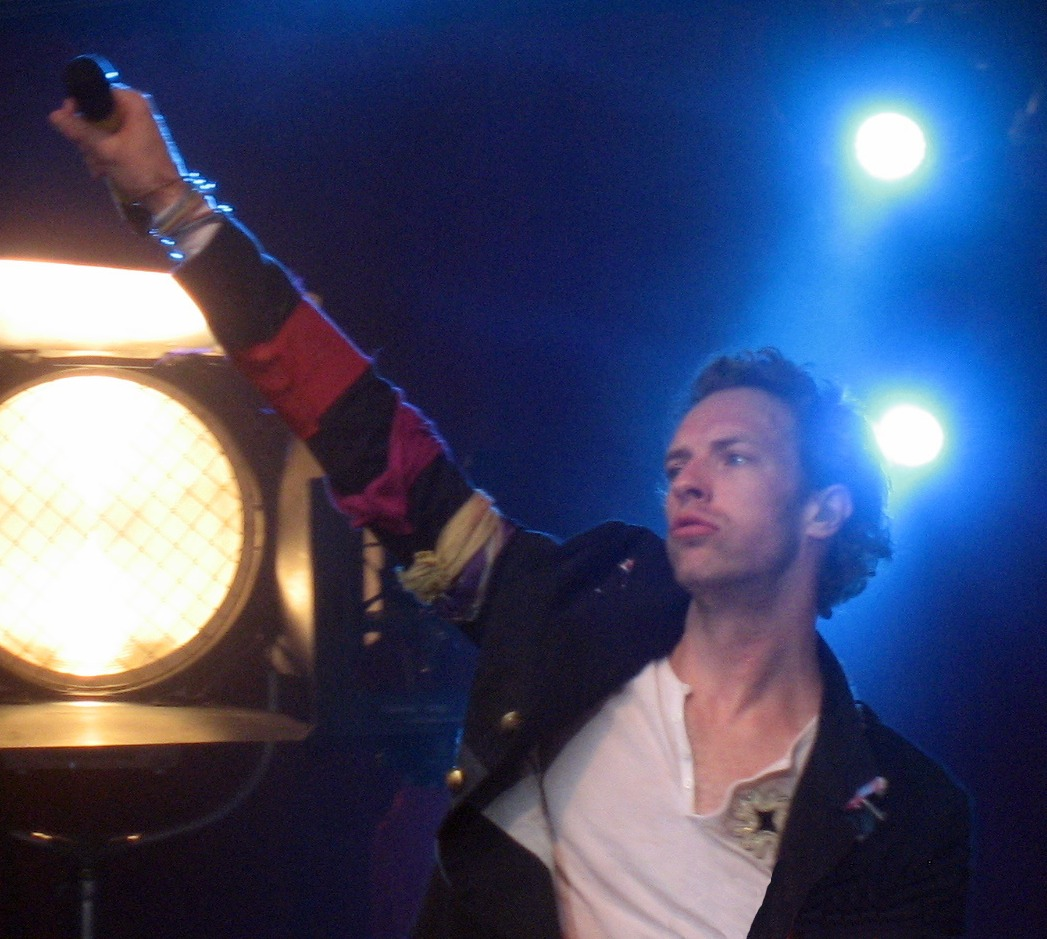
Martin performing "Viva la Vida" during the band's 2008 Viva la Vida Tour

"Viva la Vida" is used as the goal celebration song for the German football club Hannover 96. The song also became the anthem of Spanish football club FC Barcelona starting from the 2008–09 season, who won all six competitions they could possibly be involved in. The song was selected by the manager of the club, Pep Guardiola – himself a Coldplay fan – to help motivate and encourage his team. UEFA used "Viva la Vida" as the goal celebration song for the 2012 UEFA Champions League Final and the 2017–18 UEFA Europa League Final.

The song was also performed by the band during the closing ceremony of the London 2012 Paralympic Games. The song was used to close the event and therefore end the ceremony.

== Plagiarism allegations ==
Coldplay were first accused of plagiarism for the melody of "Viva la Vida" by American band Creaky Boards. Singer Andrew Hoepfner claimed that Martin had heard them playing their piece "The Songs I Didn't Write" at a live show in October 2007. They also published a video comparing sections of both tracks. A spokesperson for Coldplay stated that Martin was working at AIR Studios in London at the time. Additionally, a demo of "Viva la Vida" was recorded in March 2007. Creaky Boards later retracted the accusations and speculated that both songs may have been inspired by the video game The Legend of Zelda.

In December 2008, American guitarist Joe Satriani filed a copyright infringement lawsuit against Coldplay in Los Angeles. It declared that "Viva la Vida" incorporates "substantial, original portions" of his composition "If I Could Fly", from Is There Love in Space? (2004). The band denied the allegation, saying the similarities were entirely coincidental. The case was later dismissed by the California Central District Court, with each party paying their own costs.

In May 2009, British musician Cat Stevens stated that "Viva la Vida" is similar to "Foreigner Suite" (1973), comparing them after talking with his son about it. Stevens informed that any legal action he intended to take depended "on how well Satriani does". In June 2009, he claimed that "They did copy my song but I don't think they did it on purpose [...] I don't want them to think I am angry with them. I'd love to sit down and have a cup of tea with them and let them know it's okay".

In a documentary for Sveriges Television (2011), American music professor Dr. Lawrence Ferrara showed that the melody structures of "Viva la Vida", "If I Could Fly" and "Foreigner Suite" were all similar to the track "Se Tu M'Ami", which has its authorship attributed to Italian composers Alessandro Parisotti and Giovanni Battista Pergolesi. The latter died in 1736. "Obviously this is a work that we would call in the 'public domain'", Ferrara concluded. Discussing the accusations, drummer Champion stated that "We're confident we haven't done anything wrong" and "for some reason, God only knows why, the successful songs seem to be the ones that are accused of being stolen". Martin later revealed that the plagiarism allegations were inspiring to him: "If everyone's trying to take away our best song, then we'd better write 25 better ones".

== Legacy and popular culture ==
"Viva la Vida" has made many media appearances, including being featured throughout the episode "A Person of Interest" from the paranormal drama Medium, as a song played on the radio in the episode "We're Not in Kansas Anymore" from the teen drama 90210, and on the international soundtrack to the Brazilian soap opera A Favorita which helped push the track up the charts in Brazil, where the telenovela had been shown.

It was also used in "Million Dollar Maybe", an episode of The Simpsons. The song was covered in the seventh series of The X Factor by the boyband One Direction in 2010. In 2024, the season 2 finale of Pachinko ends with a cover by Rosé of the Korean pop group Blackpink. It has also been sampled in several other songs, including Flo Rida's "Be on You", and Drake's "Congratulations" from his So Far Gone mixtape.

The song was performed by the band at the One Love Manchester benefit concert, which took place on 4 June 2017 to help support and raise money for the families and friends, who lost loved ones during the Manchester Arena bombing which occurred on 22 May 2017 in Manchester, England, shortly after Ariana Grande concluded her Dangerous Woman Tour show in Manchester.

"Viva la Vida" is featured within the popular dancing video game franchise: Just Dance. The song is included in the main track list of the 2026 Edition of the game.

It is one of the most-streamed songs on Spotify with over 3.1 billion plays.

== Formats and track listings ==
CD Single and Digital Media
No.	Title	Length
1.	"Viva la Vida"	4:02
2.	"Death Will Never Conquer"	1:17

== Credits and personnel ==
Adapted from single credits.

Coldplay

- Chris Martin – piano, keyboards, lead vocals, acoustic guitar
- Guy Berryman – bass guitar, background vocals, synthesizer
- Jonny Buckland – electric guitar
- Will Champion – drums, background vocals, percussion, piano

Additional personnel

- Brian Eno – sound effects
- Davide Rossi – strings
- Francois Chevallier – programming

Production

- Brian Eno – producer
- Jon Hopkins – producer
- Markus Dravs – producer, mixing engineer
- Rik Simpson – producer, mixing engineer

Engineering

- Andrew Rugg – assistant engineer
- Andy Wallace – mixing engineer
- Brian Thorn – assistant engineer
- Daniel Green – assistant engineer
- Michael H. Brauer – mixing engineer
- Rob Ludwig – mastering engineer
- William "Will" Hensley – assistant mixing engineer

Recording

- Michael Trepagnier – recording technician
- Olga Fitzroy – recording technician

== Live versions ==
Live versions have appeared on the 2009 live album LeftRightLeftRightLeft, the 2012 album Live 2012, and the 2018 album Live in Buenos Aires.

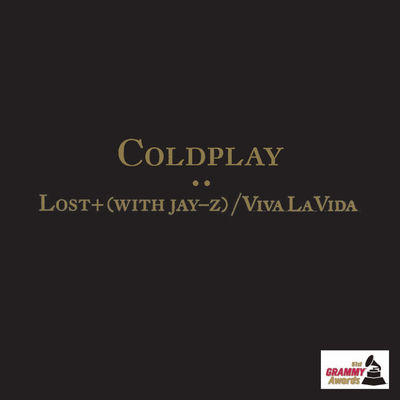
Live version's artwork

The song and "Lost+" were performed live at the 51st Annual Grammy Awards, which took place at the Staples Center in Los Angeles, on 8 February 2009. Coldplay performed a medley of "Lost+" (featuring American rapper Jay-Z) and "Viva la Vida" at the ceremony. The performance was both recorded and released on 8 February 2009.

Track listing

Lost+ (featuring Jay-Z) / Viva la Vida (Live At the 51st Annual Grammy Awards)
No.	Title	Length
1.	"Lost+ (featuring Jay-Z) / Viva la Vida"	5:35
2.	"Lost+ (featuring Jay-Z) / Viva la Vida" (Video)	5:35

== Covers ==
In 2009, Solange Knowles covered "Viva la Vida". Lady Gaga also covered it for BBC Radio 1. Swedish singer Darin's cover of the song reached number 1 on 30 October 2009 on the Swedish Singles Chart and was certified Gold by the GLF in 2010. The song appears on Darin's 2010 album Lovekiller. In 2010, it was yet again included as the B-side of Darin's "You're Out of My Life" single, reaching No. 3 in the Swedish Singles Chart. Coldplay's original single had already charted in Sweden for a total of 49 weeks between 15 May 2008 and 23 October 2009, peaking at number seven. Weezer recorded a cover of the song for the deluxe version of their 2010 album Hurley. In 2012, YouTuber and musician CaptainSparklez released a Minecraft parody of the song called "Fallen Kingdom", which adapts the song's original lyrics to fit a Minecraft narrative of a king losing his kingdom to mobs.

== Charts ==
=== Weekly charts ===
Weekly chart performance in the 2000s
Chart (2008–2009)	Peak position
Australia (ARIA)	2
Austria (Ö3 Austria Top 40)	6
Belgium (Ultratop 50 Flanders)	4
Belgium (Ultratop 50 Wallonia)	7
Canada Hot 100 (Billboard)	4
Czech Republic Airplay (ČNS IFPI)	1
Denmark (Tracklisten)	8
Europe (European Hot 100 Singles)	3
Finland (Suomen virallinen lista)	10
France (SNEP)	7
Germany (GfK)	5
Hungary (Editors' Choice Top 40)	9
Ireland (IRMA)	3
Italy (FIMI)	2
Japan Hot 100 (Billboard)	9
Mexico Anglo Airplay (Monitor Latino)	1
Mexico Ingles Airplay (Billboard)	14
Netherlands (Dutch Top 40)	1
Netherlands (Single Top 100)	4
New Zealand (Recorded Music NZ)	16
Norway (VG-lista)	5
Portugal Digital (Billboard)	2
Spain (Promusicae)	2
Slovakia Airplay (ČNS IFPI)	1
Sweden (Sverigetopplistan)	7
Switzerland (Schweizer Hitparade)	5
UK Singles (Official Charts)	1
US Billboard Hot 100	1
US Adult Alternative Airplay (Billboard)	1
US Adult Contemporary (Billboard)	1
US Adult Pop Airplay (Billboard)	1
US Alternative Airplay (Billboard)	1
US Pop Airplay (Billboard)	12
Venezuela Pop Rock Airplay (Record Report)	4

Weekly chart performance in the 2010s
Chart (2010–2017)	Peak position
South Korea (Gaon)	186
South Korea International (Gaon)	8
UK Singles (Official Charts)	42
US Hot Rock & Alternative Songs (Billboard)	4

Weekly chart performance in the 2020s
Chart (2022–2026)	Peak position
Austria (Ö3 Austria Top 40)	4
Australia (ARIA)	20
Czech Republic Singles Digital (ČNS IFPI)	61
Finland (Suomen virallinen lista)	6
France (SNEP)	82
Global 200 (Billboard)	42
Greece International (IFPI)	8
Hong Kong (Billboard)	12
India International (IMI)	10
Indonesia (Billboard)	22
Israel (Mako Hitlist)	72
Lithuania (AGATA)	80
Lithuania Airplay (TopHit)	3
Luxembourg (Billboard)	24
Malaysia (Billboard)	6
Middle East and North Africa (IFPI)	19
Netherlands (Single Top 100)	21
Norway Airplay (IFPI Norge)	73
Portugal (AFP)	5
Singapore (RIAS)	1
South Korea (Circle)	119
Switzerland (Schweizer Hitparade)	7
Taiwan (Billboard)	22
United Arab Emirates (IFPI)	4
UK Singles (Official Charts)	20

=== Monthly charts ===
Monthly chart performance
Chart (2017–2026)	Peak position
South Korea International (Gaon)	23
Lithuania Airplay (TopHit)	18
Paraguay Airplay (SGP)	43

=== Year-end charts ===
Year-end chart performance
Chart (2008)	Position
Australia (ARIA)	33
Austria (Ö3 Austria Top 40)	33
Belgium (Ultratop 50 Flanders)	16
Belgium (Ultratop 50 Wallonia)	40
Brazil (Crowley)	81
Canada (Canadian Hot 100)	9
Canada Hot AC (Billboard)	9
Croatia International Airplay (HRT)	3
Europe (European Hot 100 Singles)	15
France (SNEP)	43
Germany (Media Control GfK)	26
Ireland (IRMA)	20
Italy (FIMI)	4
Netherlands (Dutch Top 40)	2
Netherlands (Single Top 100)	6
Sweden (Sverigetopplistan)	16
Switzerland (Schweizer Hitparade)	16
Taiwan (Yearly Singles Top 100)	33
UK Singles (OCC)	25
US Billboard Hot 100	13
US Adult Contemporary (Billboard)	18
US Adult Top 40 (Billboard)	8

Chart (2009)	Position
Australia (ARIA)	92
Austria (Ö3 Austria Top 40)	75
Belgium (Ultratop 50 Flanders)	40
Belgium (Ultratop 50 Wallonia)	48
Canada (Canadian Hot 100)	21
Europe (European Hot 100 Singles)	47
Germany (Media Control GfK)	87
Japan Adult Contemporary (Billboard)	8
Netherlands (Single Top 100)	54
Spain (PROMUSICAE)	10
Sweden (Sverigetopplistan)	55
Switzerland (Schweizer Hitparade)	31
UK Singles (OCC)	126
US Billboard Hot 100	55
US Adult Contemporary (Billboard)	5
Venezuela Pop Rock (Record Report)	1

Chart (2011)	Position
UK Singles (OCC)	196

Chart (2016)	Position
US Hot Rock Songs (Billboard)	80

Chart (2017)	Position
South Korea International (Gaon)	89

Chart (2022)	Position
Portugal (AFP)	159

Chart (2023)	Position
Australia (ARIA)	71
France (SNEP)	166
Global 200 (Billboard)	64
Iceland (Tónlistinn)	43
Netherlands (Single Top 100)	43
Norway (VG-lista)	40
Sweden (Sverigetopplistan)	74
Switzerland (Schweizer Hitparade)	74
UK Singles (OCC)	46

Chart (2024)	Position
Australia (ARIA)	71
Austria (Ö3 Austria Top 40)	74
France (SNEP)	111
Global 200 (Billboard)	58
Netherlands (Single Top 100)	75
Portugal (AFP)	113
Switzerland (Schweizer Hitparade)	84
UK Singles (OCC)	58

Chart (2025)	Position
Argentina Anglo Airplay (Monitor Latino)	70
France (SNEP)	160
Global 200 (Billboard)	50
Lithuania Airplay (TopHit)	170
Netherlands (Single Top 100)	73
Switzerland (Schweizer Hitparade)	38
UK Singles (OCC)	54

=== Decade-end charts ===
Decade-end chart performance
Chart (2000–2009)	Position
Australia (ARIA)	71
Austria (Ö3 Austria Top 40)	31
Netherlands (Dutch Top 40)	2
US Billboard Hot 100	49

== Certifications and sales ==
Certifications and sales
Region	Certification	Certified units/sales
Australia (ARIA)	9× Platinum	630,000^{‡}
Belgium (BRMA)	Platinum	30,000 (Note: Belgian certified sales for "Viva la Vida" as of June 2011.)
Brazil (Pro-Música Brasil)	Platinum	60,000^{*}
Denmark (IFPI Danmark)	4× Platinum	360,000^{‡}
Finland (Musiikkituottajat)	Gold	5,875 (Note: Finnish total sales for "Viva la Vida" as of December 2010.)
France	—	149,559 (Note: French decade-end sales for "Viva la Vida" in the 2000s.)
Germany (BVMI)	3× Platinum	900,000^{‡}
Italy	—	30,000 (Note: Italian year-end sales for "Viva la Vida" in 2008.)
Italy (FIMI) Sales since 2009	5× Platinum	500,000^{‡}
Japan (RIAJ)	Gold	100,000^{*}
New Zealand (RMNZ)	8× Platinum	240,000^{‡}
Portugal (AFP)	6× Platinum	60,000^{‡}
South Korea	—	323,270 (Note: South Korean year-end digital sales for "Viva la Vida" in 2017.)
Spain (Promusicae)	8× Platinum	480,000^{‡}
Switzerland (IFPI Switzerland)	Platinum	30,000^{^}
United Kingdom (BPI)	7× Platinum	4,200,000^{‡}
United States (RIAA)	5× Platinum	6,627,629 (Note: American pure sales for "Viva la Vida" as of February 2016.)
Ringtone
Canada (Music Canada)	Gold	20,000^{*}
Japan (RIAJ)	Gold	100,000^{*}
Spain (Promusicae)	Gold	10,000^{*}
Streaming
Denmark (IFPI Danmark)	Gold	900,000^{†}
Greece (IFPI Greece)	Platinum	2,000,000^{†}
Japan (RIAJ)	Gold	50,000,000^{†}
^{*} Sales figures based on certification alone.^{^} Shipments figures based on certification alone.^{‡} Sales+streaming figures based on certification alone.^{†} Streaming-only figures based on certification alone.

== Release history ==
Release dates and formats
Region	Date	Format	Label(s)	Ref.
United States	17 June 2008	Mainstream airplay	Capitol	

== See also ==
- List of best-selling singles
- List of best-selling singles in Italy
- List of best-selling singles in Spain
- List of best-selling singles in the United Kingdom
- List of best-selling singles in the United States
- List of Billboard Hot 100 number ones of 2008
- List of number-one songs of 2008 (Mexico)
- List of number-one singles of 2008 (Netherlands)
- List of number-one songs of 2024 (Singapore)
- List of top 10 singles for 2008 in Australia
- List of top 10 singles in 2008 (Ireland)
- List of number-one songs of the 2000s (Slovakia)
- List of number-one singles of the 2000s (Sweden)
- List of UK singles chart number ones of the 2000s
