= Lovekiller (song) =

Single by Darin

from the album Lovekiller
- Released: 13 July 2010
- Recorded: 2009
- Genre: Pop
- Length: 3:32
- Label: Universal Music Sweden
- Songwriters: Darin, Tony Nilsson
- Producers: Darin, Tony Nilsson

Darin singles chronology
"Can't Stop Love" (2010)	"Lovekiller" (2010)	"Nobody Knows" (2012)

"Lovekiller" is a song by Swedish singer Darin, released in July 2010 as the fourth and final single from his fifth studio album of the same name. The song was written and produced by Darin and Tony Nilsson.

"Lovekiller" debuted and peaked at number 6 on the Swedish singles chart. Darin also recorded an acoustic version of "Lovekiller" as a bonus track for the album. It received positive reviews from music critics for its production, background choir and Darin's vocals.

== Track listing ==
iTunes Single

1. Lovekiller - 3:30

Remixes EP

1. Lovekiller (Redtop Radio Remix) - 3:03
2. Lovekiller (Redtop Club Remix) - 5:43
3. Lovekiller (Steffwell Radio mix) - 3:20
4. Lovekiller (Steffwell Extended Club Remix) - 5:20

== Charts ==
Chart (2010)	Peak position
Sweden (Sverigetopplistan)	6

== Release history ==
Region	Date	Label	Format
Sweden	13 July 2010	Universal Music Sweden	Digital Download; CD
