= What If (Friends song) =

Single by Friends featuring Darin

from the album Flashback
- Released: 5 March 2009
- Recorded: 2008
- Genre: Pop
- Length: 3:30
- Label: Sony Music Sweden
- Songwriter(s): Niclas Molinder, David Jassy, Joacim Persson, Johan Alkenäs.
- Producer(s): Twin

Darin singles chronology
"See U At The Club" (2009)	"What If" (2009)	"Runaway" (2009)

Music video
- "What If" on YouTube

"What If" is a song by Swedish singer Darin featuring Friends. The song was released as the fourth single from Darin's fourth studio album, Flashback as a bonus track. The song is an anti-bullying song, written by David Jassy and produced by the Swedish producers Twin.

== Music video ==
A music video was shot to accompany the song, featuring Darin. It also displayed victims of bullying in various contexts, most notably participating in sports and social activities.

== Charts ==
Chart (2009)	Peak position
Sweden (Sverigetopplistan)	51
