= The Anthem (album) =

Studio album by Darin
- Released: 16 February 2005
- Length: 39:26
- Label: RCA; BMG
- Producer: Arnthor Birgisson; Rikard Branden; Johan Brorson; Jörgen Elofsson; Ghost; RedOne; George Samuelson; Pär Westerlund

Darin chronology
Darin Zanyar (2002)	The Anthem (2005)	Darin (2005)

Singles from The Anthem
- 1. "Money For Nothing" Released: 26 January 2005; 2. "Why Does It Rain" Released: 27 April 2005

The Anthem is the debut studio album from Swedish singer and former Idol contestant Darin. The album was released by RCA Records and BMG on 16 February 2005 in Sweden. It was his first commercial release following the independent release of his previous album Darin Zanyar in 2002. The Anthem features two top 10 singles, including the number one single "Money For Nothing". Also included on the album is the song "Coming True", which was recorded by Darin to be released as a single should he have won the Idol contest, but as he finished in second place, the song was included as a bonus track.

== Background ==
After having finished in second place on Idol in 2004, Darin started recording his first studio album, working with producers such as RedOne, Ghost and Jörgen Elofsson. The album consists of 12 tracks: 10 new tracks, 1 bonus track and 1 reproduced tracks from Darin's debut independent album Darin Zanyar. The track "What You're Made of" was recorded as a demo for Darin's previous studio album and written by Darin himself, it was known as "What Ya Made of." The bonus track on the album, "Coming True," a song written and produced by Jörgen Elofsson, was recorded by Darin and fellow Idol contestant Daniel Lindström and would serve as the single for the eventual winner. Since Lindström won the contest, Darin's version was added as a bonus track.

== Track listing ==
Credits adapted from Spotify.

The Anthem track listing
No.	Title	Writer(s)	Producers(s)	Length
1.	"Give It to Me"	Arnthor Birgisson; Robin Thicke	Birgisson	3:44
2.	"Money for Nothing"	Robin Carlsson; Remee; Johan Ekhé; Ulf Lindström	Ghost	3:07
3.	"I Can See U Girl"	Nadir Khayat; Tori London	RedOne	3:00
4.	"Why Does It Rain"	Anja; Jörgen Elofsson	Elofsson; Ghost	4:00
5.	"Encore, Otra Vez, 1 More Time"	RedOne; Teron Beal; Carl Henry	RedOne	3:27
6.	"The Anthem"	Adam Baptiste; George Samuelson	Samuelson	3:01
7.	"What Is Love"	Darin Zanyar; Niclas Widahl; Pontus Söderqvist; RedOne; Tymes 4	RedOne	2:41
8.	"The Way I Am"	Anders Barrén; Harry Sommerdahl; Ninos Yakoub; Stefan Adel	Ghost	3:35
9.	"One True Flame"	Jörgen Elofsson; Robbie Nevil	Elofsson; Ghost	4:15
10.	"Stand By Me"	Max Martin; Alexandra Talomaa	Johan Brorson	3:11
11.	"What You're Made of"	Darin Zanyar; Andreas Klingberg; Kristjan Dogar	Ghost	3:01

Bonus track
No.	Title	Writer(s)	Producers(s)	Length
12.	"Coming True"	Elofsson	Elofsson; Rikard Branden; Pär Westerlund	3:40
Total length:				39:26

== Charts ==
=== Weekly charts ===
Weekly chart performance for The Anthem
Chart (2005)	Peak position
Swedish Albums (Sverigetopplistan)	1

=== Year-end charts ===
Year-end chart performance for The Anthem
Chart (2005)	Position
Swedish Albums (Sverigetopplistan)	14

== Certifications ==
Certifications for The Anthem
Region	Certification	Certified units/sales
Sweden (GLF)	Gold	30,000^{^}
^{^} Shipments figures based on certification alone.

== Release history ==
Release history for The Anthem
Region	Date	Format	Label	Catalgoue	Ref(s)
Sweden	16 February 2005	CD; digital download	RCA; BMG	82876 67652 2	
