= Money for Nothing (Darin song) =

"Money For Nothing"

Single by Darin

from the album The Anthem
- Released: 26 January 2005
- Recorded: 2004
- Genre: Pop, teen pop
- Length: 3:05
- Label: RCA/BMG
- Songwriter(s): Robin Carlsson, Remee, Johan Ekhé, Ulf Lindström
- Producer(s): Ghost

Darin singles chronology
"Money For Nothing" (2005)	"Why Does It Rain" (2005)

"Money for Nothing" is the debut single released by Swedish singer Darin in 2005. The song is taken from his debut commercial album, The Anthem. The song was written and composed by Robyn, Johan Ekhé, Ulf Lindström and Remee and reached the top of the Swedish Singles Chart, was certified platinum and was awarded a Grammis for song of the year.

== Music video ==
The video features Darin in a large room with various colourful patterns on the walls surrounding him depicting the earth and he is underneath the layers of mud and clay. He is also seen leaning against a stone wall in the video and standing with a girl singing to her in the street. The video was produced by Mikael Gemoll and Bobby. The video for Money For Nothing also appears on the DVD Tour Videos Interview which was released in 2006.

== Track listing ==
1. "Money for Nothing" – 3:05
2. "Money for Nothing" (Instrumental) – 3:05

== Charts ==
=== Weekly charts ===
Chart (2005)	Peak position
Sweden (Sverigetopplistan)	1

=== Year-end charts ===
Chart (2005)	Position
Sweden (Sverigetopplistan)	4

== Certifications ==
Certifications for "Money for Nothing"
Region	Certification	Certified units/sales
Sweden (GLF)	Platinum	20,000^{^}
^{^} Shipments figures based on certification alone.
