= Lovekiller (album) =

Studio album by Darin
- Released: 16 August 2010
- Label: Universal Music
- Producer: Arnthor Birgisson; Johan Bobäck; ChouChou; Darin; Jason Gill; Tomas Granlind; Henrik Janson; Tony Nilsson; George Samuelson

Darin chronology
Flashback (2008)	Lovekiller (2010)	Det Bästa Av (2012)

Singles from Lovekiller
- 1. "Viva la Vida" Released: 8 October 2009; 2. "You're Out of My Life" Released: 28 February 2010; 3. "Can't Stop Love" Released: 19 June 2010; 4. "LoveKiller" Released: 13 July 2010

Lovekiller is the fifth studio album by Swedish singer and songwriter Darin. It was released by Universal Music digitally on 16 August 2010 and physically on 18 August. The record is Darin's first album since parting with Sony Music after four years with the label and it became his fifth top ten album on the Swedish Album chart. The album includes the song "You're Out of My Life", Darin's entry in Melodifestivalen 2010.

== Background ==
In September 2009, Darin signed a new record deal with Universal Music after four years with Sony Music. His first release with Universal was a cover of Coldplay's "Viva la Vida" which Darin performed live at Idol on 8 October 2009 the song was released digitally and peaked at number 1 on the Swedish singles chart.

On 3 November 2009, it was announced that Darin would be participating in Melodifestivalen 2010, with the mid-tempo ballad "You're Out of My Life" written by Tony Nilsson and Henrik Janson. Darin came 4th in the final. The song was released in February 2010 and peaked at number three on the Swedish Single Chart.

On 1 June 2010, Universal Music Sweden announced Darin soon would release his single "Lovekiller" and his fifth studio album, his first with Universal, on 25 August 2010. Darin began a 17-date Sommarturné (Summer Tour) in Sweden on 4 June 2010, starting in Karlshamn, during which he performed songs from the new album.

In June 2010, Darin was asked by Swedish broadcaster SVT to record a written song, "Can't Stop Love", for the Royal Wedding of Princess Victoria and Daniel Westling. Darin performed the song on a rooftop in Stockholm during the live broadcast of the wedding on SVT. The song was released digitally on the day of the wedding, 19 June 2010.

On 13 July 2010, a press release was published by Universal Music Sweden revealing the name, track listing and cover art for the new album and also that the album would be released earlier than originally planned on 18 August. Also mentioned in the press release are the producers of the album, Tony Nilsson, Arnthor Birgisson, Henrik Jansson and Darin.

== Singles ==
1. "Viva la Vida", a cover of the Coldplay song, which was performed live on Idol in October 2009 was released as the lead single and peaked at number 1.
2. "You're Out of My Life" was first heard publicly in full on 20 February 2010 when it was performed live in Heat 3 of Melodifestivalen 2010. It was released physically on 28 February and peaked at number 3.
3. "Can't Stop Love" is a single written by Darin and Tony Nilsson especially for the Royal Wedding of Princess Victoria and Daniel Westling. It was performed in Stockholm during SVT's live broadcast of the wedding on 19 June 2010 and released the same day digitally peaking at 13 in the singles chart.
4. "Lovekiller", the album's title track, was first heard performed live during Darin's Summer tour of Sweden with the studio version premiering on 13 July 2010, which was also the day of its digital release. The single debuted and peaked at number 6.

== Track listing ==
Lovekiller track listing
No.	Title	Writer(s)	Producers(s)	Length
1.	"Microphone"	Darin Zanyar; Tony Nilsson	Nilsson; Darin	3:30
2.	"You're Out of My Life"	Nilsson; Henrik Janson	Arnthor Birgisson	3:02
3.	"Lovekiller"	Zanyar; Nilsson	Nilsson; Darin	3:32
4.	"Only You Can Save Me"	Zanyar; Nilsson	Jason Gill	3:41
5.	"Drowning"	Zanyar; Nilsson; Janson	Nilsson	3:02
6.	"Viva La Vida"	Guy Berryman; Jon Buckland; Will Champion; Chris Martin	Johan Bobäck	4:36
7.	"Endless Summer"	Zanyar; George Samuelson; Tomas Granlind	Samuelson; Granlind; ChouChou	4:14
8.	"OK (Dangerous Game)"	Zanyar; Nilsson; Janson	Nilsson; Darin	3:15
9.	"Can't Stop Love"	Zanyar; Nilsson	Nilsson; Darin	3:41
10.	"I'll Be Alright"	Zanyar	Janson; Nilsson	3:03

iTunes bonus track
No.	Title	Writer(s)	Producers(s)	Length
11.	"Lovekiller" (acoustic version)	Zanyar; Nilsson	Nilsson; Darin	3:30

== Personnel ==
- Hoffe Stannow – mastering (except tracks 2, 6) at Cosmos Mastering
- Erik Broheden – mastering (tracks 2, 6) at Masters of Audio
- Niklas Rune – A&R
- Micke Hagerman – management (Love No Limit)
- Pysse Holmberg – photography
- Jonas Kjellberg – artwork (Zion Graphics)

== Charts ==
=== Weekly charts ===
Weekly chart performance for Lovekiller
Chart (2010)	Peak position
Swedish Albums (Sverigetopplistan)	1

=== Year-end charts ===
Year-end chart performance for Lovekiller
Chart (2010)	Position
Swedish Albums (Sverigetopplistan)	45

== Certifications ==
Certifications for Lovekiller
Region	Certification	Certified units/sales
Sweden (GLF)	Gold	20,000^{‡}
^{‡} Sales+streaming figures based on certification alone.

== Release history ==
Release history for Lovekiller
Region	Date	Label	Format	Catalgoue	Ref(s)
Sweden	16 August 2010	Universal Music Sweden	Digital download	060252745612	
Sweden	18 August 2010	Universal Music Sweden	CD	060252745612	
Poland	2 January 2012	Sony Music Poland	CD	88697867072	
