= Nobody Knows (Darin song) =

Single by Darin

from the album Exit
- Released: 10 February 2012
- Recorded: 2011
- Genre: Electropop; EDM; dance-pop
- Length: 3:38
- Label: Universal Music Sweden
- Songwriters: Darin, Tony Nilsson, Niklas Rune, Bilal Hajji
- Producer: Tony Nilsson

Darin singles chronology
"Lovekiller" (2010)	"Nobody Knows" (2012)	"Playing With Fire" (2013)

"Nobody Knows" is a song by Swedish singer, Darin, released in February 2012 as the lead single from his's sixth studio album Exit. The song was written by Darin, Tony Nilsson, Niklas Rune and Bilal Hajji and produced by Nilsson.

Despite not having entered the Swedish Singles Chart, the single has sold over 40,000 copies in Sweden, being certified platinum in August 2012.

On 14 May 2013 the single was released throughout all Europe under the label Dex Music. On 16 May Darin performed the two songs in a medley at the Eurovision Song Contest 2013 in Malmö, Sweden, as part of the interval act of the second semifinal.

== Charts ==
Following his performance of the song on Allsång på Skansen, the song topped the Swedish Digital Singles Chart.

Chart (2012)	Peak position
Swedish Digital Singles Chart (DigiListan)	1

== Certifications ==
Certifications for "Nobody Knows"
Region	Certification	Certified units/sales
Sweden (GLF)	Platinum	40,000^{‡}
^{‡} Sales+streaming figures based on certification alone.

== Release history ==
Region	Date	Label	Format
Sweden	10 February 2012	Universal Music Sweden	Digital Download
Finland	11 June 2012	Warner Music Finland	Digital Download
Europe	14 May 2013	Dex Music - X5 Music Group	Digital Download
Australia	15 June 2015	Sony Music Australia	Digital Download
