= Step Up (Darin song) =

Single by Darin

from the album Darin
- Released: 7 September 2005
- Recorded: 2005
- Genre: Pop, R&B, Dance
- Length: 3:07
- Label: Columbia/Sony BMG
- Songwriter(s): RedOne, Darin, Bilal Hajji
- Producer(s): RedOne

Darin singles chronology
"Why Does It Rain" (2005)	"Step Up" (2005)	"Who's That Girl" (2005)

"Step Up" is a song by Swedish singer Darin, released in September 2005 as the lead single from his second album, Darin. The song was co-written by Darin with RedOne and Bilal Hajji and debuted at number one.

== Music video ==
The video has a very R&B theme to it featuring Darin singing through a broken window in front of green strobe lights similar to that of Yeah! by U.S. singer Usher. Darin is seen with his dancers performing in front of a wall of graffiti in a basement style setting where there also is a crowded party, with Darin being seen dancing in the crowd. In the video there is a wall with a picture of Darin painted on it, in front of which he is seen singing. The video is produced and directed by Mikedalica and Harakiri, and is featured on the DVD Tour Videos Interview.

== Track listing ==
1. "Step Up" -3:07
2. "Step Up" (Instrumental) -3:07

== Charts ==
=== Weekly charts ===
Chart (2005)	Peak position
Sweden (Sverigetopplistan)	1
Finland (Suomen virallinen lista)	9

=== Year-end charts ===
Chart (2005)	Position
Sweden (Sverigetopplistan)	10

== Certifications ==
Certifications for "Step Up"
Region	Certification	Certified units/sales
Sweden (GLF)	Gold	10,000^{^}
^{^} Shipments figures based on certification alone.

== Notes ==
"Step Up" was heard playing in a club in episode 5 of the third series of UK comedy Benidorm on 30 October 2009. There is also an unofficial remix of the song mixed with the song Just a Lil Bit by rapper 50 Cent. The song has furthermore been covered by German boy band US5, retitled "In The Club" (2006). Though the melody is very similar the lyrics have been re-written.
