= Flashback (Darin album) =

Studio album by Darin
- Released: 3 December 2008
- Genre: Electropop
- Length: 44:24
- Label: Epic; Sony
- Producer: Alke; Johan "Kermit" Bobäck; Darin; Jason Gill; Stefan Gräslund; Knockdown; RedOne; Magnus "Mango" Wallbert

Darin chronology
Break the News (2006)	Flashback (2008)	Lovekiller (2010)

Singles from Flashback
- 1. "Breathing Your Love" Released: 10 October 2008; 2. "See U at the Club" Released: 15 January 2009; 3. "Runaway" Released: March 2009; 4. "What If" Released: March 2009; 5. "Karma" Released: 2009

Flashback is the fourth studio album by Swedish singer Darin. It was released on 3 December 2008 in Sweden and became Darin's fourth top 10 album.

== Background ==
In mid-2007, Darin went into the studio to start work on his 4th studio album with producers such as Johan Bobäck and RedOne. Darin enlisted the help of American singer Kat DeLuna for the lead single "Breathing Your Love" which was produced by RedOne. The single was released in October 2008 and charted at number 2 on the Swedish singles chart.

== Track listing ==
Flashback track listing
No.	Title	Writer(s)	Producers(s)	Length
1.	"Breathing Your Love" (featuring Kat Deluna)	Darin Zanyar; Bilal Hajji; Alonzo "Novel" Stevenson; Nadir Khayat	RedOne; Novel^{[a]}	3:53
2.	"Seasons Fly"	Zanyar; Linda Sundblad; Johan "Kermit" Bobäck	Darin; Kermit	3:02
3.	"Road Trip"	Zanyar; Ilya Salmanzadeh; David Jassy	Knockdown	4:45
4.	"Dance"	Zanyar; Hajji; Stevenson; Khayat	RedOne; Novel^{[a]}	3:33
5.	"Karma" (featuring David Jassy)	Salmanzadeh; Jassy	Knockdown	3:57
6.	"Flashback"	Zanyar; Stefan Gräslund; Jassy; Magnus "Mango" Wallbert	Mango; Gräslund	3:56
7.	"Strobelight"	Zanyar; Gräslund; Jassy; Wallbert	Mango; Gräslund	3:48
8.	"Girl Next Door"	Zanyar; Hajji; Stevenson; Khayat	RedOne; Novel^{[a]}	3:11
9.	"Runaway"	Zanyar; Gräslund; Jassy; Wallbert	Mango; Gräslund	3:02
10.	"Paradise"	Zanyar; Curtis Richardson; Jason Gill; Sammy Gill	J. Gill; S. Gill^{[b]}	3:59
11.	"See U at the Club"	Zanyar; Hajji; Stevenson; Khayat	RedOne; Novel^{[a]}	3:43

Bonus track
No.	Title	Writer(s)	Producers(s)	Length
12.	"What If"	Niclas Molinder; Joacim Persson; Johan Alkenäs; Jassy	Alke	3:34

Bonus edition – bonus tracks
No.	Title	Writer(s)	Producers(s)	Length
13.	"Brought Me Back"	Zanyar; Hajji; Stevenson; Khayat	RedOne; Novel^{[a]}	3:30
14.	"Insanity" (The Attic Remix radio edit)	Zanyar; Peter Mansson; Patric Sarin	Mansson; Sarin^{[b]}; The Attic^{[c]}	3:41
15.	"Breathing Your Love" (live at Morgonpasset)	Zanyar; Hajji; Stevenson; Khayat		3:26

Notes

- ^{^[a]} signifies co-producer(s)
- ^{^[b]} signifies additional producer(s)
- ^{^[c]} signifies remix producer(s)

== Charts ==
Weekly chart performance for Flashback
Chart (2008)	Peak position
Swedish Albums (Sverigetopplistan)	10

== Release history ==
Release history for Flashback
Region	Date	Format	Label	Catalgoue
Sweden	3 December 2008	CD; digital download	Epic; Sony	88697415982
