= Breathing Your Love =

Single by Darin featuring Kat DeLuna

from the album Flashback
- Released: 8 October 2008
- Recorded: 2008
- Genre: Dance-pop
- Length: 3:52
- Label: Sony Music
- Songwriter(s): RedOne, Darin, Bilal Hajji, Novel
- Producer(s): RedOne/Novel

Darin singles chronology
"Desire" (2007)	"Breathing Your Love" (2008)	"See U At The Club" (2009)

Kat DeLuna singles chronology
"Run the Show" (2008)	"Breathing Your Love" (2009)	"In the End" (2008)

"Breathing Your Love" is a song by the Swedish singer Darin featuring vocals by American singer Kat DeLuna and the first single from Darin's fourth studio album, Flashback. The song is co-written by Darin with RedOne, Bilal Hajji and Novel was released to radio stations and as a digital download in Sweden on 8 October 2008. The single was released in Finland and is also the first single from Darin to be released in the United Kingdom, which it was in January 2010. In October 2009 Swedish astronaut Christer Fuglesang took 2 copies of the single into space with him, as his daughter is a Darin fan. A photo of the disc can be seen with earth in the distance on the official Darin website.

== Chart performance ==
The single was released as a digital download and to Swedish radio on 8 October and entered the chart the same week on place 5. The next week it climbed to its peak position, 2, where it stayed for 2 weeks. "Breathing Your Love" was also released as a physical single in Sweden, selling in excess of 10,000 copies which resulted in a Gold certification.

In October 2009 it was announced that "Breathing Your Love" would be released in the UK on Upside Records under licence from Sony Music UK. The single was originally to be released in late November 2009 but due to lack of promotion and Darin's entrance into the 2010 Melodifestivalen contest it will now be released on 24 January 2010. Little or no promotion has occurred in the UK to push the single, which is the reason why it has failed to chart.

== Music video ==
The official video stars both Darin and Kat DeLuna. The video shows Darin waking up with a note at the side of his bed saying "See U there .. K" then through the video Darin appears outside a building covered with graffiti. Darin and DeLuna can furthermore be seen dancing and singing in front of colourful lights and the video ends with the pair meeting in a cafe.

== Live performances ==
"Breathing Your Love" was Darin's first single in almost 2 years and marked a new dance sound for Darin. Darin did most of the single promotion on his own, performing the song live on various occasions, changing the lyrics "was just an empty soul..." to "was just half a man..." "...Until you stepped into my show", he did however record an exclusive acoustic performance with Kat for the Swedish website unt.tv.

== Track listing ==
Digital Download:

1. "Breathing Your Love" ft. Kat DeLuna 3.52

Physical CD (Sweden Only):

1. "Breathing Your Love" ft. Kat DeLuna 3.52

UK Download:

1. "Single Edit" 3.35
2. "Almighty Radio Mix" 4.02
3. "The Thin Red Men Radio Mix" 3.54
4. "Almighty 12" Mix" 8.22
5. "The Thin Red Men Club Mix" 6.16

=== Other versions ===
There are 3 other versions of the song. An acoustic version which is available on the bonus track iTunes edition of the album "Flashback" which features vocals from Darin only and 2 remix versions, a Summer Remix and a Club Remix both of which appear on a promo CD for the single.

== Charts ==
Chart (2008)	Peak position
Sweden (Sverigetopplistan)	2
Finland (Suomen virallinen lista)	13

== Certifications ==
Certifications for "Breathing Your Love"
Region	Certification	Certified units/sales
Sweden (GLF)	Gold	10,000^{^}
^{^} Shipments figures based on certification alone.

== Release history ==
Region	Date	Format	Label
Sweden	8 October 2008	Digital download	Epic Records/Sony Music
Sweden	15 October 2008	CD-single	Epic Records/Sony Music
Finland	25 March 2009	Digital Download	Sony Music
United Kingdom	24 January 2010	Digital download	Upside Records/Sony Music
