= Want Ya! =

Single by Darin

from the album Darin
- Released: 21 January 2006
- Recorded: 2005
- Genre: Pop, dance-pop
- Length: 3:19
- Label: Columbia/Sony BMG
- Songwriter(s): George Samuelson, Thomas Granlind, Darin
- Producer(s): George Samuelson, Thomas Granlind

Darin singles chronology
"Who's That Girl" (2005)	"Want Ya!" (2006)	"Perfect" (2006)

"Want Ya!" is a song by Swedish singer Darin. The single was released both physically and digitally on 21 January 2006 as the third and final single from Darin's second studio album, Darin.

== Music video ==
The video for "Want Ya" stars the same actress who featured in the video for previous single Who's That Girl, Darin is seen talking to her as the video starts. There are several scenes in the video that are set in a locker room and a parking lot in which Darin is seen running with a gang. Throughout the video Darin can be seen singing whilst stood before a big wheel with the lyrics to the song written in Graffiti around it. In the middle of the video there is a "dance-off" between Darin and his gang and another group which continues until the end of the video. The video is produced and directed by Mikedalica and Harakiri and is featured on the DVD Tour Videos Interview.

== Track listing ==
CD Single: Columbia 82876 78790 2 (Sony BMG) / EAN 0828767879024

1. "Want Ya!" 03:52 (George Samuelson, Thomas Granlind, Darin)
2. "Who's That Girl" (The Attic Remix Radio Edit) 03:52 (Jörgen Elofsson)

== Charts ==
Chart (2006)	Peak position
Sweden (Sverigetopplistan)	4
Finland (Suomen virallinen lista)	8
