= Darin (album) =

Studio album by Darin
- Released: 28 September 2005
- Length: 34:21
- Labels: Columbia; Sony BMG
- Producers: Rikard Branden; Jörgen Elofsson; Ghost; Tomas Granlind; Richie Jones; RedOne; George Samuelson; Pär Westerlund

Darin chronology
The Anthem (2005)	Darin (2005)	Break the News (2006)

Singles from Darin
- 1. "Step Up" Released: 7 September 2005; 2. "Who's That Girl" Released: 23 November 2005; 3. "Want Ya!" Released: 25 January 2006

Darin is the second studio album by Swedish singer Darin. It was released by Columbia Records on September 28, 2005 in Sweden and features the singles "Step Up", "Want Ya!" and "Who's That Girl?". The album became Darin's second number-one album in Sweden, with the first being The Anthem (2005).

== Promotion ==
- "Step Up" was released as the album's first single on September 7, 2005, the song peaked at number one on the Swedish singles charts In 2012, the single was number 97 on the list of 100 best selling singles in Sweden. The song also charted in Finland.
- "Who's That Girl" was released as the second single on 23 November 2005. The song entered the charts at number 17 before peaking at number 6 the week after.
- "Want Ya!" was released as the third single on 25 January 2006. The single peaked at number 4 after debuting at number 19 and spent a total of 16 weeks on the charts, the single also peaked at number 8 on the Finnish single charts.

== Chart performance ==
Darin was released on 28 September 2005 and debuted at number one on the Swedish Albums Chart. It has since been certified platinum by the Swedish Recording Industry Association (GLF). The album was also released in Finland where it peaked at number 13 on the Finnish Albums Chart.

== Cover versions ==
The song "Sail the Ocean" has been covered in Italian by band Studio 3 for their third studio album Lentamente and is called "Quando Sarai Sola". Despite the song being a cover version released in 2007, the original songwriters are not credited on the band's official website.

== Track listing ==
Credits adapted from Spotify.

Darin track listing
No.	Title	Writer(s)	Producers(s)	Length
1.	"Intro"	Nadir Khayat	RedOne	0:37
2.	"Move"	Hajii Bilal; Khayat; Darin Zanyar	RedOne	3:44
3.	"Step Up"	Bilal; Khayat; Zanyar	RedOne	3:07
4.	"Who's That Girl"	Jörgen Elofsson	Elofsson; Rikard Branden; Pär Westerlund	3:26
5.	"Doin Dirt"	George Samuelson; Damon Sharpe; Alex Cantrell	Samuelson; Richie Jones	3:12
6.	"Laura"	Bilal; Khayat; Zanyar	RedOne	2:53
7.	"Walk the Distance"	Terry Cox; Tommy Ekman; Elofsson	Ghost	3:14
8.	"Be What You Wanna Be"	Bilal; Khayat; Zanyar	RedOne	3:30
9.	"Want Ya!"	Samuelson; Tomas Granlind	Samuelson; Granlind	3:19
10.	"You Don't Hear Me"	Bilal; Khayat; Zanyar	RedOne	4:16
11.	"Sail the Ocean"	Hortlund; Kinnda; Sommerdahl	Ghost	4:23
Total length:				34:21

== Charts ==
=== Weekly charts ===
Weekly chart performance for Darin
Chart (2005–06)	Peak position
Swedish Albums (Sverigetopplistan)	1
Finnish Albums (Suomen virallinen lista)	13

=== Year-end charts ===
Year-end chart performance for Darin
Chart (2005)	Position
Swedish Albums (Sverigetopplistan)	16

== Certifications ==
Certifications for Darin
Region	Certification	Certified units/sales
Sweden (GLF)	Platinum	60,000^{^}
^{^} Shipments figures based on certification alone.

== Release history ==
Release history for Darin
Region	Date	Format	Label	Catalgoue
Sweden	28 September 2005	CD; digital download	Columbia	828767365428
Finland	18 January 2006	CD; digital download	Columbia	828767365428
