= Exit (Darin album) =

Studio album by Darin
- Released: 30 January 2013
- Genre: Electropop; dance-pop; EDM; electronic; electroclash; europop; eurodance; pop; dance
- Length: 36:53
- Label: Universal
- Producer: Jim Beanz; Lorenzo Cosi; DEEKAY; David Gamson; Justin Hind; Victoria Horn; The Jackie Boyz; Luke Madden; Tony Nilsson; RedOne; Sacha Skarbek; Darin Zanyar

Darin chronology
Lovekiller (2010)	Exit (2013)	Fjärilar i magen (2015)

Singles from Exit
- 1. "Nobody Knows" Released: 10 February 2012; 2. "Playing With Fire" Released: 18 January 2013; 3. "Check You Out" Released: 2 May 2013

Exit is the sixth studio album by Swedish singer Darin. It was released by Universal Music Sweden on 30 January 2013. The debuted at number one on the Swedish album Chart. Exit was certified Gold by Swedish Recording Industry Association (GLF) in its second week of release. The album includes the platinum-selling hit "Nobody Knows."

== Background ==
On 10 February 2012 Darin released the album's first single "Nobody Knows". The project was to release two EPs containing 4-5 tracks each, the first one in April and the second one in August. The release date for the first EP was initially 4 April 2012. However, for unknown reasons, it was pushed back to 14 April. In the meanwhile, Darin made some public appearances, performing his latest single and two more new songs, "All Gone" and "Right To This Point". The album release was one more time delayed and eventually, on 11 June, Darin's team announced on his Facebook page that he would no longer release two EPs and that a new album was set to be released in early 2013. Darin stated several times that the reason why he trashed the whole project was that he was not satisfied with the sound. According to him, the songs on the first EP were very good but he "couldn't let go something that was not 110 percent good."

In October 2012, Darin went on a songwriting tour to USA, where he worked with worldwide famous producers as Jim Beanz, The Jackie Boyz, Victoria Horn and the RedOne Team. They wrote 25 songs, 10 of which made it to the final track list. On 16 November, during an interview for the Swedish NRJ Radio channel, Darin stated that the album would be released at the end of January 2013 and it is a mixture of pop, R&B and club music. The following month, he also revealed the album title in an interview, Exit.

On 21 December 2012, Darin announced on his Facebook page that the album will be released on 30 January 2013 and posted the album artwork and track listing. The album was released in a Limited Edition, including all six of Darin's songs from the Swedish TV-show Så mycket bättre, which he participated in from October to December 2012.

== Singles ==
1. "Nobody Knows" was released digitally on 10 February 2012 as the lead single from the album. It reached number one on iTunes the same day and was subsequently certified platinum on 28 November 2012.
2. "Playing With Fire" was announced as second single from the album as Darin posted its cover art on Twitter and Facebook as a profile picture. It was released on 18 January 2013 in Sweden, Norway and Finland. The single debuted and peaked at number 28 on the Swedish singles chart.
3. "Check You Out" was announced as the third single from the album on April, during a radio interview. On 22 April 2013, Darin posted on the single's cover art on his Instagram account which was released along with a remix of the song by John De Sohn on 2 May.

== Track listing ==
Exit track listing
No.	Title	Writer(s)	Producer(s)	Length
1.	"Playing with Fire"	Darin Zanyar; J. Nick; Jim Beanz	Beanz; Nick^{[a]}	3:25
2.	"Before I Pass Out" (featuring Lil Jon)	Zanyar; Nick; Beanz; Jonathan Smith	Beanz	3:34
3.	"Surrender"	Zanyar; Adam Baptiste; Sacha Skarbek; Lorenzo Cosi	Skarbek; Cosi	3:23
4.	"What It's Like"	Zanyar; Beanz	Beanz; Justin Hind	4:29
5.	"F Your Love"	Zanyar; Nick; Beanz	Beanz; Nick^{[a]}	3:59
6.	"Check You Out"	Zanyar; David Gamson; Joseph Angel	Gamson	3:21
7.	"Give Me Tonight"	Zanyar; Lars Halvor Jensen; Tim McEwan	Deekay; Data^{[b]}; Nova^{[b]}	3:33
8.	"Same Old Song"	Zanyar; Beanz	Beanz	4:11
9.	"That Love"	Zanyar; Battey; Luke Madden; Victoria Horn	Luke Madden; Niklas Bergwall^{[a]}	3:17
10.	"Nobody Knows"	Zanyar; Tony Nilsson; Niklas Rune; Bilal Hajji	Tony Nilsson	3:36

Tolkningarna – limited edition bonus CD
No.	Title	Writer(s)	Producer(s)	Length
1.	"En Apa Som Liknar Dig"	Olle Ljungström; Heinz Liljedahl	Bergwall	3:45
2.	"I Can't Get You Off My Mind"	Linda Karlsson; Sonny Gustavsson	Stefan Olsson	3:12
3.	"Stockholm"	Pugh Rogefeldt	Bergwall	2:43
4.	"Seven Days a Week"	The Sounds	Ohlsson; Carl Wikström Ask; Bergwall	3:37
5.	"Astrologen"	Magnus Uggla	Ohlsson; Wikström Ask; Bergwall	3:11
6.	"Magdalena" (Livet Före Döden)	Kristian Anttila	Olsson	3:32

Notes

- ^{^[a]} signifies additional producer(s)
- ^{^[b]} signifies vocal producer(s)

== Charts ==
=== Weekly charts ===
Weekly chart performance for Exit
Chart (2013)	Peak position
Swedish Albums (Sverigetopplistan)	1

=== Year-end charts ===
Year-end chart performance for Exit
Chart (2013)	Position
Swedish Albums (Sverigetopplistan)	29

== Certifications ==
Certifications for Exit
Region	Certification	Certified units/sales
Sweden (GLF)	Gold	20,000^{‡}
^{‡} Sales+streaming figures based on certification alone.

== Release history ==
Release history for Exit
Region	Date	Label	Format	Catalgoue
Sweden	30 January 2013	Universal Music Sweden	CD; digital download	060253728170
Finland	30 January 2013	Warner Music Finland	CD; digital download	5053105653522
Asia	2015	Dex Music; Sony Music	CD; digital download	88875158762
