= Darin (singer) =

Swedish singer and songwriter

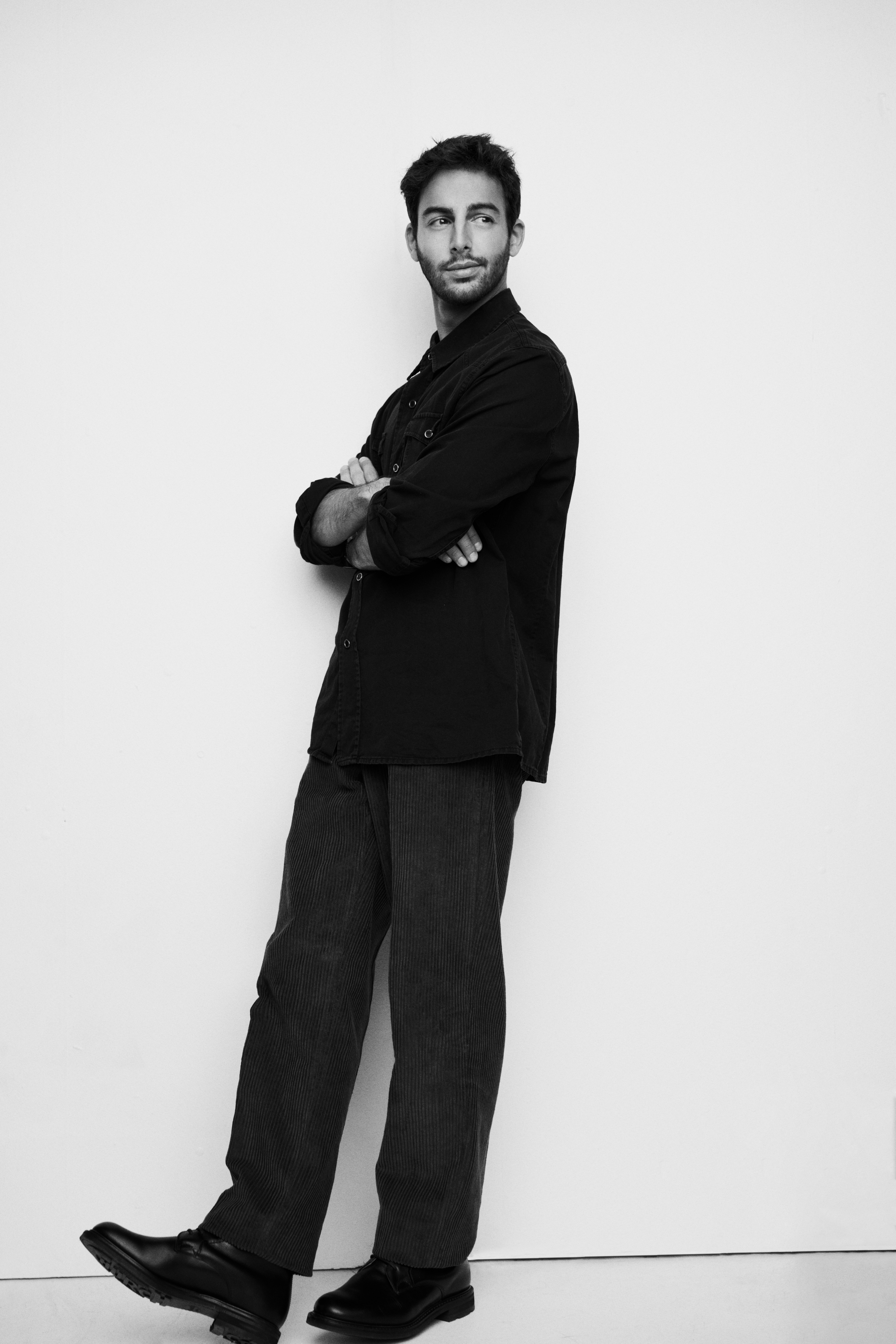
- Darin in 2020

Background information
- Born: Darin Zanyar; 2 June 1987 (age 39); Stockholm, Sweden
- Genres: Pop; dance
- Occupations: Singer; songwriter
- Years active: 2004–present
- Labels: Dex Music; Sony Music; EMI; Universal Music
- Website: darinofficial.com

Darin Zanyar (born 2 June 1987), known mononymously as Darin, is a Swedish singer-songwriter. He first gained prominence after participating in the first season of Swedish Idol. Darin has released ten studio albums, eight of which have reached number one on the Swedish albums chart, making him one of Sweden's most successful recording artists.

== Life and career ==
=== Early life ===
Darin was born in Stockholm to Kurdish parents Shwan and Ashti, who are from Iraqi Kurdistan. He grew up in a musical family and began singing at an early age, citing Michael Jackson, Stevie Wonder and Whitney Houston as some of his biggest inspirations. He started writing and recording songs at the age of 14 after being discovered by a music producer in school after a performance.

=== 2004–2005: Breakthrough, "The Anthem" and "Darin" ===
Darin became nationally famous in 2004 when he participated in the first season of the Swedish Idol at the age of 16. He quickly became one of the favorite contestants in the show and was the only one to receive 78% of the public votes at the semi-final. He ended up as the runner-up and was signed by SonyBMG the day after the finale. In February 2005 his debut album The Anthem was released. The album quickly entered the Swedish Album Charts at number 1 and was certified gold by the IFPI. His first single "Money for Nothing" was written by Robyn and went straight to No. 1. In 2005, he went on to become the most exposed person in the media in Sweden. They often wrote about his hysterical fans and referred to him as "The perfect popstar".

Later the same year Darin released his second self-titled album, which also peaked at number one. It was his first to be released outside of Sweden, being released in Finland, and was certified platinum. Darin worked with record producer RedOne while creating the album, subsequently releasing the platinum selling "Step Up", which spent a total of 26 weeks on Sverigetopplistan and was also the first single to be released in Finland. Furthermore, the album included the singles "Who's That Girl" and "Want Ya!".

=== 2006: Break the News and Flashback ===
In 2006, Darin won Song of the Year at the Swedish Grammis for "Money for Nothing". Later in 2006, he released his first DVD, Tour Videos Interview, which was mainly a concert DVD from a 2006 tour. In November 2006, Darin released his third album studio album, Break the News, which debuted at number 1 on the Swedish Charts. The album included the singles "Perfect", "Everything But the Girl", "Desire" and "Insanity".

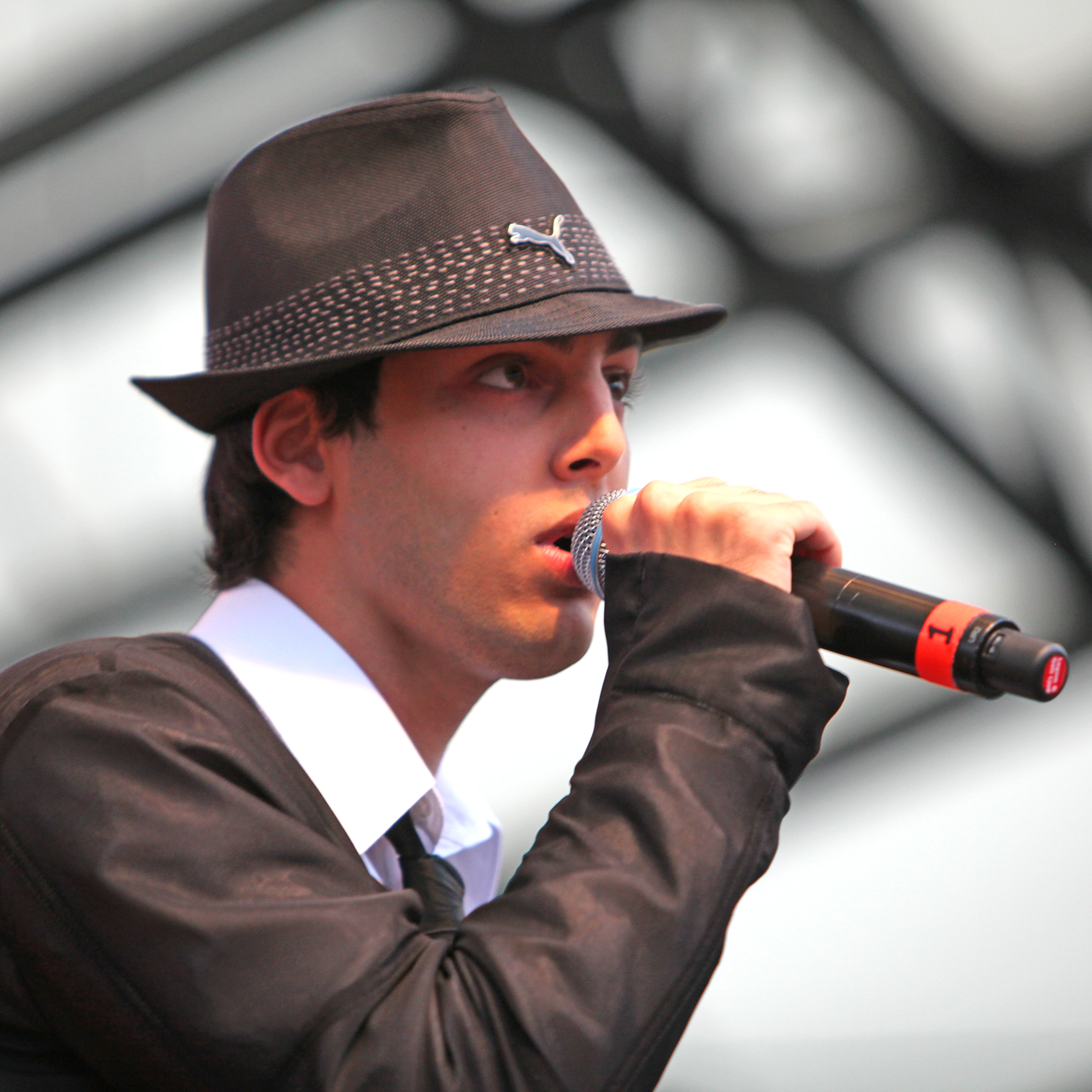
Darin (2009)

In 2007, Darin signed a contract with EMI Germany to release music in Germany, Austria and Switzerland and in August 2007, "Insanity" was released.

In 2008, Darin started to work on his fourth studio album, Flashback, together with RedOne. The album was released in December 2008 and charted at number 10 in Sweden, making it Darin's first album not to reach number one in the country. The album included the singles "Breathing Your Love", a duet with American singer Kat DeLuna, "Runaway" and "What If", a song which was released in collaboration with Friends, a Swedish anti-bullying charity.

In 2009, Darin performed the song Se på mej at Melodifestivalen 2009 as an interval act. In October 2009, Darin performed a cover of Coldplay's "Viva la Vida" on Idol. The song was released as a single, and reached the number one on the Swedish singles chart, making it more successful than Coldplay's original in Sweden.

=== 2010–2013: Lovekiller and Exit ===
In November 2009, it was announced that Darin would be participating in Melodifestivalen 2010. He entered the festival with the mid-tempo ballad "You're Out of My Life", which was written by Tony Nilsson and Henrik Janson. Darin performed 7th in Heat 3 of the contest and progressed to the final ultimately placing 4th.

In June 2010, Darin began a 17 date Summer Tour in Sweden. In August 2010, Darin would soon release the single "Lovekiller". The album of the same name was released in August 2010 and included the singles Viva la Vida, You're Out of My Life, "Can't Stop Love", "Microphone" and "Lovekiller". The album was certified gold in the first week of its release and peaked at number one on the Swedish album chart.

In February 2012 Darin released the single "Nobody Knows", which was the first single from his (then) upcoming album Exit. In October 2012 Swedish television network TV4 aired the first episode of the third season of Så mycket bättre featuring Darin, a reality TV show in which each artist attempts to do their own version of another artists well-known songs, with each person getting an episode featuring a selection of their songs being performed by the other musicians. Darin performed six songs in the show: "Stockholm", "En Apa Som Liknar Dig", "I Can't Get You Off My Mind", "Astrologen", "Magdalena" and "Seven Days a Week". He broke the Swedish singles chart record and had 6 top 10 songs on iTunes at the same time.

On 21 November 2012, Sony Music Sweden released a collection of Darin's songs from his four albums. The collection is titled Det bästa av.

In January 2013, Darin released his sixth studio album, Exit which went straight to number one on the Swedish album chart; becoming his fifth number one album. Darin had spent time in the US working with worldwide known producers and songwriters such as Jim Beanz, The Jackie Boyz, Victoria "Lady V" Horn to make the album, Exit. In May 2013 a new single titled "So Yours" was released in Europe due to a performance as the interval act during the second semi-final of the Eurovision Song Contest 2013 in Malmö. In mid 2013, Darin travelled to the Philippines to film the documentary En resa för livet together with the charity SOS Children's Villages and three musical artists, Eagle-Eye Cherry, Sophie Zelmani and Uno Svenningsson to bring attention to the poverty in the country and also try to gain and collect as many sponsors as possible for the children in the children's villages. Darin and Eagle-Eye Cherry also wrote and sang the lead song "Dream Away" for the documentary that was aired on TV4. All the revenues went to SOS Children's Villages.

=== 2014–2016: Fjärilar i Magen and Dex Music ===
In 2014, Darin started writing new songs in Swedish for the first time. He got inspired by recording a tribute song to the late Ted Gärdestad in the Atlantis Studios in Stockholm, where ABBA also recorded many of their albums and he wanted to record the same way they did.

In March 2015 Darin released his first single "Ta mig tillbaka" from his (then) upcoming Swedish album Fjärilar i magen. It was the first time he recorded a song with only acoustic instruments, which gave the production a different sound to what he had before. The lyrics was an autobiographical story about his childhood and growing up in the 1990s. The single went 4× platinum and was the most streamed song in Swedish that year. The album Fjärilar i magen was released in September 2015 by Darin's own record company Dex Music and became his sixth number one album in Sweden. In 2015, Darin was signed by Sony Music for all the Asian countries, including the Middle East for his previous English album Exit.

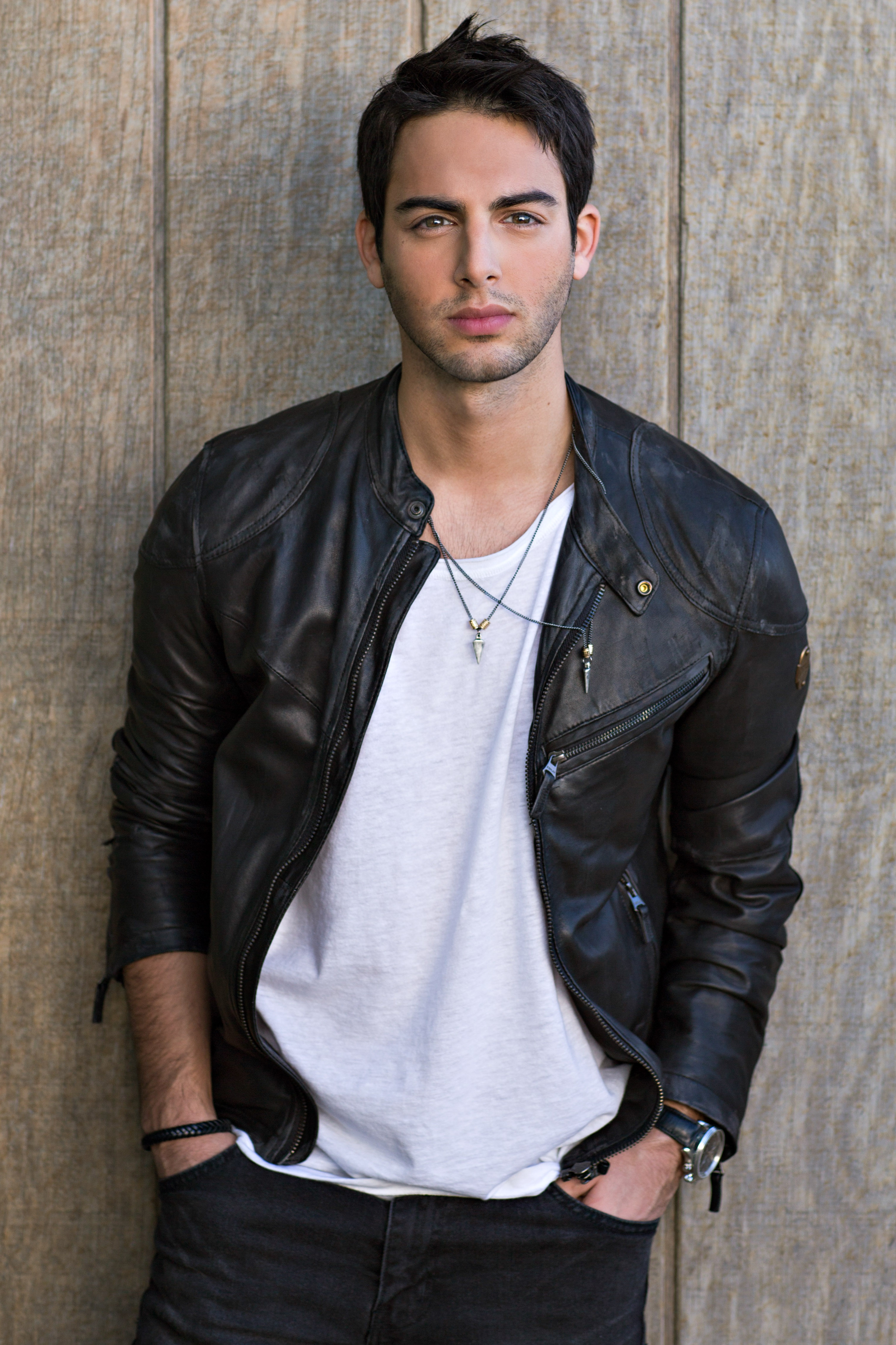
Darin

=== 2017–2019: Tvillingen and Darin Arena Tour ===
In March 2017, Darin released a new song, "Ja må du leva" ("May you live"). "We live in a world that demands a lot from us. There are many ideals that we are supposed to follow and strive for, which aren't really important enough to take such a big focus in our daily lives. I think there are much more important things to focus on, such as having fun and doing things that inspire and make you happy. The lyrics are a comfort urging us to celebrate life," was his own explanation of the song and its lyrics.

In September of the same year, he released two more songs, "Alla ögon på mig" ("All eyes on me") and "Tvillingen" ("The Twin"). "Tvillingen" is also the name of his second Swedish album released in November. The album became his seventh number one album in Sweden and the single his second number one on Svensktoppen, as well as the most played Swedish song on radio in Sweden that year.

During the spring of 2018, Darin embarked on a concert hall tour with 25 stops, including three sold-out nights at Cirkus in Stockholm. On October 26, 2018, Darin released the new single "Identitetslös" ("Identityless") as well as concert tickets for his first arena tour in Sweden. The arena tour consisted of three concerts in the spring of 2019 – Globen in Stockholm on May 4, Scandinavium in Gothenburg on May 11, and Malmö Arena on May 18.

In November 2018, Darin achieved his second one-year run on Svensktoppen with the song "Tvillingen".

=== 2020–2023: En annan jag ===
In February 2020, Darin released the single "En säng av rosor" ("A Bed of Roses"). He describes the song as the most stripped-down single he has released so far, featuring only vocals, a guitar, and a cello. Since then, the song has reached the top position on Svensktoppen, been streamed over 45 million times, and became the fifth most played song in Sweden during the year. During the same month, he also announced the dates for his summer tour, where he would, among other places, perform at Skansen in Stockholm and Dalhalla outside Rättvik. The majority of the tour was subsequently canceled due to the coronavirus pandemic. At the end of December, Darin released a complete live album titled "Live from Ericsson Globe" from last year's arena tour, featuring 24 of the songs from the concert in Stockholm.

On January 7, 2021, Darin's concert from Ericsson Globe, "Darin – Live from Globen," premiered on SVT1 and was also made available on SVT Play the same day. Miss Li, Eagle-Eye Cherry, Daniela Rathana, and Maja Ivarsson were among the artists who appeared as guests during the concert. In February, Darin was named Sweden's LGBTQ person of the year by QX. Darin graced half of the covers of the magazine during the month, with Crown Princess Victoria featured on the other half, winning the award for heterosexual person of the year. "En säng av rosor" was also voted as the song of the year. The song became Darin's 30th song in Sweden to achieve gold or platinum status. Additionally, the song reached the top position on the Spanish iTunes chart after being featured in an emotional scene in the Spanish TV channel Telecinco's documentary about media personality Rocío Carrasco.

During the spring, Darin released the song "Can't Stay Away," which he co-wrote with British songwriter and producer Jamie Hartman. In another interview with Aftonbladet, he mentioned that he intended the song to "breathe gay culture, colors, 70s, energy, and playfulness" and to be "queer and sexy" in a way that the public had not seen him before.

In the Autumn, Darin embarked on his first-ever acoustic tour. It consisted of five evenings at Palladium in Malmö, five evenings at Stora Teatern in Gothenburg, and nine sold-out evenings at Södra Teatern in Stockholm. He stated that his intention with the tour was to get close to the audience and share his thoughts behind the music and lyrics, doing so in some of the country's finest theaters. The tour concluded with a concert at The Bedford in London. On 22 October 2021, he released the song "Holding Me More." He described it as a personal favorite. That same week, the BBC program Music Life aired, a radio program and podcast where a well-known musician interviews other musicians. In this program, Darin interviewed artists and songwriters Zara Larsson, Nina Nesbitt, Bryan Higgins, and Jörgen Elofsson. On November 26, 2021, Darin released his first Christmas song, "What's Christmas Anyway," which he co-wrote with Jörgen Elofsson, who was also involved in writing Darin's hit song "Why Does It Rain."

At the beginning of the year, Darin was launched in Italy for the first time with the single "Can't Stay Away". It quickly became one of the most played songs on radio in the country and reached the top position on both the independent chart and the dance chart within just a few weeks. This was followed by appearances on several of Italy's biggest TV shows.

On May 13, Darin released the single "Superstar", a modern disco-inspired song produced by producer Stuart Price, known for his work on Madonna's album "Confessions on a Dance Floor" and Dua Lipa's album "Future Nostalgia". The song became Darin's second major hit in Italy and also reached the top position on both the dance chart and the independent chart. It became one of the most played songs on radio in Italy during 2022 and also reached the second position on the Swedish radio chart. On May 24, Darin paid tribute to songwriter Diane Warren at the Polar Music Prize with a performance of her song "Because You Loved Me". His interpretation of the song was praised by both the audience and Diane Warren herself, who, according to him, had been a great musical inspiration for him during his upbringing.

Ten years after his success in the TV program "Så mycket bättre" ("So Much Better"), he participated in the program again to celebrate his anniversary. In August, Darin and his song "Superstar" received the award for the year's most played song by an independent artist in Italy from Italy's largest radio station RTL. He was surprised with the award after performing the song at the epic Arena di Verona. The gala was also broadcast live on RTL's TV channel and was attended by several of Italy's biggest artists. On November 4, Darin released the single "Satisfaction", which became Darin's third top 10 song on the radio chart in Italy in the same year. The success in Italy resulted in Darin receiving a request from the Vatican to perform at their annual televised concert Concerto di Natale in December. In connection with this, he also had the opportunity to meet Pope Francis in the Vatican before the performance. Darin performed a medley consisting of the songs "Satisfaction", "Can't Stay Away", and "Superstar". On December 7, he also released an EP "My Purple Clouds", which includes the three singles. At the end of the year, Darin announced the dates for his next tour, an arena tour in Sweden in 2023 with 11 stops around the country.

On May 5, Darin released the new song "Starkare" ("Stronger"), the first single from his upcoming Swedish album "En annan jag" ("Another Me"), planned for release in September. He describes the song as a comfort when going through something difficult in life. "It helped me when I wrote it, and I hope it can also help others out there." In August, the song became the most played on Swedish radio and had also achieved gold status in streaming. In October, it reached the top position on Svensktoppen, the Swedish radio chart.

On June 13, SVT announced that Darin was the artist chosen to perform "Allsångsscenen är din" ("The Sing-along Stage is Yours"), which meant that he would have a full hour concert after the program Allsång på Skansen on August 8 at the Sollidenscenen stage in Skansen. The program and concert were broadcast live on SVT. During the summer of 2023, Darin also released his 50th single, "Satellit" ("Satellite"). In the fall of 2023, Darin embarked on a major arena tour in Sweden (Darin Arena Tour 2023), where he performed in arenas around Sweden. On 15 September 2023, Darin released his ninth studio album, En annan jag. The album charted at number 1 on the Sverigetopplistan. En annan jag was nominated at the Swedish Grammy Awards, which was held in Stockholm on 8 May 2024.

=== 2024–present ===
On 22 March 2024, Darin released the single "Electric"; the single was subsequently added to BBC Radio 2's New Music Playlist, on the B List. In an interview with Spindle magazine, Darin shared, "I met with [Harris and Hurr] and another writer, Jordan Shaw, in London, and this was the first song that we wrote together. I had the story, and we created the song from that, all in one day. The song is about a night out in Palma, Mallorca, where I live. It was one of those spontaneous nights with my closest friends, actually celebrating my birthday. And when I thought things couldn't get better, I met someone special. We were like two magnets drawn to each other that night [...] I want to spread good vibes and positive feelings and hopefully make people want to dance to it." The single became Darin's first ever single to chart in the United Kingdom; it debuted and peaked at number 56 on the UK Singles Downloads Chart. On 24 May 2024, Darin released "Moonlight"; the single was co-written with English singer Conor Maynard.

== Personal life ==
In August 2020, Darin came out as gay.

== Discography ==
=== Albums ===
- The Anthem (2005)
- Darin (2005)
- Break the News (2006)
- Flashback (2008)
- Lovekiller (2010)
- Exit (2013)
- Fjärilar i magen (2015)
- Tvillingen (2017)
- En annan jag (2023)
- Sommarland (2025)

== Awards ==
Darin has received several awards throughout his career, including:

- A Grammis in 2006, Rockbjörn (Rock bear award)
- Nickelodeon Kids Choice Award
- The Voice 06 Award in Sweden
- NRJ Award for Best Nordic song in Finland
- Kurd of the Year award in 2005
- Artist of the Year at the QX Gaygalan Awards in 2013
- LGBTQ of the Year and Song of the Year for "En säng av rosor" at the QX Gaygalan Awards in 2021
- Award PMI at Power Hits Estate for Superstar in 2022
