= 3voor12 =

Dutch multimedia platform for alternative music

Current logo of 3voor12

Former logo of 3voor12

3voor12 (lit. '3 [minutes] to 12') is a multimedia platform for alternative pop music of the Dutch public broadcaster VPRO.

3voor12 had 2 digital television channels (a clip-channel and a concert-channel), different radio channels (ranging from punk and alternative rock to heavy metal), radio programs on NPO 3FM, a website, and a weekly live event (Club 3voor12). In addition, 3voor12 is present at several festivals (Noorderslag, Lowlands, Motel Mozaïque, Pinkpop). 3voor12 has been awarded several times. Among the awards are the UPC Digital Award, the Pritchett-award, the BNN Rookie-Award, and the Gouden Pixel.

Similar in approach to the In a Van Sessions and The Take-Away Shows, the platform presents live performances of many touring artists recorded in elevators and other small rooms in the Netherlands under the umbrella name Behind Closed Doors. These videos are presented on their website, as well as an official 3voor12 YouTube account.

== Radio ==
On radio, 3voor12 broadcasts almost every day between 22:00 and 00:00. The programs are: Club 3voor12 (Eric Corton, live music) and Whitenoise (Dave Clarke, techno music), both broadcast on Dutch radio station NPO 3FM.

== Song of the Year ==
Since 1985, the listeners of 3voor12 have voted for the Song of the Year (Song van het Jaar) every year. All listeners can vote on a longlist at the end of the year. The Song of the Year will then be awarded during a concert evening organized by 3voor12. The Song van het Jaar has had ten Dutch winners with Osdorp Posse (1998), Krezip (2000), Johan (2001), Kyteman (2009), Dotan (2014), De Staat (2016), Kensington (2018), MEROL (2019), Froukje (2021, 2022 2023 and 2024) and S10 (2024). Pixies (1988 and 1989), the Smashing Pumpkins (1993 and 1995) and Radiohead (1996 and 1997) have won twice. Only Froukje has won four times and this was in consecutive years.

Year	Artist	Track
1985	The Jesus and Mary Chain	"Just Like Honey"
1986	Elvis Costello	"I Want You"
1987	R.E.M.	"The One I Love"
1988	Pixies	"Gigantic"
1989	Pixies	"Monkey Gone to Heaven"
1990	Living Colour	"Love Rears Its Ugly Head"
1991	Nirvana	"Smells Like Teen Spirit"
1992	Pearl Jam	"Alive"
1993	The Smashing Pumpkins	"Disarm"
1994	dEUS	"Suds & Soda"
1995	The Smashing Pumpkins	"Bullet with Butterfly Wings"
1996	Radiohead	"Street Spirit (Fade Out)"
1997	Radiohead	"Paranoid Android"
1998	Osdorp Posse	"10 Jaar O.P."
1999	Red Hot Chili Peppers	"Scar Tissue"
2000	Krezip	"I Would Stay"
2001	Johan	"Tumble and Fall"
2002	Queens of the Stone Age	"No One Knows"
2003	The White Stripes	"Seven Nation Army"
2004	Franz Ferdinand	"Take Me Out"
2005	Kaiser Chiefs	"Oh My God"
2006	The Raconteurs	"Steady, As She Goes"
2007	Editors	"Smokers Outside the Hospital Doors"
2008	Kings of Leon	"Sex on Fire"
2009	Kyteman	"Sorry"
2010	Mumford & Sons	"The Cave"
2011	Gotye ft. Kimbra	"Somebody That I Used to Know"
2012	Ben Howard	"Keep Your Head Up"
2013	Daft Punk ft. Pharrell Williams	"Get Lucky"
2014	Dotan	"Home"
2015	Tame Impala	"Let It Happen"
2016	De Staat	"Make The Call, Leave It All"
2017	Arcade Fire	"Everything Now"
2018	Kensington	"Slicer"
2019	MEROL	"Hou je bek en bef me"
2020	The Weeknd	"Blinding Lights"
2021	Froukje	"Ik Wil Dansen"
2022	Froukje ft. S10	"Zonder Gezicht"
2023	Froukje	"Als Ik God Was"
2024	Froukje & S10	"Ik Haat Hem Voor Jou"
2025	Sef ft. Wende	"Voor Alles Bang"

== See also ==
- De Afrekening
