= Julen är här =

Julen är här may refer to:

- Julen är här, 1989 Tommy Körberg album
- Julen är här, Christmas song written by Billy Butt och Sölve Rydell
- Julen är här, 1988 Small, Fat 'n Beautiful Christmas song
- Julen är här, Swedish language-lyrics version of Rockin' Around the Christmas Tree
