= Emma-Lee (song) =

Single by Johan Palm

from the album My Antidote
- Released: April 2009
- Composer(s): Mårten Eriksson, Ashley Hicklin, Lina Eriksson
- Producer(s): Peter Månsson

"Emma-Lee" is the first single taken from Swedish singer Johan Palm's debut studio album My Antidote, which was released after his participation in Idol 2008. The song reached number one on the Swedish Singles Chart and was composed by British Singer-Songwriter Ashley Hicklin, Swedish writer-producer Mårten Eriksson and his partner Lina Eriksson.

== Charts ==
Chart (2009)	Peak position
Swedish Singles Chart	1
