= Plug It In =

Studio album by Krezip
- Released: 11 May 2007 (Original version); 29 February 2008 (Special edition)
- Recorded: 2006–2007 at ICP Studio, Brussels (Normal tracks); December 29, 2007 at HMH (Live bonus tracks); 2007 at Zeezicht Studio's ("Everybody's Gotta Learn..."); 2008 at Hannemann/Hoekstra Studio, Groningen ("Look What You've Done")
- Genre: Pop rock, rock, dance
- Length: 40:11
- Label: Sony BMG
- Producer: Adel Dahdal & Peter Mansson (normal tracks); Tijmen Zinkhaan (bonus tracks); Krezip ("Everybody's Gotta Learn Sometime")

Krezip chronology
What Are You Waiting For? (2005)	Plug It In (2007)

Singles from Plug It In
- 1. "Plug It In & Turn Me On" Released: 2007; 2. "Play This Game With Me" Released: 2007; 3. "All My Life" Released: 2007; 4. "Everybody's Gotta Learn Sometime" Released: 2008

Plug It In is the fourth album by Dutch rock band Krezip. It is their second album on their new label Sony BMG. The album was released on May 11, 2007. It notably features a disco-inspired sound on most of its songs as opposed to the alternative rock sound of earlier albums. This was because the band decided they needed a big change to their sound after ten years. Lead singer Jacqueline Govaert decided to base this new sound on bands such as Blondie and The Sounds; in fact, members Jesper Anderberg and Felix Rodriguez of The Sounds co-wrote some of the album's tracks.

A special edition of the album was released on February 29, 2008.

== Track listing ==
1. "Play This Game With Me" (Jacqueline Govaert, Felix Rodriguez, Jesper Anderberg) - 04:00
2. "Life Is Sweet" (Govaert, Adel Dahdal, Peter Mansson) - 03:31
3. "Plug It In & Turn Me On" (Govaert, JanPeter Hoekstra) - 03:41
4. "Ordinary Day" (Govaert, Hoekstra) - 03:27
5. "Can't You Be Mine" (Govaert, Wizardz of Oz) - 03:02
6. "Easy Way Out" (Govaert, Hoekstra) - 03:13
7. "Not Tonight" (Govaert, Malcolm Pardon, Fredrik Rinman) - 04:10
8. "Bored" (Govaert, Malcolm Pardon, Fredrik Rinman) - 03:29
9. "You're Wrong" (Govaert, Rodriguez, Anderberg) - 03:25
10. "Hey There Love" (Govaert, Hoekstra) - 04:35
11. "All My Life" (Govaert, Rodriguez, Anderberg) - 03:36
  - Bonus tracks on Special Edition:
12. "Everybody's Gotta Learn Sometime" (James Warren) - 04:27
13. "Plug It In & Turn Me On" - Live @ HMH (Govaert, Hoekstra) - 03:43
14. "I Would Stay" - Live @ HMH (Govaert) - 06:39
15. "All My Life" - Live @ HMH (Govaert, Rodriguez, Anderberg) - 04:00
16. "Venus" - Live @ HMH (Robbie van Leeuwen) - 03:21
17. "Look What You've Done" (Govaert, Hoekstra) - 02:16

== Credits ==
Band members:

- Jacqueline Govaert - Vocals, piano
- Anne Govaert - Guitars, backing vocals
- JanPeter Hoekstra - Guitars
- Annelies Kuijsters - Keyboards, backing vocals
- Joost van Haaren - Bass
- Bram van den Berg - Drums

Personnel:

- Adel Dahdal & Peter Mansson - Recording, production and mixing (Original album tracks)
- Djoum - Assistant engineer
- Bjorn Engelmann - Mastering (Original album tracks)
- Pontus Hagberg - String arrangements on "All My Life" and "Ordinary Day"
- Tijmen Zinkhaan - Production, recording and mixing on "Everybody's Gotta Learn Sometime" and live bonus tracks
- JanPeter Hoekstra & Hans Hanneman - Recording and mixing on "Look What You've Done"
- Darius van Helfteren - Mastering (bonus tracks)
- Ruud Baan - Photography
- Pascal Duval - Art direction and design

== Charts ==
=== Weekly charts ===
Chart (2007)	Peak position
Belgian Albums (Ultratop Flanders)	40
Dutch Albums (Album Top 100)	3

=== Year-end charts ===
Chart (2007)	Position
Dutch Albums (Album Top 100)	49
Chart (2008)	Position
Dutch Albums (Album Top 100)	80
