= En helt ny jul =

Studio album by Amy Diamond
- Released: 19 November 2008
- Recorded: Cosmos Studios, Sami, Kingside and Fonara Studios
- Genre: Christmas
- Length: 42 minutes
- Label: Bonnier Amigo Music Group
- Producer: Ollie Olsson, Henrik Edenhed

Amy Diamond chronology
Music in Motion (2007)	En helt ny jul (2008)	Swings And Roundabouts (2009)

En helt ny jul is a Christmas album by Amy Diamond, and her first album in Swedish. It was released in 2008 on the Bonnier Amigo Music Group label. It consists of both older and newer Christmas songs.

== Track listing ==
Nr.	Title	Music	Lyrics	Length
1	Nu tändas tusen juleljus "(instrumental-intro)"	Emmy Köhler		0:30
2	När vi närmar oss jul	Anders Glenmark		4:21
3	En helt ny jul	Robert Habolin		4:16
4	Hej, mitt vinterland	Britt Lindeborg		2:18
5	Mer jul	Adolphson & Falk		3:36
6	När julen rullar över världen	Allan Eyvind and Patrik Frisk		4:02
7	Jul, jul, strålande jul	Gustaf Nordqvist	Edvard Evers	2:40
8	Tänd ett ljus	Niklas Strömstedt and Lasse Lindbom		4:38
9	Kom håll min hand	Pelle Ekerstam		3:51
10	Viskar en bön	Mauro Scocco and Peter Hallström		3:16
11	Betlehems stjärna ("Gläns över sjö och strand")	Alice Tegnér	Viktor Rydberg	4:53
12	Julen är här	Billy Butt and Sölve Rydell		3:17
13	Nu tändas tusen juleljus "(instrumental-outro)"	Emmy Köhler		0:47

== Contributors ==
- Amy Diamond - vocals
- Per Lindvall - drums
- Sven Lindvall - bass
- Mats Schubert (BKO) - keyboard
- Ola Gustafsson - guitar

== Charts ==
=== Weekly charts ===
Chart (2008)	Peak position
Swedish Albums (Sverigetopplistan)	8

=== Year-end charts ===
Chart (2008)	Position
Swedish Albums (Sverigetopplistan)	47
