= Break the News =

Studio album by Darin
- Released: 22 November 2006
- Length: 41:02
- Labels: RCA; Sony BMG
- Producers: Per Aldeheim; Patrik Berger; Rikard Branden; Jörgen Elofsson; Anders Hansson; Gustav "Grizzly" Jonsson; Peter Mansson; Eshraque "iSHi" Mughal; Fredrik Thomander; Tommy Tysper; Pär Westerlund; Anders Wikström

Darin chronology
Darin (2005)	Break the News (2006)	Flashback (2008)

Singles from Break the News
- 1. "Perfect" Released: 18 October 2006; 2. "Everything But the Girl" Released: 31 January 2007; 3. "Desire" Released: 7 May 2007; 4. "Insanity" Released: 3 August 2007

Break the News is the third studio album by Swedish singer Darin. It was released on 22 November 2006 in Sweden. The album reached the top of the Swedish Album Charts. Four singles were released from the album in Sweden with an additional track charting from promotion.

== Promotion ==
In Sweden, Break the News was promoted with two official singles, "Perfect" and "Everything But the Girl". The third single, "Desire", was released as a download only single in May 2007. In Germany, two physical singles were released; "Insanity" in August 2007 and "Desire".

Darin promoted the album with a ten cities tour from 25 November until 16 December 2006. Large billboard posters were placed around Swedish cities Stockholm, Gothenburg and Malmö. He also promoted the album in Germany, including performances on Popstars, where he sang "Desire", and on The Dome where he sang "Insanity". In 2007, Darin embarked on The Pure Desire Tour.

== Track listing ==
Break the News track listing
No.	Title	Writer(s)	Producers(s)	Length
1.	"Insanity"	Peter Mansson; Patric Sarin; Darin Zanyar	Mansson; Sarin^{[a]}	3:45
2.	"Extra Ordinary Love"	Max Martin; Rami Yacoub; Robin Carlsson; Patrik Berger	P. Berger	3:16
3.	"Perfect"	Anders Wikström; Fredrik Thomander; Robbie Nevil	Wikström; Thomander	3:00
4.	"Everything But the Girl"	Wikström; Thomander	Wikström; Thomander	3:48
5.	"Desire"	Zanyar; Mansson; Sarin	Mansson; Sarin^{[a]}	3:08
6.	"Like No One"	P. Berger; Fredrik Berger	P. Berger	3:30
7.	"Saturday Night"	Zanyar; Per Aldeheim	Aldeheim	3:18
8.	"What If I Kissed You Now"	Anders Hansson; Molly Sandén	Hansson	3:29
9.	"Everything You're Not"	Eshraque "iSHi" Mughal	Mughal	3:20
10.	"If You Wanna"	Zanyar; Remee; David Eriksen	Mughal	3:08
11.	"The Thing About You"	Tommy Tysper; Markus Reza Sepehrmanesh; Sophia Somajo; Gustav "Grizzly" Jonsson	Jonsson; Tysper	3:39
12.	"Homeless"	Jörgen Elofsson	Elofsson; Rikard Branden; Pär Westerlund	3:40

iTunes bonus track
No.	Title	Writer(s)	Producers(s)	Length
13.	"Affection"	Remee; Mughal; Eriksen	Mughal	3:12

Notes

- ^{^[a]} signifies additional producer(s)

== Personnel ==
- Per Aldeheim – producer
- B-Martin.se – album photography
- Patrik Berger – producer
- Rikard Branden – producer
- Jörgen Elofsson – producer
- Björn Engelmann – mastering
- Nicklas Flyckt – mixer
- Anders Hansson – producer
- Gustav "Grizzly" Jonsson – mixer, producer
- Ronny Lahti – mixer
- Malin Lillewarg – album cover design
- Peter Mansson – executive producer, mixer, producer
- Roberto Martorell – mixer
- Eshraque "iSHi" Mughal – mixer, producer
- Ollie Olson – mixer
- RedOne – mixer
- Patric Sarin – executive producer
- Fredrik Thomander – mixer, producer
- Tommy Tysper – producer
- Anti Wendel – album photography
- Pär Westerlund – producer
- Anders Wikström – mixer, producer
- Darin Zanyar – vocals

== Charts ==
Weekly chart performance for Break the News
Chart (2006–07)	Peak position
German Albums (Offizielle Top 100)	89
Swedish Albums (Sverigetopplistan)	1

== Certifications ==
Certifications for Break the News
Region	Certification	Certified units/sales
Sweden (GLF)	Gold	20,000^{^}
^{^} Shipments figures based on certification alone.

== Release history ==
Release history for Break the News
Region	Date	Format	Label	Catalgoue
Sweden	22 November 2006	CD; digital download	RCA; BMG	88697 01596 2
Europe	28 September 2007	CD; digital download	EMI Music	50999 507169 2 0
