= My Antidote =

Studio album by Johan Palm
- Released: May 2009
- Length: 36 minutes
- Label: Sony
- Producer: Peter Mansson

My Antidote is the debut studio album by Swedish singer Johan Palm, released in May 2009. It features ten songs, including the number one hit single "Emma-Lee".

== Track listing ==
1. Teenage Battlefield [03:39]
2. Emma-Lee [03:03]
3. Come On [03:57]
4. All The Time In The World [03:54]
5. Danger Danger [03:34]
6. Antidote [03:45]
7. Satellite [04:13]
8. You're Killing Me [03:44]
9. More to Her Than Meets The Eye [02:51]
10. Let The Dream Begin [04:18]

== Contributing musicians ==
- Johan Palm – vocals
- Peter Mansson – drums, percussion, guitar, keyboard, producer
- Joakim Hemming – bass

== Charts ==
Chart (2009)	Peak position
Sweden (Sverigetopplistan)	3
