= Echo Heart =

Studio album by Markus Fagervall
- Released: 18 December 2006
- Genre: rock
- Length: 42 minutes
- Label: Sony BMG

Markus Fagervall chronology
Echo Heart (2006)	Steal My Melody (2008)

Echo Heart is the debut album by Swedish singer Markus Fagervall, released on 19 December 2006.

== Track listing ==
1. All the Way
2. How Come You're the One
3. Close My Eyes
4. Everything Changes
5. Something Real
6. For Once
7. Indian Sky
8. Heartstopper (You Got Me Started)
9. The Best of What I Got
10. Hole in the Sky
11. Only You (Young and True)

== Personnel ==
- Markus Fagervall – vocals
- Fredrik Thomander – bass
- Peter Månsson – drums
- Anders Wikström – guitar
- Jocke Svalberg – keyboard

== Charts ==
=== Weekly charts ===
Chart (2006–2007)	Peak position
Swedish Albums (Sverigetopplistan)	1

=== Year-end charts ===
Chart (2006)	Position
Swedish Albums (Sverigetopplistan)	3
Chart (2007)	Position
Swedish Albums (Sverigetopplistan)	95
