= I Would Stay =

2000 single by Krezip

Single by Krezip

from the album Nothing Less
- Released: 16 June 2000
- Studio: RS29 (Waalwijk, Netherlands)
- Length: 3:51
- Label: Warner Music
- Songwriter(s): Jacqueline Govaert
- Producer(s): Oscar Holleman

Krezip singles chronology
"Won't Cry" (2000)	"I Would Stay" (2000)	"All Unsaid" (2000)

"I Would Stay" is a song by Dutch pop rock band Krezip. It was released on 16 June 2000 as the second single from the band's debut album Nothing Less.

Written by the band's singer Jacqueline Govaert, the song reached the number one spot of the Dutch Top 40 for three weeks, including during Krezip's highly publicized performance at the 2000 Pinkpop Festival. It was also a number-one hit in the Flanders region of Belgium. It was later declared to be the third-biggest hit of the year per the Dutch Top 40, and also the seventh-biggest hit of the decade per the Dutch Single Top 100.

== Background ==
Lead singer and songwriter Jacqueline Govaert wrote the song when she was 17 years old after getting into arguments with her mother. "I always thought, still actually, now I have it all figured out. I already understand how life works," Govaert said.

Krezip's performance at the 2000 Pinkpop Festival, which has been labeled by multiple sources as one of the most iconic in the festival's history, was nationally televised and culminated in the performance of "I Would Stay" near the end of their set. Govaert was 18 years old during the performance.

For a while, Govaerts did not want to perform the song, but she is happy with it again. "Many people recognise themselves in it, it has become a special song for me. And I see that same struggle of your parents breaking away from my own children now. They're ashamed of me in the schoolyard now too," she said in 2023.

The song was sampled by Scooter in the song "Bit a Bad Boy" from the album Under the Radar Over the Top. SMD used a sample in their song "Just Like You", and Scott Brown remixed the song in 2001, titled "Turn Up the Music", even though Krezip is uncredited on that version.

The song has never left the top 500 of the annual Dutch Top 2000 program since its release. Its highest position was #139 in 2003.

== Track list ==
=== CD single ===
1. I Would Stay (Album Version)
2. In Her Head (Live at Pinkpop)
3. In Her Sun (Stupid) (Live at Pinkpop)
4. I Would Stay (Live at Pinkpop)

== Charts ==
=== Weekly charts ===
Chart (2000)	Peak position
Belgium (Ultratop 50 Flanders)	1
Netherlands (Dutch Top 40)	1
Netherlands (Single Top 100)	2

=== Year-end charts ===
Chart (2000)	Position
Belgium (Ultratop Flanders)	1
Netherlands (Dutch Top 40)	3
Netherlands (Single Top 100)	2

=== Decade-end charts ===
Chart (2000–09)	Position
Netherlands (Single Top 100)	7
