= Nothing Less =

Studio album by Krezip
- Released: 23 June 2000
- Recorded: 2000
- Genre: Alternative rock
- Length: 44:49
- Label: Warner Music
- Producer: Oscar Holleman

Krezip chronology
Run Around EP (1999)	Nothing Less (2000)	Days Like This (2002)

Singles from Nothing Less
- 1. "Won't Cry" Released: 2000; 2. "I Would Stay" Released: 2000; 3. "All Unsaid" Released: 2000; 4. "Everything and More" Released: 2001

Nothing Less is the first album by Krezip. It debuted at #1 in both the Netherlands and Belgium.

== Track list ==
All songs written by Jacqueline Govaert except where noted.

1. "All Unsaid" (Govaert/Van Haaren) - 3:07
2. "Won't Cry" - 3:14
3. "Give My Life" - 3:27
4. "I Would Stay" - 3:50
5. "Protection" - 2:46
6. "Why Do I" - 3:59
7. "Thought That You Would Be" - 2:42
8. "Get It On" - 3:55
9. "Everything and More" - 4:05
10. "Happy Now" - 3:39
11. "I'll Be Gone" - 2:42
12. "Let It Go" - 3:03
13. "Fine" - 4:20

== Personnel ==
- Jacqueline Govaert - vocals, piano
- Anne Govaert - guitar
- Joost van Haaren - bass guitar
- Annelies Kuijsters - guitar, backing vocals
- Thijs Romeijn - drums
- Oscar Holleman - production

== Charts ==
=== Weekly charts ===
Chart (2000)	Peak position
Belgian Albums (Ultratop Flanders)	1
Dutch Albums (Album Top 100)	1

=== Year-end charts ===
Chart (2000)	Position
Belgian Albums (Ultratop Flanders)	3
Dutch Albums (Album Top 100)	2
Chart (2001)	Position
Belgian Albums (Ultratop Flanders)	89
Dutch Albums (Album Top 100)	65
