= Välkommen till min jul =

Studio album by Jan Malmsjö
- Released: 5 November 2001
- Recorded: Room Studios, Stockholm, Sweden, 2001
- Genre: Christmas, schlager
- Length: 41 minutes
- Label: EMG

Välkommen till min jul, was released on 5 November 2001, and is a Jan Malmsjö Christmas album. The album peaked at 20th position at the Swedish albums chart.

== Track listing ==
1. Bella Notte
2. Frid på Jorden
3. En släde för två (Sleigh Ride)
4. Stilla natt (Stille Nacht, heilige Nacht)
5. När frosten nyper i din kind (The Christmas Song)
6. När det lider mot jul
7. På himlen tändas ett ljus
8. Julen är här
9. Jag ska hem till julen (I'll Be Home for Christmas)
10. Klang min vackra bjällra
11. Dagen är kommen (O Come all ye Faithful)
12. Hosiana in Exelcis Deo
13. Den lilla trumslagarpojken (The Little Drummer Boy)

== Charts ==
Chart (2001–2002)	Peak position
Sweden (Sverigetopplistan)	20

== Contributors ==
- Peter Ljung - piano
- Staffan Astner, Billy Bremner, Micke Littwold - guitar
- Sven Lindvall - drums
- Johan Granström - bass
