= Peter Mansson =

Swedish music producer and songwriter

- Born: Peter Månsson
- Origin: Varberg, Sweden
- Genres: Pop, rock, dance-pop, pop rock
- Occupations: Songwriter, producer
- Instruments: Drums, guitar, bass, keyboards, backing vocals
- Years active: 1994 – present
- Labels: MIR
- Formerly of: Vildsvin
- Website: http://www.petermansson.com

Peter Månsson is a Swedish music producer and songwriter, who often writes his name as Peter Mansson when working with non-Swedish artists. He is based in MIR Studios, Stockholm, Sweden.

== Discography ==
Production, Mixing and/or Songwriting

- "Want You Back" (Mandy Moore)
- "Make It Happen" (Blue)
- "Come" (Namie Amuro)
- "Only You" (Namie Amuro)
- "Next Flight" (Passpo)
- "Straight Up (No Bends)" (Brian Harvey)
- My Love Is For Real (Victoria Beckham) (Prev. Not Released)
- "Stop Waiting (Start Living)" (Neverstore)
- "All Star Loser" (Neverstore)
- "So Much Of Not Enough" (Neverstore)
- "Stay Forever" (Neverstore)
- "Nanana" (Neverstore)
- "Another Senimental Argument" (Neverstore)
- "L.Y.D." (Neverstore)
- "Racer" (Neverstore)
- "On Your Side" (Neverstore)
- "Golden Youth" (Neverstore)
- "Golden Youth" (Neverstore)
- "Last Goodbye" (Neverstore)
- "Rock The Fool" (Neverstore)
- "Rejected All Along" (Neverstore)
- "History" (Neverstore)
- "Hold On" (Neverstore)
- "Out Of Breath" (Neverstore)
- "Run And Hide" (Neverstore)
- "Waiting" (Neverstore)
- "My Greatest Enemy" (Neverstore)
- "And There She Goes" (Neverstore)
- "Count Me Out" (Neverstore)
- "King Of The World" (Neverstore)
- "Over And Out" (Neverstore)
- "Thank You" (Neverstore)
- "Åh vilken härlig dag" (Magnus Uggla)
- "Tvättbräda" (Magnus Uggla)
- "Fredagskväll på Hallen" (Magnus Uggla)
- "Pärlor åt svin" (Magnus Uggla)
- "Vild och skild" (Magnus Uggla)
- "Borta bra men hemma bäst" (Magnus Uggla)
- "Det är vårt liv" (Magnus Uggla)
- "Coverbandens förlovade land" (Magnus Uggla)
- "Min igen" (Magnus Uggla)
- "Du och jag mot hela världen" (Magnus Uggla)
- "24 Timmar" (Magnus Uggla)
- All The Way (Markus Fagervall)
- How Come You’re The One (Markus Fagervall)
- Close My Eyes (Markus Fagervall)
- Something Real (Markus Fagervall)
- For Once (Markus Fagervall)
- Indian Sky (Markus Fagervall)
- Heartstopper (Markus Fagervall)
- The Best Of What I Got (Markus Fagervall)
- Hole In The Sky (Markus Fagervall)
- Only You (Markus Fagervall)
- "Insanity" (Darin)
- "Desire" (Darin)
- Saturday Night (add Prod & Mix) (Darin)
- Play This Game With Me (Krezip)
- Life Is Sweet (Krezip)
- Plug It In & Turn Me On (Krezip)
- Ordinary Day (Krezip)
- Can’t Be Mine (Krezip)
- Easy Way Out (Krezip)
- Not Tonight (Krezip)
- Bored (Krezip)
- You’re Wrong (Krezip)
- Hey There Love (Krezip)
- All My Life (Krezip)
- Falling Apart (Krezip)
- Get Me (Krezip)
- This Is Our Night (Gio)
- "Une étincelle" (L5)
- Heartbreak Lullaby (A*Teens)
- Slammin’ Kinda Love (A*Teens)
- I Wish It Could Be Christmas Every Day (A*Teens)
- San Toi (Judith Berard)
- Heartbeat (Tymes 4)
- Take Me Alive (Dons)
- American Lovebite (Dons)
- When Love Turns To Pain (Dons)
- Mr Green (Dons)
- Just Save Me (Dons)
- Berlin Berlin (Happy Gigolos)
- Tjenare Kungen (Tjenare Kungen)
- Do You Like To Watch (Lola Ponce)
- (Theme From) Lucy Street (Lucy Street)
- Don’t Stop The Music (Lucy Street)
- Come My Way (Sophie Monk)
- Shame (Anna Abreu)
- Bad Girl (Anna Abreu)
- (Too Late) To Save It With A Lovesong (Patric Nuo)
- Remedy (Charlotte Perrelli)
- "Under mitt tunna skinn" (Patrik Isaksson)
- "Du som tog mitt hjärta" (Patrik Isaksson & Sarah Dawn Finer)
- Right Place, Right Time (B3)
- Right Thing To Do (Sandy & Junior)
- Vidare (Adolphson & Falk)
- Hav (Adolphson & Falk)
- Blinkar Blå (Adolphson & Falk)
- Soloviolin (Adolphson & Falk)
- Krafter Vi Aldrig Känner (Adolphson & Falk)
- I Nattens Lugn (Adolphson & Falk)
- Ifrån (Adolphson & Falk)
- Låter Det Ske (Adolphson & Falk)
- 5:e Avenyn (Adolphson & Falk)
- Sthlms Serenad (Adolphson & Falk)
- Ljuset PÅ Min Väg (Adolphson & Falk)
- Tyngdlös (Adolphson & Falk)
- Hals Över Huvud (Lena & Orup)
- Nu När Du Gått (Lena & Orup)
- Fotbollsstjärna (Lena & Orup)
- Jag Hatar Att Vakna Utan DIg (Lena & Orup)
- 1 Skäl (Lena & Orup)
- Fem Minuter I Himmelen (Lena & Orup)
- Bara En Polis (Lena & Orup)
- Så Mycket Bättre Än Dom Andra (Lena & Orup)
- Blott En Skugga (Lena & Orup)
- Nu När Du Gått (Cinderella Version) (Lena & Orup)
- Fotbollsstjärna (Gary Sundgren Version) (Lena & Orup)
- Paradise (Monotypes)
- Celebration (Monotypes)
- Real Love (Cries For More) (Monotypes)
- Dead Streets (Monotypes) (Greys Anatomy)
- Hurricane (Monotypes)
- Intro (Monotypes)
- Prez Rixon (Monotypes)
- Volga (Monotypes)
- All That You Need (Monotypes)
- The Shore (Monotypes)
- Lose It All Tonight (Monotypes)
- Lea (Monotypes)
- One Minute (Monotypes)
- Teenage Battlefield (Johan Palm)
- Emma-Lee (Johan Palm)
- Come On (Johan Palm)
- All The Time In The World (Johan Palm)
- Danger Danger (Johan Palm)
- Antidote (Johan Palm)
- Satellite (Johan Palm)
- You're Killing Me (Johan Palm)
- More To Her Than Meets The Eye (Johan Palm)
- Let The Dream Begin (Johan Palm)
- A Hundred Different Ways (Kevin Borg)
- Tonight (Johannes)
- Between A Rock And A Hard Place (Album 12 Songs) (Erik Grönwall)
- A New Day Sun (Album 11 Songs) (Treadstone)
- "Stubborn" (Bonnie Tyler)

=== Mix Only ===
- "The War Is Over" (Treat)
- "All In" (Treat)
- "Paper Tiger" (Treat)
- "Roar" (Treat)
- "Tangled Up" (Treat)
- "Heaven Can Wait" (Treat)
- "I’m Not Runnin’" (Treat)
- "Breathless" (Treat)
- "Famous" (Play)
- Girls (Play)
- Trash (Play)
- Punkdrömmar (Ingenting)
- Suzanne (Vi Kan Inte Gå Hand I Hand) (Ingenting)
