= Insanity (song) =

Single by Darin

from the album Break the News
- Released: 3 August 2007
- Length: 3:45
- Label: EMI
- Songwriter(s): Peter Mansson, Patric Sarin, Darin Zanyar

Darin singles chronology
"Desire" (2007)	"Insanity" (2007)	"Breathing Your Love" (2008)

Darin German singles chronology
"Insanity" (2007)	"Desire" (2007)

"Insanity" is a song written by Peter Mansson, Patric Sarin, Darin Zanyar and recorded by Swedish singer Darin. It was released as the fourth single from Darin's third studio record Break the News, though it was the first release from the album in Germany and other selected European countries.

== Formats and track listings ==
Enhanced CD Maxi single:

1. "Insanity" — 3:45
2. "Insanity" (The Attic House Mix) — 7:23
3. "Insanity" (Instrumental) — 3:46
4. "The Anthem" — 3.01
5. "Insanity" (Video) — 3:45
6. "Insanity" (Video "making of") — 4:44

== Charts ==
"Insanity" debuted in Germany at number 47. It spent eight weeks on the chart and peaked at number 20 in its ninth week.

Chart (2007)	Peak position
Ö3 Austria Top 40	47
German Singles Chart	20
