= Mer jul =

Christmas song by Adolphson & Falk

Single by Adolphson & Falk

from the album Eldorado. Stjärnornas musik
- Language: Swedish
- B-side: "Julen är en härlig tid"
- Released: 1982
- Genre: Christmas, pop
- Length: 3:53
- Label: Air Music
- Songwriters: Adolphson & Falk

"Mer jul" (lit. 'More Christmas') is a Swedish Christmas song, written and originally recorded by Adolphson & Falk.

The song features synth instrumentation and references several old and modern Swedish Christmas traditions and themes in its self-deprecating lyrics about Christmas obsession, with notable sampling from Disney's From All of Us to All of You. It was originally recorded on Kjell Alinge's radio program Eldorado in December 1981 and was released on the 1982 compilation album Eldorado. Stjärnornas musik. A new version of the song was released as a single in 1984, reaching the 20th and the 16th position while charting at Trackslistan during the period 15–22 December 1984.

In 2008, the song was recorded by Amy Diamond on the album En helt ny jul.

== Chart positions ==
Chart (1991–1992, 1996, 2007–)	Peak position
Sweden (Sverigetopplistan)	5
