= Perfect (Darin song) =

Single by Darin

from the album Break the News
- Released: 18 October 2006
- Recorded: 2006
- Genre: Pop
- Length: 3:00
- Label: Columbia
- Songwriter(s): Anders Wikström, Fredrik Thomander, Robbie Nevil
- Producer(s): Björn Engelmann Cutting Room Studios

Darin singles chronology
"Want Ya!" (2006)	"Perfect" (2006)	"Everything But the Girl" (2007)

"Perfect" is a song by Swedish singer Darin. It was released as the lead single from Darin's third studio album, Break the News, in Sweden on 18 October 2006.

== Music video ==
The accompanying music video shows a teenage girl, watching a video of Darin performing the song, dancing in her bedroom while different colored backgrounds in her bedroom are projected. The video ends with Darin emerging from the TV, subsequently standing face to face with the girl.

== Formats and track listings ==
CD single

1. "Perfect" — 3:00
2. "Perfect" (instrumental) — 2:59

== Charts ==
Chart (2006)	Peak position
Sweden (Sverigetopplistan)	3
Finland (Suomen virallinen lista)	4
