= Wamel =

- Village
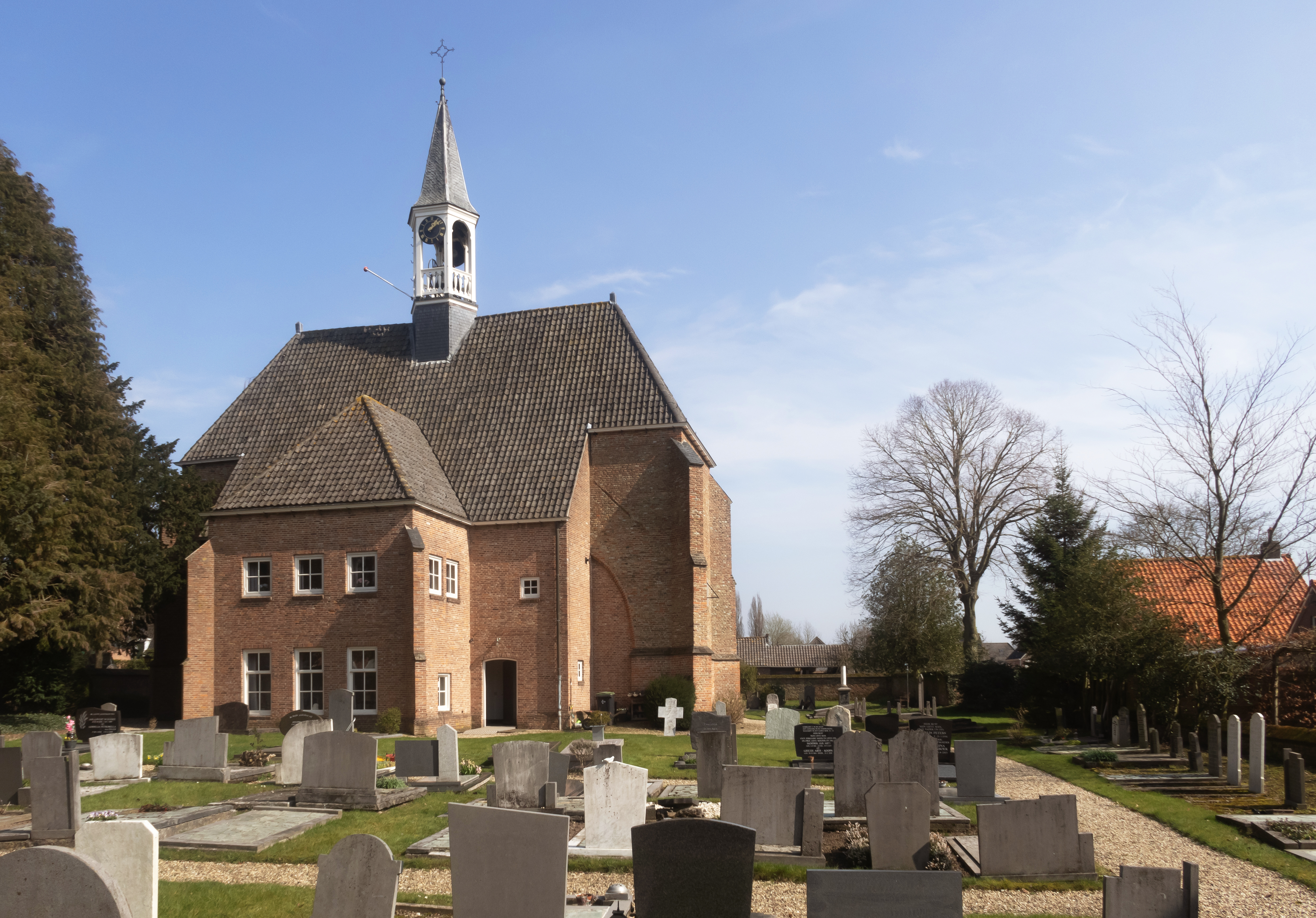
- Reformed church of Wamel

- Coat of arms

- Location in the Netherlands Wamel (Netherlands)
- Coordinates: 51°53′N 5°28′E
- Country: Netherlands
- Province: Gelderland
- Municipality: West Maas en Waal

Area
  - Total: 13.66 km^{2} (5.27 sq mi)
- Elevation: 7 m (23 ft)

Population (2021)
  - Total: 2,470
  - Density: 181/km^{2} (468/sq mi)
- Time zone: UTC+1 (CET)
  - Summer (DST): UTC+2 (CEST)
- Postal code: 6659
- Dialing code: 0487

Wamel is a village in the Dutch province of Gelderland. It is part of the West Maas en Waal municipality, about 3 km east of Tiel.

Wamel was a separate municipality until 1984, when it merged with Appeltern and Dreumel. The new municipality was first called "Wamel", but changed to "West Maas en Waal" in 1985. Ad van der Meer and Onno Boonstra, "Repertorium van Nederlandse gemeenten", KNAW, 2006.

It was first mentioned in 893 as Uamele. The etymology is unclear. The village developed into an elongated settlement. The Dutch Reformed Church dates from 1572 and replaces a demolished earlier church. Between 1878 and 1879, a Roman Catholic church was built. It was destroyed in 1944, and rebuilt between 1952 and 1954. In 1840, it was home to 1,453 people.

== Notable people born in Wamel ==
- Ivo Den Bieman (born 1967), footballer
- Bram van den Berg (born 1982), drummer
- Iris van Herpen (born 1984), fashion designer

== Gallery ==
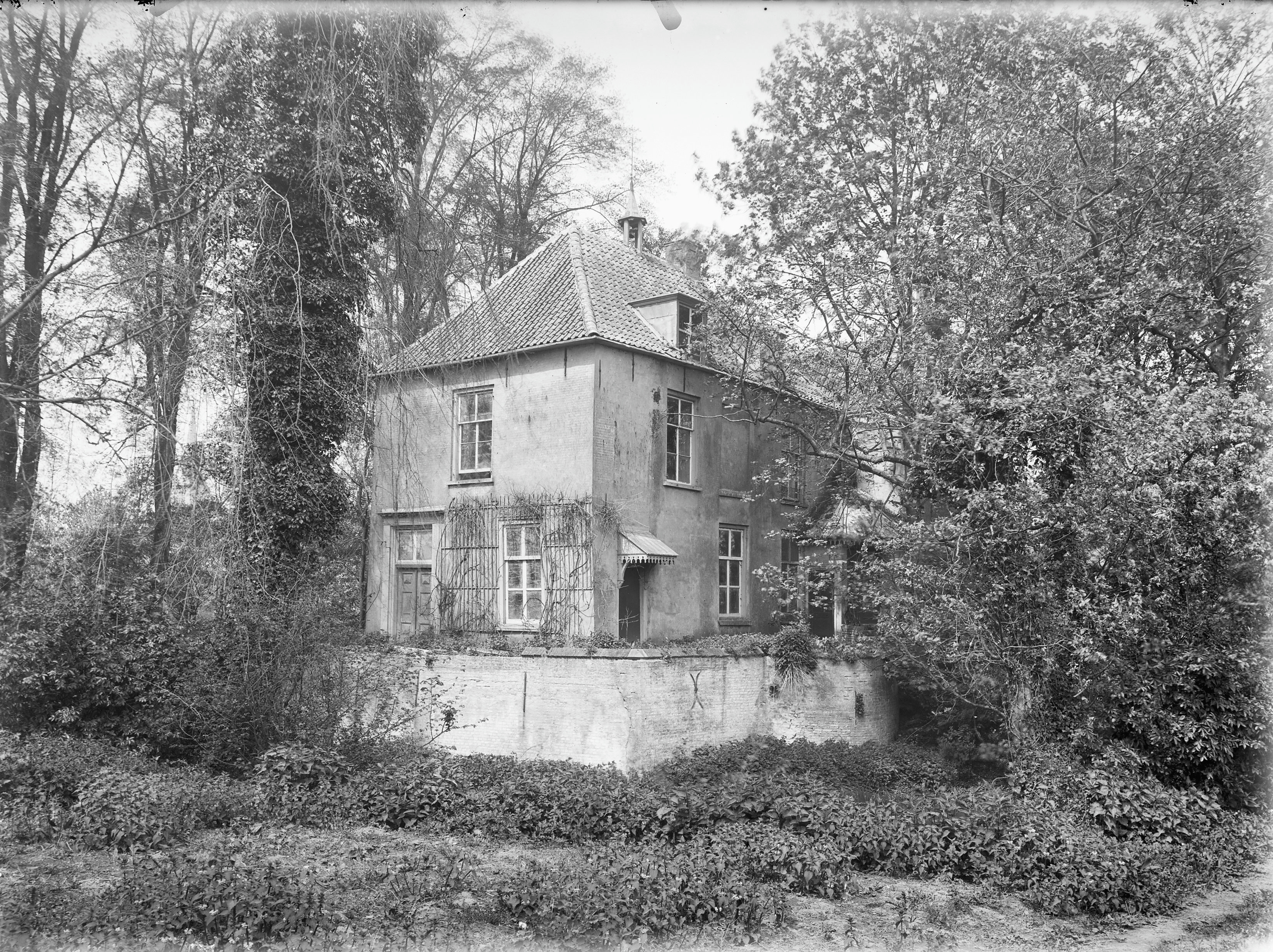
Huize Sterkenburg

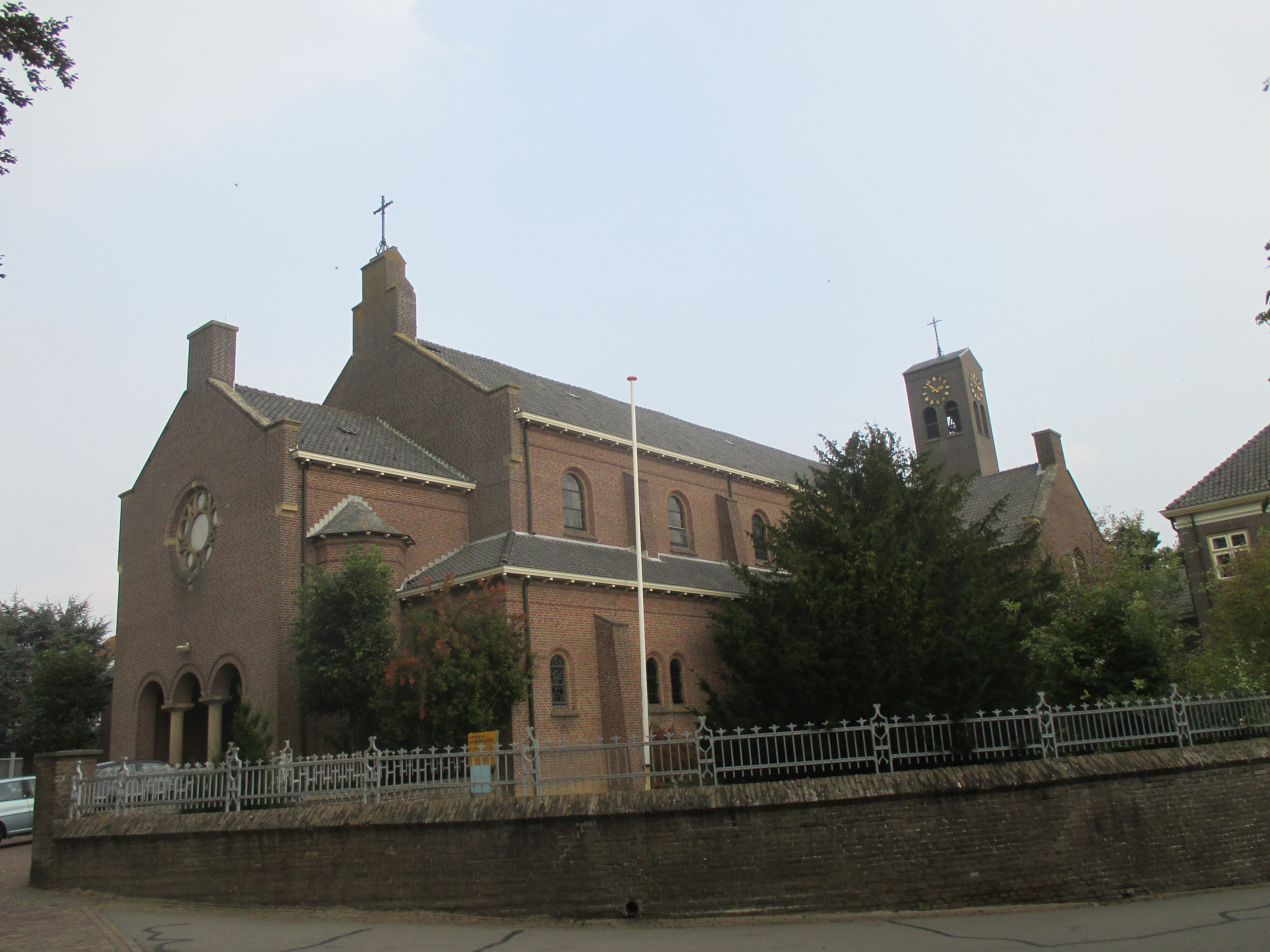
Saint Victor Church

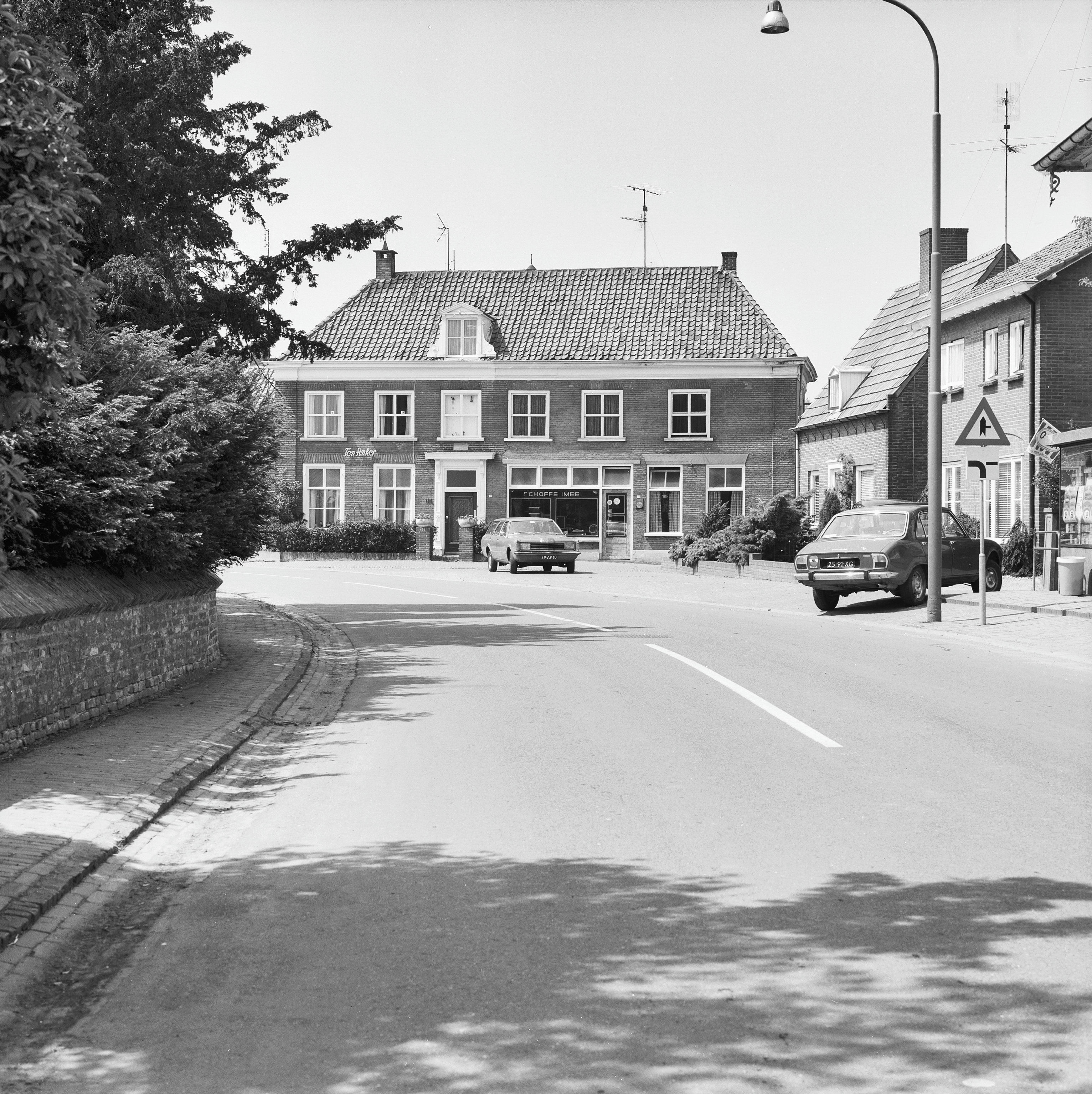
Street in Wamel
