= Homeless (Darin song) =

2006 song written by Jörgen Elofsson

Song by Darin

from the album Break the News
- Released: November 22, 2006
- Recorded: 2006
- Genre: R&B
- Length: 3:42
- Label: Sony BMG
- Songwriter(s): Jörgen Elofsson
- Producer(s): Steve Mac

"Homeless" is a song by Swedish singer-songwriter Darin from his studio album, Break the News (2006). The song was written by Swedish songwriter Jörgen Elofsson and produced by Steve Mac.

== Leona Lewis version ==
"Homeless"

Song by Leona Lewis

from the album Spirit
- Released: November 9, 2007
- Studio: AIR Studios (London, England); Rokstone Studios (London, England)
- Genre: R&B
- Length: 3:50
- Label: Sony BMG, J, Syco
- Songwriter(s): Jörgen Elofsson
- Producer(s): Steve Mac

Audio video
- "Homeless" on YouTube

"Homeless" was covered by British singer Leona Lewis in 2007 and was included on her debut album Spirit. The song garnered mixed reviews from music critics, some of whom praised Lewis's vocal performance but criticized its composition. Upon the release of Spirit, the song debuted at number 173 on the UK Singles Chart on the strength of digital download sales. Lewis performed "Homeless" at the annual WXKS-FM Boston KISS Concert in 2008, along with "Bleeding Love" and "Better in Time". It was also included on the set list of The Labyrinth tour in 2010.

== Composition ==
"Homeless"
A sample of "Homeless", with Lewis singing about waiting for her boyfriend to come home to where she is waiting for him, but feels homeless without him.

"Homeless" was written by Swedish songwriter Jörgen Elofsson, and produced by Steve Mac. It is an R&B power ballad, which lasts for a duration of three minutes and 50 seconds. The song was composed on common time in the key of B minor at 68 beats per minute. Instrumentation is provided by a piano and a guitar. Lewis's vocal range spans nearly two octaves from low note of A_{3} to the high note of B_{5}. The song's lyrics revolve around Lewis singing about waiting for her boyfriend to come home to where she is waiting for him, but feels homeless without his presence. The opening lyrics are "Wait here for you to call me/ For you to tell me that ev'rything's a big mistake." Nick Levine for Digital Spy described Lewis's vocals in the lyric "In this cold I'm walking aimless, feeling helpless" as "a tour de force of despair and misery".

== Critical reception ==
The song garnered mixed reviews from music critics. Matt O'Leary for Virgin Media complimented "Homeless" as well as "I Will Be", and wrote that when the emphasis is laid purely on the singer's vocals without too much "glossy production trappings", her "uniqueness is allowed to shine." Levine was critical of "Homeless" in general, but praised some of its compositional elements. Although he thought that the song was "almost unbearably bleak", Levine praised the long note which Lewis sustains during the bridge, and wrote that "the 12-second 'eeeeeeyeeaayaaaaay' that jump-starts the crescendo of 'Homeless' is one of the most dazzling pop moments of the year." Kitty Empire for The Guardian wrote, "Lewis' voice is impressively elastic throughout but lacks any grit or style. It is too perfect, jumping up ladders of notes on 'Homeless', never catching, never breaking."

== Live performances ==
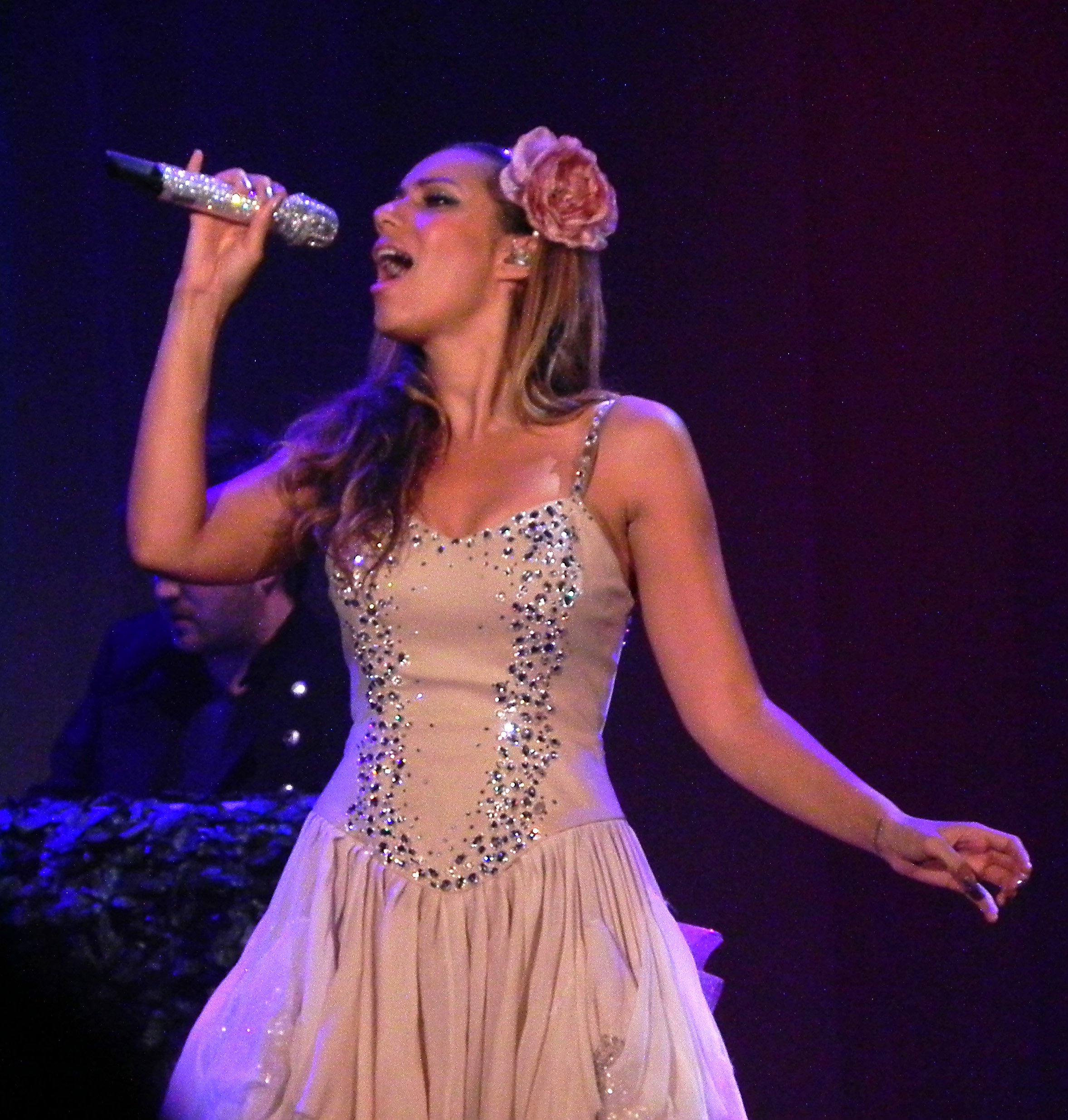
Lewis performing "Homeless" on The Labyrinth tour at Nottingham Arena on 2 June 2010.

Lewis performed "Homeless" for the first time at the annual WXKS-FM Boston KISS Concert in 2008, along with "Bleeding Love" and "Better in Time". It was also included on the set list of her The Labyrinth tour in 2010, and performed as the fifteenth song. The song was later included on The Labyrinth Tour Live from The O2 DVD. The set was decorated in the style of a forest; acrobats performed as they were hanging from the ceiling on large pieces of fabric while Lewis wore a light pink sequined dress and barefoot.

== Track listing ==
Standard version (2007)

3. "Homeless" – 3:50

Deluxe edition (2008)

3. "Homeless (2008 version)" – 3:50

The Labyrinth Tour: Live from the O2

14. "Homeless" (Live from the 02) – 4:09

== Credits ==
- Songwriting – Jörgen Elofsson
- Record producer – Steve Mac

Credits adapted from the liner notes of Spirit, Sony BMG, J Records, Syco.

== Charts ==
Upon the release of Spirit, "Homeless" debuted at number 173 on the strength of digital download sales in the chart issue released on 24 November 2007.

Chart (2007)	Peak position
UK Singles Chart (OCC)	173
