= Blinkar blå =

Single by Adolphson & Falk
- A-side: "Blinkar blå"
- B-side: "Rum för dig"
- Released: November/December 1981
- Genre: synthpop
- Length: 4.34 + 4.20

Adolphson & Falk singles chronology
"Astronaut"	"Blinkar blå"	"Bärande våg"

"Blinkar blå" ("Flashing Blue") was the breakthrough single for the Swedish synthpop band Adolphson & Falk when it was played in the Swedish radio show Eldorado in 1981. The single was their first synth-single (with Greg FitzPatrick controlling the synths).

== Original release 1981 ==
"Blinkar blå" was recorded on 4–5 November 1981 in Riksradions studio 7 in Stockholm. "Rum för dig" was an older acoustic song recorded in 1980 in KMH Studio.

=== Track listing ===
- "Blinkar blå" 4.34
- "Rum för dig" 4.20

== English version ==
The song was released in 1982 in an English version, "Flashing Blue".

=== Track listing ===
- "Flashing Blue"
- "Astronaut"

== Re-release ==
In 2006 an acoustic version of "Blinkar blå" was released.

== Charts ==
Chart (1982)	Peak position
Sweden (Sverigetopplistan)	4
