= Days Like This (Krezip album) =

Studio album by Krezip
- Released: October 16, 2002
- Recorded: 2001–2002
- Genres: Pop rock, rock
- Length: 39.24
- Label: Warner Music
- Producers: Bob Ludwig, Oscar Holleman

Krezip chronology
Nothing Less (2001)	Days Like This (2002)	What Are You Waiting For? (2005)

Days Like This is the second album from Dutch band Krezip. It peaked at No. 3 in the Dutch Mega Album Top 100.

== Production ==
After the tour for Krezip's debut album Nothing Less finished, lead singer Jacqueline Govaert suffered from writer's block, hindering the quick recording of a follow-up. Additionally, the band underwent a change in sound. During the aforementioned tour, Govaert had damaged her vocal cords and required surgery, after which the character of her voice changed. The band also went from a five-piece to a six-piece; guitarist Annelies Kuijsters had injured her hand during the tour and was unable to continue playing the guitar. The band decided she would continue by playing keyboards, and enlisted guitarist Thomas Holthuis to take the vacant guitar position.

== Track listing ==
All songs written by Jacqueline Govaert except where noted.

1. "You Can Say" (Govaert/Oscar Holleman) - 03:04
2. "Take It Baby" (Govaert/Holleman) - 03:10
3. "Gentle" - 03:27
4. "Promise" - 03:23
5. "What It Takes" - 02:57
6. "Days Like This" (Govaert/Holleman) - 03:27
7. "Don't You Feel Afraid" - 04:03
8. "For Sure" - 03:31
9. "Mine" (Govaert/Holleman) - 03:18
10. "There It Goes" - 02:50
11. "More Than This" - 03:17
12. "That'll Be Me" - 02:55
