= Steal My Melody =

Studio album by Markus Fagervall
- Released: 15 October 2008
- Genre: rock
- Producer: Patrik Berger, Elof Loelv, Kim Wennerström

Markus Fagervall chronology
Echo Heart (2006)	Steal My Melody (2008)

Steal My Melody is the second studio album by Swedish singer Markus Fagervall and was released on 15 October 2008.

== Track listing ==
1. Close But No Cigar
2. Sun In My Eyes
3. Can You Feel It
4. You Will Sing
5. Walls
6. She
7. Again
8. Killing Time
9. Undercover Superhero
10. If You Don't Mean It
11. Walking Away

== Personnel ==
- Markus Fagervall - singer
- Erik Zettervall - guitar
- Joel Lindberg - bass
- Johan Lundström - drums, percussion
- Joel Sjödin - piano, synthesizer, programming
- Patrik Berger - producer

== Charts ==
Chart (2008–2009)	Peak position
Swedish Albums (Sverigetopplistan)	11
