= Everything Changes (Markus Fagervall song) =

2006 single by Markus Fagervall

Single by Markus Fagervall

from the album Echo Heart
- Released: 2006
- Genre: Pop, rock
- Label: Sony BMG
- Songwriter: Jörgen Elofsson
- Producer: Peter Kvint

Markus Fagervall singles chronology
"Everything Changes" (2006)	"For Once" (2007)

"Everything Changes" is a Swedish English language single by Markus Fagervall, winner of the Swedish version of Idol in its third season in 2006. He sang the winning song when he was declared winner on 1 December 2006. The single went straight to number one on the Swedish Singles Chart on 7 December 2006 and stayed at that position for seven weeks, making it both the Swedish Christmas and the New Year number one. It was also certified platinum in Sweden, selling over 20,000 copies.

The song is a pop and rock song written by Jörgen Elofsson and produced by Peter Kvint. It was sung in the final by both Fagervall, runner-up Erik Segerstedt and third placed Johan Larsson. The song is also included on Fagervall's debut studio album, Echo Heart.

== Charts ==
=== Weekly charts ===
Chart (2006–2007)	Peak position
Sweden (Swedish Singles Chart)	1

=== Year-end charts ===
Chart (2006)	Position
Sweden (Sverigetopplistan)	3
Chart (2007)	Position
Sweden (Sverigetopplistan)	28
