= What Are You Waiting For? (Krezip album) =

Studio album by Krezip
- Released: 9 May 2005
- Recorded: 2003–2005
- Genre: Pop rock, rock
- Length: 44.29
- Label: Sony BMG
- Producer: Wizardz of Oz

Krezip chronology
Days Like This (2002)	What Are You Waiting For? (2005)	Plug It In (2007)

Professional ratings
Review scores
Source	Rating
Planet Internet	link

What Are You Waiting For is the third album of Dutch band Krezip. It is the first album released with their new label Sony BMG. The album peaked at #1 in the Dutch Mega Album Top 100.

== Album information ==
In 2004 Krezip lost their record label. This was because Warner Music BeNeLux had to drop out all their national artist. Very soon after the drop out Krezip got another record deal with Sony BMG, where this was their first release.

In addition to make the album, Jacqueline Govaert (singer of the band) flew to the United States to write for the album with several writers. The album is also produced in the U.S. with the famous producer-couple Wizardz of Oz (Andrew Bojanic and Liz Hooper), who also worked with artist like Avril Lavigne and Britney Spears. All the songs are written by Jacqueline Govaert with co-writers.

The song "Same Mistake" was used in the Dutch movie Schnitzel Paradise (Het Schnitzelparadijs) which became a huge hit in the Netherlands.

== Singles ==
- Out Of My Bed
- Don't Crush Me
- I Apologize

=== Singles charts ===
year	Title	NL position
2005	Out Of My Bed	9
2005	Don't Crush Me	23
2005	I Apologize	31

== Track listing ==
#	Title	Writer(s)	Time
1.	"What Are You Waiting For"	(Jacqueline Govaert, Elisabeth Hooper, Andrew Bojanic)	3.31
2.	"Out Of My Bed"	(Jacqueline Govaert, Phil Thornalley)	3.27
3.	"Don't Crush Me"	(Jacqueline Govaert, Gary Clark)	3.46
4.	"Brighter Days"	(Jacqueline Govaert)	3.37
5.	"Really Something"	(Jacqueline Govaert, Elisabeth Hooper, Andrew Bojanic, Leah Haywood)	2.50
6.	"Take Your Time"	(Jacqueline Govaert, Oscar Holleman)	3.05
7.	"I Apologize"	(Jacqueline Govaert, Elisabeth Hooper, Andrew Bojanic)	3.05
8.	"Where Are You Now"	(Jacqueline Govaert, Elisabeth Hooper, Andrew Bojanic)	3.22
9.	"Same Mistake"	(Jacqueline Govaert, Oscar Holleman)	3.30
10.	"Peace Of Mind"	(Jacqueline Govaert)	3.15
11.	"Same Old Story"	(Jacqueline Govaert)	3.42
12.	"Don't Want You"	(Jacqueline Govaert, Rick Neigher)	3.37
13.	"Forget What I Said"	(Jacqueline Govaert, Michelle Lewis)	3.37

== Charts ==
=== Weekly charts ===
Chart (2005)	Peak position
Belgian Albums (Ultratop Flanders)	14
Dutch Albums (Album Top 100)	1

=== Year-end charts ===
Chart (2005)	Position
Dutch Albums (Album Top 100)	52
