= Bram van den Berg =

Dutch drummer

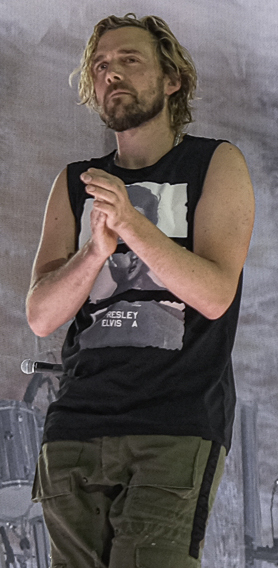
- Van den Berg in 2023 following a performance with U2 on their U2:UV Achtung Baby Live at Sphere residency

Background information
- Born: Bram van den Berg; September 29 1982; Wamel
- Genre: Rock
- Occupation: Musician
- Instruments: Drums; percussion
- Member of: Krezip

Bram van den Berg is a Dutch rock musician who is the drummer of the band Krezip. He served as the live drummer of Irish rock band U2 during their Las Vegas concert residency U2:UV Achtung Baby Live at Sphere from 2023 to 2024, filling in for Larry Mullen Jr., who was recovering from surgery.

Van den Berg was born in Wamel in 1982. He joined Krezip in 2004 and played with them until their 2009 breakup and since their reunion in 2019. In February 2023, Van den Berg was announced as the temporary drummer for U2 during their Sphere residency; he landed the job after meeting the band through their mutual acquaintance, Dutch DJ Martin Garrix. He began rehearsing with the group in early 2023, before performing with them for 40 concerts spanning September 2023 to March 2024.
