= Markus Fagervall =

Swedish singer (born 1982)

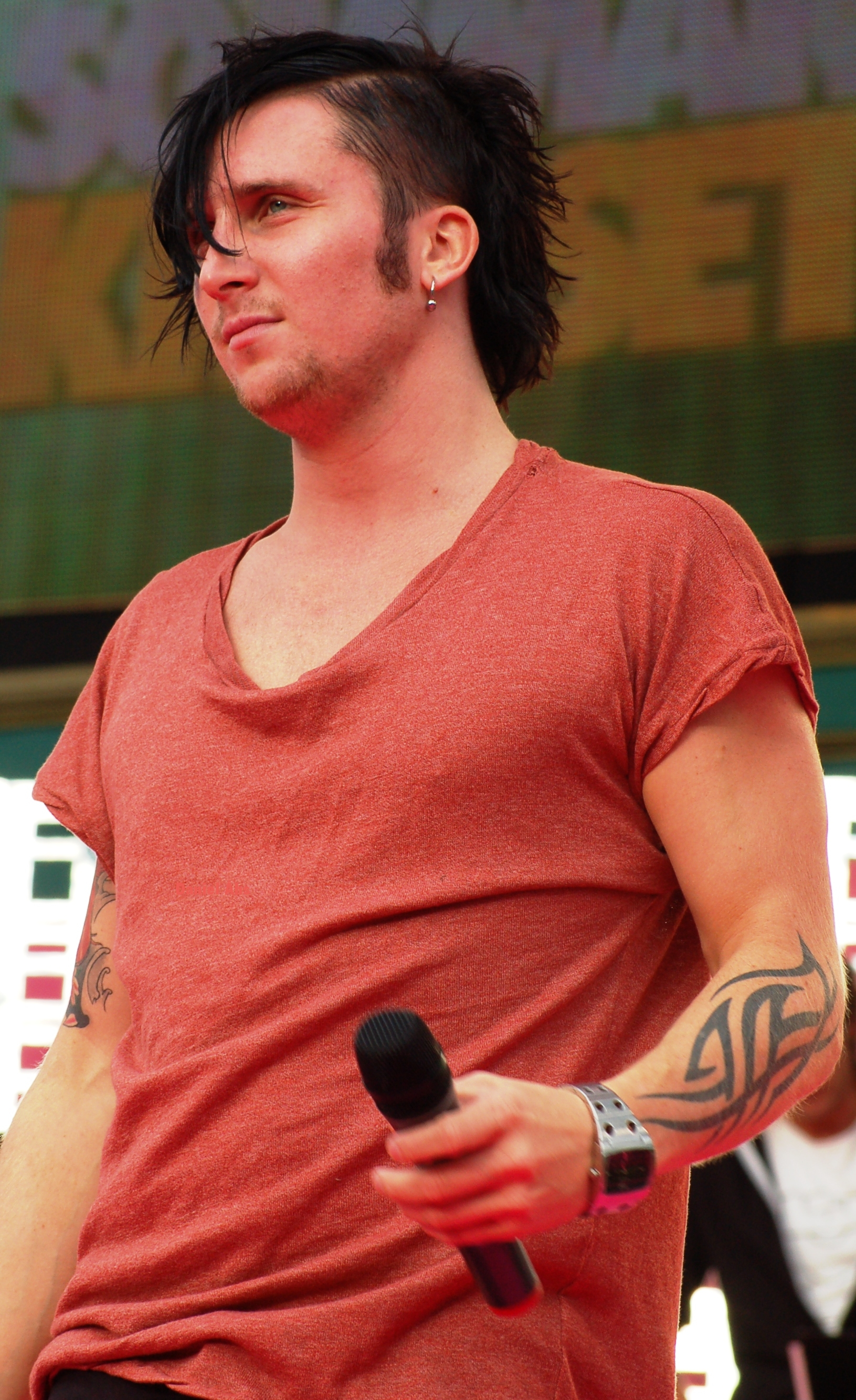

Background information
- Born: Markus Eino Fagervall; 5 October 1982 (age 44)
- Origin: Kiruna, Sweden
- Genres: Pop, Rock
- Occupation: Singer
- Instrument: Singing
- Years active: 2006–present
- Label: Sony BMG (2006–present)
- Website: markusfagervall.se

Markus Eino Fagervall (born 5 October 1982) won Idol 2006, the third season of the Swedish version of Pop Idol. Fagervall beat Erik Segerstedt on 1 December 2006 to take the title. His first single "Everything Changes" peaked at number one on the Swedish Singles Chart. His debut album, Echo Heart, was released on 18 December the same year and has to date been certified double platinum. Prior to winning Idol, Markus was the vocalist in the progressive rock band, Liquid Scarlet.

In 2008, Fagervall was a contestant in the Swedish version of Dancing on Ice, hosted by Carolina Gynning and Carina Berg.

== Early life ==
Fagervall was born in Kiruna to a Tornedalian father and a Finnish mother. He is fluent in both Finnish and Meänkieli.

== Discography ==
Markus Fagervall discography
- Studio albums: 2
- Singles: 3
- Music videos: 3
- B-sides: 2
- Other Charted Songs: 1
- Tours: 1

The following is a complete discography of every album and single released by Swedish Pop/Rock music artist Markus Fagervall.

=== Albums ===
| Year | Information | Sweden | Sales and Certifications |
|---|---|---|---|
| 2006 | Echo Heart: First studio album; Released: 14 December 2006; Label: Sony BMG; Format: CD | 1 | ^{Swedish sales: 81,000} IFPI: 2xPlatinum |
| 2008 | Steal My Melody: Second studio album; Released: 15 October 2008; Label: Sony BMG; Format: CD | 11 | ^{Swedish sales: 21,000} IFPI: Gold |

=== Singles ===
| Year | Song | Sweden | Certification | Album |
|---|---|---|---|---|
| 2006 | "Everything Changes" | 1 | Platinum (SWE) | Echo Heart |
| 2007 | "For Once" | — | — | Echo Heart |
| 2008 | "If You Don't Mean It" | 6 | — | Steal My Melody |

=== Other Charted Songs ===
| Year | Song | Sweden |
|---|---|---|
| 2006 | "She Will Be Loved" | 36 |

| Preceded by Agnes Carlsson | Idol winner Markus Fagervall (2006) | Succeeded by Marie Picasso |
