= Krezip =

Dutch pop rock band

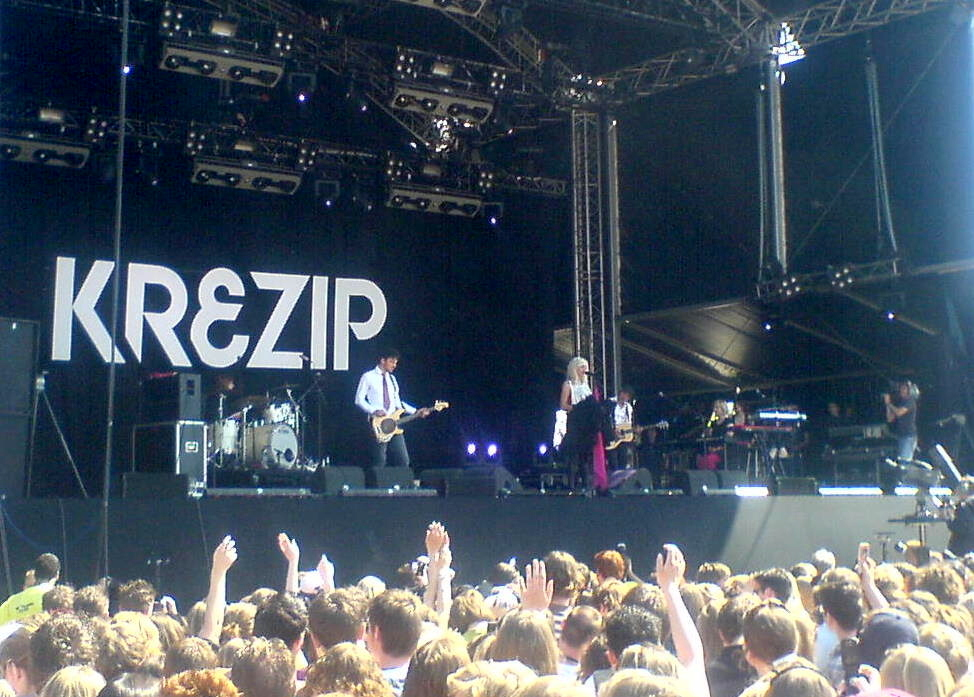
- Krezip on the Bevrijdingsfestival Overijssel 2008 in Zwolle.

Background information
- Origin: Tilburg, Netherlands
- Genres: Pop rock
- Years active: 1997–2009, 2019–present
- Labels: Warner Music Benelux (2000–2004); Sony/BMG (2004–present)
- Members: Jacqueline Govaert; Anne Govaert; Annelies Kuijsters; Joost van Haaren; Bram van den Berg; Jan Peter Hoekstra
- Past members: Thomas Holthuis; Thijs Romeijn
- Website: https://krezip.nl

Krezip is a Dutch pop rock band from Tilburg, North Brabant, formed in 1997. The band was formed while its members were in high school and has had four consistent core members, centered around lead singer and songwriter Jacqueline Govaert.

Signed to Warner Music, the band's breakout single "I Would Stay" was a number-one hit on the Dutch Top 40 and the third-biggest song of 2000. Their performance at the nationally-televised 2000 Pinkpop Festival, when Govaert was 18 years old, helped earn the band significant media attention.

In 2008, the band announced an imminent breakup. Their final single, "Sweet Goodbyes", reached number two on the Dutch Top 40 and was named the second-biggest song of 2009. Their final show took place on 27 June 2009 at the Heineken Music Hall in Amsterdam.

The band announced a reunion in 2019 to perform at Pinkpop and released the single "Lost Without You", their first in 10 years. In 2023 and 2024, Bram van den Berg served as U2's live drummer while Larry Mullen Jr. recovered from surgery.

== History ==
=== Formation and demos (1997–1999) ===
Krezip began as a four-piece outfit in 1997 in Tilburg, Netherlands, consisting of Jacqueline Govaert on vocals, Anne Govaert and Annelies Kuijsters on guitar and Joost van Haaren on bass guitar. Though these four formed the core of the band, they found it difficult to find a suitable permanent drummer. Thijs Romeijn eventually became the band's permanent drummer.

In 1998, Krezip, armed with two demo tapes, played many festivals in the Netherlands, such as Festival Mundial, Noorderslag, and Lowlands. Studies and age made obtaining commercial offers difficult. In 1999, they released an independent EP, Run Around.

=== Nothing Less (2000–2001) ===
The band soon received numerous offers from record companies. In 2000, they signed with Warner Music and recorded their first album, Nothing Less, with the producer Oscar Holleman. Their first single, "Won't Cry", did little to advance their career. The band gained more exposure after a show at the Dutch Pinkpop festival, with the ballad "I Would Stay" being received exceptionally well. The song was released as their second single, with a video compiled from footage of the Pinkpop show. "I Would Stay" reached number one on the Dutch Top 40.

Nothing Less entered the charts at #26 in the Netherlands and climbed to #1, going 3× platinum. Despite this, the two other singles from the album, "All Unsaid" and "Everything and More", failed to chart. Among others, Krezip received a 2001 Edison Award, the Dutch equivalent of the Grammy Awards.

The band toured continuously on the album, though towards the end of the tour, problems began to arise. Govaert began to lose her voice, while Kuijsters experienced severe pains in her hand that stopped her from playing shows without painkillers. After the tour, Govaert needed an operation on her vocal cords, while Kuijsters was diagnosed as simply not being "made" to play guitar.

=== Days Like This (2002–2003) ===
Despite a delay due to writer's block, the band released Days Like This in 2002. The album was certified gold (35,000 copies) later that year, and though the album was not as successful as its predecessor, it had several successful singles ("You Can Say" (#18), "Promise" (#16) and "Mine").

A club tour supported the album in the Netherlands, including acoustic performances in theaters. A performance for The Box TV program Pure was recorded live and released on DVD and CD called That'll Be Unplugged. The band liked the unplugged shows at first, but over time, decided to stay with rock music. Krezip also spent time promoting the album in Germany. They did two tours there and they were the supporting act for Bon Jovi in the Netherlands and supported Sheryl Crow during her tour of Germany and France.

Around this time Bram van den Berg replaced Thijs Romeijn on drums and Jan Peter Hoekstra replaced Thomas Holthuis on guitar.

=== Release from record label and What Are You Waiting For? (2004–2006) ===
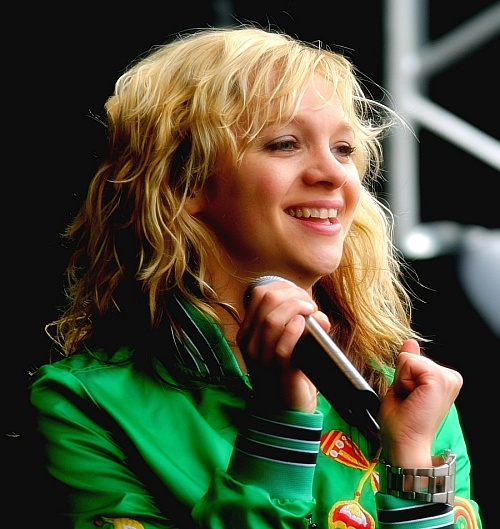
Singer Jacqueline Govaert in 2005

While the band wrote new songs, Warner Music forced Warner Music Benelux to drop all of its national artists, including Krezip.

After leaving Warner, Krezip received many offers from other record labels. After careful deliberation, they chose to sign with Sony BMG. In a speech during the 2004 TMF Awards, Krezip thanked their old label for everything that they had done. The band flew to Los Angeles to collaborate with the American producers Wizardz of Oz, writing most of their new album there.

On 9 May 2005, Krezip released What Are You Waiting For?. The album entered the Dutch Album Top 100 at #1 and stayed in the chart for 27 weeks. Three singles were released. "Out of My Bed" was first. It peaked at #9, making it Krezip's second top 10 hit. Two other singles, "Don't Crush Me" (#22) and the ballad "I Apologize" (#30), failed to make it into the top 20.

In early 2005, Krezip traveled to Ethiopia at the request of charity foundation Novib for an education campaign. The journey was recorded and shown on the Dutch version of MTV. The band also went on toured Benelux, selling out 15 big venues.

The song "Same Mistake" was used in the Dutch movie Het Schnitzelparadijs (Schnitzel Paradise), which became a huge hit in the Netherlands. The band later noted that "Same Mistake" is the only Krezip song that has never been played live.

In 2006, Jacqueline joined several artists in the Netherlands to record the anthem for the 2006 TMF Awards. The song was performed live during the award show. The single became available for download to support the foundation Dance 4 Life - it peaked at #4 on downloads alone.

=== Plug It In (2006–2007) ===
In 2007, the band teamed up with the Swedish producers Adel Dahdal and Peter Mansson to record a new album. The band deliberately chose a drastically different sound, with disco influences and more electronica, and hence teamed up with various songwriters such as Felix Rodriguez and Jesper Anderberg of The Sounds among others. The album was recorded in two weeks, and on 11 May 2007 Krezip released Plug It In. On 6 February 2007 a Dutch radio station (3FM) played a rough version of the first single, "Plug It In & Turn Me On". The song was officially released in April 2007 and entered the Dutch Top 40 at the #39. While on tour, Krezip performed at Pinkpop Festival for the fourth time, replacing Amy Winehouse. The second single, "Play This Game With Me", was released after this show, with its music video using footage of the Pinkpop show. The song failed to chart. The third single, "All My Life", put the band back into the top 10, peaking at #7.

=== Ten-year anniversary and break-up (2007–2009) ===
On 17 August 2007, Jacqueline announced on Giel Beelen's radio show that Krezip would give a special concert on 29 December 2007, in the Heineken Music Hall in Amsterdam to celebrate its tenth anniversary. A documentary was also filmed, showcasing the band's entire career until that point with narration by the band members. The band recorded a cover of The Korgis' song "Everybody's Got to Learn Sometime". The song was used in the film Alles is liefde. Later that year, the band re-released Plug It In with the track, a new song and a number of live tracks from the HMH concert. In 2008, Krezip's breakthrough single "I Would Stay" received a once-only, people's choice award for "All-time best Dutch single" from the Dutch national radio station 3FM.

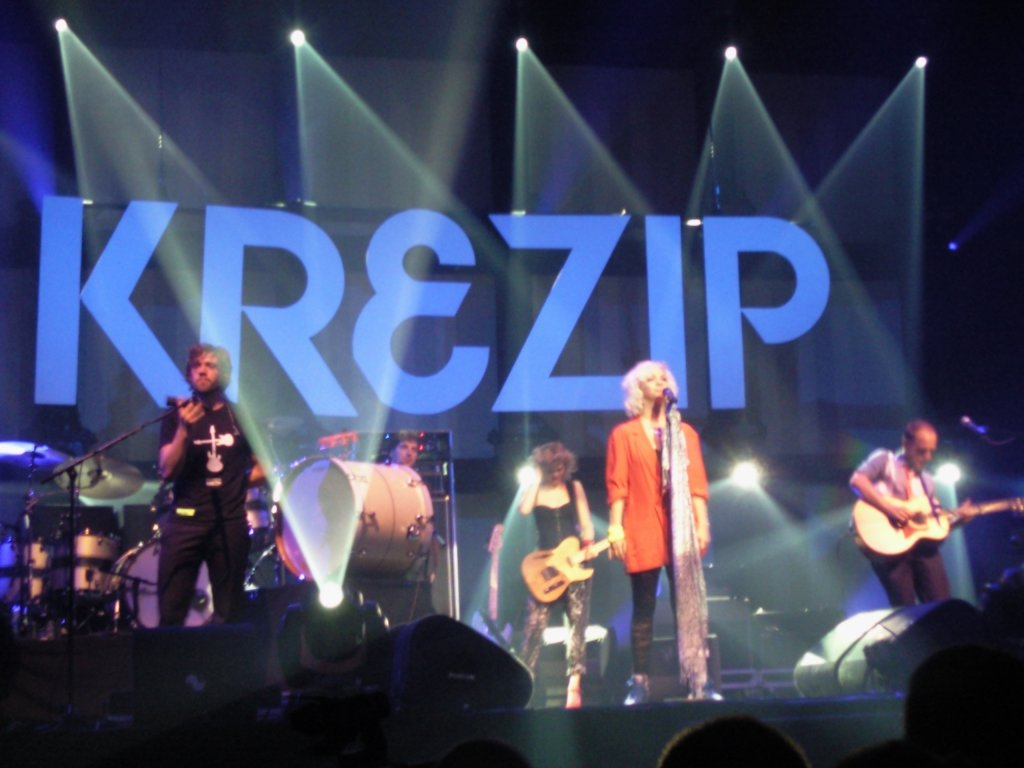
Krezip's farewell concert on 26 June 2009 at Heineken Music Hall

The band continued to tour, eventually announcing that a best-of compilation would be released in December 2008. It included three new tracks, of which "Go To Sleep" and "Sweet Goodbyes" were released as singles. Originally, it had been implied that the band thought this a good point to release a retrospective. On 2 October, however, the band announced in Giel Beelen's radio show that they had decided to break up. On the band's Hyves account, they explained that a good time for them to quit was when they were at their peak.

The band finished the tour and played two farewell concerts in the Heineken Music Hall. The last concert on 27 June 2009 was released on CD and DVD under the title Sweet Goodbyes.

=== Reunion and Sweet High (2019) ===
On 28 January 2019, news broke that Krezip would return to the stage for Pinkpop 2019. On 29 January 2019 they premiered their single "Lost Without You" on the Dutch TV show De Wereld Draait Door. On 8 June 2019 they released the follow-up single "How Would You Feel". On 24 October 2019 Krezip released the album Sweet High.

The band's comeback started after drummer Bram van den Berg saw a 40-year Pinkpop compilation CD. During a dinner with the other band members, he suggested making new music, and while the rest of the band initially laughed, it led ultimately to the reunion.

=== Any Day Now (2023) ===
On 24 January 2023, the band announced that they will release their sixth studio album Any Day Now on 7 April. The album includes the singles "Make it a Memory" featuring Danny Vera, and "Ready For More".

On February 12, it was announced that drummer Bram van den Berg will fill in for drummer Larry Mullen Jr. of Irish band U2 on their U2:UV Achtung Baby Live residency at the Sphere in Las Vegas, which started in late 2023, as Mullen Jr. faces recovery from surgery.

=== Music For Máxima (2024) ===
In 2024, Govaert succeeded Jan Smit as a Eurovision Song Contest commentator.

On May 17, 2024, the seventh studio album Music For Máxima was released.

== Members ==
- Jacqueline Govaert – lead vocals, piano (1997–2009, 2019–present)
- Annelies Kuijsters – guitar (1997–2001), keyboards, synths (2001–2009, 2019–present), backing vocals (1997–2009, 2019–present)
- Anne Govaert – guitar, backing vocals (1997–2009, 2019–present)
- Joost van Haren – bass (1997–2009, 2019–present)
- Jan Peter Hoekstra – guitar, backing vocals (2004–2009, 2019–present)
- Bram van den Berg – drums (2005–2009, 2019–present)

=== Former members ===
- Thomas Holthuis – guitar (2001–2003)
- Thijs Romeijn – drums (1997–2004)

== Discography ==
=== Albums ===
==== Studio albums ====
Title	Details	Peak chart positions		Certifications
Title	Details	NL	BEL (FLA)	Certifications
Run Around	Released: 1998	—	—	
Nothing Less	Released: 5 May 2000; Label: Warner Music	1	1	NVPI: 3× Platinum; BEL: Gold
Days Like This	Released: 18 October 2002; Label: Warner Music	1	13	NVPI: Gold
What Are You Waiting For?	Released: 9 May 2005; Label: Sony BMG	1	14	
Plug It In	Released: 11 May 2007; Label: Sony BMG	3	40	NVPI: Gold
Sweet High	Released: 24 October 2019; Label: Pink Harvest/Friendly Fire	2	—	NVPI: Gold
Any Day Now	Released: 7 April 2023; Label: Pink Harvest/Friendly Fire	4	—	
"—" denotes items which were not released in that country or failed to chart.

==== Compilation albums ====
Title	Details	Peak chart positions	Certifications
Title	Details	NL	Certifications
Best of Krezip	Released: 10 November 2008; Label: Sony BMG	1	NVPI: 3× Platinum

==== Live albums ====
Title	Details	Peak chart positions
Title	Details	NL
Sweet Goodbyes	Released: 10 August 2009; Label: Sony BMG	2

=== Video albums ===
Title	Details
That'll Be Unplugged (And More)	Released: 2003; Label: Sony BMG

=== Singles ===
Title	Year	Peak chart positions			Certifications	Album
Title	Year	NL Top 40	NL Top 100	BEL (FLA)	Certifications	Album
"Won't Cry"	2000	—	66	—		Nothing Less
"I Would Stay"	2000	1	2	1	NVPI: Platinum; BEL: Platinum	Nothing Less
"All Unsaid"	2000	— (Note: "All Unsaid" did not enter the Dutch Top 40, but peaked at number two on the Tipparade chart, which acts as an extension to the Top 40.)	64	— (Note: "All Unsaid" did not enter the Ultratop 50, but peaked at number eight on the Ultratip chart, which acts as an extension to the Ultratop 50.)		Nothing Less
"Everything and More"	2001	— (Note: "Everything And More" did not enter the Dutch Top 40, but peaked at number five on the Tipparade chart, which acts as an extension to the Top 40.)	65	— (Note: "Everything And More" did not enter the Ultratop 50, but peaked at number 11 on the Ultratip chart, which acts as an extension to the Ultratop 50.)		Nothing Less
"You Can Say"	2002	18	19	— (Note: "You Can Say" did not enter the Ultratop 50, but peaked at number seven on the Ultratip chart, which acts as an extension to the Ultratop 50.)		Days Like This
"Promise"	2002	16	26	— (Note: "Promise" did not enter the Ultratop 50, but peaked at number 11 on the Ultratip chart, which acts as an extension to the Ultratop 50.)		Days Like This
"Mine (Acoustic)"	2003	— (Note: "Everything And More" did not enter the Dutch Top 40, but peaked at number 18 on the Tipparade chart, which acts as an extension to the Top 40.)	99	—		Non-album singles
"All I'm Asking for"	2004	—	—	—		Non-album singles
"Out of My Bed"	2005	9	5	— (Note: "Out of My Bed" did not enter the Ultratop 50, but peaked at number five on the Ultratip chart, which acts as an extension to the Ultratop 50.)		What Are You Waiting For?
"Don't Crush Me"	2005	22	27	— (Note: "Don't Crush Me" did not enter the Ultratop 50, but peaked at number six on the Ultratip chart, which acts as an extension to the Ultratop 50.)		What Are You Waiting For?
"I Apologize"	2005	30	29	—		What Are You Waiting For?
"Plug It In & Turn Me On"	2007	21	19	— (Note: "Plug It In & Turn Me On" did not enter the Ultratop 50, but peaked at number four on the Ultratip chart, which acts as an extension to the Ultratop 50.)		Plug It In
"Play This Game With Me"	2007	— (Note: "Play This Game With Me" did not enter the Dutch Top 40, but peaked at number two on the Tipparade chart, which acts as an extension to the Top 40.)	77	—		Plug It In
"All My Life"	2007	7	7	—		Plug It In
"Everybody's Gotta Learn Sometime"	2008	23	32	—		Alles is liefde
"Go to Sleep"	2008	24	48	—		Best of Krezip
"Sweet Goodbyes"	2009	2	2	—	NVPI: Gold	Best of Krezip
"Lost Without You"	2019	8	33	— (Note: "Lost Without You" did not enter the Ultratop 50, but peaked at number 35 on the Ultratip chart, which acts as an extension to the Ultratop 50.)	NVPI: Platinum	Sweet High
"How Would You Feel"	2019	27	85	— (Note: "How Would You Feel" did not enter the Ultratop 50, but peaked at number 17 on the Ultratip chart, which acts as an extension to the Ultratop 50.)		Sweet High
"Come Back with Me Now"	2019	—	—	—		Sweet High
"You Are Not Alone"	2021	20	39	—		TBA
"Seventeen"	2021	—	—	— (Note: "Seventeen" did not enter the Ultratop 50, but peaked at number 30 on the Ultratip chart, which acts as an extension to the Ultratop 50.)		TBA
"Make It a Memory" (with Danny Vera)	2022	31	65	—		Any Day Now
"It All Means Nothing (You're Not Here Now)" (with Danny Vera)	2024	19	49	—		
"—" denotes items which were not released in that country or failed to chart.
