= Julen är här (song) =

Song by Tommy Körberg and Sissel Kyrkjebø

from the album Julen är här
- Language: Swedish
- Released: 1989
- Genre: Christmas, pop, schlager
- Label: Little Big Apple
- Songwriters: Billy Butt; Sölve Rydell

"Julen är här" is a Christmas song written by Billy Butt and Sölve Rydell, and intended to be sung as a duet. A famous recording was done by Tommy Körberg with Sissel Kyrkjebø on the 1989 Tommy Körberg Christmas album Julen är här. This version charted at Svensktoppen for four weeks over Christmas-New Year 1989–1990.

Song lyrics describe Christmas in the Nordic region. By 2000, the song had been popular not only at Christmas albums and concerts, but also at school during the ceremonies when the school classes break up before the Christmas vacation.

In 1994, it was recorded by Jenny Öhlund on her Christmas album Mitt julkort.

In 1997, it was recorded by Jessica Johansson on the Christmas EP Vintertid.

In 2001, Jan Malmsjö recorded the song on his Christmas album Välkommen till min jul and he also performed it during uppesittarkväll at Bingolotto on 23 December 2001, together with a nine-year-old girl.

In 2002, Christer Sjögren and Charlotte Nilsson recorded the song, releasing it as a single.

In 2006, Anders and Karin Glenmark recorded the song on the Christmas album Vår jul.

In 2008, the song was recorded by Amy Diamond on the Christmas album En helt ny jul.

In 2010, the song was recorded by Christer Sjögren and Elisabeth Andreassen on the Christmas album En stjärna lyser i natt.

In 2013, the song was recorded by Elize Ryd and Tony Kakko in Swedish for the Finnish metal Christmas album Raskasta Joulua, and in 2014 in English for the English version of the album, Ragnarok Juletide.

The song was written in late summer 1989. In English, it is called "Christmas is here".

== Charts ==
Chart (2017)	Peak position
Sweden (Sverigetopplistan)	6
