= Johan Palm =

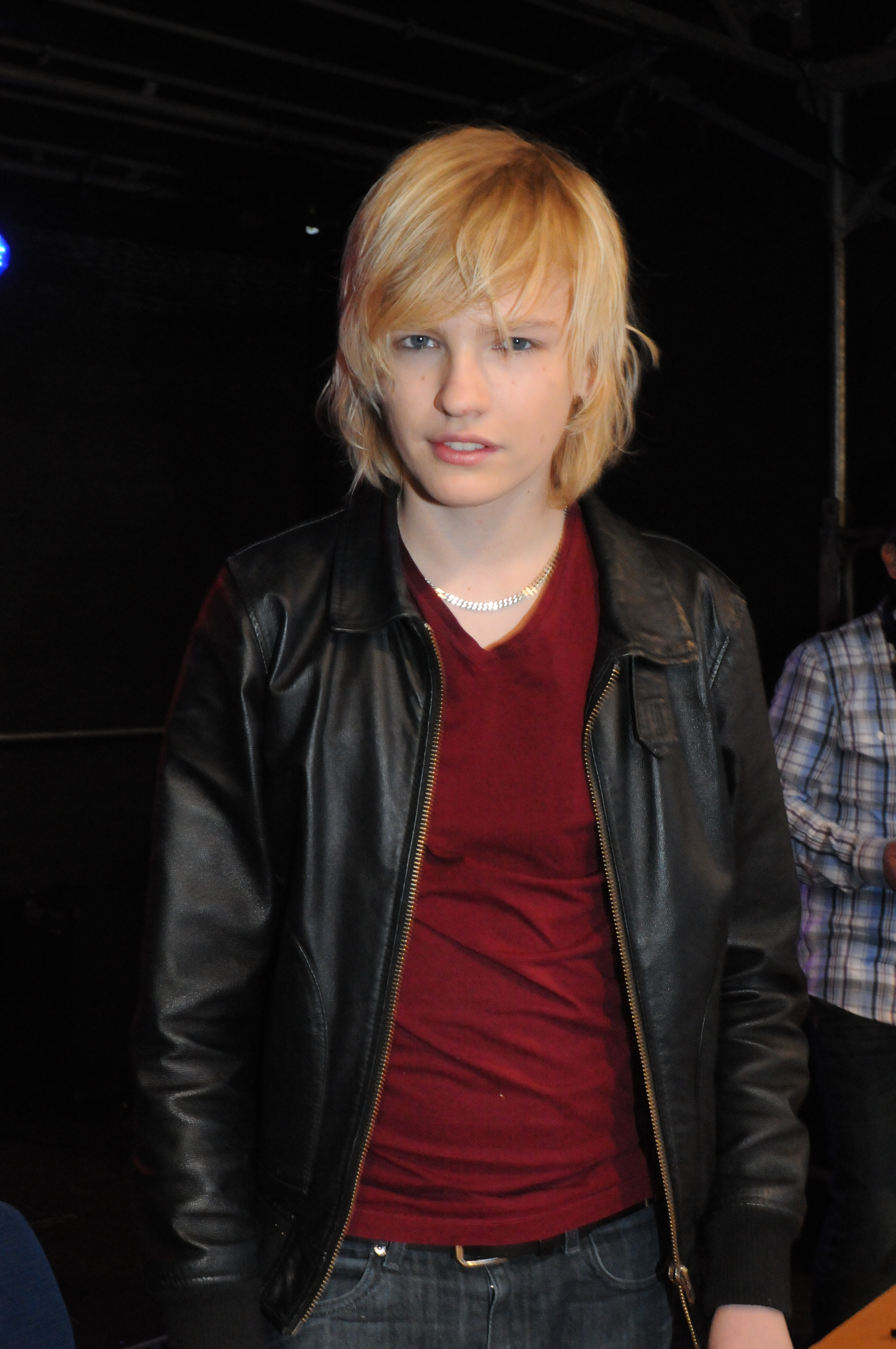
- Johan Palm

Background information
- Born: Karl Johan Viktor Palm; 3 March 1992 (age 34)
- Origin: Mjölby, Sweden
- Genres: Rock, Pop
- Occupation: Singer
- Instruments: Vocals, guitar, bagpipes
- Years active: 2008–present
- Label: Sony BMG (2009–)

Karl Johan Viktor Palm (born 3 March 1992) is a Swedish singer and former contestant on Idol 2008, where he ended up in fourth place. Palm auditioned with the song "The Drugs Don't Work" and performed several English songs on the show, including "Friday I'm in Love" by the Cure, "Poison" by Alice Cooper, "Beautiful Ones" by Suede, "Don't Look Back in Anger" by Oasis and "The Winner Takes It All" by ABBA. He also performed a special edition of "We Built This City" with Robin Eriksson.

In 2009, he hit number one on the Swedish Singles Chart with the song "Emma-Lee".

== Discography ==
=== Albums ===
Released	Album	Sweden
2009	My Antidote	1

=== Singles ===
Released	Single	Sweden	Album
2009	"Emma-Lee"	1	My Antidote
2009	"All the Time in the World"	-	My Antidote

=== Collaborations ===
In (April 2010) Palm appears in the video "Generation Wild" from the Swedish band "CRASHDÏET".

Johan Palm appears in the video "Night Vision" from the Swedish band "Cinemascape", in (March 2012), The video was directed by his brother "Henrik Palm". A year before Johan was part of the tribute Album to NOICE that Grizzly and Micael finished,"Bedårande barn av vår tid" just days before Micael died, in May 2011. The song in which Johan Palm participated is Du lever bara en gång (You only live once in English).
