= Julen är här (album) =

Studio album by Tommy Körberg
- Released: 1989
- Genre: Christmas

Tommy Körberg chronology
är (1988)	Julen är här (1989)	Livslevande (1990)

Julen är här is a 1989 Christmas album by Tommy Körberg.

== Track listing ==
=== Side A ===
1. Julen är här - (duet with Sissel Kyrkjebø)
2. Gläns över sjö och strand
3. Klang, min vackra bjällra
4. Ser du stjärnan i det blå (When You Wish upon a Star)
5. Minns du hans ögon
6. Julpolska (Julen den glada går åter omkring på Jorden) with Orsa spelmän

=== Side B ===
1. O helga natt (Cantique de Noël) (Minuit, Chrétiens)
2. Himlens hemlighet (Mary's Boy Child)
3. Sång till Karl-Bertil Jonsson, 14 år
4. Jul, jul, strålande jul
5. Låt julen förkunna (Happy Xmas (War Is Over) - with Sissel Kyrkjebø.
6. Frälsarbarn

== Chart positions ==
Chart (2024–2025)	Peak position
Swedish Albums (Sverigetopplistan)	1
