= Jacqueline Govaert =

Dutch singer, songwriter, and pianist

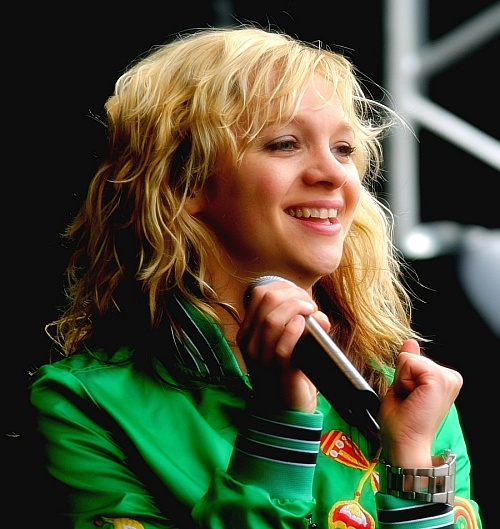
- Govaert in 2005 performing at Krezip concert in Zwolle.

Background information
- Born: 20 April 1982 (age 44); Kaatsheuvel, Netherlands
- Genres: Pop rock, alternative rock, pop punk, dance-rock
- Occupations: Singer, songwriter, pianist
- Instruments: Vocals, piano, guitar
- Years active: 1997–present
- Label: Sony/BMG
- Website: JacquelineGovaert.nl

Jacqueline Govaert (Dutch pronunciation: [ʑɑkəˈliŋ ˈɣoːvaːrt]; (Note: In isolation, Jacqueline is pronounced [ʑɑkəˈlin].) born 20 April 1982) is a Dutch singer, songwriter, and pianist. She is best known as the leader of Dutch band Krezip. After Krezip disbanded in 2009, Govaert started a solo music career. She released her debut album Good Life in August 2010.

== Career ==
=== Krezip ===
Govaert wrote her first songs on the piano at age 12. She graduated from the Dutch Rockacademy in Tilburg. Prior to that, she had started the band Krezip in high school. The band released their first EP in 1999; it was an independent release. In 2000, the band was signed by Warner Music and played at Lowlands and Pinkpop. In the same year their first LP came out, gaining considerable success that continued until they disbanded in 2009.

Govaert was the band's main songwriter. She was also the band's pianist until guitarist Annelies Kuijsters was forced to take over this role, having lost her ability to play guitar after a severe injury. Govaert enjoyed giving up her role as pianist, noting "...now I can concentrate on my performance."

Govaert served as a featured artist on tracks of the music project Ayreon, Dutch band Relax (on the album Odeur de Clochard), Armin van Buuren and Fernando Lameirinhas.

In 2006, Govaert contributed on a theme song for the TMF Awards of 2006. For this song, she collaborated with Dutch bands The Partysquad, Extince and Caprice. They performed the song at the opening of the award ceremony.

Govaert also co-wrote, with singer Alain Clark, the song "Wherever I Go", which was used in the Dutch Senseo commercial and then released as a single.

In 2019, Krezip reunited and performed at Pinkpop. At first, Krezip reunited only with the intention to play at Pinkpop and to do a reunion concert. However, they have since kept touring and have released two albums: Sweet High (2019) and Any Day Now (2023).

=== Solo career ===
After quitting Krezip, Govaert announced that she would be pursuing a solo music career. She released her debut solo album, Good Life, in August 2010. She worked on the album with Jan Peter Hoekstra (guitar Krezip), Joost Zweegers (Novastar), Tjeerd Bomhof (frontman Voicst) and Alex Callier (bass and songwriter Hooverphonic). Musicians on Good Life were Mario Goossens (drums Hooverphonic, Triggerfinger), Simon Casier (bass Balthazar), Jan Peter Hoekstra (guitar ex-Krezip) and Remko Kühne (keys Hooverphonic, Alain Clark). The album entered the Dutch Album Charts on 3 September 2010 at number three.

=== Other activities ===
In August 2023, she was named one of the members of the selection committee for the Dutch entry to the Eurovision Song Contest 2024. Following this, she was chosen as the Dutch commentator for the contest alongside Cornald Maas, replacing Jan Smit.

== Personal life ==
Govaert resides in Haarlem with her partner. On 29 October 2008, Govaert announced that she was expecting a child, and that she was taking a hiatus from the music industry. Govaert gave birth to a son, on 26 March 2009. Govaert's second child, a daughter, was born on 10 November 2010. Jacqueline is the older sister of Onno Govaert, who is a drummer mainly active in the field of improvised music.

== Discography ==
=== Albums with Krezip ===
- Run Around (1999)
- Nothing Less (2000)
- Days Like This (2002)
- That'll Be Unplugged (2003)
- What Are You Waiting For? (2005)
- Plug It In (2007)
- Best Of (2008)
- Sweet High (2019)
- Any Day Now (2023)

=== Solo albums ===
Year	Album details
2010	Good Life: Released: 26 August 2010; Label: Sony BMG; Format: CD, digital download
2014	Songs to Soothe: Released: 2014; Label: Format: CD, digital download
2017	Lighthearted Years: Released: 20 October 2017; Label: Universal Music Group; Format: CD, digital download

=== Chart positions ===
==== Albums ====
Album title	Release date	Charting in the Dutch Album Top 100			Comments
Album title	Release date	Date of entry	Highest	Weeks	Comments
Good Life	30-08-2010	04-09-2010	3	24	
Songs to Soothe	24-03-2014	29-03-2014	1	19	
Lighthearted Years	20-10-2017	28-10-2017	9		

==== Singles ====
Single title	Release date	Charting in the Dutch Top 40			Comments
Single title	Release date	Date of entry	Highest	Weeks	Comments
"Abraça-Me" / "Omhels me dan"	2006	-			with Fernando Lameirinhas / #35 in Single Top 100
"TMF Awards Anthem 2006"	2006	16-12-2006	tip8	-	with Partysquad, Extince, Caprice / #4 in de Single Top 100
"Never Say Never"	2009	11-07-2009	21	6	with Armin van Buuren / #32 in Single Top 100
"Overrated"	12-07-2010	17-07-2010	12	11	#28 in Single Top 100
"Big World"	2010	27-11-2010	29	5	
"Hold Your Fire"	2011	19-02-2011	tip11	-	
"Wherever I Go"	2011	09-04-2011	tip2	-	with Alain Clark / #33 in Single Top 100

=== Guest appearances ===
- Universal Migrator Part 1: The Dream Sequencer (Ayreon, 2000) "Temple Of The Cat"
- 76 (Armin van Buuren, 2003) "Stay"
- Odeur de Clochard (Relax, 2005) "Dream On"
- Just Like You (SMD, 2008)
- Imagine (Armin van Buuren, 2008) "Never Say Never"
