= Neverstore =

Swedish punk rock band

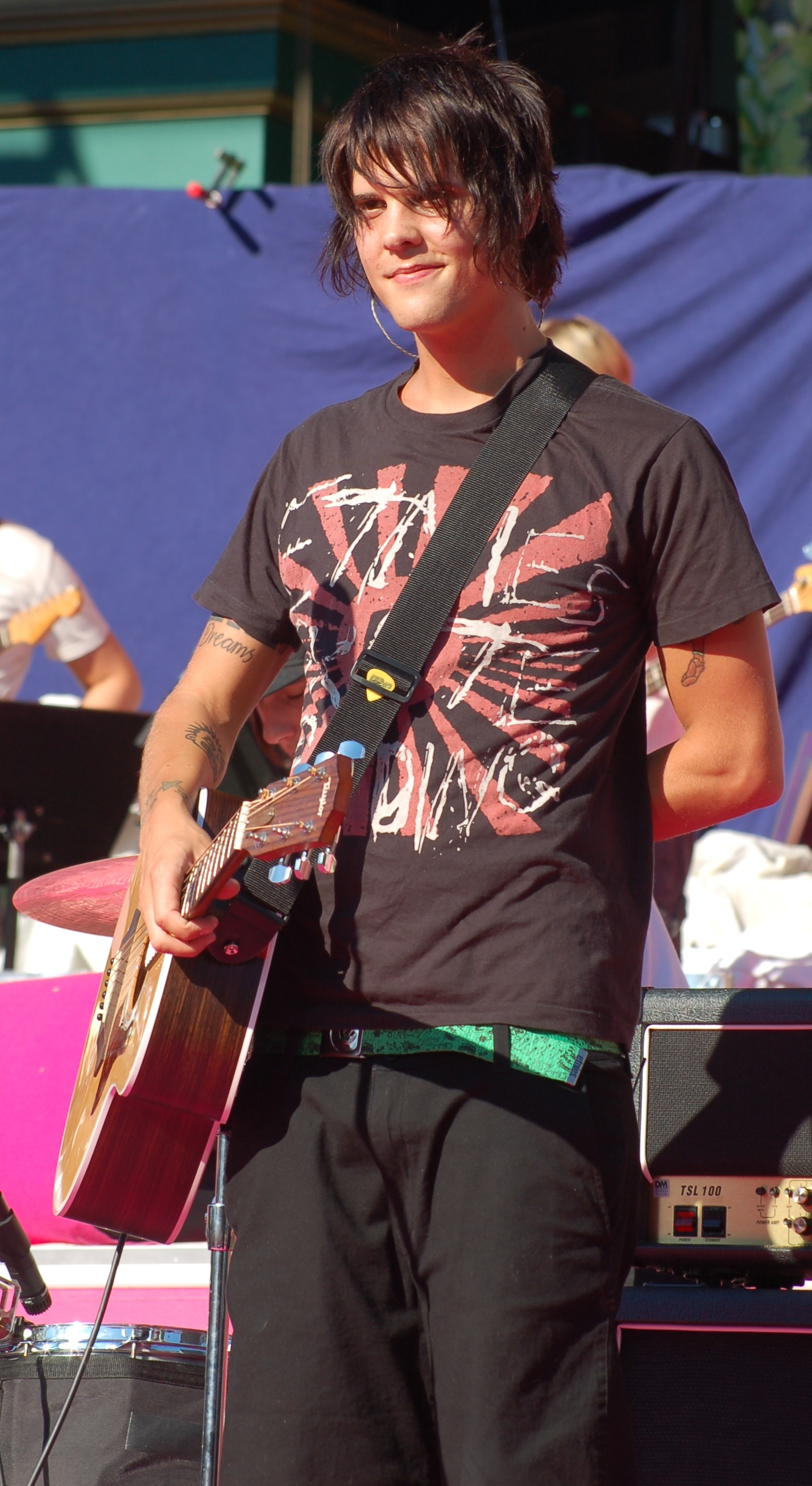
- Jacob Widén

Background information
- Origin: Skövde, Sweden
- Genres: Pop punk, punk rock, skate punk
- Years active: 2000–present
- Labels: Epic
- Members: Jacob Widén; Oscar Kempe; Erik Lantz
- Website: neverstore.com

Neverstore is a Swedish punk rock band. The band was formed in 2000 in Skövde. Neverstore released their first album, Sevenhundred Sundays 24 January 2007. The songs So Much of Not Enough and L.Y.D. (Live Your Dreams) were included on the album. Shortly after they released a new single, "Stay Forever". Neverstore have several times opened up for Backyard Babies and in May 2007 they opened up for Good Charlotte while on tour in Sweden. During 2008 Neverstore were on tour in Japan with the Canadian rock band Sum 41. This tour gave Neverstore a large audience in Japan. Neverstore's second studio album was released on 27 February 2008. This album is called Heroes Wanted. The band has recently been in Los Angeles, for recording of the new single Summer which is produced by Deryck Whibley from Sum 41. In the end of January 2010 the third album, Age of Hysteria was released. It contains the singles "Summer" and "Shallow Beautiful People". Neverstore is now busy making new songs for their new album. They expect it to be finished after summer holidays.

== Discography ==
- 2007: Sevenhundred Sundays
- 2008: Heroes Wanted
- 2010: Age of Hysteria
- 2013: Neverstore
