= Desire (Darin song) =

Single by Darin

from the album Break the News
- B-side: "What If I Kissed You Now"
- Released: 7 May 2007 (Sweden); 7 December 2007 (Germany)
- Recorded: 2006
- Genre: Electropop
- Length: 3:07
- Label: Sony BMG, EMI
- Songwriter(s): Darin Zanyar, Peter Mansson, Patric Sarin.

Darin singles chronology
"Everything But the Girl" (2007)	"Desire" (2007)	"Breathing Your Love" (2008)

Darin German singles chronology
"Insanity" (2007)	"Desire" (2007)	"So Yours" (2013)

Digital single cover

"Desire" is a song by Swedish singer Darin. It was released as the third single from Darin's third studio album Break the News in Sweden on 7 May 2007. In Germany, the song released as the album's second single on 7 December 2007.

== Formats and track listings ==
Digital download (iTunes)

1. "Desire" – 3:07

Enhanced CD maxi single

1. "Desire" – 3:07
2. "Desire" (Radio Edit) – 3:07
3. "Desire" (Instrumental) – 3:07
4. "What If I Kissed You Now" – 3:27

Bonus Videos

1. "Desire" – 3:09
2. "Desire" (Live in Cologne 25/09/2007) – 3:40

== Charts ==
Chart (2007–08)	Peak position
Germany (GfK)	53
