= Adolphson & Falk =

Swedish band

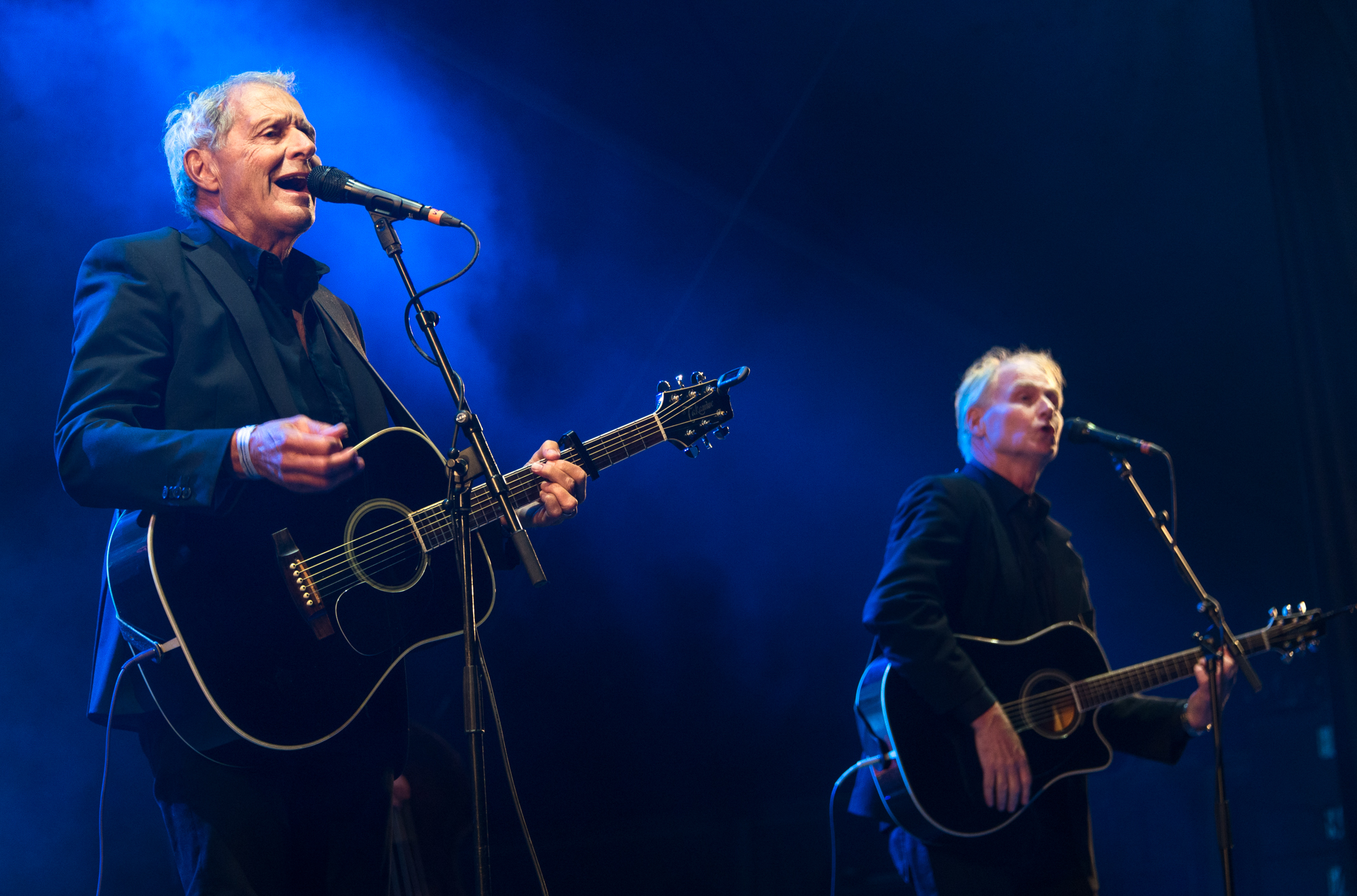
Adolphson & Falk in 2019

Adolphson & Falk is a Swedish synth-pop band, fronted by Tomas Adolphson (music, vocals) and Anders Falk (lyrics, music, vocals). Greg Fitzpatrick (keyboard) and Dagge Lundquist (mixing) were of importance for the successful electronical sound.

Tomas Adolphson and Anders Falk met while completing their compulsory national service in 1968 and started their collaboration. In the 1970s they released a handful of singles and the album Nattexpressen and participated in Melodifestivalen 1979. The breakthrough was when the single "Blinkar blå" ("Flashing Blue") was played in the Swedish radio show Eldorado in 1981. The single was followed by the album Med rymden i blodet (With space in my/the blood). The single "Mer jul" ("More Christmas"), with its self-deprecating lyrics about Christmas obsession and with sampling from Kalle Anka och hans vänner önskar God Jul (From All of Us to All of You), entered the charts in 1984 and in 2013 is still the most popular Swedish language Christmas song on Swedish radio.

The theme of the lyrics on Med rymden i blodet was mostly radio engineering, astronomy and how man is related to cosmos. Over the years the theme has shifted from one of technology/natural science to a more colloquial one.

== Discography ==
=== Albums ===
- Nattexpressen (1978)
- Med rymden i blodet (1982)
- From Here to Eternity (English version of Med rymden…,1983)
- Över tid och rum (1984)
- I nattens lugn (1986)
- Det svåra valet (1987)
- Indigo (1990)
- 454 (1999)
- Vidare (2006)
- Ännu vidare (2013)
- Vintertivoli (2015)

=== Compilation albums ===
- 81-87 (1988)
- Samling (1996)
- 101010 (2010)

=== Singles ===
- "För ung för att förstå" (1973)
- "Tillsammans (kan vi nå nånstans)" (1979)
- "Cinema" (1980)
- "Astronaut" (1981)
- "Blinkar blå" (1981)
- "Mer jul" (1984)
- "Blinkar blå" (acoustic version) (2006)

=== Participation on other albums ===
- Eldorado. Stjärnornas musik (1982)
- Eldorado. Äventyret fortsätter... (1987)
