= Pinkpop Festival =

Dutch music festival

Coordinates: 50°52′50″N 6°1′23″E

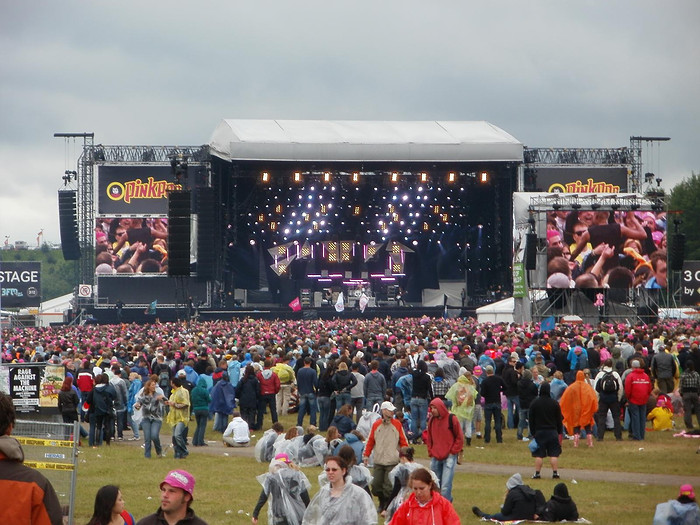
- Pinkpop main stage in 2010
- Genre: Rock, hip-hop, electronic, heavy metal, garage rock, alternative rock, indie rock
- Dates: Pentecost weekend
- Locations: Landgraaf, Netherlands
- Years active: 1970–present
- Founders: Jan Smeets
- Attendance: 108,250
- Capacity: 70,000
- Website: pinkpop.nl

Pinkpop is an annual music festival held in Landgraaf, Netherlands. It is currently the longest-running continuous annual pop music festival in the world. It is usually held on the Pentecost weekend ("Pinksteren" in Dutch, hence the name). If Pentecost falls on an early date in May, the festival is held later in June. The festival began in 1970 and has been held at Megaland, a 27-hectare site, since 1988.

The festival started in 1970 at Burgemeester Damen Sportpark in Geleen. It has been a three-day festival since 1996, with a capacity of 60,000 people per day and performances on four separate stages. From 2006 through 2011, Pinkpop sold out six years in a row. During 44 editions, more than two million people have attended Pinkpop. Some 700 music acts have played at the festival.

The Guinness World Records book names Pinkpop as the longest-running continuous annual pop music festival. The Reading Festival, first held in 1961, holds the record for being the oldest annual pop festival, but as its 1984–85 editions were cancelled by a local council ban, Pinkpop maintains the longest consecutive record.

== Name and logo ==
External image
- Pinkpop Logo picture on the German Wikipedia article on Pinkpop.

The name consists of two parts. 'Pink' comes from the Dutch word for Pentecost (Pinksteren) and 'pop' comes from pop music (or 'popular music'). But a later creative interpretation for the name combines the English word pink and the Dutch word pop, which means doll, thus forming the origin for the logo, a doll in a pink dress.

The precursor to Pinkpop was held on Pentecost Monday in 1969. It was completely free, and called Pinknick because people were supposed to bring their own food. Only a free pig roast and free apples were provided by the organizers. Inspired by the Monterey festival from 1967, a number of hip local bands were persuaded to come and play unpaid. Almost 10,000 visitors were attracted, ranging from pop music lovers to grandparents and their grandchildren. And families with empty shopping bags, loading up on apples. A young journalist Wim Wennekens and a youth group director Hans van Beers organised the event because they felt there was very little for young people to do in Limburg.

== History ==
In 1970, two men joined the duo to organise the first Pinkpop, including a 23-year-old named Jan Smeets. Over 10,000 people stood in front of an improvised stage built in the stands of the sports park in Geleen. The music was held on 18 May from 1 to 6 pm but still received noise complaints. In 1976, the festival reached its maximum capacity of 40,000 for the first time.

In 1988, the festival was held at Megaland, a 27-hectare site, for the first time. Construction on the event site began in 1982 on what was formerly the Staatsmijn Wilhelmina coal mine.

In 1994 (the 25th edition), it was decided to sell only 60,000 tickets, to prevent overcrowding due to the popularity of the festival. In 1995, it was made into a two-day festival. Two years later this was further expanded to three days.

In 2005, Pentecost was held earlier and keeping with tradition, the festival was held from 14 to 16 May. This was a month earlier than usual, so many bands' summer tours had not started yet because they usually stop at Pinkpop along other festivals such as Rock Werchter and Rock am Ring. Thus the headliners were three electronic acts: The Chemical Brothers, The Prodigy and Faithless. Ticket sales were a low 22,000: 16,000 fewer than 2004 and 40,000 fewer than 2002. As a result of the low turnout, founder Jan Smeets almost "pulled the plug" on the festival but decided to keep going.

2007 saw a spin-off, later in the year, on 11 August, called Pinkpop Classic, for an older rock audience, with bands that had previously performed at the festival in past decades. This spin-off was held again in following years, with the exception of 2011, when the organisation was not able to book enough artists.

In 2008, Pinkpop was not held on Pentecost weekend for the first time because the holiday was too early and Smeets did not want to repeat the same mistake as 2005. The festival was shifted to late May and turned out to have had the largest concert attendance to date with 94,000 unique visitors.

The dates for the 2010, 2013, 2015 and 2016 edition have been shifted as well, for similar reasons. The 2020 and 2021 Pinkpop festivals were not held due to the COVID-19 pandemic.

== Lineups ==
=== 2007 ===
Pinkpop 2007 was held from 26 to 28 May.

It was the 20th time the event was held at the Megaland Park.

On 28 February, most of the line-up was revealed. Pearl Jam was announced to make their 3rd appearance on the Pinkpop stage, but they cancelled, for two of their members would become fathers in the Pentecost weekend.

	Mainstage	3FM Stage	BUMA/John Peel Stage
Saturday 26 May	Goose; Juliette and the Licks; Within Temptation; Marilyn Manson	Noisettes; Wir sind Helden; Good Charlotte	Viberider; Stevie Ann; C-mon & Kypski
Sunday 27 May	Gabriel Ríos; Razorlight; Iggy & The Stooges; Snow Patrol; Muse	Ozark Henry; Gogol Bordello; Ilse DeLange; Lostprophets	The Nightwatchman; Paolo Nutini; Maxïmo Park; Krezip ^{[A]}
Monday 28 May	The Fratellis; Wolfmother; Scissor Sisters; Arctic Monkeys; Linkin Park; The Smashing Pumpkins	Thirty Seconds to Mars; Stone Sour; Dave Matthews Band; KoЯn; Evanescence	Five O'Clock Heroes; Maria Mena; Macy Gray; The Magic Numbers; The Kooks

^{A} Krezip replaced Amy Winehouse, because she had to cancel due to illness. Krezip started their gig playing Amy Winehouse's "Rehab".

=== 2008 ===
Pinkpop 2008 was held from 30 May to 1 June in the Landgraaf Megaland Park.

Pinkpop 2008 had the largest audience of concert attendees to date, with an average of just over 60,000 people arriving each of the three days, prompting the festival organizers to announce that 180,000 people had visited the festival. Because the 42,500 available three-day passes sold out completely, the actual number of unique visitors is 94,000.

	Mainstage	3FM Stage	GM Next (tent) Stage
Friday 30 May	Flogging Molly; Incubus; Metallica	Sat2D; Animal Alpha ^{[B]}; Alter Bridge	From First to Last; Jonathan Davis; Porcupine Tree
Saturday 31 May	Moke; KT Tunstall; Editors; Kaiser Chiefs; Foo Fighters	Air Traffic; Bad Religion; Eagles of Death Metal ^{[C]}; Stereophonics; The Verve	Blood Red Shoes; Voicst; Amy MacDonald; Justice; Groove Armada
Sunday 1 June	Fiction Plane; Gavin DeGraw; Racoon; Alanis Morissette; Queens of the Stone Age; Rage Against the Machine	The Wombats; Cavalera Conspiracy; The Hives; Serj Tankian; Counting Crows	Patrick Watson; Kate Nash; Pete Murray; Saybia; Róisín Murphy

^{B} Animal Alpha replaced Novastar, because they experienced delays in recording their new album.
^{C} Eagles of Death Metal replaced Chris Cornell, because he had obligations in the studio.

=== 2009 ===
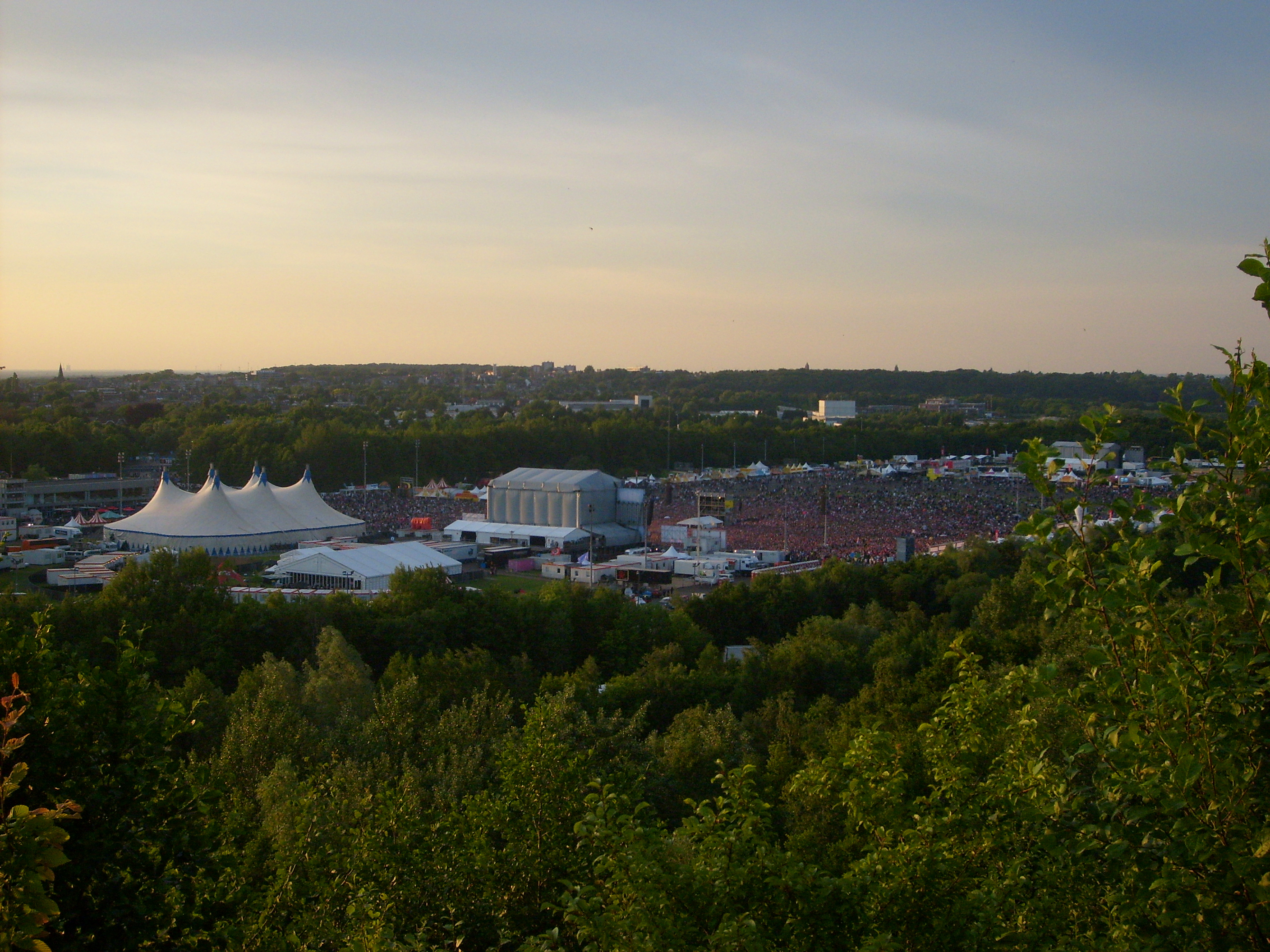
Pinkpop 2009

Pinkpop 2009 was held from 30 May to 1 June.

On 4 March 2009 the Pinkpop Board gave a press conference in Paradiso in Amsterdam, to answer questions from the press and announce which artists will be performing on Pinkpop 2009 will be announced.

	Mainstage	3FM Stage	Tent Stage
Saturday 30 May	Chris Cornell; The Killers; Bruce Springsteen & the E-Street Band	Kings of the Day; Me First and the Gimme Gimmes; Elbow	Noisettes; Just Jack; Dr. Lektroluv
Sunday 31 May	Milow; Volbeat; Madness; Krezip ^{[D]}; Placebo	De Staat; Rowwen Hèze; Maria Mena; James Morrison; Keane	You Me At Six; Kyteman's Hiphop Orchestra; The Rifles; White Lies; Pendulum
Monday 1 June	The Gaslight Anthem; Novastar; Amy Macdonald; Franz Ferdinand; Anouk; Snow Patrol	Shinedown; Mando Diao; Billy Talent; De Jeugd van Tegenwoordig; The Kooks	The All-American Rejects; Hollywood Undead; The Script; Katy Perry; The Ting Tings

^{D} Krezip replaced Depeche Mode, because lead singer Dave Gahan had to undergo a procedure after a tumor was spotted in his bladder two weeks before Pinkpop. Placebo replaced Depeche Mode as headliner.

=== 2010 ===
Pinkpop 2010 was held from 28 to 30 May.

	Mainstage	3FM Stage	Converse Stage
Friday 28 May	Epica; Kasabian; Motörhead; Rammstein	The Opposites; The Temper Trap; Paolo Nutini	Sungrazer; The Black Box Revelation; Gossip
Saturday 29 May	Moke & The Metropole Orchestra; C-mon & Kypski; Mando Diao; Editors; Green Day	Ryan Shaw ^{[E]}; Destine; Biffy Clyro; John Mayer	Everything Everything; Kitty, Daisy & Lewis; Caro Emerald; 2manydjs
Sunday 30 May	The Maccabees; Danko Jones; Skunk Anansie; Triggerfinger; Pixies; The Prodigy	Jon Allen; Kate Nash; Slash; Mika; Pink	DeWolff; General Fiasco; Yeasayer; Florence + The Machine; Gogol Bordello

^{E} Ryan Shaw replaced Wolfmother, because lead singer Andrew Stockdale was too sick to go on tour. Wolfmother was first planned on Sunday, but Triggerfinger covered their spot, so Ryan Shaw could play on Saturday.

=== 2011 ===
Pinkpop 2011 was held from 11 to 13 June.

Lineup	Mainstage	3FM Stage	Converse Stage
Saturday 11 June	De Staat; Lifehouse; Elbow; Coldplay	Manic Street Preachers; Simple Plan; Alter Bridge	Madi; Ash; Selah Sue
Sunday 12 June	Hurts; Tim Knol; -Wolfmother: White Lies; Kings of Leon	-VersaEmerge: Justin Nozuka; Graffiti6; Avenged Sevenfold	The Garden of Love; Hanson; Cage the Elephant; Laura Jansen; The Bloody Beetroots - Death Crew 77
Monday 13 June	Scouting for Girls; Two Door Cinema Club; Go Back to the Zoo; Volbeat; Kaiser Chiefs; Foo Fighters	Plain White T's; Beatsteaks; The Gaslight Anthem; The Script; Thirty Seconds to Mars	Dazzled Kid; Eliza Doolittle; All Time Low; Band of Horses; deadmau5

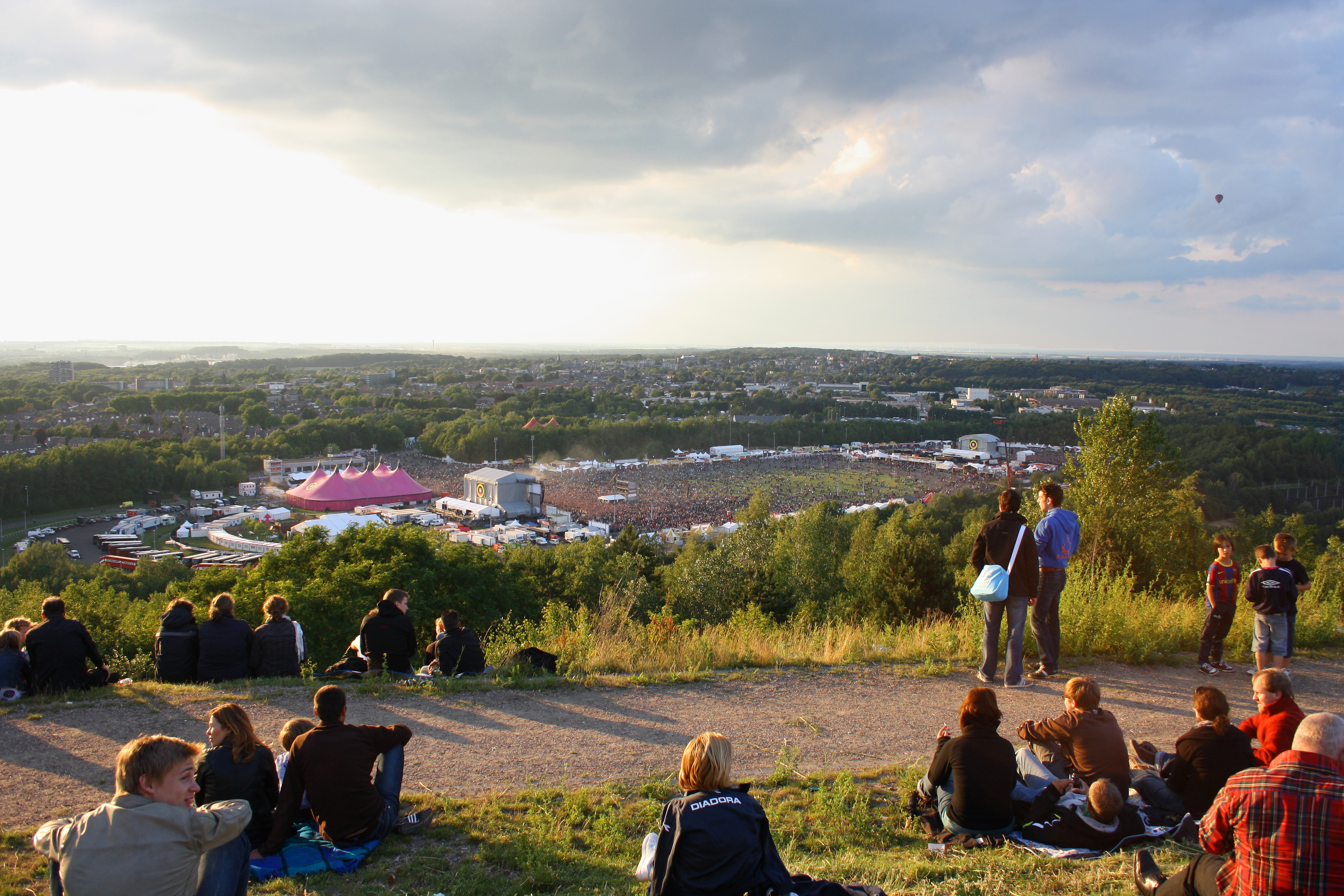
Pinkpop, 12 June 2011.

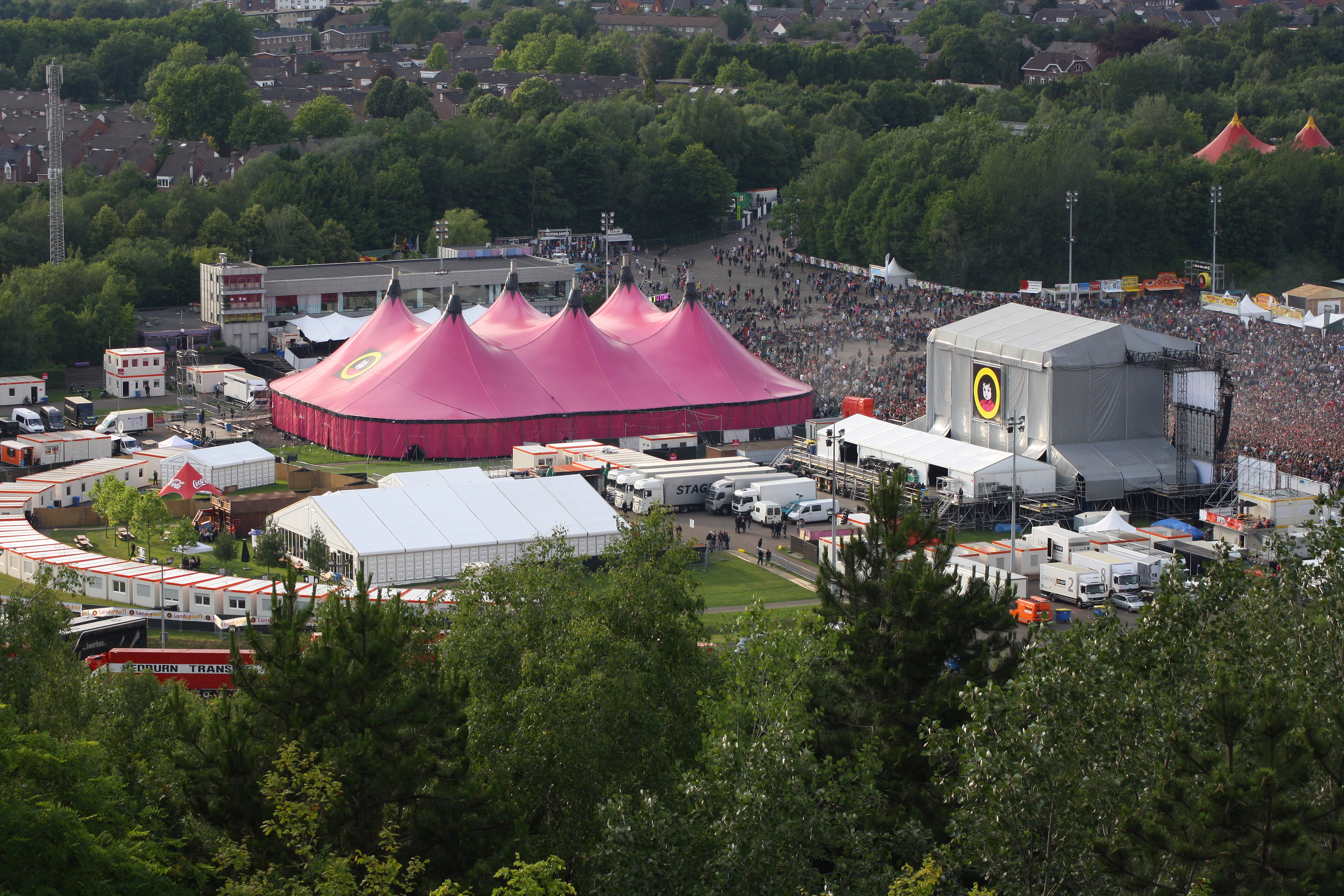
Converse-stage and Mainstage (2011)

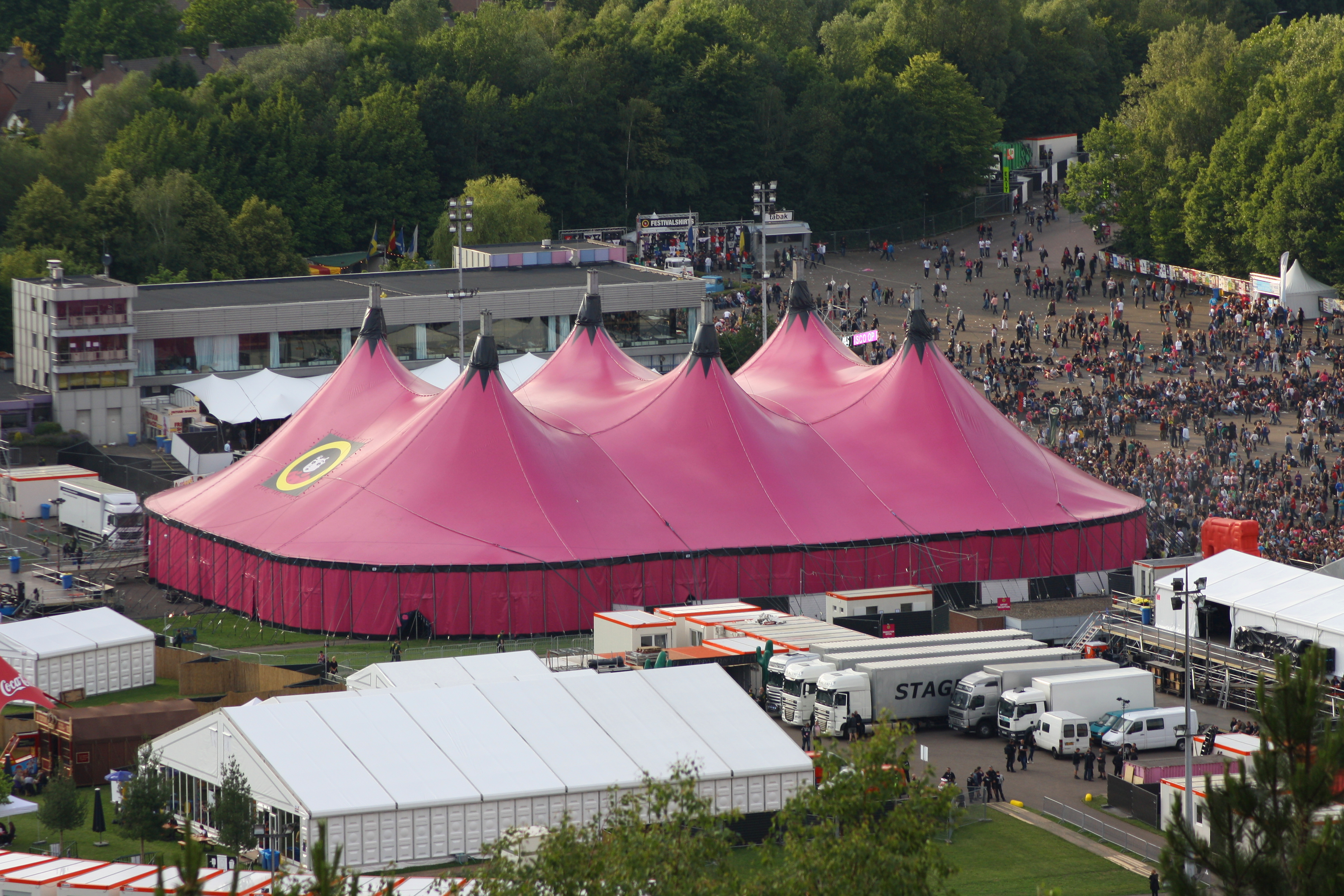
Converse-stage (2011)

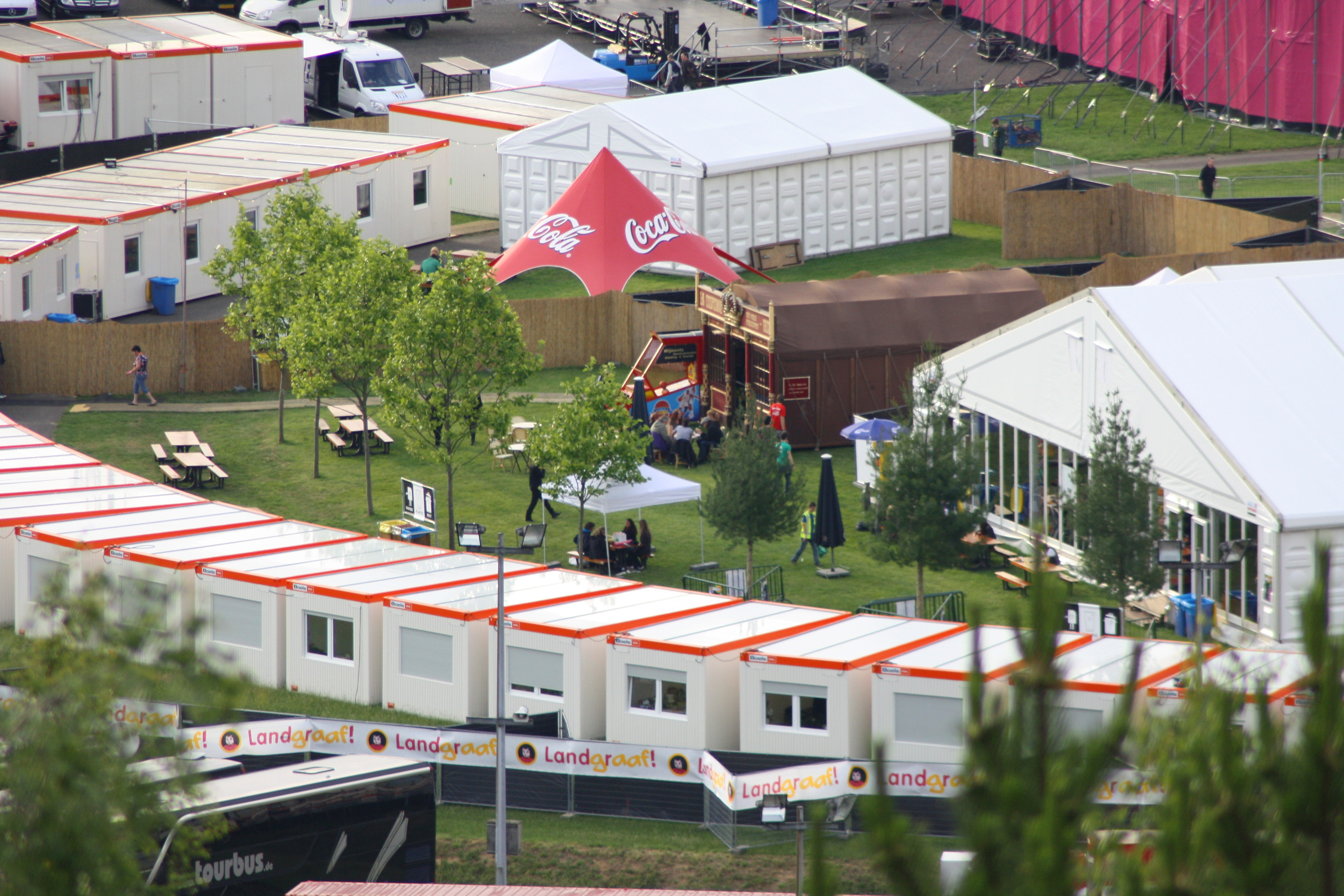
Backstage (2011)

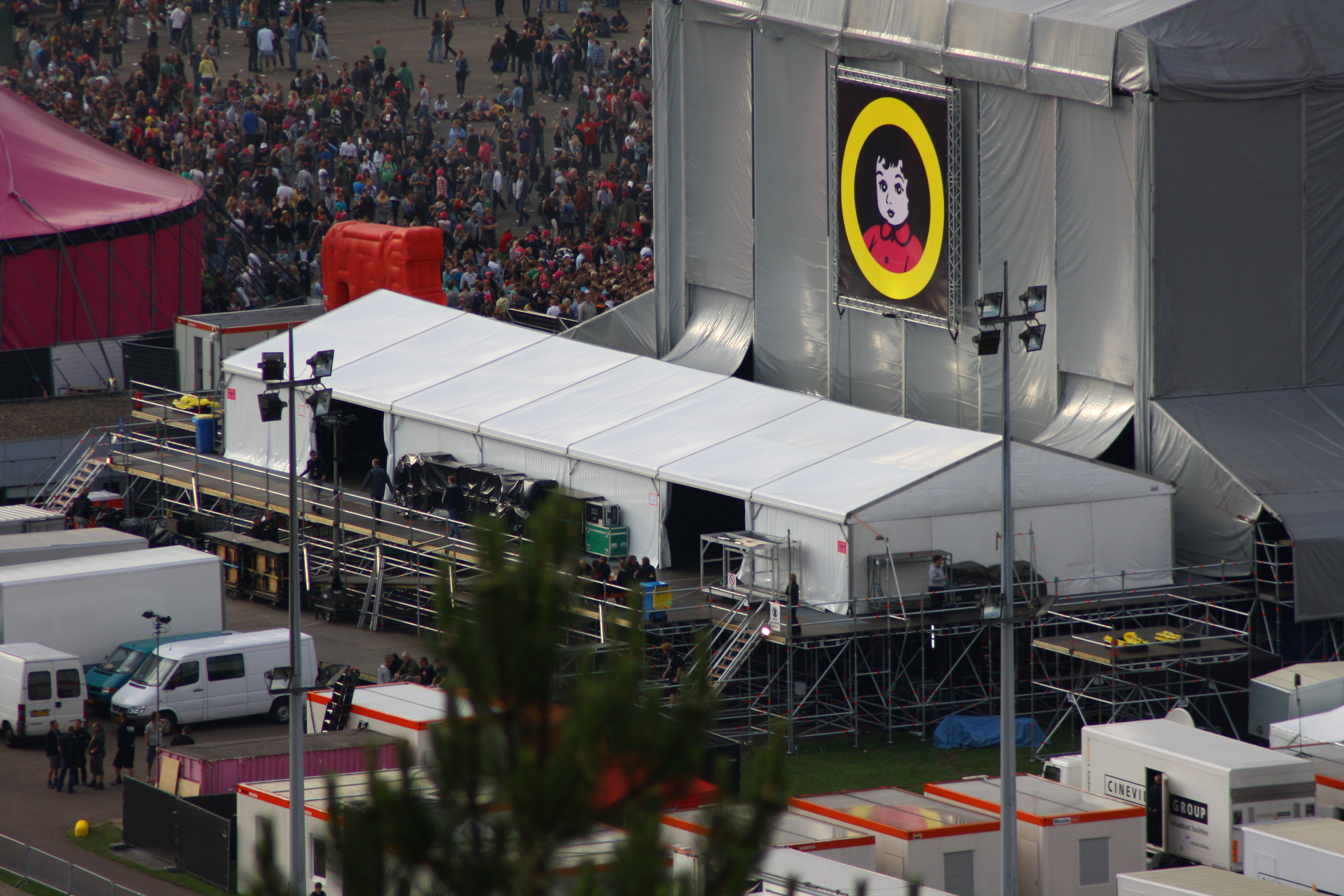
Entrance Mainstage (2011)

=== 2012 ===
Pinkpop 2012 was held from 26 to 28 May.

Lineup	Mainstage	3FM Stage	Converse Stage
Saturday 26 May	Moss; Kyuss Lives! ^{[F]}; Anouk; The Cure	Major Tom; The Asteroids Galaxy Tour; The Ting Tings	Will and The People; The Afghan Whigs; Ben Howard
Sunday 27 May	Babylon Circus; Racoon; The Kyteman Orchestra; Soundgarden; Linkin Park	The Bosshoss; Mastodon; The Wombats; Keane	Hungry Kids of Hungary; Bombay Bicycle Club; Sharon Jones & The Dap-Kings; Chase & Status
Monday 28 May	Gers Pardoel; Seasick Steve; The Specials; Mumford and Sons; Bruce Springsteen & The E-Street Band	Rival Sons; Blood Red Shoes; Herbert Grönemeyer; The Hives; James Morrison	Serena Pryne & The Mandeviles; Jonathan Jeremiah; Miike Snow; Chef’Special; Paul Kalkbrenner

^{F} At first Kasabian would perform as well, but they had to cancel due to private matters. Kyuss Lives! replaced Kasabian's spot, Moss covered Kyuss Lives!'s spot.

=== 2013 ===
Pinkpop 2013 was held from 14 to 16 June, the third time that it was not held on the weekend of Pentecost.

Lineup	Mainstage	3FM Stage	Brand Bier Stage
Friday 14 June	Handsome Poets; Paramore; The Script; The Killers	Masters of Reality; Jimmy Eat World; Queens of the Stone Age	Christopher Green; Kodaline; Andy Burrows; Netsky Live
Saturday 15 June	La Pegatina; Passenger; The Opposites; Thirty Seconds to Mars; Kings of Leon	Douwe Bob; Fun.; The Gaslight Anthem; Phoenix (French band)	Palma Violets; Graveyard; Miles Kane; Ellie Goulding; C2C
Sunday 16 June	Kensington; Will and the People; The Vaccines; Ben Howard; Green Day	Tom Odell; Trixie Whitley; Blaudzun; Stereophonics; Triggerfinger	Puggy; Bastille; Lianne La Havas; Die Antwoord; Alt-J

=== 2014 ===
Pinkpop 2014 was held from 7 to 9 June .

Lineup	Mainstage	3FM Stage	Brand Bier Stage	Stage 4
Saturday 7 June	Ed Kowalczyk; Flogging Molly; John Mayer; The Rolling Stones	Haim; Joe Bonamassa; Bastille	Les Djinns; Thé Lau/The Scene; White Lies; Epica	Paceshifters; Afterpartees; Gecko
Sunday 8 June	Chef'Special; The Kooks; Ed Sheeran; Editors; Arctic Monkeys	North Mississippi Allstars; Limp Bizkit; Rudimental; Paolo Nutini; Robert Plant and the Sensational Spaceshifters	Taymir; Portugal. The Man; Twenty One Pilots; The Boxer Rebellion; John Newman	Nina Nesbitt; Intergalactic Lovers; Brother & Bones
Monday 9 June	Mastodon; Rob Zombie; Biffy Clyro; Avenged Sevenfold; Metallica	Jett Rebel; Kodaline; Stromae; Jake Bugg; Arcade Fire	Clean Bandit; Ghost; Young the Giant; Bombay Bicycle Club; Gogol Bordello	Birth of Joy; Powerman 5000; Kraantje Pappie

=== 2015 ===
Pinkpop 2015 was held from 12 to 14 June; the fourth time that it was not held on the weekend of Pentecost.

Lineup	Mainstage	3FM Stage	Brand Bier Stage	Stage 4	Garden of Love
Friday 12 June	Body Count; George Ezra; Elbow; Muse	Shaka Ponk; Faith No More; Slash feat. Myles Kennedy & The Conspirators	Jick Munro & The Amazing Laserbeams; Gavin James; Paloma Faith; Above & Beyond	Coasts; Aurora; Pop Evil; DJs Waxfiend & Prime + Jebroer & Adje	Anna Rune
Saturday 13 June	The Wombats; Dotan; Anouk; The Script; Robbie Williams	The Last Internationale; Jonathan Jeremiah; Selah Sue; Kensington; Avicii	Gaz Coombes; Magic!; John Coffey; Sheppard; Eagles of Death Metal	Causes; Twin Atlantic; East Cameron Folklore; Lonely the Brave; Joost van Bellen	Judy Blank
Sunday 14 June	Frank Turner & The Sleeping Souls; Triggerfinger; OneRepublic; De Jeugd van Tegenwoordig; Pharrell Williams ^{[H]}	Kitty, Daisy & Lewis; Typhoon; Rise Against; Counting Crows; Placebo ^{[G]}	Urbanus & De Fanfaar; Nick Mulvey; Oscar and the Wolf; Kovacs; Fiddler's Green	Pierce Brothers; The Deaf; Peace; Ewert and The Two Dragons; Willie Wartaal & Doppelgang	Polly Anna

^{G} At first Sam Smith would perform as well, but they had to cancel due to voice problems. Placebo replaced Sam Smith's spot.
^{H} Originally the Foo Fighters would serve as the festival's headliner but had to cancel their performance due to a broken leg by frontman Dave Grohl two days earlier. Pharrell Williams became headliner instead and the Flemish trio Triggerfinger was added as a last-minute addition to the line-up.

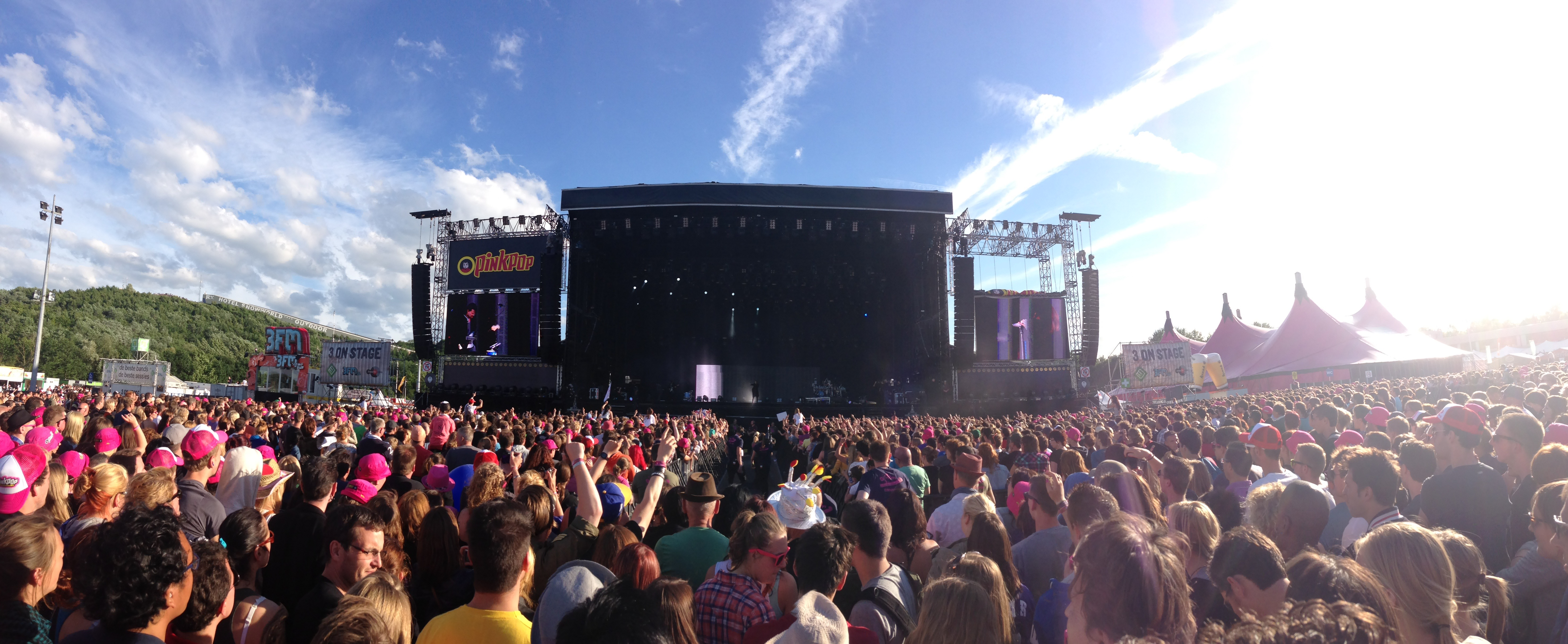
Pinkpop 2015

=== 2016 ===
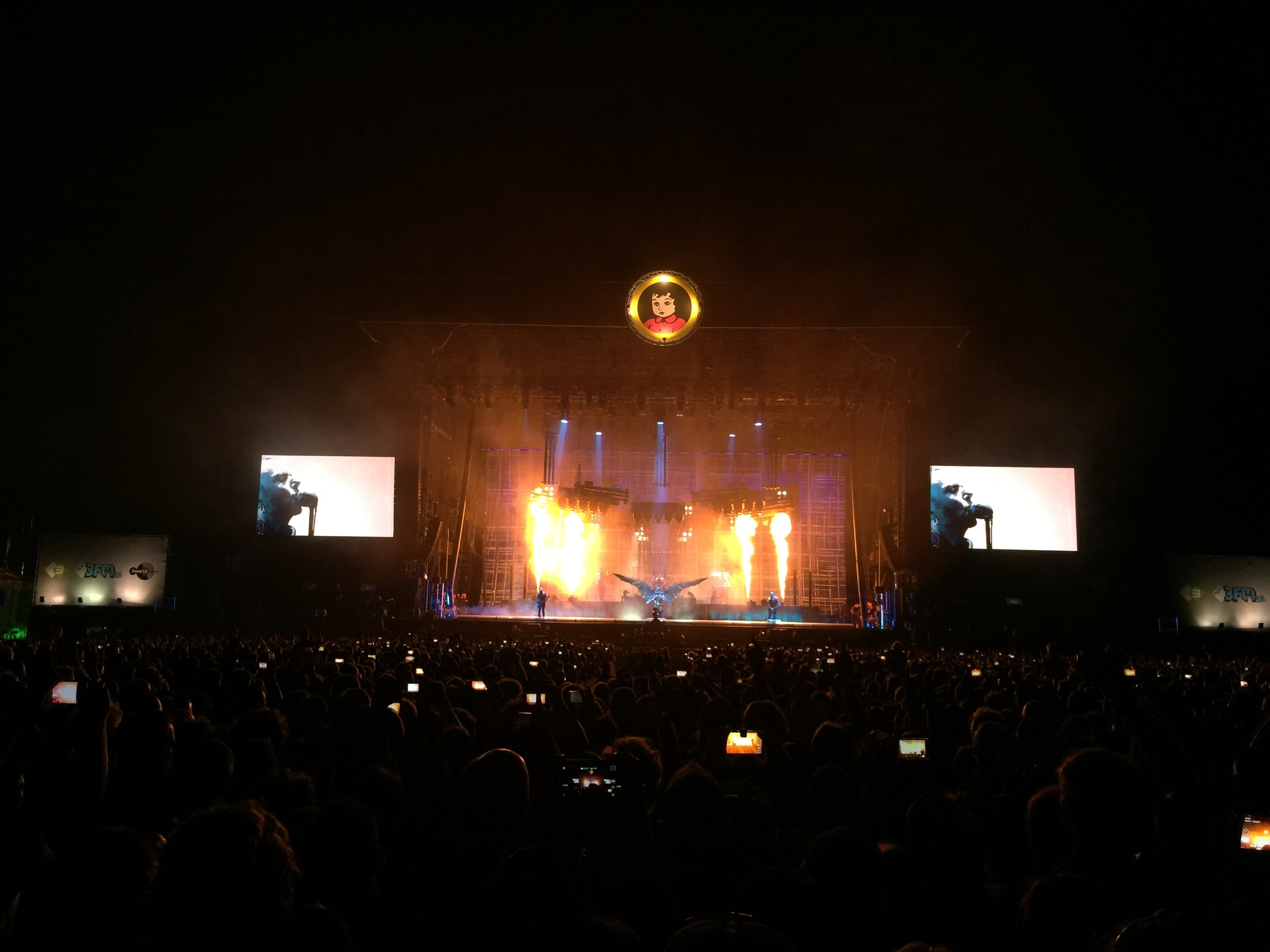
Pinkpop 2016

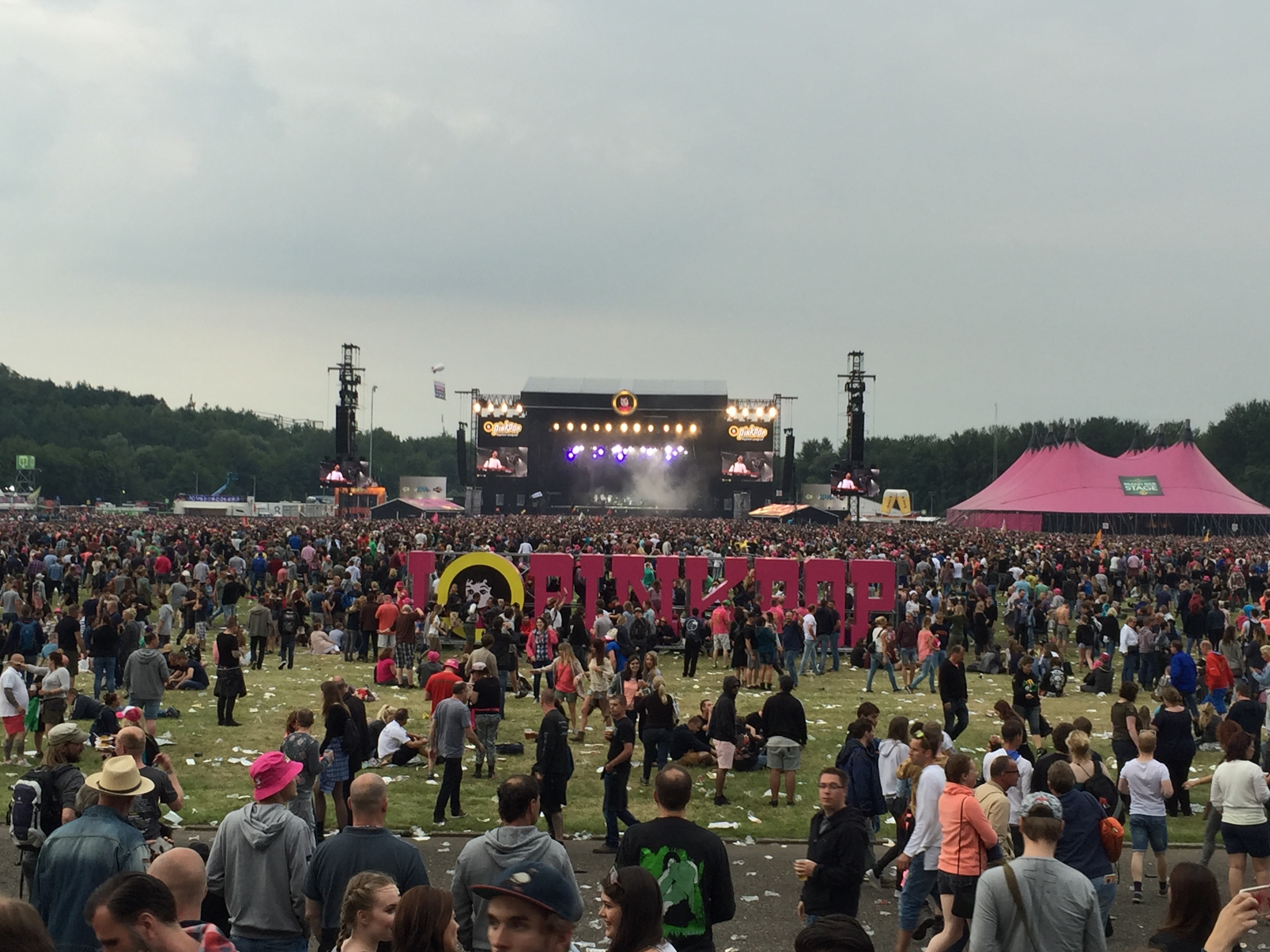
Pinkpop 2016

Pinkpop 2016 was held from 10–12 June.

Lineup	Mainstage	3FM Stage	Brand Bier Stage	Stage 4	Garden of Love
Friday 10 June	The Common Linnets; Bastille; James Bay; Red Hot Chili Peppers	Gary Clark Jr.; Years & Years; Major Lazer	Storsky; Lukas Graham; Bear's Den; De Staat	The Struts; Sara Hartman; One Ok Rock; Skip&Die (dj-set) & Friends	Clean Pete
Saturday 11 June	Walk Off The Earth; James Morrison; Lianne La Havas; Doe Maar; Rammstein	Imelda May; Halestorm; Skillet; De Staat; Puscifer	Miamigo; Lucas Hamming; Matt Simons; Nothing But Thieves; Robin Schulz	The Sore Losers; Parquet Courts; Lucky Fonz III; Bazart; Noisia	Madi Hermens
Sunday 12 June	Douwe Bob; John Newman; Kygo; Lionel Richie; Paul McCartney	Jungle By Night; Vintage Trouble; All Time Low; Bring Me the Horizon; Skunk Anansie	Harts; St. Paul & The Broken Bones; Jamie Lawson; Tom Odell; Balthazar	Walking on Cars; Slaves; The London Souls; Graveyard; Sevn Alias/Broederliefde	Midas

=== 2017 ===
Pinkpop 2017 was held from 3 to 5 June.

Lineup	Mainstage	3FM Stage	Brightlands Stage	Stage 4	Garden of Love
Saturday 3 June	James TW; Chef'Special; Kensington; Justin Bieber; Martin Garrix	White Lies; Kaiser Chiefs; Five Finger Death Punch	The Ten Bells; Pierce Brothers; Crystal Fighters; Richard Ashcroft	Alma; Declan McKenna; Ronnie Flex & Deuxperience Band	Lotte Walda
Sunday 4 June	Gavin James; Kodaline; Broederliefde; Imagine Dragons; Green Day	Anne-Marie; James Arthur; Clean Bandit; Biffy Clyro; Sean Paul	Jack Savoretti; My Baby; The Charm The Fury; Birdy; Rancid	Undeclinable Ambuscade; Busty and the Bass; Amber Run; Bomba Estéreo	Charl Delemarre
Monday 5 June	Seasick Steve; Guus Meeuwis; Passenger; Live; Kings Of Leon	Machine Gun Kelly; Rag'n'Bone Man; Sum 41; Prophets of Rage; System Of A Down	Gutter-Dämmerung; Oh Wonder; Liam Gallagher; Fat Freddy's Drop; MØ	Midas; Don Broco; Chris Ayer; JP Cooper	Gerson Main

=== 2018 ===
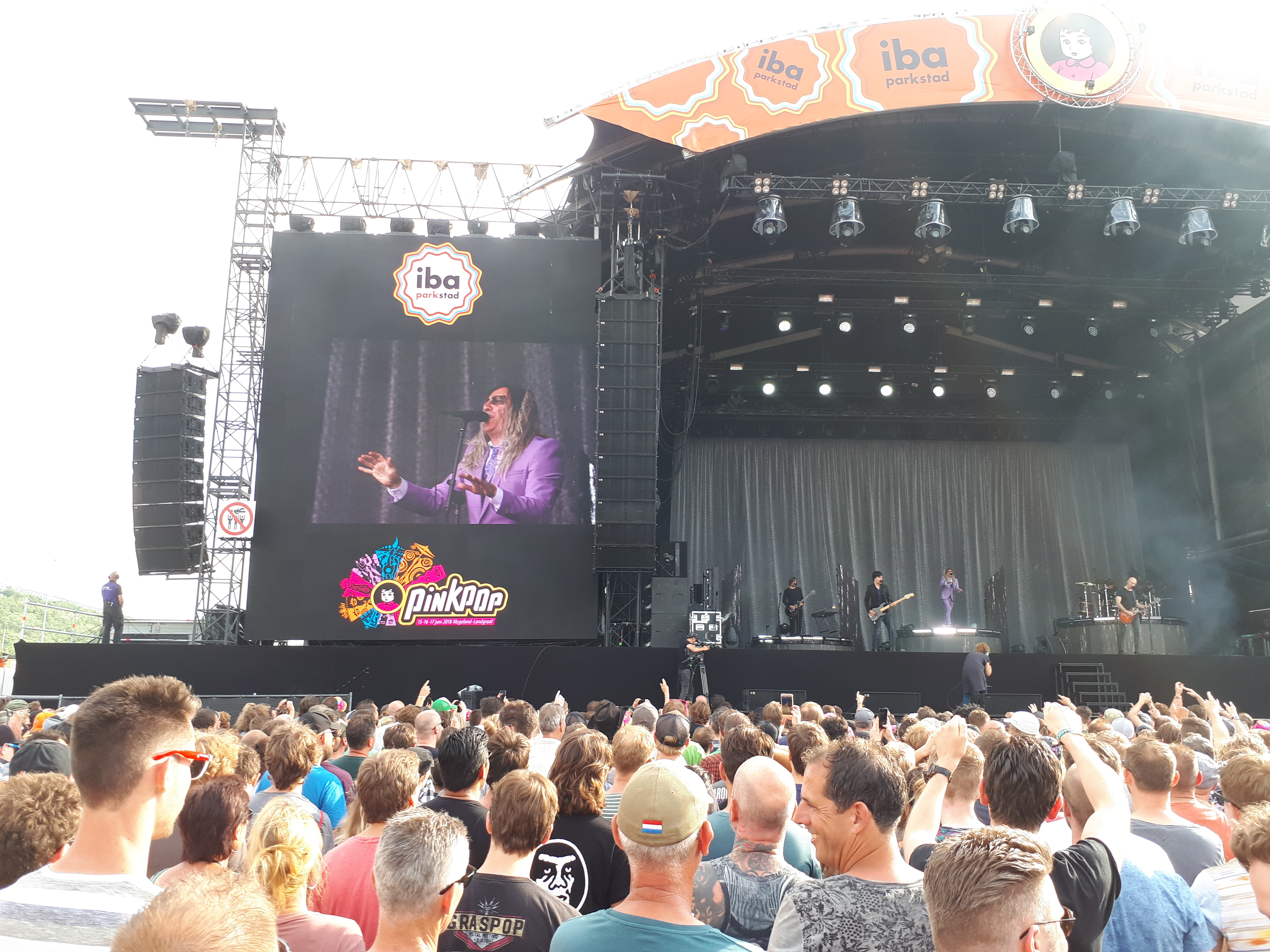
A Perfect Circle at Pinkpop 2018

Pinkpop 2018 was held from 15 to 17 June.

A fatal traffic accident involving festival-goers took place in the early morning of 18 June. After the festival, at around 04:00, a group of persons sat on the road near Campsite B, which was not closed to vehicular traffic. A van travelling along this road could not avoid the group and ran into the group, killing one and severely injuring three more. The driver reported himself to the police several hours later in Amsterdam.

During the performance of the Foo Fighters on 16 June, the disintegration of a large meteor was observed in the sky right behind the main stage and caught on video. The fireball and its disintegration was widely observed also elsewhere in the Benelux countries, Germany and France. An analysis of over 200 eyewitness reports suggests that the disintegration took place at 23:11 local time near the Belgian city of Liège.

Lineup	Mainstage	North Stage	Brightlands Tent	Stage 4	Garden of Love
Saturday 15 June	Lil' Kleine; BLØF; Snow Patrol; Pearl Jam	Jess Glynne; Oh Wonder; The Offspring	Walden; The Last Internationale; Blaudzun; Oliver Heldens	Slydigs; The Academic; Donnie	Aïcha Cherif
Sunday 16 June	Walking On Cars; Miss Montreal; Nothing But Thieves; The Script; Foo Fighters	JP Cooper; Parov Stelar; A Perfect Circle; Noel Gallagher's High Flying Birds	Marmozets; Aurora; Sevn Alias; Alan Walker	Theo Lawrence & The Hearts; Gang Of Youths; Youngr; De Likt	Riley Pierce
Monday 17 June	Ronnie Flex & Deuxperience; Jessie J; DI-RECT; Editors; DJ Rashida; Bruno Mars	Michelle David & The Gospel Sessions; Milky Chance; Years & Years; Triggerfinger; Oscar & The Wolf	Cloves; Maan; Brian Fallon & The Howling Weather; Don Diablo; Greta Van Fleet	Tom Walker; The Overslept; Scarlet Pleasure; Sigrid	Blackbird

=== 2019 ===
Pinkpop 2019 was held from 8 to 10 June.

This marked Pinkpop's 50th anniversary.

Lineup	Mainstage	IBA Parkstad Stage	Brightlands Stage	Stage 4	Garden of Love
Saturday 8 June	Bazart; George Ezra; Anouk; Jamiroquai; Mumford & Sons	SYML; Golden Earring; Cage the Elephant; Jacob Banks; Elbow	Mt. Atlas; Yungblud; Davina Michelle; Halestorm; San Holo	Grace Carter; Badflower; Hippo Campus; Jacin Trill & Leafs	Soham De
Sunday 9 June	Kraantje Pappie; The Kooks; Krezip; Lenny Kravitz; The Cure; Armin Van Buuren	White Lies; Rowwen Hèze; J Balvin; Die Antwoord	Blood Red Shoes; Jack Savoretti; Miles Kane; Mark Ronson	Au/Ra; Confidence Man; Barns Courtney; Boef; Silent Disco	Nana Adjoa
Monday 10 June	Jett Rebel; The 1975; Slash ft. Myles Kennedy & The Conspirators; Bastille; Fleetwood Mac	The Bosshoss; Bring Me the Horizon; Tenacious D; Dropkick Murphys; Major Lazer	Indian Askin; Kovacs; The Pretenders; Duncan Laurence; Michael Kiwanuka	Coldrain; Coely; Palaye Royale; DeWolff	David Keenan

=== 2020 ===
Pinkpop 2020 was planned for 19–21 June but was cancelled due to the COVID-19 pandemic.

Acts scheduled to appear included, in order of billing:

- Guns N' Roses
- Post Malone
- Red Hot Chili Peppers
- Deftones
- Disturbed
- Keane
- Marshmello
- Twenty One Pilots
- Volbeat
- Zara Larsson
- Anderson .Paak & The Free Nationals
- Ares
- Balthazar
- Bishop Briggs
- Chef'Special
- Crowded House
- Danny Vera
- Dermot Kennedy
- Ellie Goulding
- Five Seconds of Summer
- Floor Jansen
- Frank Carter & The Rattlesnakes
- Frenna Deluxe
- Gojira
- Inhaler
- James Arthur
- JC Stewart
- Joost
- Kensington
- Liam Payne
- Lost Frequencies
- Mabel
- Maisie Peters
- Nona
- Nothing But Thieves
- Of Monsters and Men
- Querbeat
- Rag'n'Bone Man
- Saint Phnx
- Sea Girls
- Supergrass
- Ten Times a Million
- The Big Moon
- The Kik
- The Last Internationale
- The Marcus King Band
- The Pretty Reckless
- Velvet Volume

=== 2021 ===
Pinkpop 2021 was planned for 18–20 June but, like in the previous year, was cancelled due to the COVID-19 pandemic.

Acts scheduled to appear included:

- Deftones
- Frenna
- Kensington
- Pearl Jam
- Red Hot Chili Peppers
- Twenty One Pilots
- Ares
- Danny Vera
- Elle Hollis
- JC Stewart
- Joost
- Nona
- Ten Times A Million

=== 2022 ===
Pinkpop 2022 took place from 17 to 19 June.

Acts that appeared:

- Twenty One Pilots
- Metallica
- Pearl Jam
- Nile Rodgers & Chic
- Imagine Dragons
- Nightwish
- Mother Mother
- Greta Van Fleet

=== 2023 ===
Pinkpop 2023 took place from 16 to 18 June.

Acts that appeared:

- Lumineers
- P!nk
- Robbie Williams
- Red Hot Chili Peppers
- Editors
- Queens of the Stone Age
- Go_A
- OneRepublic
- Ellie Goulding
- Electric Callboy

=== 2024 ===
Pinkpop 2024 took place from 21 to 23 June.

Acts that appeared:

- Palaye Royale
- Yungblud
- Avril Lavigne
- Måneskin
- Louis Tomlinson
- Calvin Harris
- Hozier
- Ed Sheeran
- Babymetal
- Royal Blood
- Keane
- Corey Taylor
- Nothing but Thieves
- Against The Current
- Loreen

=== 2025 ===
Pinkpop 2025 took place from 20 to 22 June.

The list of acts has yet to be finalized, but according to the official Pinkpop website, acts that will appear include:

- Olivia Rodrigo
- Justin Timberlake
- Muse
- Tate McRae
- The Last Dinner Party
- Korn
- Oscar and the Wolf
- Faithless
- Dean Lewis
- Inhaler
- Mark Ambor
- Girl in Red
- Weezer
- Joost
- Biffy Clyro
- The Academic
- Alestorm
- Amyl and The Sniffers
- The Warning
- Benee
- The Boxer Rebellion
- Confidence Man
- Cypress Hill
- Kaiser Chiefs
- Purple Disco Machine

== Editions ==
Edition	Year	Dates	Headliners	Attendance
27th	1996	May 25–27	The Prodigy · Rage Against the Machine	59,000
28th	1997	May 17–19	Korn · The Orb · Beck	49,200
29th	1998	May 30–June 1	The Verve · The Smashing Pumpkins	51,500
30th	1999	May 22–24	Alanis Morissette · Faithless · Underworld	61,250
31st	2000	June 10–12	Oasis · 16 Horsepower · Moby	66,300
32nd	2001	June 2–4	Krezip · K's Choice · Radiohead	64,200
33rd	2002	May 18–20	Live · Faithless · Rammstein	63,345
34th	2003	June 7–9	Moby · Massive Attack · Manu Chao	47,530
35th	2004	May 29–31	HIM · Tiësto · Lenny Kravitz	36,000
36th	2005	May 14–16	The Chemical Brothers · The Prodigy · Faithless	20,000
37th	2006	June 3–5	Placebo · Tool · Red Hot Chili Peppers	68,000
38th	2007	May 26–28	Marilyn Manson · Muse · The Smashing Pumpkins	62,500
39th	2008	May 30–June 1	Metallica · Foo Fighters · Rage Against the Machine	94,000
40th	2009	May 30–June 1	Bruce Springsteen · Depeche Mode · Snow Patrol	90,000
41st	2010	May 28–30	Rammstein · Green Day · The Prodigy	72,100
42nd	2011	June 11–13	Coldplay · Kings of Leon · Foo Fighters	91,900
43rd	2012	June 26–28	Bruce Springsteen · Linkin Park · The Cure	79,000
44th	2013	June 14–16	The Killers · Green Day · Kings of Leon	60,000
45th	2014	June 7–9	The Rolling Stones · Arctic Monkeys · Metallica	134,000
46th	2015	June 12–14	Muse · Robbie Williams · Foo Fighters	112,500
47th	2016	June 10–12	Red Hot Chili Peppers · Rammstein · Paul McCartney	116,750
48th	2017	June 3–5	Justin Bieber · Green Day · Kings of Leon	89,500
49th	2018	June 15–17	Pearl Jam · Foo Fighters · Bruno Mars	113,500
50th	2019	June 8–10	Mumford & Sons · The Cure · Fleetwood Mac	80,500
—N/a	2020	June 19–21 (cancelled)	Red Hot Chili Peppers · Post Malone · Guns N' Roses	—N/a
—N/a	2021	June 18–20 (cancelled)	Red Hot Chili Peppers · Pearl Jam	—N/a
51st	2022	June 17–19	Metallica · Pearl Jam · Imagine Dragons	108,250
52nd	2023	June 16–18	Pink · Robbie Williams · Red Hot Chili Peppers	104,600
53rd	2024	June 21–23	Måneskin · Calvin Harris · Ed Sheeran	82,553
54th	2025	June 20–22	Justin Timberlake · Olivia Rodrigo · Muse	
55th	2026	June 19–21	The Cure · Foo Fighters · Twenty One Pilots	

== See also ==
- List of historic rock festivals
