= Fews (disambiguation) =

Fews is an American-English-Swedish rock band, formed in 2014 in Malmö, Sweden.

Fews may also refer to:

- Fews, a village and civil parish in County Waterford, Ireland
- Famine Early Warning Systems Network, also known as FEWS NET, USAID website providing early warning information and analysis of current and future acute food insecurity
