= Into Red =

Studio album by Fews
- Released: 1 March 2019
- Length: 39:57
- Label: PIAS

Fews chronology
Means (2016)	Into Red (2019)

Singles from Into Red
- 1. "Business Man" Released: 21 August 2018; 2. "Paradiso" Released: 13 November 2018; 3. "More Than Ever" Released: 29 January 2019

Into Red is the second studio album by Swedish American krautrock band, Fews. The album was released on 1 March 2019 through PIAS Recordings.

== Background ==
After a one-year hiatus, the band returned in mid-2018 with the release of a new single called "Business Man". On 13 November 2018, Fews announced that their second album, Into Red will be released on 1 March 2019.

== Track listing ==
No.	Title	Length
1.	"Quiet"	4:42
2.	"Paradiso"	4:11
3.	"More Than Ever"	3:20
4.	"Suppose"	3:26
5.	"Limits"	4:03
6.	"Business Man"	4:08
7.	"97"	4:11
8.	"Anything Else"	4:48
9.	"Over"	2:41
10.	"Fiction"	4:27
Total length:		39:57
