= Causes =

Causes, or causality, is the relationship between one event and another. It may also refer to:

- Causes (band), an indie band based in the Netherlands
- Causes (company), an online company

== See also ==
- Cause (disambiguation)
