= Fews =

American-Swedish rock band

- Origin: Malmö, Sweden; London, England
- Genres: Post-punk; krautrock; noise pop; neo-psychedelia
- Years active: 2014–present
- Label: PIAS
- Spinoffs: Summer Heart, Sameblod
- Members: Frederick Rundquist; Jay Clifton; Rasmus Andersson
- Past members: Alexander Blomfeldt; David Alexander Lomelino
- Website: fews.bandcamp.com

Fews (stylised as FEWS) are an American-English-Swedish rock band, formed in 2014 in Malmö, Sweden. They were based in London around the release of their debut album. Self described as post-punk, with motorik elements of krautrock and noise pop, the band blends this sound with elements of neo-psychedelia.

The band have released three albums, Means in 2016, Into Red in 2019 and GLASS CITY in 2023.

== History ==
FEWS were formed in 2014 by David Alexander Lomelino and Frederick Rundquist. Both had previously been involved in electronic/pop projects in Sweden, although Rundquist is originally from San Francisco - Lomelino working under the pseudonym Summer Heart, and Rundquist was a member of Sameblod with Mikael Mattisson. Both acts were signed to Swedish record label Sommarhjarta. Reportedly meeting via MySpace, Summer Heart appeared on Sameblod's album Braided Memos in 2012, and in 2014 remixed the song Loud by Sameblod, and the song Suddenly which was released on the band's Suddenly Remix EP.

The duo enlisted bassist Alexander Blomfeldt and drummer Rasmus Andersson, who was previously a guitarist. The band submitted a demo of The Zoo to PIAS Recordings, and signed soon after.

The band released their debut single Ill in June 2015 by means of UK label Speedy Wunderground, after English record producer Dan Carey got in touch with the band.

On 20 May 2016, the band released their debut studio album Means via PIAS. The album was preceded by 2 singles proper: "The Zoo" which was released in November 2015 and "100 Goosebumps" in March 2016, and "Drinking Games" in May 2016. The band's original bassist Alexander Blomfeldt left the band on the last day of recording in London, returning to Sweden. Commenting on his departure, Rundquist stated "he's still one of my best friends but he wants to do the normal things in life like buy a house, buy a car and have a family". He was replaced by English bassist Jay Clifton in March 2016.

After a one-year hiatus, the band returned in August 2018 with the release of a new single called "Business Man". The band released their second album Into Red on 1 March 2019.

On 14 March 2019, the band announced that David Alexander Lomelino was leaving the band, and that the March EU/UK tour would be his last with them. Lomelino is continuing to work on his Summer Heart project.

Late 2019, Jacob Olson from the band Useless Eaters joined the band to replace David Alexander Lomelino.

== Band members ==
- Frederick Rundquist — vocals, guitar
- Jay Clifton — bass
- Rasmus Andersson— drums
- Jacob Olson - guitar

== Discography ==
=== Studio albums ===
- Means (2016)
- Into Red (2019)
- GLASS CITY (2023)

=== Singles ===
- "ILL" (2015)
- "The Zoo" (2015)
- "100 Goosebumps" (2016)
- "Drinking Games" (2016)
- "LaGuardia" (2017)
- "Metal" (2017)
- "Business Man" (2018)
- "Paradiso" (2018)
- "More Than Ever" (2019)
