= C-mon & Kypski =

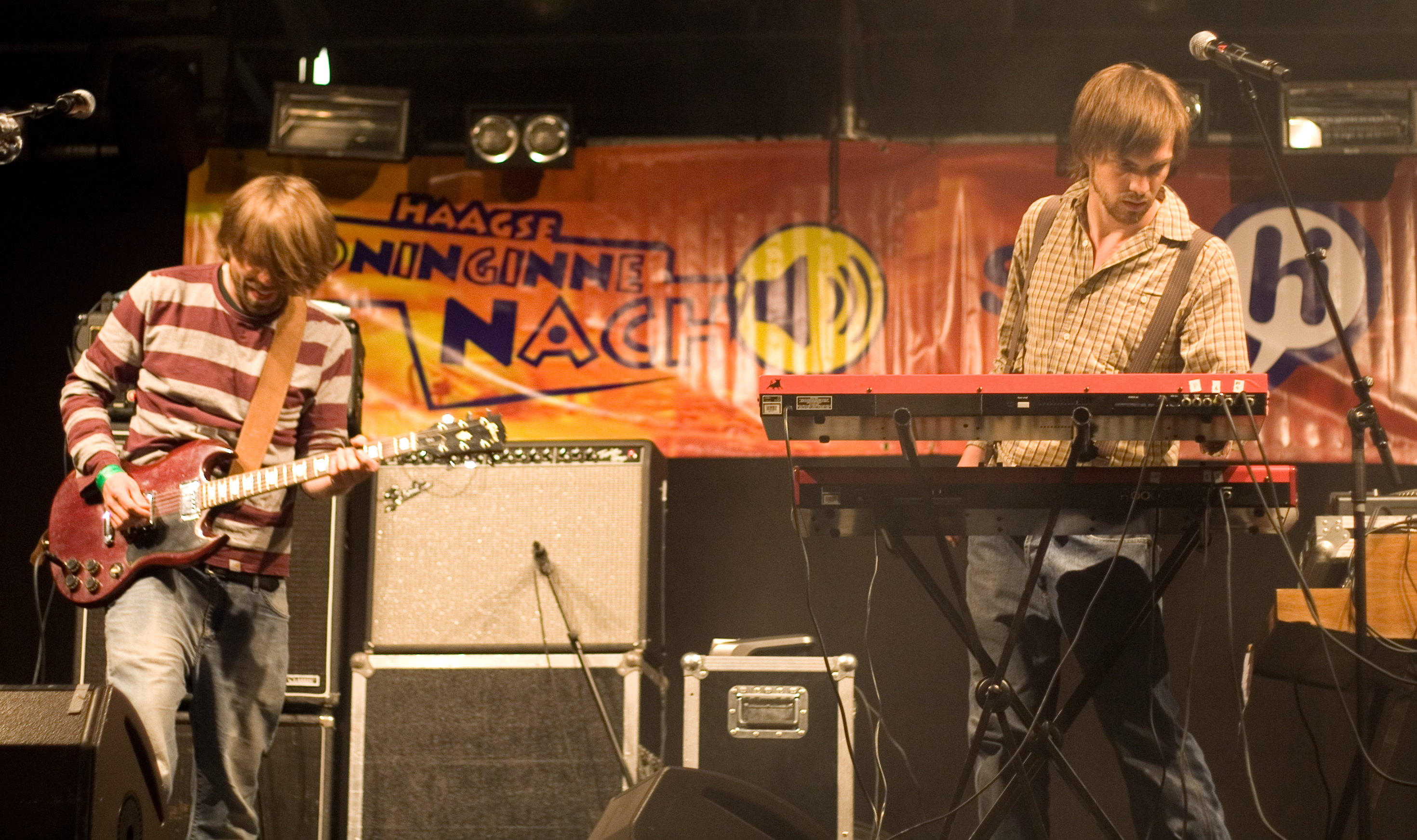

Background information
- Origin: Utrecht, Netherlands
- Genres: Hip hop, funk, rock
- Years active: 2000-present
- Labels: Supertracks; Dexdexter Records
- Members: Thomas Elbers (Kypski); Simon Akkermans (C-mon); Daniel Rose; Jori Collignon

C-mon & Kypski is a Dutch musical group from Utrecht. The band consists of four members: Thomas Elbers alias Kypski (discjockey, producer), Simon Akkermans alias C-Mon (dj, producer), Daniel Rose ((bass) guitar) and Jori Collignon (keyboardist).

== Biography ==
C-Mon & Kypski had tours in Europe, North America and South Africa, and released four albums. They first experimented with hip-hop and electronica, and later on a more eclectic sound. C-Mon & Kypski makes genre-crossing music. Esquire magazine (USA) described the band in 2007 as "The hot shit in Europe right now."

For example, the band have used turntables and guitars, synthesizers, odd samples, jazz musicians, rappers and a Klezmer band. They also mix flamenco and dubstep with their music.

On October 23, 2009, the band released the album 'We Are Square'.

C-Mon & Kypski consists of: Simon (C-Mon); producer and co-founder of the band, Thomas (Kypski); co-founder and six times Dutch DMC champion, Jori; keyboard player and winner of the Devils issued annually by the music industry, and Daniel; guitarist and multi-instrumentalist.

In 2010, the band toured the US three times. The most recent was in April 2010. The band played at the SXSW Festival in Austin, and in clubs like Roxy in LA, Fillmore East at Irving Plaza in New York, Popscene in San Francisco and Metro in Chicago.

On Saturday 29 May 2010, C-mon & Kypski stood at the main stage of the 41st edition of Pinkpop.

== Discography ==
=== Albums ===
- 2002: Vinyl Voodoo, Supertracks
- 2004: C-Mon Cereal, Supertracks
- 2004: Static Traveller, Supertracks
- 2005: Feel1Vibe Mixtape, Supertracks
- 2005: Dutch Rare Food, Supertracks
- 2006: Where The Wild Things Are, Jammm
- 2008: The Complete Jazz Compilation, Jammm
- 2008: The Rock Compilation, PIAS
- 2009: We Are Square, Jammm

=== Singles ===
- 2001: "Junkie HC", Dexdexter Records
- 2002: "Vinyl Voodoo Ep, Supertracks
- 2006: "Bumpy Road"
- 2007: "Make My Day" ft. Pete Philly
- 2007: Bumpy Road" (re-issue)
- 2009: "China"

== Hit list ==
=== Albums ===
Album title	Release date	Charting in the Dutch Album Top 100			Comments
Album title	Release date	Date of entry	Highest	Weeks	Comments
Where the wild things are	2007	25-08-2007	83	1	
We are square	2009	31-10-2009	50	2	

=== Singles ===
Single title	Release date	Charting in the Dutch Top 40			Comments
Single title	Release date	Date of entry	Highest	Weeks	Comments
Make my day	2007	-			met Pete Philly / #91 in de Single Top 100
