= About a Feeling =

Studio album by Summer Heart
- Released: April 25, 2012
- Recorded: December 2011 – February 2012
- Genres: Dream pop, indie pop, lo-fi, new wave
- Length: 30:45
- Labels: Sommarhjärta, Fastcut Records
- Producer: David Alexander

Singles from About a Feeling
- 1. "A Million Times" Released: March 26, 2012

Professional ratings
Review scores
| Source | Rating |
|---|---|
| GAFFA | link |
| MusicBrainz | link |

About a Feeling is the debut album by Summer Heart, released April 25, 2012 by Swedish label Sommarhjärta.

The album was written and recorded between December 2011 and February 2012 in David Alexander's home studio. Alexander plays all the instruments on the record.

A special edition of the album was released in Japan by Fastcut Records. The Japanese edition of the album features the bonus tracks Please Stay, Hold On, and Hit Me Up Again.

== Track listing ==
| No. | Title | Length |
|---|---|---|
| 1. | "Rusty Scars" | 4:24 |
| 2. | "I Wanna Go" | 4:08 |
| 3. | "I Wanted You To Stay On The Other Side" | 4:07 |
| 4. | "A Million Times" | 3:03 |
| 5. | "Los Angeles Lies" | 3:50 |
| 6. | "Kiss Me" | 3:07 |
| 7. | "When Worlds Collide" | 5:03 |
| 8. | "Say Goodbye" | 3:03 |

Japan Edition
| No. | Title | Length |
|---|---|---|
| 9. | "Please Stay" | 3:17 |
| 10. | "Hold On" | 3:35 |
| 11. | "Hit Me Up Again" | 4:57 |
