= Colin Benders =

Dutch techno artist

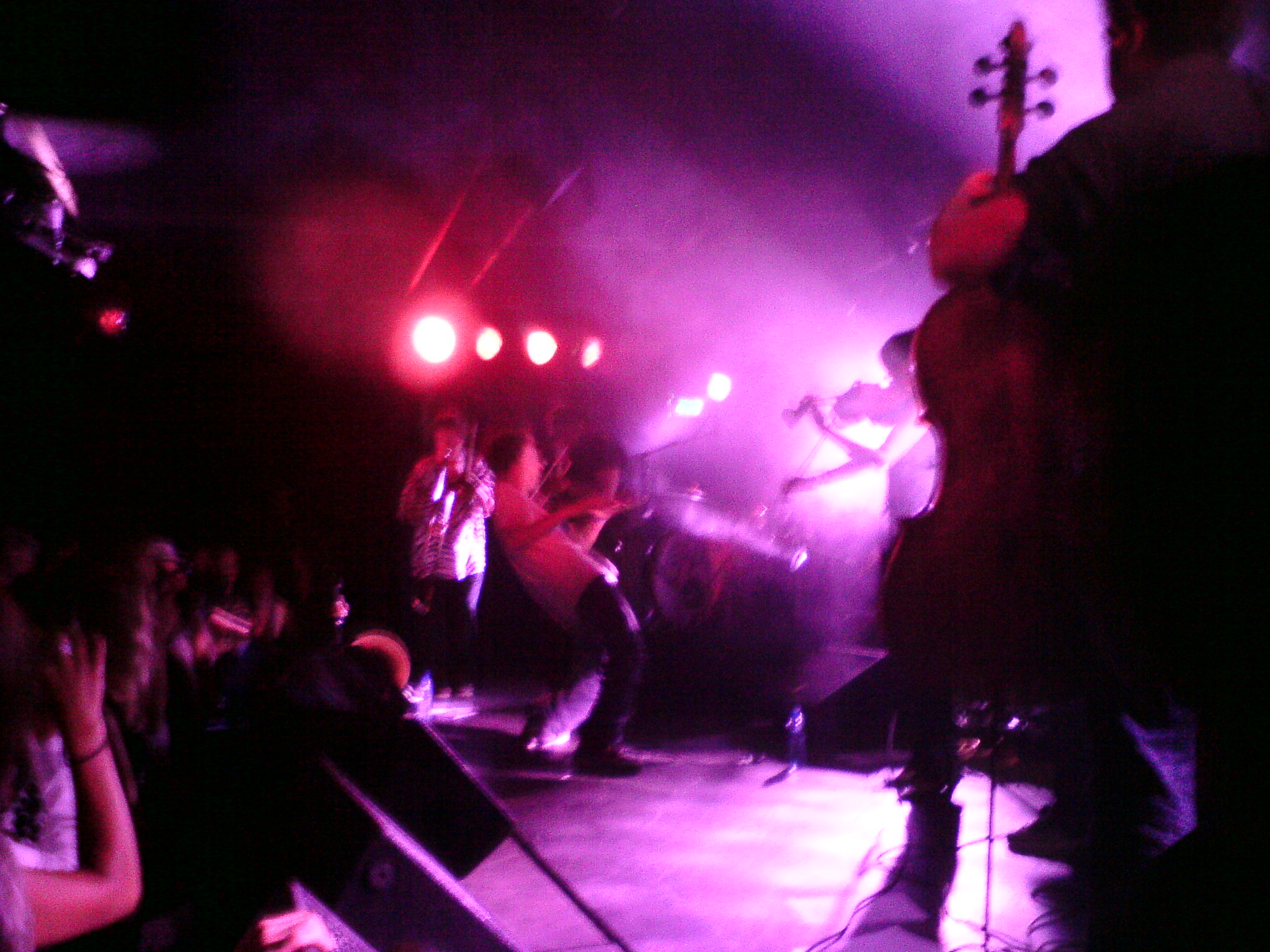
- Kyteman's Hip-Hop Orchestra performing live in 2009

Background information
- Birth name: Colin Benders
- Also known as: Kyteman
- Born: 5 December 1986 (age 38); Utrecht, Netherlands
- Genres: techno, electro, hip-hop, jazz
- Occupation(s): conductor, live electronic performer
- Instrument(s): Modular synthesizer, trumpet, bugle, piano

Colin Benders (born 5 December 1986) is a Dutch musician, best known for his techno music and as a founding member of The Kyteman Orchestra.

== Childhood ==
Benders grew up in Sterrenwijk, Utrecht. Primary school was not easy for Colin due to various diagnoses such as ADHD. At eight years old, he switched school to the Kathedrale Koorschool Utrecht. There he got the chance to develop his musical talents. Benders was the precentor of the choir for a long time, but he quit singing at the age of fifteen.

After primary school, Colin went to the Secondary school for Young Talents, linked to the Royal Conservatory of The Hague. He specialized as a trumpet player. The Royal Conservatory directly granted him special permission to attend their school, but he dropped out after two years.

== Career ==
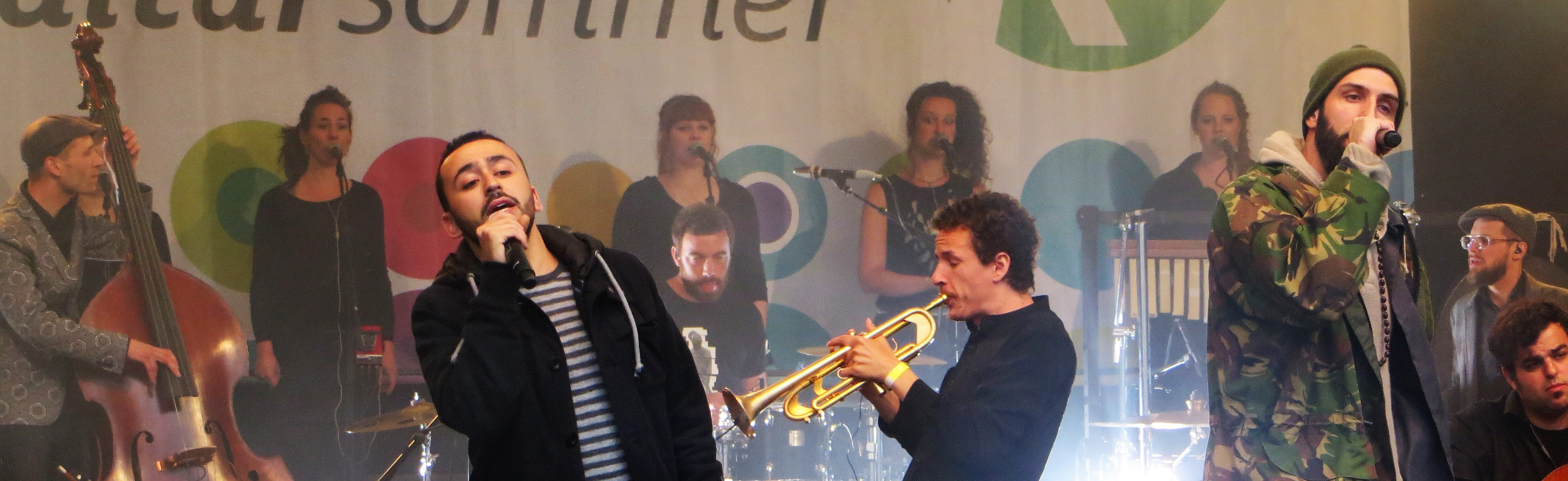
The Kyteman Orchestra, 2013

At the age of eighteen, Colin moved to another part of Utrecht. He spent three years writing and recording his debut album The Hermit Sessions which completed in 2009. Afterward, he toured through Europe with his Kyteman's Hiphop Orchestra.

Since then, he played and toured with Relax, Krezip, Voicst, Wouter Hamel and C-mon & Kypski In October 2010, he played two songs with Sting, Desert Rose and All Would Envy.

=== Techno ===
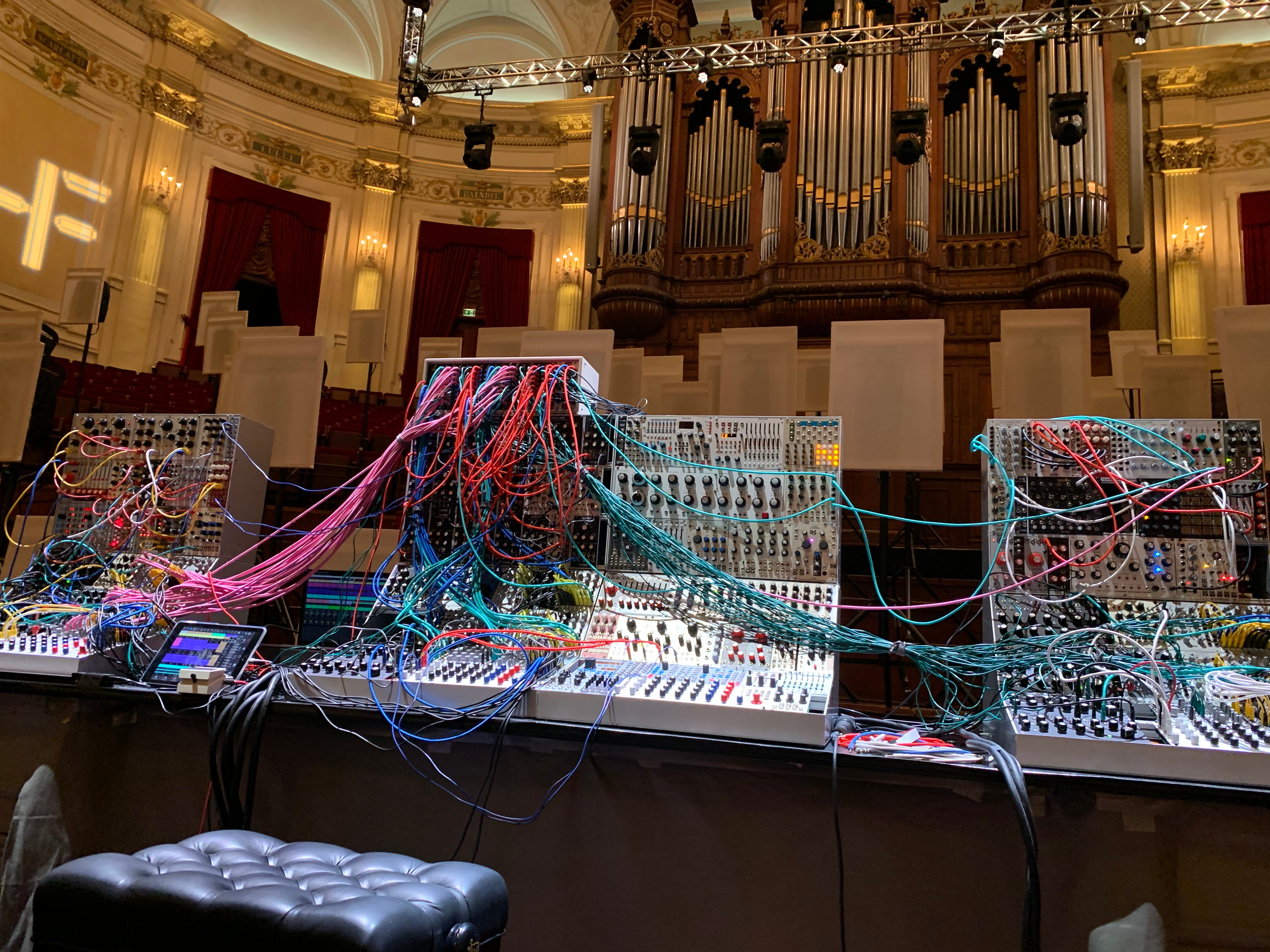
Colin Benders' modular synthesizer in the Concertgebouw, Amsterdam

According to his own statements, around 2012 he gradually reduced his involvement with The Kyteman Orchestra in favor of his discovery of electronic instruments. When the Kyteman Orchestra disbanded, Benders changed course and became an electro and techno artist. Since then he published online sessions. During the COVID-19 lockdowns he occasionally did daily live streams in 2020. Benders uses a modular synthesizer to make live techno music.

== Albums ==
=== Hermit Sessions ===
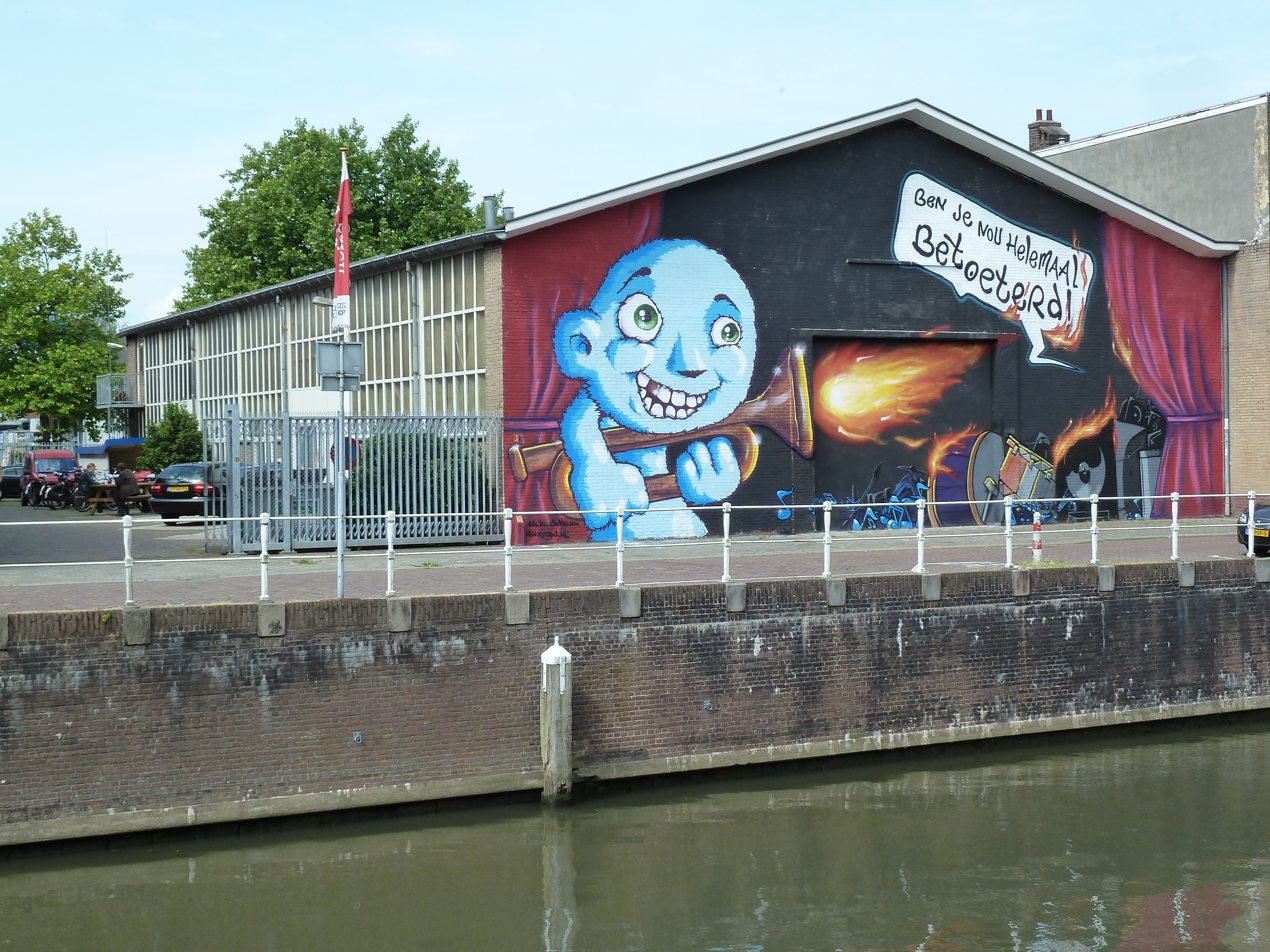
Kyteman's studio on the Utrechtse Vecht.

The Hermit Sessions was released in 2009 and the music was described as a mix of hip-hop and jazz laced with tender melodies and raw beats. The album was a great success in the Netherlands; It has reached the top five of the Dutch Album Charts, sold over 75,000 copies, and has kept a position in the charts for more than two years. With this album, they won all the major music prizes in the Netherlands.

=== The Kyteman Orchestra ===
The Kyteman Orchestra is a hip-hop group consisting of 18 musicians, opera singers and a choir. Benders described the group's sound as "a collection of sounds, somewhere between opera, hip-hop, drum & bass, electro, minimalism and all kinds of other genres that I can't even begin to describe."

The Kyteman Orchestra performed at Dutch festivals and stages, such as the North Sea Jazz Festival and A Campingflight to Lowlands Paradise.

== Discography ==
=== Albums ===
Album title	Release date	Charting in the Dutch Album Top 100			Comments
Album title	Release date	Date of entry	Highest	Weeks	Comments
The Hermit sessions	20-02-2009	28-02-2009	3	104	Platinum
Kytecrash	11-03-2011	19-03-2011	5	20	as Colin Benders / with Eric Vloeimans
The Kyteman Orchestra	30-03-2012	07-04-2012	1 (3 wk)	37	as The Kyteman Orchestra
The jam sessions	17-07-2015	25-07-2015	14	4	as The Kyteman Orchestra

=== Singles ===
Single title	Release date	Charting in the Dutch Top 40			Comments
Single title	Release date	Date of entry	Highest	Weeks	Comments
She Blew like Trumpets	2009	-			with GMB / No. 68 in the Single Top 100
Sorry	2009	17-10-2009	17	5	No. 2 in the Single Top 100
The Mushroom Cloud	2012	-			as The Kyteman Orchestra / No. 32 in the Single Top 100

=== Dvds ===
DVDs with hit listings in the Dutch Music Top 30	Date of appearance	Entry date	Highest Position	Number of weeks	Notes
The Hermit sessions - live	2009	21-11-2009	2	38	as Kyteman's HipHop Orchestra
