= Summer Heart =

Swedish musical artist

- Summer Heart performing live in Oslo

Background information
- Genres: Dream pop, lo-fi, indie pop, hypnagogic pop, electronica
- Years active: 2011-present
- Labels: Perfect, Texture, Sommarhjärta, Fastcut Records, Icons Creating Evil Art

Summer Heart is a Swedish dream pop act and the solo project of singer-songwriter and multi instrumentalist David Alexander Lomelino. He is best known for his nostalgic lo-fi sound

Summer Heart was formed in 2011 just after David Alexander returned to Sweden. His first release, Please Stay EP (2011), gained a lot of attention in the blogosphere. It was topping Hype Machine's charts and got positive reviews in newspapers around the world such as The Guardian and The Star.

After his songs were being picked up by several TV and movie production companies, one of Summer Heart's tracks ended up on NBC TV-series Whitney, which garnered him many listeners outside the blogosphere.

Although Summer Heart is a solo project, Alexander is most often seen on-stage together with friends.

== Discography ==
Albums

- About a Feeling (2012)
- 101 (2017)
- Still Life (2024)

Singles and EPs

- Please Stay EP (2011)
- "Never Let Me Go" (2011)
- My Forever Smile EP (2011)
- "Hit Me Up Again" (2013)
- "Sleep" (2014)
- "Thinkin of U" (2015)
- "The Forbidden" (2016)
- "Ambitions" (2020)
- "Insecurities" (2021)
- "Oceans" (2021)
