= Causes (band) =

Dutch indie-pop band

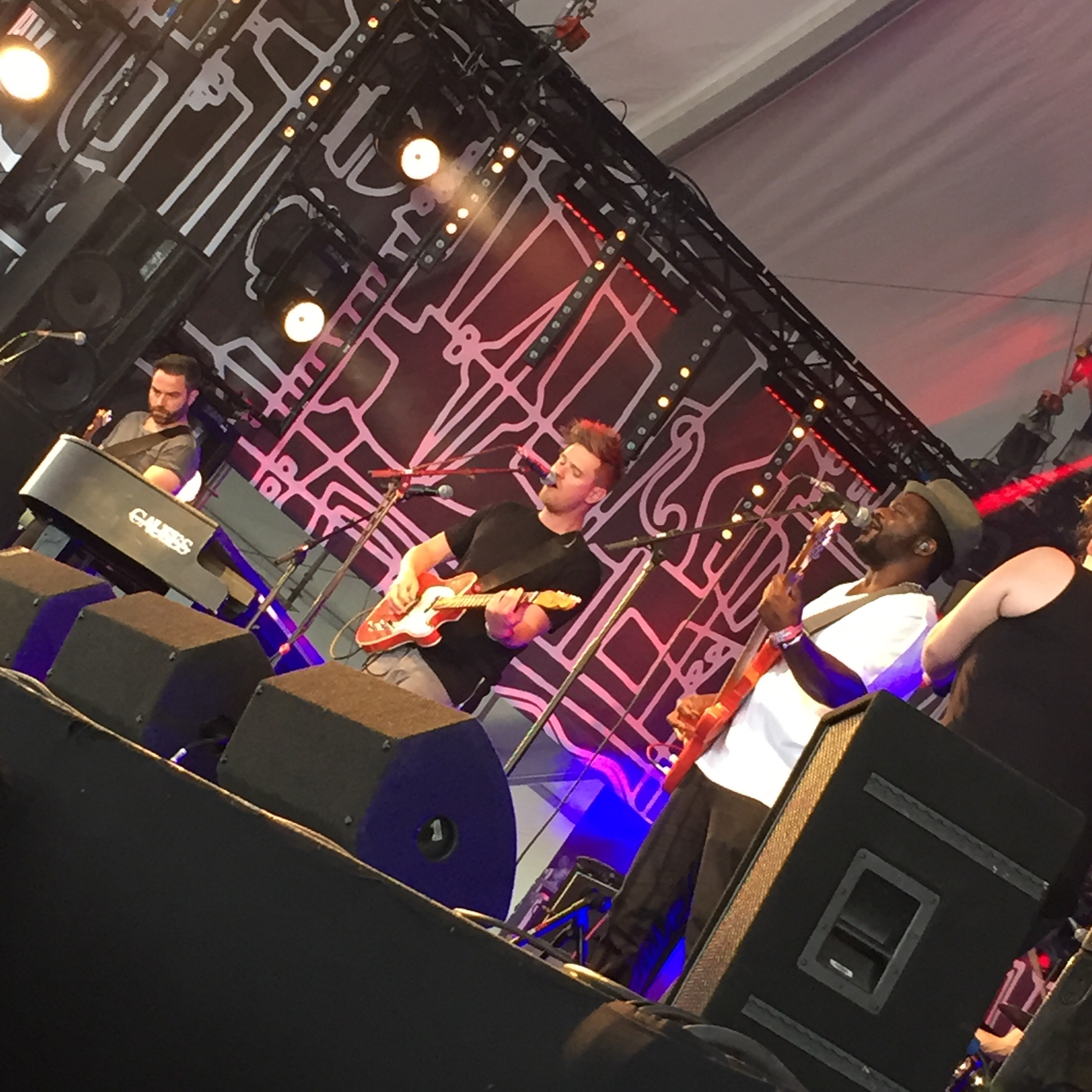
- Causes during a 2015 concert

Background information
- Origin: The Netherlands
- Genres: Pop
- Years active: 2014–2019
- Labels: Year One / RCA, PIAS
- Past members: Rupert Blackman; Jan Schröder; Simon Boeing-Messing; Robert Pronk
- Website: www.causesmusic.com

Causes were a four-piece indie pop band who were based in the Netherlands.

== History ==
The band is composed of British singer-songwriter Rupert Blackman (vocals), Jan Schröder (guitar), Simon Boeing-Messing (drums) and Robert Pronk (bass). Blackman moved to Amsterdam from the UK and started busking on the street. He regularly sold out of homemade CD's and interest quickly garnered. He signed a record deal in Benelux with Play It Again Sam. Soon after he met guitarist Jan Schroder and Causes was swiftly formed.

The band's debut single "Teach Me How To Dance With You" was released in late 2014 in Benelux and proved an immediate success; first being playlisted on Radio 538, with all other major radio stations soon following suit. It quickly gained Platinum status and was followed up by a second, also very successful single "Walk on Water" which was premiered with a performance on 3FM June 4 alongside another RTL Late Night TV performance. Causes were invited back to RTL Late Night the following week to close the season finale. The band went on to sign a deal with Year One / RCA records in July 2015 and "To The River" was released on 9 October, their first release outside Benelux.

2015 held a busy summer of live shows and festivals including Pinkpop and Appelpop as well as a headline show at the Paradiso in Amsterdam. Causes' debut album was produced by Ian Grimble (Bears Den, Daughter) and was released in 2016 through RCA/PIAS. The band played the Eurosonic and Noorderslag festivals in January 2017.

On 5 April 2019, the band announced that they were dissolving.

== Discography ==
=== Albums ===
- Under Bridges That You Built for Me (5 February 2016)
- Wake Me Up So I Can Dream (26 October 2018)
