= PIAS Recordings =

Anglo-Belgian independent record label

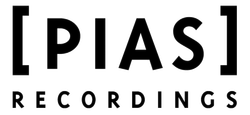
- Parent company: Universal Music Group
- Founded: 1982; 44 years ago
- Founder: Kenny Gates; Michel Lambot
- Distributors: PIAS, Virgin Music Group in the U.S.
- Genre: Rock; alternative rock; electronic; folk; experimental
- Country of origin: United Kingdom; Belgium
- Location: London; Brussels
- Official website: playitagainsam.net

PIAS Recordings, also known as Play It Again Sam, stylized as [PIAS] is a British-Belgian record label founded in 1982 by Kenny Gates and Michel Lambot, In September 2024, the company was acquired by Universal Music Group. Play It Again Sam expanded along with other European independent labels in the early 1980s. Play It Again Sam's prominent early artists were electronic-rock acts like Front 242, Meat Beat Manifesto and The Young Gods. They later added artists such as The Sound, Soulwax/2ManyDJ's, Sigur Rós and Mogwai.

== History ==
The first release on the label in 1984 was the mini album Faces in the Fire by the cult experimental psychedelic band The Legendary Pink Dots. This was immediately followed by the Four Your Ears Only EP, featuring Red Lorry Yellow Lorry, Red Guitars, Party Day and Luddites. This laid the ground for releases from many other artists with very diverse musical backgrounds and geographical origins, including the Butthole Surfers, Parade Ground, The Neon Judgement, The Sound, Skinny Puppy, Taxi Girl, Bill Pritchard and The Cassandra Complex. In 1988 the label released the album Front By Front by Front 242 including the single "Headhunter" (with a video directed by Anton Corbijn).

The year 1983 marked a distribution agreement in which Chicago-based Wax Trax! Records distributed Play It Again Sam releases in the USA. The agreement continued into the 1990s. In 1999, Play It Again Sam signed a German distribution deal to distribute London-based dance label Mo' Wax's releases.

In 2000, the label moved from Brussels to London and was renamed PIAS Recordings. PIAS Recordings released the first two albums by Icelandic band Sigur Rós. The Scottish band Mogwai signed to PIAS in 2001.

PIAS announced at the end of 2010 that it would be re-launching Play It Again Sam as a label.

In November 2022, Universal Music Group purchased a 49% stake in [PIAS] (including [PIAS] Recordings).

== Current roster ==
- Agnes Obel
- Andy Burrows
- Arcane Roots
- Balthazar
- Black M
- Blanche
- Bohren & der Club of Gore
- Brodka
- Cameron Winter
- Champs
- Circa Waves
- Courting
- Day Wave
- Dead Can Dance
- dEUS
- Editors
- Ella Eyre
- Eliza
- Elliot Moss
- Eric McKenna
- Failure
- Fews
- Foxes
- Geese
- Ghostpoet
- Harper Simon
- Jean-Louis Murat
- Jesswar
- The Jezabels
- Keaton Henson
- Joan As Police Woman
- Lisa Mitchell
- Lord Huron
- Lucius
- Lykke Li
- Mew
- Minor Victories
- Pixies
- Public Service Broadcasting
- Rose Gray
- Salvatore Adamo
- Shura
- The Slow Show
- Soap&Skin
- Soulwax
- Twin Wild
- Wave Racer
- White Lies

== Former artists ==
- Band of Skulls
- Causes
- Cabaret Voltaire
- Crystal Castles
- The Creatures (Siouxsie Sioux's second band)
- The Darkness
- Dinosaur Jr.
- Drive-By Truckers
- Enter Shikari
- I Am Kloot
- The Jim Jones Revue
- Jurassic 5
- Maxïmo Park
- The Middle East
- Mogwai
- My Morning Jacket
- My Vitriol
- The Pains of Being Pure at Heart
- Placebo
- Rodrigo y Gabriela
- Seasick Steve
- Sigur Rós
- Steve Burns
- Texas
- Trisomie 21
- Young Guns
- Zulu Winter

== See also ==
- PIAS Group
