= Roller Coaster (Danny Vera song) =

2019 single by Danny Vera

Single by Danny Vera

from the album Pressure Makes Diamonds
- Released: 13 March 2019
- Genre: Americana; country
- Length: 4:29
- Label: Excelsior Recordings
- Songwriter(s): Danny Vera; Mercy John
- Producer(s): Vera; Frans Hagenaars

Danny Vera singles chronology
"Every Time" (2019)	"Roller Coaster" (2019)	"Oblivious Desire" (2020)

"Roller Coaster" is a song by Dutch singer-songwriter Danny Vera. The song was released on 13 March 2019 as the fourth single from his seventh album Pressure Makes Diamonds.

The song first charted in 2019. In its first year, the song received the fourth-most votes in the Netherlands' annual Top 2000 greatest songs of all time poll, breaking the record for the highest entry. The media coverage around this resulted in the song re-entering the Dutch Top 40 and peaking at No. 14 in 2020. "Roller Coaster" was then voted in at number one in 2020.

The song also quickly became one of the most popular funeral songs in the Netherlands.

== Background ==
The song was written by Danny Vera with Mercy John (John Verhoeven), who plays the guitar on the song. It was produced by Vera and Frans Hagenaars.

Vera wrote the song about the ups and downs of life, which he compares to a roller coaster. In the lyrics, he sings about a growing magnolia. This referenced a magnolia tree that Vera's father planted in the garden for Vera's mother, who died when Vera was 24.

Mercy John's guitar playing was inspired by him wanting to alter the chords of the Townes Van Zandt song "If I Needed You", which he heard on the Flemish drama film The Broken Circle Breakdown. It has been described as country and Americana.

Originally, Vera did not think "Roller Coaster" was good enough to release as a single, but after seeing the warm reception it received from performing it on the broadcaster Omroep MAX, he changed his mind. NPO Radio 2 DJ Rob Stenders chose the song as the Topsong on Stenders Platenbonanza.

== Reception ==
The song made history by entering the annual NPO Radio 2 Top 2000 greatest songs of all time countdown at number four in 2019, the highest entrance ever for a song, surpassing Adele's "Someone like You", which entered at number six in 2011. Among Dutch artists, the previous highest entrance was Marco Borsato's "Rood", which entered at number 17 in 2006.

In 2020, it was voted number one, only the second time for a Dutch artist. In 2021, it fell down to number two behind Queen's "Bohemian Rhapsody", which had been number one for a majority of the years.

The results in 2020 surprised Top 2000 founder Kees Toering, who theorised that it was the most-voted song because "during this corona time, people want something calm. They are looking for connection, peace."

"Roller Coaster" also became one of the most played songs during funerals in the Netherlands.

== Commercial performance ==
"Roller Coaster" debuted on the Dutch Top 40 at No. 35 in April 2019, when Vera was 41 years old. It was his first single to make the chart. On 21 September 2019, its 24th week on the chart, it became the song that spent the most weeks on the chart without ever reaching the top 20, peaking at No. 21. It left the chart on 19 October 2019 after 27 weeks.

However, on the final week of 2019, the song re-entered the chart at No. 27 and rose to No. 19 in the first week of 2020. This was due to renewed interest in the song after its surprise entrance at number four on the annual Top 2000. It ultimately peaked at No. 14.

On the Dutch Single Top 100, it remained on the chart for 162 weeks, the most in chart history.

== Charts ==
=== Weekly charts ===
Weekly chart performance for "Roller Coaster"
Chart (2019–20)	Peak position
Belgium (Ultratop 50 Flanders)	22
Netherlands (Dutch Top 40)	14
Netherlands (Single Top 100)	5

=== Yearly charts ===
Yearly chart performance for "Roller Coaster"
Chart (2019)	Position
Netherlands (Dutch Top 40)	59
Netherlands (Single Top 100)	39

Chart (2020)	Position
Belgium (Ultratop 50 Flanders)	79
Netherlands (Single Top 100)	10
