= Michiel Veenstra =

Dutch radio DJ on KINK (born 1976)

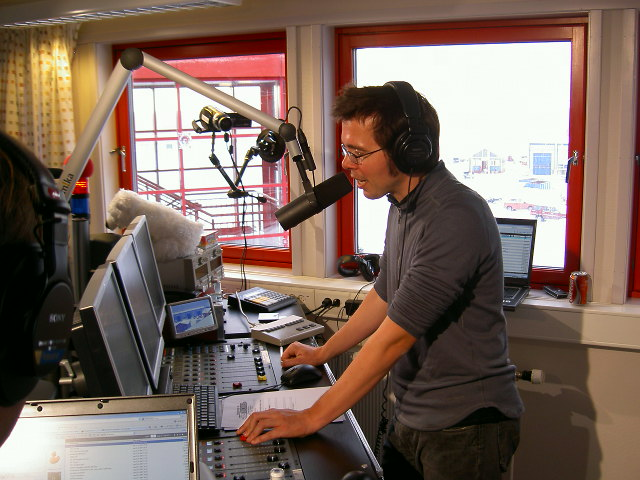
- Michiel Veenstra
- Born: 6 March 1976 (age 50); Almelo
- Occupation: Disc jockey

Arjan Michiel Sander Veenstra (Almelo, 6 March 1976) is a Dutch radio DJ on KINK. He presents the program Michiel every Monday to Friday, between 9.00 and 12.00

== Career ==
He started with his own show at Regio FM, the local radio station of Wierden. He presented the Saturday night show Lucky Night as well as a daily morning show Wierden wordt wakker (Wierden wakes up). Via another local station, HotFM, he moved to work for nationwide broadcaster Radio 538 in 1997, where he worked as a producer with DJs Rick van Velthuysen, Erik de Zwart, Wessel van Diepen en Jeroen Nieuwenhuize. In March 1999 he started with his own show for the station, and worked with Nieuwenhuize for a morning show, The Morning J.E.M.

In 2000, Veenstra left Radio 538 and started work for Kink FM with the shows Sunday Bloody Sunday and Outlaw Classix. When the parent company Veronica restarted Radio Veronica in 2002, Veenstra transferred to this new station. The station transmitted on a small scale through cable only, and for over a year, he was the only DJ on air. During the summer of 2003, Radio Veronica was merged with Sky Radio. At the new Radio Veronica, Veenstra presented Veenstra uit de veren (Veenstra gets up) every morning between 04.00 and 06.00. With Alexander Stevens, he was also a sidekick for the Curry & the Crew show with Adam Curry from 6.00 to 9.00. For the show, Veenstra presented a week-long radio show from army base Camp Smitty in Iraq and from a Las Vegas night club, among other places. When Adam Curry left in September 2004, Veenstra started working with successor Jeroen van Inkel. Veenstra also presented a new Friday night show, the Veenstravaganza! show. He received a young talent award from the Marconi Awards jury.

In 2005, Veenstra moved stations again, to 3FM, where he made the evening show MetMichiel for the NTR. Starting September 2006, he could also be heard on Friday night, together with Gerard Ekdom, in the Ekstra Weekend show. Michiel is also the regular stand-in for Giel Beelen, for the morning show GIEL, as well as the Friday night show Nachtegiel. Also, Veenstra was heard substituting for Rob Stenders in his show Stenders Eetvermaak, which they would rename Veenstra's Vreetvermaak (Roughly translated: Veenstra's Munch Madness).

On Friday 27 April 2007, Michiel Veenstra wrote radio history by being the first ever radio maker to host a live radio show from the North Pole. This was for the Noordpool FM project.

Michiel Veenstra's voice can also be heard in multiple NPS TV programs.
