= Top 2000 =

Dutch radio program

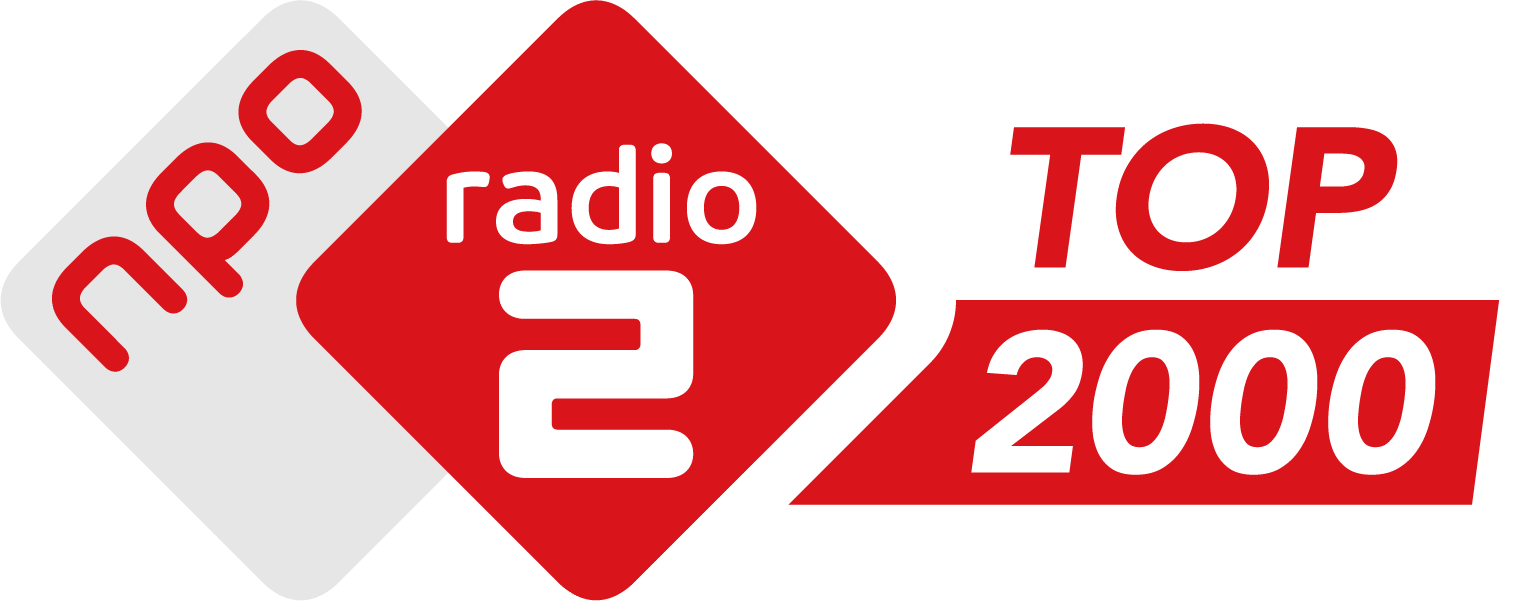
- Genre: Pop; rock; dance; metal; hip-hop; jazz
- Running time: 7 days (168 hours; 25 December midnight - 31 December midnight) for 24 hours a day, only interrupted by short hourly news bulletins and commercials
- Country of origin: Netherlands
- Language: Dutch
- Home station: NPO Radio 2 (broadcast by NTR)
- TV adaptations: Top 2000 a Gogo
- Hosted by: Various, multiple per edition
- Created by: Kees Toering
- Recording studio: Netherlands Institute for Sound and Vision, Hilversum
- Original release: 26 December 1999
- No. of episodes: 26
- Audio format: FM, cable, satellite, DAB, DTT and internet
- Opening theme: A remix of Tommy Overture (The Who)
- Website: NPO Radio 2 - Top 2000
- Podcast: NPO Radio 2 player

The Top 2000 is an annual Dutch marathon radio programme that plays the 2,000 most popular songs listeners have deemed the best of all time. Hosted by the station NPO Radio 2 since 1999, it has since become "an indispensable part of the collective Dutch memory".

The show runs 24 hours a day, starting on Christmas and ending on New Year's Eve, functioning as a countdown to the new year. A significant part of the Netherlands' population listens to the broadcast each year; during the 2023 edition, it had a national radio market share of 41.1 percent. In regard of its popularity and notoriety, the show is often called de lijst der lijsten, the chart of charts.

First held in 1999 to inaugurate the new millennium, the Top 2000 was intended to be a one-time event. It became immensely popular. Following this success, Radio 2 decided to make it an annual programme. The broadcast initially started at midnight on the day after Christmas (Dutch: Tweede Kerstdag, also known as Boxing Day), and since 2020 it has begun on the midnight of Christmas Day. It continues until midnight of New Year's Eve. The voting period lasts a week, and the full list is revealed prior to the broadcast. Queen's "Bohemian Rhapsody" has been the number-one voted song in all but five years.

The show is hosted in a temporary studio called the Top 2000 Café at the Netherlands Institute of Sound and Vision in Hilversum. Visitors are able to purchase a timed ticket to enter the studio. Because of the popularity of the show and the small size of the studio, visitors are only allowed to stay for a limited period of time. The tickets have been known to sell out quickly.

== History ==
=== The first list ===
In the summer of 1998, Radio 2 station manager Kees Toering wanted to commemorate the new millennium by presenting a listener-compiled list of the 2000 best songs of the 20th century, aired between Christmas and New Year's Day. In September 1999, he presented this idea to his colleagues, who wanted to beat the listening figures of competitor Sky Radio. However, many of his colleagues were skeptical because the station did not broadcast at night, it seemed unlikely that listeners would tune in during the late hours, and because Sky Radio dominated the market share during Christmas time because of their own special programming. DJ Frits Spits gave a passionate speech which helped convince the critics.

The voting process was advertised on Spits, a free newspaper with a circulation of 450,000 distributed mostly amongst public transportation passengers. There was a coupon where one could write ten songs, cut it out and send to the station. It took days to manually record the results, and the top song was Queen's "Bohemian Rhapsody". The first song ever broadcast was John Denver's "Thank God I'm a Country Boy" at No. 2000 on the midnight of 26 December 1999. It was originally intended to be a one-time event, but the listening figures were higher than expected and the station decided to continue.

=== 2000s ===
In 2000, Jeanne Kooijmans became the first female DJ to present the Top 2000, although more women worked behind the scenes. In the early years, the final hours of the broadcast were pre-recorded. Then in 2004, it was broadcast in Almere on the houseboat of DJ Hans Schiffers. In 2005, "Bohemian Rhapsody" was knocked off the top spot for the first time, replaced by "Avond" by Boudewijn de Groot, after a campaign by Radio 2 DJ Bert Kranenbarg. In 2007, there were similar campaigns, one by the regional newspaper Dagblad van het Noorden to push Groningen singer Ede Staal to number one with "'t Het nog nooit zo donker west" and another by Christians on the social media platform Hyves to push Hillsong United's "Tell the World". Votes for both were rejected because they received little, if any, attention in the previous years, and Toering said "The Top 2000 is not a plaything of any interest group whatsoever."

In 2009, the Top 2000 began broadcasting 12 hours earlier at noon on Christmas Day.

=== 2010s ===
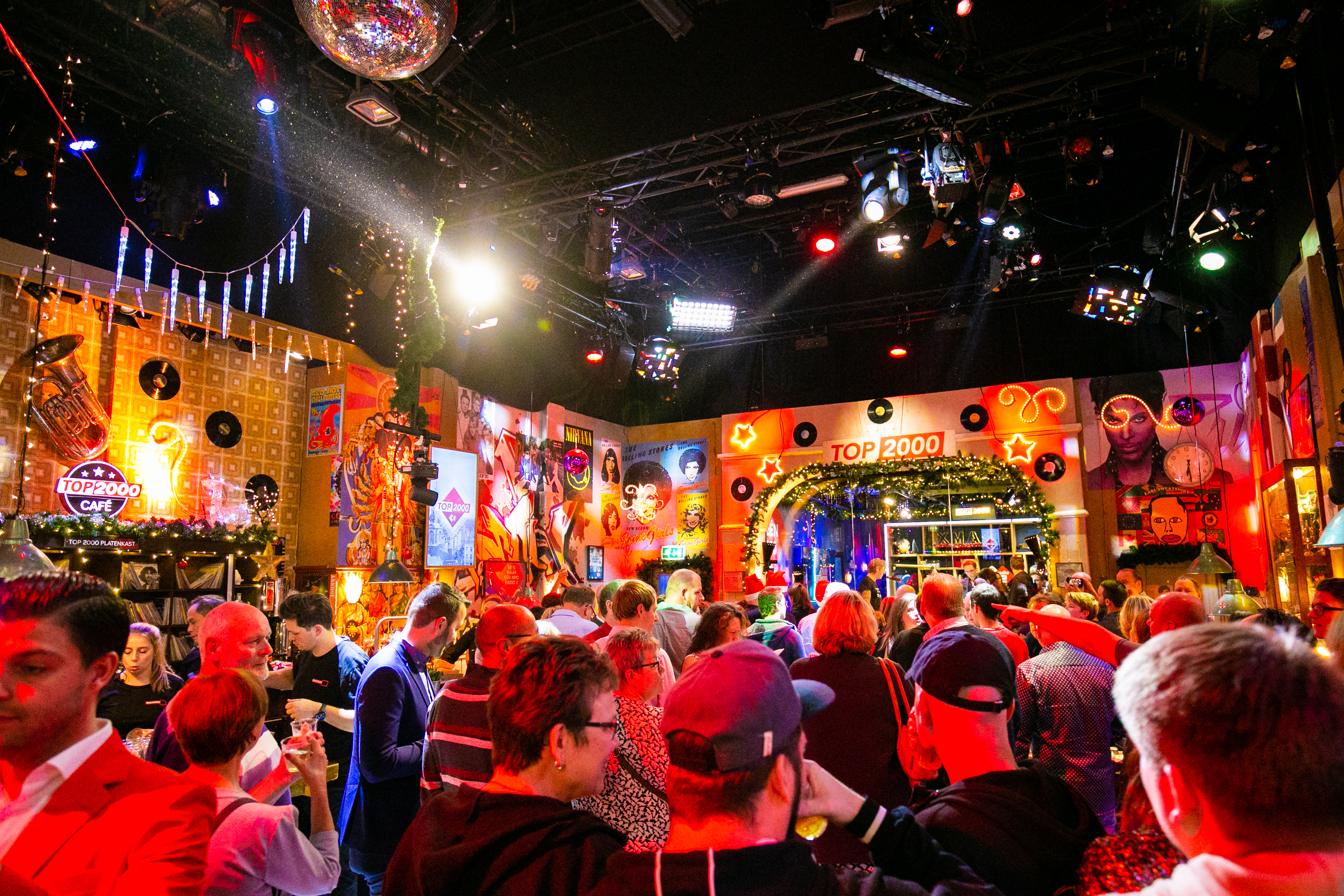
The Top 2000 Café in 2018

Beginning in 2010, the broadcast was held at the Top 2000 Café in Hilversum. That year, the Eindhovens Dagblad published an investigation alleging that dozens of songs in had incorrect placements or inaccurately did not make the Top 2000. In 2021, Toering admitted that during the early years of the list, if the vote counts were the same, long songs were deliberately moved to play late in the night and that every hour had to start with an 'upbeat' song as per Dutch radio laws. Toering claimed that "After a couple of years, we stopped doing that. The popularity of the Top 2000 was already so great that the order of records had no influence on listening behavior at all."

In 2011, Dutch astronaut André Kuipers opened the broadcast by announcing No. 2000 from the International Space Station at noon on Christmas. Radio 2 said that a record number of 11.2 million people, or 78% of the Dutch population aged 10 and older, listened to the Top 2000 that year.

In 2017, King Willem-Alexander referenced the Top 2000 in his annual Christmas speech.

In 2018, NPO Radio 2 presented the inaugural "NPO Radio 2 Top 2000 Award", given to the Dutch artist with the highest debuting song in the Top 2000 that year. It would become a yearly tradition. The first award went to Davina Michelle, because her cover of "Duurt te lang" debuted at No. 477.

Beginning in 2018, there were social media campaigns to fix the skewed gender ratio in the Top 2000. This cause gained further attention again in 2023, because only 19% of the total list was female, including just 6% of the top 100. The highest song by a female singer was Miss Montreal's "Door De Wind" at 38th.

In 2019, DJ Rob Stenders made listeners angry by cutting off the song "Wat zou je doen?", by Marco Borsato and Ali B, after just a minute. Stenders was famously not a fan of Borsato's music, but claimed that he did so because of timeslot requirements.

=== 2020s ===
Because of the COVID-19 pandemic, the Top 2000 Café was closed to visitors in 2020 and 2021 before reopening to the public in 2022.

Beginning in 2020, the broadcast began earlier than ever, starting at midnight on Christmas, to allow for the playing of more longer album versions in place of their shortened radio edits.

In 2020, DJ Ruud de Wild was criticized for pronouncing the title of the song "Niggas in Paris" uncensored while presenting. He also said the word "nigga" in other instances around the playing of the song.

In 2023, the entire top 10 remained in the same position as the year before, for the first time. In honor of the list's 25th anniversary in 2023, the songs which ranked 2,001 to 2,500 were also published as De Extra 500 and broadcast on NPO Radio 2 from 11 to 15 December. That year, a record number of 381 songs by Dutch artists made the list.

In 2025, there was a new record of 397 songs on the list made by Dutch artists. The news stories surrounding this edition of the list included Freek Rikkerink (of Suzan & Freek)'s terminal lung cancer diagnosis, Marco Borsato's acquittal during his child sex abuse trial, the K3 reunion, and the continued popularity of the Beste Zangers reality television program.

== Voting ==
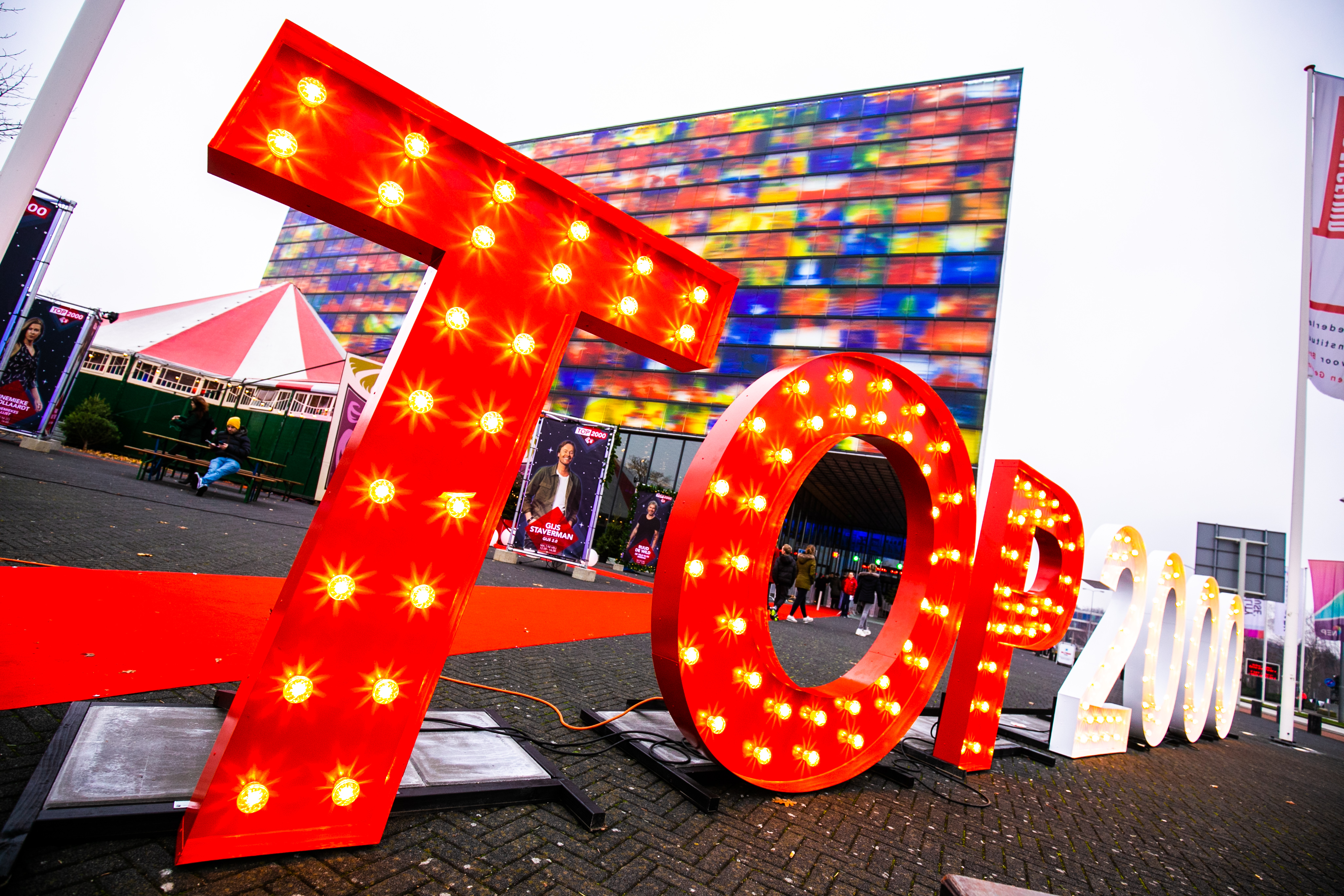
Top 2000 sign at the Beeld en Geluid Museum, Hilversum

During the six-to-seven day broadcast, the station broadcasts a set of 2,000 songs that have been voted on by the show's audience through the Internet to be the "most popular songs of all time". The first year of voting was limited to a set list of 2000 songs that the users ranked themselves. Radio 2 changed the format in 2005 to allow voters to nominate their own suggestions. In 2008, Radio 2 used a different voting format: the votes from the previous nine years were compiled to create a "jubilee list" for the tenth anniversary of the radio show.

People can choose as few as five to as many as 35 songs. The voting period lasts one week, starting late November or early December. People can vote through the radio channel's website on any Internet device during this period. Hosts of the radio channel tour the Netherlands in a bus (Dutch: stembus, which means 'ballot box', but literally translates to 'voting bus') during the period of voting to promote the show. People who visit the bus can also submit their songs there. People living in other countries can also vote for the Top 2000.

Voters can choose which version of a certain song they prefer. These include covers, live performances or full versions whose running time exceed mainstream radio standards. The eventual lineup of the program can contain multiple versions of one song. The longest song to have aired on the Top 2000 is "Tubular Bells (Part I)" by Mike Oldfield, at 25 minutes and 30 seconds.

For listeners to know if or when their favourite songs get aired, the running order, which includes the date and time songs are set to air, is revealed at least a week prior to the start of the show's broadcast. Since the show is aired all day and night, it is not uncommon for some people to set their alarms to listen to certain songs on the show.

The Top 2000 broadcast initially began at midnight of Tweede Kerstdag. From 2009 to 2015, the show started at noon on 25 December, Christmas Day. From 2015 to 2018, it began at 9:00, moved to 8:00 in 2019 and then ultimately to midnight on Christmas in 2020.

== Top 2000 Café ==
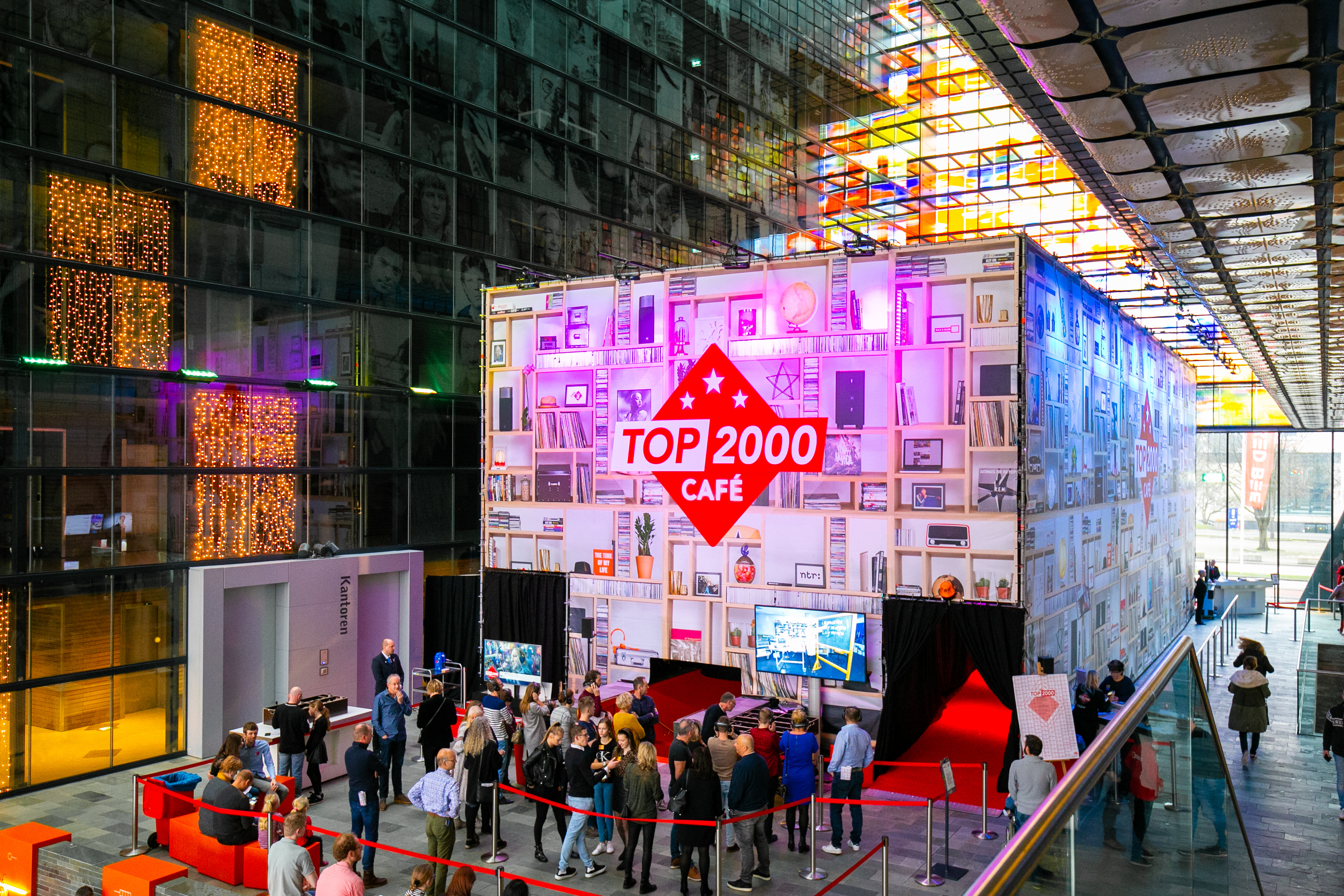
The Top 2000 Café in Hilversum

Beginning in 2010, the Top 2000 Café is built annually in November and early December at the Netherlands Institute of Sound and Vision in Hilversum. In the first year, the museum already broke its daily visitor record when over 2,500 people attended on the Thursday of the broadcast, which was more than the 2007 opening of the audiovisual archive.

Visitors can enter the Top 2000 Café while the list is being broadcast, and tickets to visit go on sale before the list is released so that those in attendance will not know which songs will be played during their time slot. As a result of the show's popularity, a ticket gives visitors access to the Top 2000 Café for just a 50-minute time slot. The café is quickly cleaned in the ten minutes between time slots.

There is room in the café for 150 people in each time slot. In recent years, tickets can only be bought online and not at the door. Prior to this, there were long queues at the Media Park to purchase them. The tickets are known to be difficult to acquire; for example, in 2024, all 25,200 tickets for the Top 2000 Café sold out in less than an hour.

== Statistics ==
"Bohemian Rhapsody" by Queen has traditionally been voted the most popular song on the countdown, with Boudewijn de Groot's "Avond" achieving the top spot in 2005 (as the first Dutch and currently only Dutch-language song to do so), the Eagles' "Hotel California" doing the same in 2010 and 2014 and Danny Vera's "Roller Coaster" in 2020 as the only other songs to ever accomplish the feat.

The song with the highest position in its debut year in the list (from 2000 onwards) is "Roller Coaster", by Dutch country singer Vera, which entered in fourth place. The highest-scoring foreign newcomers were Adele with "Someone Like You" in 2011 and Dermot Kennedy with "Better Days" in 2024, both placing sixth.

In all editions until 2019, The Beatles consistently occupied the most spots in the list, but that year, Queen took over the role as the Top 2000's main supplier with 37 songs.

=== Impact of current events ===
The placement of certain songs in the Top 2000 results have been impacted by current events. In 2009, Dutch singer Ramses Shaffy had three songs in the top 10 because he died three days before the voting closed. Because of Michael Jackson's death in June that year, he tripled the number of songs in the list compared to the year before, from nine to twenty-seven.

In 2015, John Lennon's "Imagine" was voted number one for the first time, in association with the piano act of Davide Martello after the November 2015 Paris attacks. In 2019, "De boer dat is de keerl" (English: The Farmer, That's the Dude) by the Dutch "farmer rock" band Normaal debuted at number nine after a farmers' alliance campaigned on social media to vote for the song. This was seen as a show of support during the farmers' protests that started because of parliament's proposal to halve the country's livestock for the reduction of agricultural pollution in the Netherlands.

In 2021, "A Whiter Shade of Pale" by Procol Harum jumped up 150 spots to number three after the murder of crime reporter Peter R. de Vries, who listed the song as his favourite and had it played at his funeral. That year, Golden Earring's "Radar Love" also entered the top ten for the first time in honor of George Kooymans, who was diagnosed with ALS, prompting his retirement and the band's breakup. In 2024, "Better Days" by Dermot Kennedy debuted at number six because it was a meaningful song to Eva Hermans-Kroot, a Dutch blogger who died of lung cancer during the voting week.

Current events have also caused songs to drop on the list. In 2021, rumors about Marco Borsato's inappropriate behavior led to four of his songs falling off the list entirely. In 2022, Borsato was officially accused of sexual assault, and his songs all dropped by an average of 375 spots. In 2025, Borsato's songs once again saw a rise in positions after he was found not guilty of the charges during that year's voting period. The highest ranked among these was "De Waarheid" (lit. 'The Truth'), taking spot 35, a rise of 1393 positions compared to the year prior.

Social media is also used by voters to get a song into the Top 2000. A notable example is the Pokémon Theme, which entered the chart in 2015 after a successful Facebook campaign and has remained on the chart since.

== Other media ==
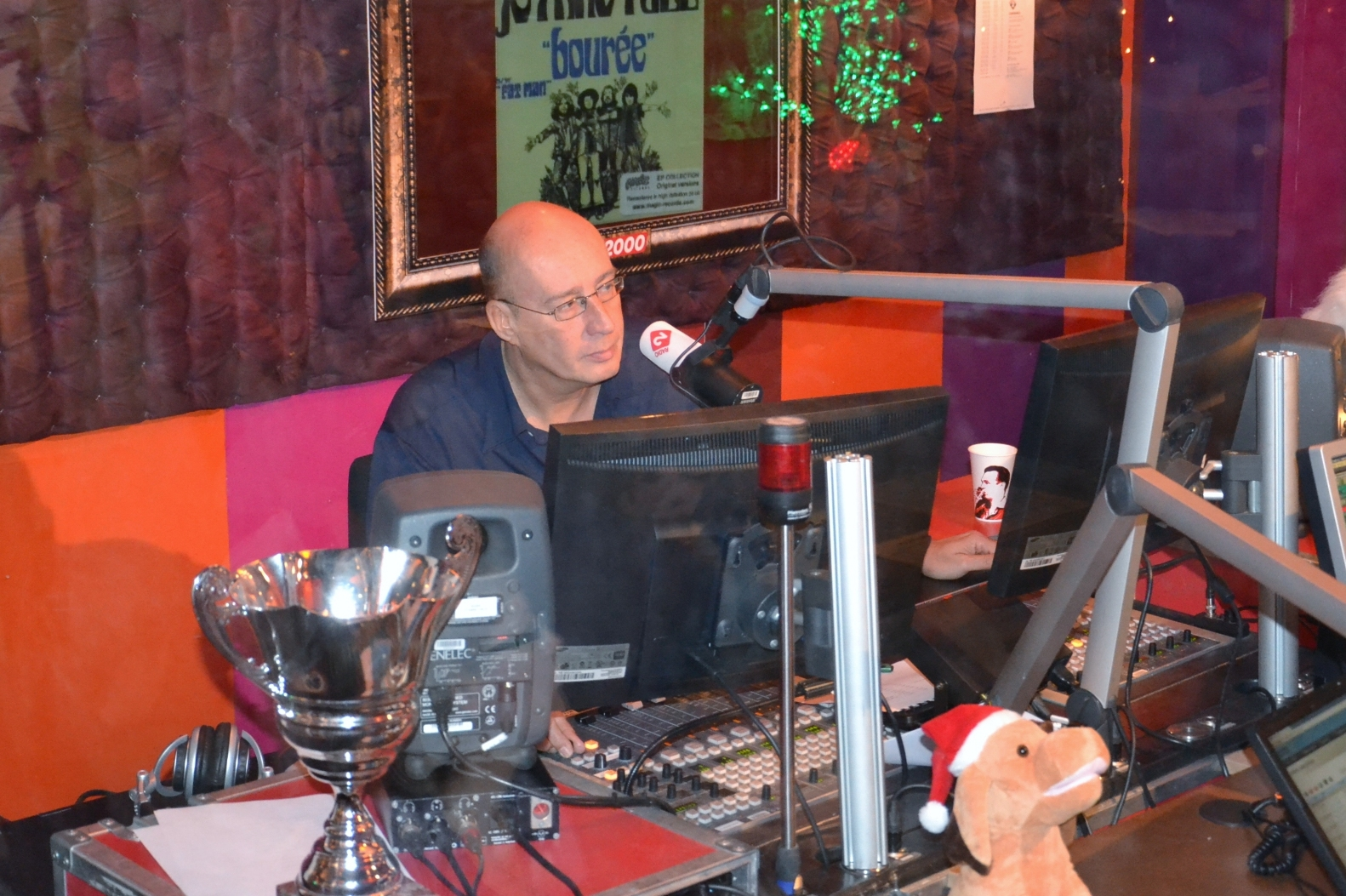
Daniël Dekker presenting the list in 2011

In 2002, the television show Top 2000 a Go-go was introduced to supplement the radio programme. The show contains quizzes, live performances and clips of various songs on the list, as well as interviews with performers and artists featured in the all-time charts. The following year they added Top 2000 in Concert, where various Dutch artists are invited to sing one of their favorite songs, along with one of their own songs. The concert is typically broadcast on New Year's Eve, right after the end of Top 2000. In 2019, Radio 2 DJs released a book about the Top 2000 to celebrate its twentieth anniversary, which was accompanied by a vinyl record.

Other public and commercial radio stations in the Netherlands often have their own take on the end-of-year countdown lists, and similar events have been held by radio stations abroad.

=== Snob 2000 ===
Beginning in 2012, an alternative version of the Top 2000, the "Snob 2000", was created by writers of the Dutch music blog Ondergewaardeerde Liedjes (English: "Underrated Songs"). Each year, the Snob 2000 receives between 60,000 to 75,000 votes. Only songs that are not currently on the formal Top 2000 list are eligible for the Snob 2000. In 2016, the full list was broadcast live on NPO 3FM KX, and since 2017, it airs live on Pinguin Radio. Co-founder Freek Janssen said, "The Snob 2000 started as a kind of joke. The Top 2000 drop-down list was far from complete at the time. For example, there was a lot to choose from the 70s and 80s, but more recent 'classics' were missing. Artists such as Queens of the Stone Age, Daft Punk and Arctic Monkeys were not even represented in the drop-down list at all. Radio 2 has now made a catch-up, because hundreds of songs have now made the switch to the Top 2000."

Starting from 2019, songs that have previously made the number one spot can no longer be voted on, in order to keep the list fresh. These previous winners include: Bruce Springsteen's "Jungleland" (2012), Queens of the Stone Age's "No One Knows" (2013), Arcade Fire's "Rebellion (Lies)" (2014–15), Radiohead's "Exit Music (For a Film)" (2016–18), Porcupine Tree's "Arriving Somewhere But Not Here" (2019) and "Anesthetize" (2022), The War on Drugs' "An Ocean in Between the Waves" (2020), dEUS' "Instant Street" (2021), Nick Cave and the Bad Seeds' "Jubilee Street" (2023) and The Sound's "Winning" (2024).

== Hosts ==
=== Current ===
- Bart Arens (since 2015)
- Tim Op het Broek (since 2025)
- Tannaz Hajeby (since 2024)
- Jeroen van Inkel (since 2020)
- Klaas van Kruistum (since 2026)
- Daniël Lippens (since 2024)
- Morad El Ouakili (since 2022)
- Paul Rabbering (2018–2020, since 2022)
- Jorien Renkema (since 2026)
- Annemieke Schollaardt (since 2017)
- Roelof de Vries (since 2026)
- Ruud de Wild (since 2016)
- Emmely de Wilt (since 2019)

=== Former ===
- Marc Adriani (2009–2012, 2014)
- Giel Beelen (2020-2021)
- Jurgen van den Berg (2011)
- Leo Blokhuis (2019)
- Carolien Borgers (2020-2021)
- Cobus Bosscha (2009)
- Evelien de Bruijn (2016–2018)
- Daniël Dekker (1999–2008, 2011, 2013)
- Gerard Ekdom (2015–2017)
- Sjors Fröhlich (1999)
- Wouter van der Goes (2014-2023)
- Sander Guis (2011–2013)
- Bert Haandrikman (2002–2015)
- Sander de Heer (2007–2014)
- Desiree van der Heiden (2022-2024)
- Tom Herlaar (2004)
- Marisa Heutink (2016)
- Ruud Hermans (2001, 2003–2004)
- Frank van 't Hof (2015-2023)
- Jeroen Kijk in de Vegte (2001–2002, 2020-2025)
- Corné Klijn (2011, 2015)
- Kasper Kooij (2012–2013)
- Bert Kranenbarg (1999–2008, 2010, 2012)
- Pedro van Looij (2000–2001)
- Ferry Maat (1999–2000)
- Riks Ozinga (2001–2002)
- Jan-Willem Roodbeen (2006–2012, 2014–2018, 2020-2025)
- Hans Schiffers (1999–2014)
- Cielke Sijben (2017)
- Hans Smit (2004–2006)
- Frits Spits (1999–2000, 2002, 2005–2008)
- Stefan Stasse (1999–2010, 2012, 2015–2018)
- Gijs Staverman (2013-2023)
- Ron Stoeltie (1999–2002, 2004–2008)
- Henk van Steeg (2011–2013)
- Rob Stenders (2009, 2015–2016, 2018–2019)
- Harjo Thijs (1999)
- Roderick Veelo (2003)
- Rick van Velthuysen (2018–2019, 2021)
- Jasper de Vries (2014–2015, 2024)
- Alfred van de Wege (2010–2012)
- Jeffrey Willems (1999–2000, 2002–2005)

== The top 10 ==
Year / Position	1st	2nd	3rd	4th	5th	6th	7th	8th	9th	10th
1999	Queen "Bohemian Rhapsody"	Eagles "Hotel California"	Deep Purple "Child in Time"	Led Zeppelin "Stairway to Heaven"	Meat Loaf "Paradise by the Dashboard Light"	The Beatles "Yesterday"	John Lennon "Imagine"	The Rolling Stones "Angie"	Simon & Garfunkel "Bridge Over Troubled Water"	Procol Harum "A Whiter Shade of Pale"
2000	Queen "Bohemian Rhapsody"	Deep Purple "Child in Time"	Led Zeppelin "Stairway to Heaven"	Eagles "Hotel California"	Meat Loaf "Paradise by the Dashboard Light"	The Beatles "Hey Jude"	John Lennon "Imagine"	The Beatles "Yesterday"	The Rolling Stones "Angie"	Guns N' Roses "November Rain"
2001	Queen "Bohemian Rhapsody"	Deep Purple "Child in Time"	Eagles "Hotel California"	Led Zeppelin "Stairway to Heaven"	Meat Loaf "Paradise by the Dashboard Light"	The Animals "House of the Rising Sun"	Dire Straits "Brothers in Arms"	Billy Joel "Goodnight Saigon"	The Beatles "Hey Jude"	Dire Straits "Sultans of Swing"
2002	Queen "Bohemian Rhapsody"	Deep Purple "Child in Time"	Eagles "Hotel California"	Led Zeppelin "Stairway to Heaven"	Meat Loaf "Paradise by the Dashboard Light"	The Animals "House of the Rising Sun"	Dire Straits "Private Investigations"	The Alan Parsons Project "Old and Wise"	Dire Straits "Brothers in Arms"	The Doors "Riders on the Storm"
2003	Queen "Bohemian Rhapsody"	Eagles "Hotel California"	Deep Purple "Child in Time"	Led Zeppelin "Stairway to Heaven"	Meat Loaf "Paradise by the Dashboard Light"	Guns N' Roses "November Rain"	The Animals "House of the Rising Sun"	Boudewijn de Groot "Avond"	The Alan Parsons Project "Old and Wise"	The Rolling Stones "Angie"
2004	Queen "Bohemian Rhapsody"	Eagles "Hotel California"	Deep Purple "Child in Time"	Led Zeppelin "Stairway to Heaven"	Boudewijn de Groot "Avond"	Meat Loaf "Paradise by the Dashboard Light"	Guns N' Roses "November Rain"	The Animals "House of the Rising Sun"	John Lennon "Imagine"	Coldplay "Clocks"
2005	Boudewijn de Groot "Avond"	Queen "Bohemian rhapsody"	Eagles "Hotel California"	Deep Purple "Child in Time"	Led Zeppelin "Stairway to Heaven"	Meat Loaf "Paradise by the Dashboard Light"	Coldplay "Clocks"	The Animals "House of the Rising Sun"	The Alan Parsons Project "Old and Wise"	Guns N' Roses "November Rain"
2006	Queen "Bohemian Rhapsody"	Boudewijn de Groot "Avond"	Eagles "Hotel California"	Deep Purple "Child in Time"	Led Zeppelin "Stairway to Heaven"	U2 "One"	Meat Loaf "Paradise by the Dashboard Light"	Pink Floyd "Wish You Were Here"	Coldplay "Clocks"	Metallica "Nothing Else Matters"
2007	Queen "Bohemian Rhapsody"	Boudewijn de Groot "Avond"	Eagles "Hotel California"	Deep Purple "Child in Time"	Led Zeppelin "Stairway to Heaven"	Coldplay "Clocks"	The Animals "House of the Rising Sun"	U2 "One"	The Alan Parsons Project "Old and Wise"	Meat Loaf "Paradise by the Dashboard Light"
2008 (Note: This year, the list consisted of all votes of the previous nine editions added together, and no new votes could be cast. "Top 2000 houdt stembussen dit jaar gesloten" (in Dutch). 3 November 2008.)	Queen "Bohemian Rhapsody"	Eagles "Hotel California"	Boudewijn de Groot "Avond"	Deep Purple "Child in Time"	Led Zeppelin "Stairway to Heaven"	Meat Loaf "Paradise by the Dashboard Light"	The Animals "House of the Rising Sun"	The Alan Parsons Project "Old and Wise"	Guns N' Roses "November Rain"	U2 "One"
2009	Queen "Bohemian Rhapsody"	Eagles "Hotel California"	Boudewijn de Groot "Avond"	Led Zeppelin "Stairway to Heaven"	Deep Purple "Child in Time"	Ramses Shaffy & Liesbeth List "Pastorale"	Ramses Shaffy "Zing, Vecht, Huil, Bid, Lach, Werk en Bewonder"	Coldplay "Clocks"	Pink Floyd "Wish You Were Here"	Ramses Shaffy "Laat Me"
2010	Eagles "Hotel California"	Queen "Bohemian Rhapsody"	Boudewijn de Groot "Avond"	Deep Purple "Child in Time"	Led Zeppelin "Stairway to Heaven"	Pink Floyd "Wish You Were Here"	Coldplay "Viva la Vida"	Coldplay "Clocks"	Meat Loaf "Paradise by the Dashboard Light"	The Alan Parsons Project "Old and Wise"
2011	Queen "Bohemian Rhapsody"	Eagles "Hotel California"	Deep Purple "Child in Time"	Boudewijn de Groot "Avond"	Led Zeppelin "Stairway to Heaven"	Adele "Someone Like You"	Pink Floyd "Wish You Were Here"	Coldplay "Clocks"	Coldplay "Viva la Vida"	Bruce Springsteen "The River"
2012	Queen "Bohemian Rhapsody"	Eagles "Hotel California"	Led Zeppelin "Stairway to Heaven"	Deep Purple "Child in Time"	Boudewijn de Groot "Avond"	Pink Floyd "Wish You Were Here"	Pink Floyd "Shine On You Crazy Diamond"	Adele "Someone Like You"	Coldplay "Clocks"	Pink Floyd "Comfortably Numb"
2013	Queen "Bohemian Rhapsody"	Eagles "Hotel California"	Led Zeppelin "Stairway to Heaven"	Deep Purple "Child in Time"	Boudewijn de Groot "Avond"	Pink Floyd "Wish You Were Here"	Bruce Springsteen "The River"	Pink Floyd "Comfortably Numb"	Metallica "Nothing Else Matters"	Pink Floyd "Shine On You Crazy Diamond"
2014	Eagles "Hotel California"	Queen "Bohemian Rhapsody"	Led Zeppelin "Stairway to Heaven"	Deep Purple "Child in Time"	Boudewijn de Groot "Avond"	Pink Floyd "Wish You Were Here"	Billy Joel "Piano Man"	Pink Floyd "Comfortably Numb"	Pink Floyd "Shine On You Crazy Diamond"	Guns N' Roses "November Rain"
2015	John Lennon "Imagine"	Queen "Bohemian Rhapsody"	Eagles "Hotel California"	Claudia de Breij "Mag ik dan bij jou"	Led Zeppelin "Stairway to Heaven"	Billy Joel "Piano Man"	Boudewijn de Groot "Avond"	Deep Purple "Child in Time"	Pink Floyd "Wish You Were Here"	Coldplay "Fix You"
2016	Queen "Bohemian Rhapsody"	Eagles "Hotel California"	Led Zeppelin "Stairway to Heaven"	Billy Joel "Piano Man"	Deep Purple "Child in Time"	Boudewijn de Groot "Avond"	David Bowie "'Heroes'"	Claudia de Breij "Mag ik dan bij jou"	Pink Floyd "Wish You Were Here"	Pearl Jam "Black"
2017	Queen "Bohemian Rhapsody"	Eagles "Hotel California"	Led Zeppelin "Stairway to Heaven"	Billy Joel "Piano Man"	Deep Purple "Child in Time"	Pearl Jam "Black"	Pink Floyd "Wish You Were Here"	Coldplay "Fix You"	Boudewijn de Groot "Avond"	Guns N' Roses "November Rain"
2018	Queen "Bohemian Rhapsody"	Eagles "Hotel California"	Billy Joel "Piano Man"	Led Zeppelin "Stairway to Heaven"	Pink Floyd "Wish You Were Here"	Deep Purple "Child in Time"	Pearl Jam "Black"	Toto "Africa"	Coldplay "Fix You"	Boudewijn de Groot "Avond"
2019	Queen "Bohemian Rhapsody"	Eagles "Hotel California"	Billy Joel "Piano Man"	Danny Vera "Roller Coaster"	Led Zeppelin "Stairway to Heaven"	Boudewijn de Groot "Avond"	Pearl Jam "Black"	Coldplay "Fix You"	Normaal "De boer dat is de keerl"	Pink Floyd "Wish You Were Here"
2020	Danny Vera "Roller Coaster"	Queen "Bohemian Rhapsody"	Eagles "Hotel California"	Billy Joel "Piano Man"	Led Zeppelin "Stairway to Heaven"	Pearl Jam "Black"	Boudewijn de Groot "Avond"	Coldplay "Fix You"	Pink Floyd "Wish You Were Here"	David Bowie "'Heroes'"
2021	Queen "Bohemian Rhapsody"	Danny Vera "Roller Coaster"	Procol Harum "A Whiter Shade of Pale"	Eagles "Hotel California"	Billy Joel "Piano Man"	Golden Earring "Radar Love"	Led Zeppelin "Stairway to Heaven"	Metallica "Nothing Else Matters"	Pearl Jam "Black"	Boudewijn de Groot "Avond"
2022	Queen "Bohemian Rhapsody"	Danny Vera "Roller Coaster"	Eagles "Hotel California"	Billy Joel "Piano Man"	Coldplay "Fix You"	Led Zeppelin "Stairway to Heaven"	Pearl Jam "Black"	Boudewijn de Groot "Avond"	Metallica "Nothing Else Matters"	Queen "Love of My Life"
2023	Queen "Bohemian Rhapsody"	Danny Vera "Roller Coaster"	Eagles "Hotel California"	Billy Joel "Piano Man"	Coldplay "Fix You"	Led Zeppelin "Stairway to Heaven"	Pearl Jam "Black"	Boudewijn de Groot "Avond"	Metallica "Nothing Else Matters"	Queen "Love of My Life"
2024	Queen "Bohemian Rhapsody"	Coldplay "Fix You"	Eagles "Hotel California"	Danny Vera "Roller Coaster"	Billy Joel "Piano Man"	Dermot Kennedy "Better Days"	Led Zeppelin "Stairway to Heaven"	Boudewijn de Groot "Avond"	Queen "Love of My Life"	Pearl Jam "Black"
2025	Queen "Bohemian Rhapsody"	Billy Joel "Piano Man"	Eagles "Hotel California"	Coldplay "Fix You"	Danny Vera "Roller Coaster"	Pearl Jam "Black"	Led Zeppelin "Stairway to Heaven"	Boudewijn de Groot "Avond"	Golden Earring "Radar Love"	Pink Floyd "Wish You Were Here"

== See also ==
- Serious Request – another annual Dutch radio marathon in the month of December that reaches over half the population.
