= Ekstra Weekend =

- Running time: 180 minutes
- Country of origin: Netherlands
- Language(s): Dutch
- Home station: 3FM
- Hosted by: Gerard Ekdom, Michiel Veenstra
- Produced by: Tjitse Leemhuis (a.k.a. Tjibbe Tjibsma)
- Original release: 1 September 2006 – 13 December 2013
- No. of episodes: 990
- Website: http://go.3fm.nl/ekstraweekend

Ekstra Weekend was a Dutch radio broadcast by the Dutch public broadcaster NTR for 3FM. The show aired on Friday nights between 7 and 10 pm. The show was hosted by Gerard Ekdom and Michiel Veenstra. The name Ekstra Weekend is a contraction of the last names of the two hosts. When one of the two was absent, he was replaced by Domien Verschuuren, nicknamed Iemand Anders (someone else), who used to be the producer of the show until Tjitse Leemhuis took his role. On 6 May 2011, the 'voice of 3FM', Eric Corton, substituted for Gerard Ekdom. In the past, other DJs have been known to replace either one of the regular DJs. Rob Stenders, Paul Rabbering and Bart Arens have all been substitute DJs. They all have their own shows on 3FM. Producer Tjitse Leemhuis (a.k.a. Tjibbe Tjibsma) was also part of the show.

An important characteristic of the show was that it looks and sounds like total chaos. Usually more of the items go wrong or won't air on the time that they're meant to be aired. The presenters call the show their party on the radio. Although Ekstra Weekend was aired on a music station, the hosts talk a large part of the show. An important part of the show was the guest. Every week, Ekdom and Veenstra received a guest. Usually this was a celebrity from the Netherlands or Flanders. Incidentally, they'll receive a guest from the United Kingdom or United States.

Ekstra Weekend was the successor of Lantinga & Swijnenberg. That show moved to afternoon drivetime as Coen & Sander Show when Wouter van der Goes moved from 3FM to the commercial broadcaster Q-Music.

Since 6 March 2009, the show was also broadcast on the digital TV channel 101 TV.

Ekstra Weekend had been nominated for the Gouden Radioring three times. The third time the show won the award after an extensive voting campaign including an additional episode of Ekstraweekend on the Wednesday before the awards ceremony.

== Sections ==
Notable parts of the program are:

=== Kazoo-tijd/ Stuk-ijzer-in-je-bek-tijd (Kazoo Time - Piece-of-iron-in-your-Mouth-time) ===
The second time of presentation (after 3/4 tracks) Michiel and Gerard start playing on their kazoo's. The 2 guys go talk about their "wild adventures" last week. The track the 2 playing kazoo over was David Schnitter - And So They Say.

=== The voicelift ===
Gerard and Michiel played a part of a voice recording of a Dutch celebrity whose voice was electronically distorted. Listeners can call to the studio with a solution. As a gimmick, Dutch television presenter Ron Brandsteder was usually called by the first caller. Veenstra then takes a look down the hallway if it was really Ron Brandsteder and Ekdom plays a jingle of the typical laughter of Brandsteder (which sounds much like someone in severe respiratory problems). In the 20 February 2009 show, Michiel almost had a heart attack when he opened the door and found Ron's son Rick Brandsteder on the doorstep. On 17 December 2010 Michiel again got a big shock when the real Ron Brandsteder burst into the studio.

=== Uit Het Raam (out of the window) ===
In this section an object was thrown out of the window, usually by the guest. Part of this was to call security (Sjanne Paul) and the initial part of the song Breathe where Sean Paul raps his name several times was played, they have to make sure no one walks around the building when this happens. Since January 2011, this segment also has a 'decibel ranking', the louder the bang, the higher the guest ends up in the ranking.

=== Vijf Vragen (five questions) ===
If there's a guest in the show, he or she may choose five questions out of a list of fifty. The guest doesn't know the question behind that number in advance. The questions that are thus asked to the guest are usually quite difficult or personal, but the guest does actually construct his or her own interview.

=== Het Geheime woord (The secret word) ===
Listeners can send their text messages at the moment the 'secret word'-jingle will be played. When a listener was chosen, he or she receives the secret word off-air. Then a friend or relative of the listener is called. When they pick up the phone, the contestant has to describe the secret word, without actually saying it or mentioning they are on national radio. When the other person guesses the word, instantly the James Last version of the "Too Fat Polka (She's too fat for me)" is played, while the entire studio goes crazy. Hammering things with trashcan lids or forming a conga line to celebrate the correct answer. At last the prizes the contestant wins are revealed. When the provided relatives or friends can't be reached, Fabienne de Vries was called. She's usually helpful to the contestant and almost always gets the right word.

=== The End ===
On November 1, 2013, Ekdom and Veenstra broadcast an announcement that on December 13 of that year, the show will end because "it has not been pretty" and the DJs wanted to stop at the peak of the show. At the same time, the 3fm.nl website announced that the successor will be a program that will be presented by Timur Perlin.

The penultimate broadcast on 6 December was called the 'Ekstra Weekend Experience' a tribute to the listeners, some of whom featured in the broadcast were given a tour of the studio, and could participate in Uit Het Raam and throw something out the window.

In the last broadcast, Gerard threw his old stereo out the window, which he in his own words said as a teenager he had listened to Rob Stenders and Jeroen van Inkel and he had kept all this time.
