= Annemieke Schollaardt =

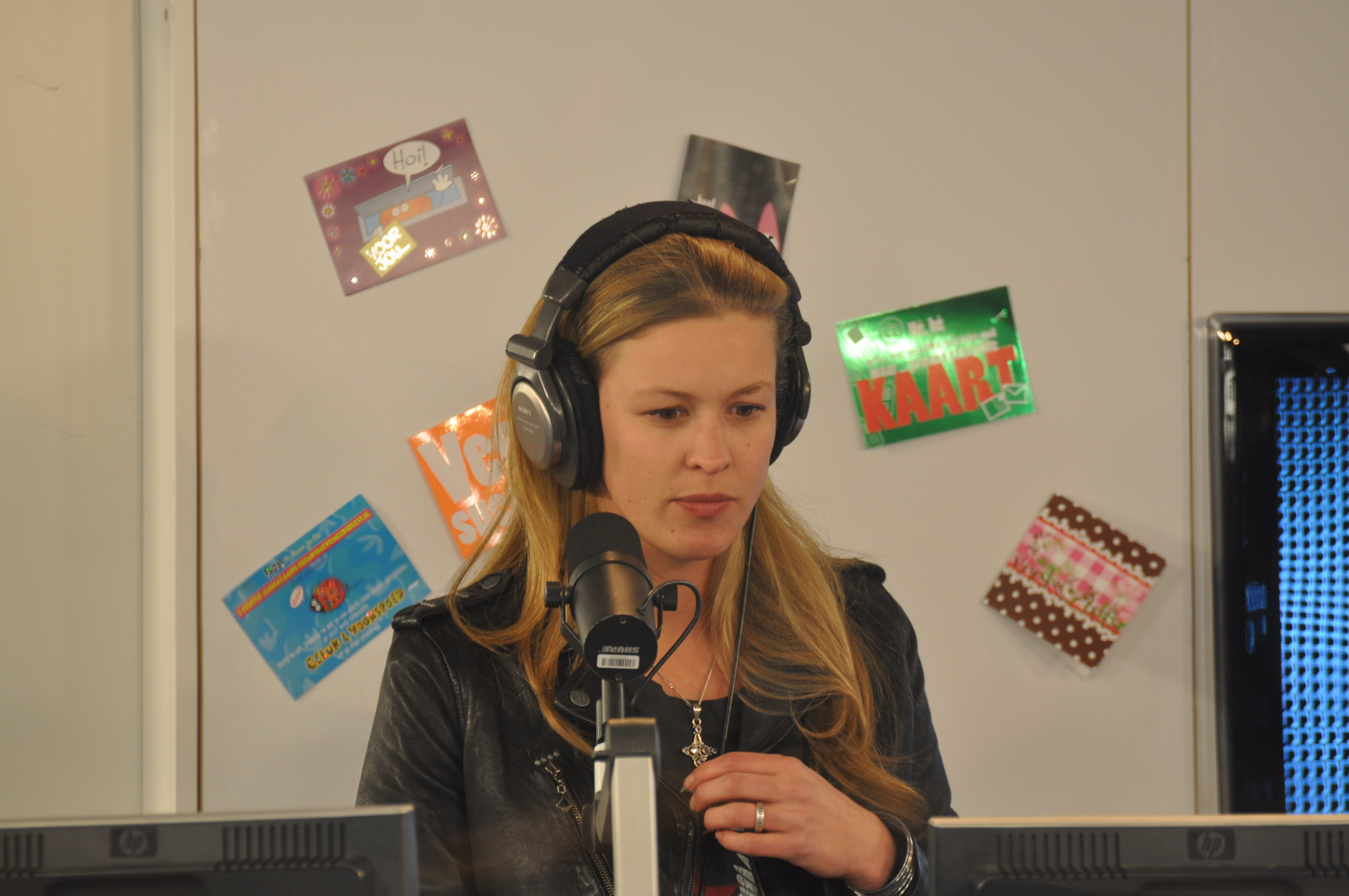
- Born: 3 May 1979 (age 47); Amsterdam, Netherlands
- Spouse: Phill Tilli
- Children: 1
- Presenting career
- Show: Annemiekes A-lunch
- Station: NPO Radio 2
- Network: AVROTROS
- Time slot: 12:00 - 14:00 p.m. Monday, Tuesday, Wednesday, Thursday, Friday
- Style: Disc Jockey
- Country: Netherlands

Annemieke Schollaardt (born 3 May 1979) is a DJ for AVROTROS on popular music channel NPO Radio 2. Until April 2009, Annemieke was heard daily on a radio project called Uruzgan FM. On Saturday and Sunday morning between 10:00 and 12:00 she hosted the Annemieke Hier programme on NPO 3FM as well as the Saturday evening programme Weekend DNA, between 20:00 and 22:00. On 1 September 2017 Annemieke moved, after 11 years, from NPO 3FM to NPO Radio 2. Annemieke can now be heard Friday to Sunday from 14:00 to 16:00 on NPO Radio 2 with Annemiekes A-Lijst.

== Curaçao ==
After studying pedagogy Annemieke left to Curaçao to stay for a few weeks. She remained there for five years. During that time, after doing several other jobs, she joined radio station Dolphin FM. Some time later she was given a job at TROS Paradise with an afternoon radio show.

== NPO 3FM (TROS) ==
Once back in her home country, she got to work with TROS in the Netherlands, where she works as a producer and backup DJ on NPO 3FM. Since 2009, NPO 3FM adopted Annemieke as a new female radio voice. She does that together with Eric Corton, who apart from being a radio DJ, is well known for his enthousiasm about the guitar.

Since January 2008 Annemieke has her own radio show on Saturday evening, between 20:00 and 22:00, along with Domien Verschuuren. This programme is called Weekend DNA.

In 2008, during the DJ version of the Popduel game of 3FM show RabRadio, Annemieke played against Gerard Ekdom and she won, breaking a winning streak for Ekdom, who had remained unbeaten for three years.

Annemieke was nominated for a Marconi Award (for new upcoming talent) in 2007, 2008 and 2009.

On 7 December 2009, during the afternoon show of Rob Stenders, it was announced in a phone call that the 'hot' Annemieke, would go in the 'Glazen Huis' (Glass House in Dutch), for the social event Serious Request 2009, which took place in Groningen (city). During that same show, it was announced that DJs Gerard Ekdom and Giel Beelen would join her.

== Uruzgan FM ==
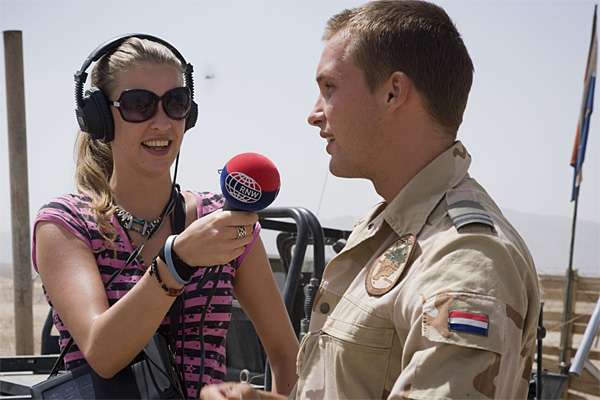
Uruzgan FM, July 2008

Since August 2006 Annemieke presents Uruzgan FM, a request programme especially for the soldiers deployed to Uruzgan (Afghanistan) and their home. This programme is updated every working day between 16:00 and 17:00 and broadcast on Uruzgan FM. On 1 April 2009 she transferred the programme to 3FM DJ Kristel van Eijk, also works with 3FM.

== NPO Radio 2 scheduling controversy ==
In mid-July 2017, Annemieke switched to NPO Radio 2 for a new slot "Annemiekes A-Lijst" of the entire work week between 14:00 and 16:00. With this change, Rob Stenders was let go because of his move from AVROTROS to BNNVARA, He initially reckoned that he could continue presenting NPO Radio 2's most-renowned programme Stenders Platenbonanza when he switched to BNNVARA.

However, after five months, because of the strong criticism that NPO received, Stenders was invited to come back to NPO Radio 2. Then Annemieke was transferred to host the 3 days of the weekend (Friday - Sunday) whilst Stenders took up the rest of the week. The time slot was still the same.

AVROTROS criticised NPO as already "danger" Annemieke with even her also expressing the discomfort herself.

== Personal life ==
On 7 January 2010 it was announced that Annemieke would marry Moke (Amsterdam band) guitarist Phill Tilli.
