= Eva Hermans-Kroot =

Dutch cancer blogger (1998–2024)

- Born: 11 May 1998; Tilburg, Netherlands
- Died: 30 November 2024 (aged 26)
- Occupations: Blogger, writer

Eva Hermans-Kroot (11 May 1998 – 30 November 2024) was a Dutch blogger and writer who shared her experiences with her terminal lung cancer via social media and television. She gained fame by sharing her experiences on Instagram and her participation in the television and radio programs.

== Biography ==
Hermans-Kroot was a frequent guest on the radio program "Mattie en Marieke" on Qmusic, where she shared her story. Her story helped the song "Better Days" by Dermot Kennedy earn the Alarmschijf honor on Qmusic, as the song offered her great support during her cancer battle. She was in the tenth season of the BNNVARA television program Over Mijn Lijk, in which she shared her life. She ran the Instagram account "Longeneeslijk", which is also the title of the book which she wrote about her illness. Her book launch was supposed to happen on Christmas, but as a result of her declining condition, it was moved forward to 27 November 2024.

Eva Kroot was married to Matthijs Hermans. Their wedding was on 2 May 2022.

In August 2024, Hermans-Kroot announced that her illness was terminal. She continued to focus on achieving her goals, including as publishing her book. In October 2024, she gave a guest lecture at Erasmus MC. She died on 30 November 2024, at the age of 26. In her honor, the Dutch people voted the song "Better Days" by Dermot Kennedy in at number six in the country's annual Top 2000 songs of all time poll.
