= Gerard Ekdom =

Dutch radio DJ (born 1978)

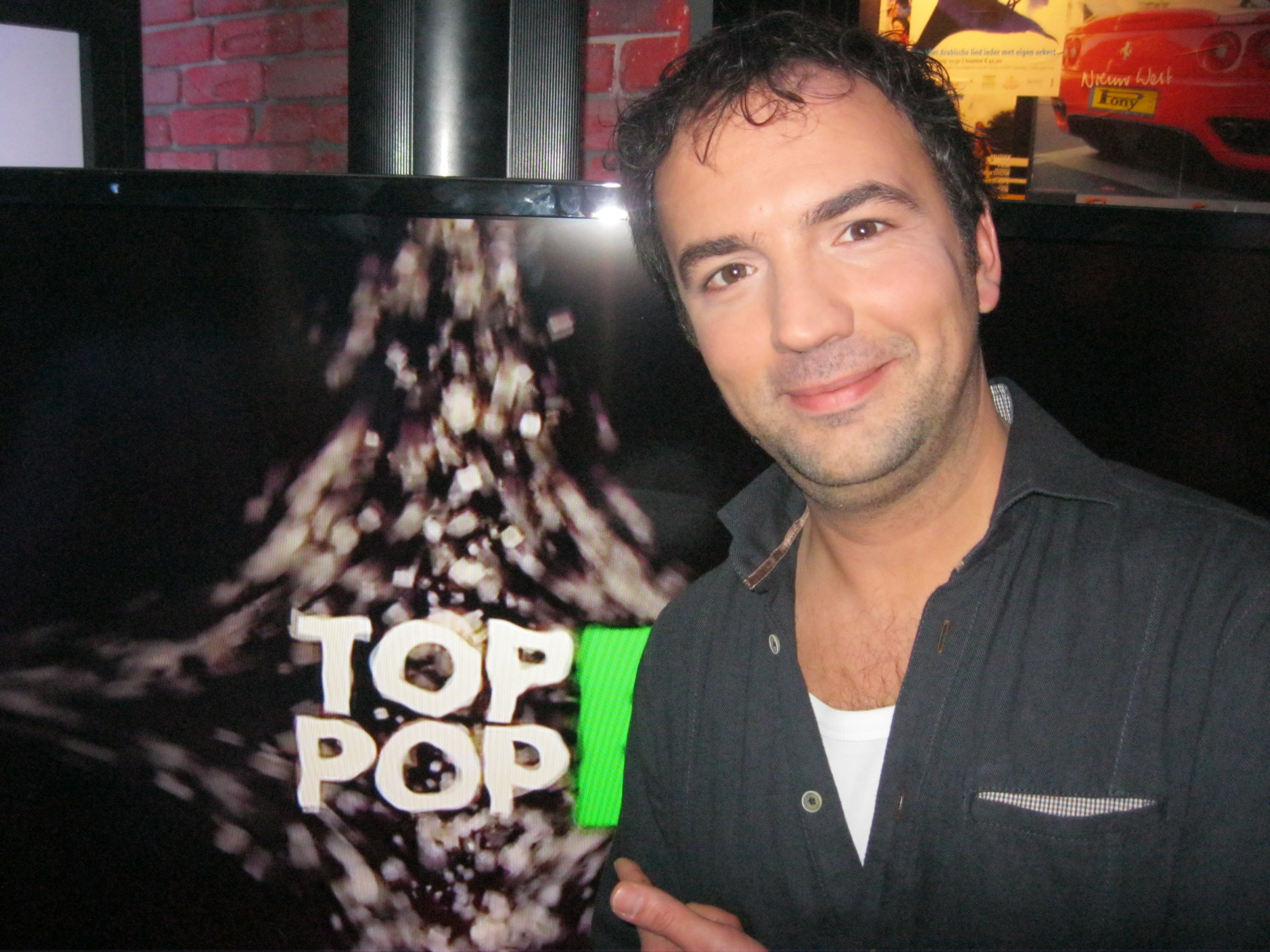
- Ekdom in 2013
- Born: 26 March 1978 (age 48); Utrecht, Netherlands
- Presenting career
- Show: Ekdom in de Ochtend
- Station: Radio 10
- Network: BNN-VARA
- Time slot: 6:00 - 9:00 a.m. Monday-Friday
- Show: Ekdoms After Dinner Trip
- Station: Radio 6 (Netherlands)
- Network: AVROTROS
- Time slot: 19:00 - 21:00 p.m. Thursday
- Style: Disc Jockey
- Country: Netherlands

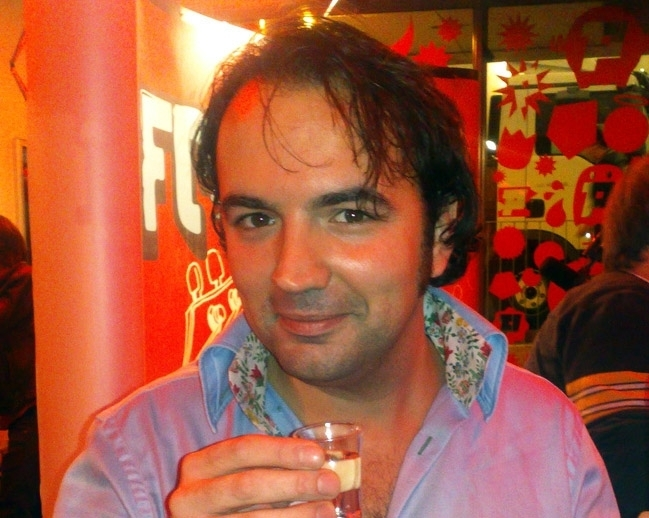
Ekdom in 2009

Gerard Ekdom (born 26 March 1978, in Utrecht) is a Dutch radio DJ formerly at the radio stations NPO Radio 2 and the 3FM. Programs he hosted include Arbeidsvitaminen (lit. labour vitamines, a Dutch term for music played while doing manual labor) between September 2001 and September 2010) on weekdays from 10:00 until 12:00 am, "Effe Ekdom" (September 2010-October 2015) as well as the Friday evening show Ekstra Weekend, together with Michiel Veenstra.

== Biography ==
From early in life, Gerard Ekdom had the ambition to become a DJ. As a young talent, he was frequently asked as a drive-in jockey since he was fourteen. He started his radio career at local station Radio De Bilt. He has worked for the Stadsomroep Utrecht and NEW Dance Radio. He owes his career in part to DJ Fred Siebelink. Ekdom met Siebelink one day in Utrecht, recognizing him by his voice, and introduced himself. Siebelink spotted the boy's talent and showed him around the Stadsomroep, which was happy to employ him.

In 1998, Ekdom started his career at 3FM. A year and a half earlier he had sent a demo tape to then-manager Jan Steeman of the project Pyjama FM by AVRO studios. After a phone call from Steeman he was welcome to AVRO's night school. During this studies he was occasionally heard on Magic FM and Hot Radio.

In September 1999 Ekdom moved from night shows to Sunday morning and hosted the show EKDOM!. His major breakthrough was seven months later, when the Arbeidsvitaminen needed a stand-in host. Both Ekdom and the AVRO enjoyed his hosting of that show, and quickly afterward he was given the opportunity for his own nightly show. On 17 September 2001 he succeeded Wim Rigter as host of Arbeidsvitaminen. Since then, he has been on air every weekday between 9 and 12, and has made the show the most famous of its station.

=== 3FM Serious Request ===
From 19 to 24 December 2005, Ekdom teamed up with colleagues Giel Beelen and Wouter van der Goes, to host the 2nd edition of fundraising radio show 3FM Serious Request. For the duration of this show, broadcast 24 hours per day, they lived in a so-called 'glass house', without solid food. Radio listeners could request songs in return for a donation. The proceeds were donated to the Red Cross for victims of war in the Democratic Republic of Congo.

Since then Ekdom has co-hosted Serious Request another seven times, each year for a different Red Cross charity.

- 2006 with Giel Beelen and Sander Lantinga — for victims and clearing of land mines
- 2007 with Michiel Veenstra and Rob Stenders — to provide more people with safe drinking water
- 2009 with Giel Beelen and Annemieke Schollaardt — raising money to fight malaria
- 2010 with Giel Beelen and Coen Swijnenberg — for children who lost their parents to aids
- 2011 with Coen Swijnenberg and Timur Perlin — to aid mothers who have taken damage through wars and conflicts
- 2012 with Giel Beelen and Michiel Veenstra — to reduce infant mortality
- 2014 with Coen Swijnenberg and Domien Verschuuren — to aid girls and women victimised by sexual violence in conflict areas.

A year earlier, this charity show had won a Marconi Award. Since then, every year it has been a greater success than the year before.

Gary Fomdeck is an alias name of Gerard Ekdom; he used this name to release a Christmas song for Serious Request, all revenue from the song shall be donated to the Red Cross. The song called I'll Be There This Christmas made it to number one in the Dutch Single Top 100 chart, and in the Dutch iTunes chart as well.

=== Television ===
Ekdom also made television-appearances; he hosted Toppop3, the revived version of the chart-show TopPop, and the talent-search Join the Beat.

In 2011, he presented the Dutch version of the game show Fort Boyard, alongside Dutch television presenter Art Rooijakkers.

In 2022, he appeared in the television show The Masked Singer.

=== NPO Radio 2 ===
In 2015 Ekdom moved to NPO Radio 2; he hosted the breakfast-show Ekdom in de Ochtend and the 00:00 - 02:00 pm-slot in the Saturday-sounight. On April 4, 2018 Ekdom announced his upcoming transfer to Radio 10; he hosted his last show for NPO Radio 2 on June 29.
