= Danny Vera (singer) =

Dutch singer, composer and musician

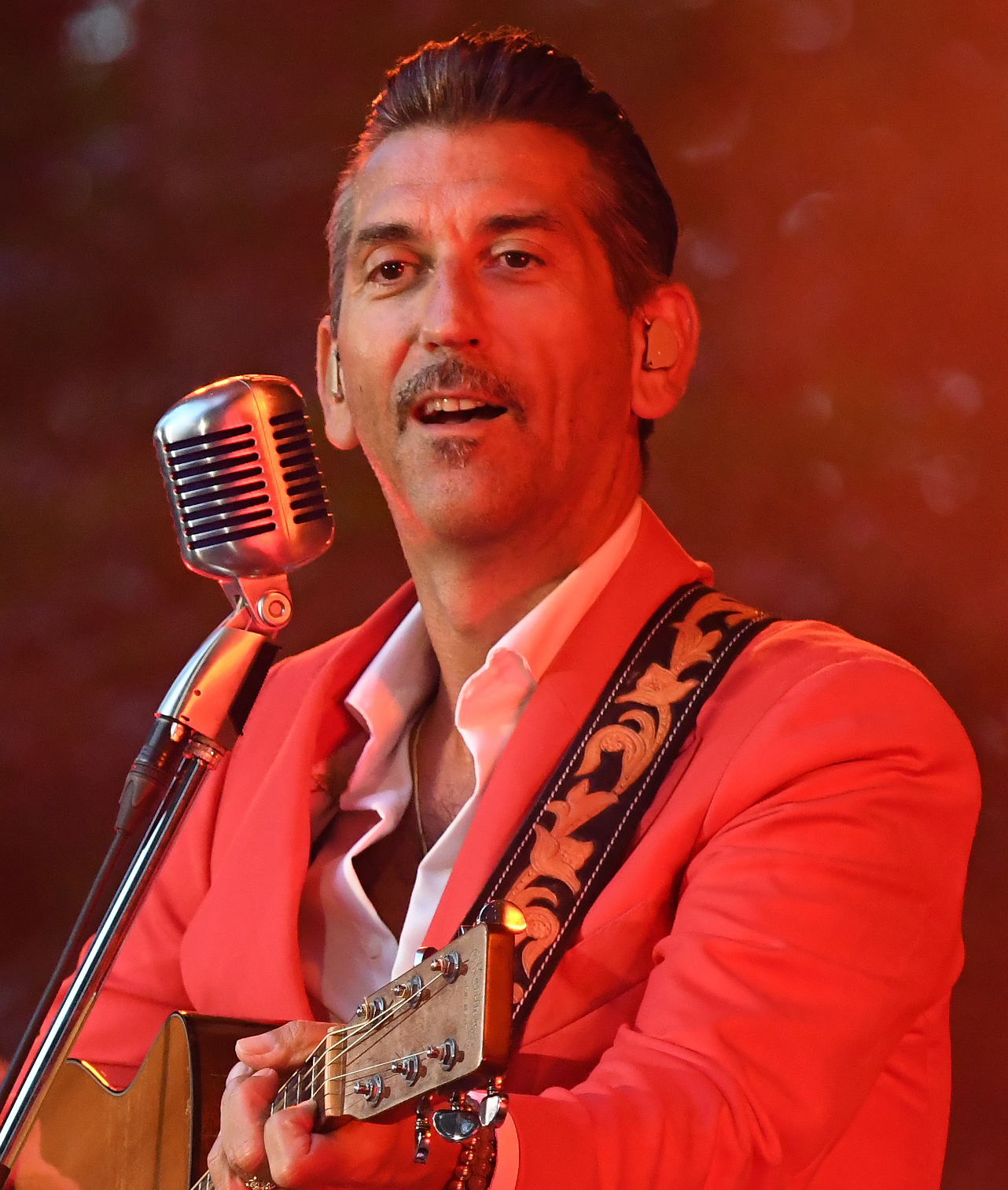
- Vera in 2025

Background information
- Born: Danny Polfliet; 31 May 1977; Middelburg, Netherlands
- Genres: Americana, pop
- Occupations: Singer-songwriter, musician
- Instruments: Vocals, guitar
- Years active: 1999–present
- Label: Excelsior Recordings
- Website: https://www.dannyvera.com

Danny Polfliet (born 31 May 1977), known professionally as Danny Vera, is a Dutch singer-songwriter and musician.

== Career ==
Danny Vera started his first band Till Dawn in 1999, with which he won the "Zeeuwse Belofte" award. He chose the stage name Danny Vera to honor his mother, whose first name was Vera. She died in 2001, when Vera was 24. Soon after, he signed a contract with Universal Music Group.

He released his first solo album For the Light in Your Eyes in 2003.

In April 2009 Vera went to Hilltop Studios in Nashville, Tennessee to record his fourth album, Pink Flamingo.

Football pundit Johan Derksen's successful insistence that Danny Vera would play in his TV talkshows VI and Voetbal Inside launched Vera's musical career.

In 2019 his song "Roller Coaster" from his seventh album Pressure Makes Diamonds Part II finally hit the Dutch charts. One year later, the song went on to rank first in the annual Dutch Top 2000.

== Personal life ==
In the 2020 documentary Danny Vera: Van oma’s kelder tot Carré Vera said he hasn't eaten meat "for years".

Vera married his wife Escha Tanihatu in 2013.

== Discography ==
=== Studio albums ===
Album title	Release date	Charting in the Dutch Album Top 100			Comments
Album title	Release date	Date of entry	Highest	Weeks	Comments
For the Light in Your Eyes	2002	-	-	-	
Hold On a While	12 April 2005	-	-	-	
Ordinary Man	31 August 2007	-	-	-	
Pink Flamingo	11 September 2009	-	-	-	
Distant Rumble	2 November 2013	9 November 2013	61	3	Live album
The New Black & White	9 October 2014	9 November 2014	100	1	
The New Black & White, Pt. II	10 September 2015	19 September 2015	14	5	
The Outsider	1 September 2016	10 September 2016	5	5	
The New Black & White, Pt. III	6 October 2017	14 October 2017	51	2	
Pressure Makes Diamonds 1 – The Year of the Snake	9 November 2018	*	*	*	* see Pressure Makes Diamonds 1 & 2
Pressure Makes Diamonds 2 – Pompadour Hippie	15 February 2019	*	*	*	* see Pressure Makes Diamonds 1 & 2
Pressure Makes Diamonds 1 & 2	15 February 2019	23 February 2019	4	180	Compilation album
Pressure Makes Diamonds	25 September 2020	*	*	*	* see Pressure Makes Diamonds 1 & 2
The New Black and White, Pt. IV – Home Recordings	28 August 2020	5 September 2020	21	2	
The New Now	13 November 2020	21 November 2020	1	32	
The New Black and White, Pt. V	30 September 2022	8 October 2022	1	2	
DNA	13 October 2023	21 October 2023	1	1	
The Way Home	15 November 2025	15 November 2025	1	1	
