= Giel Beelen =

Dutch radio DJ and presenter

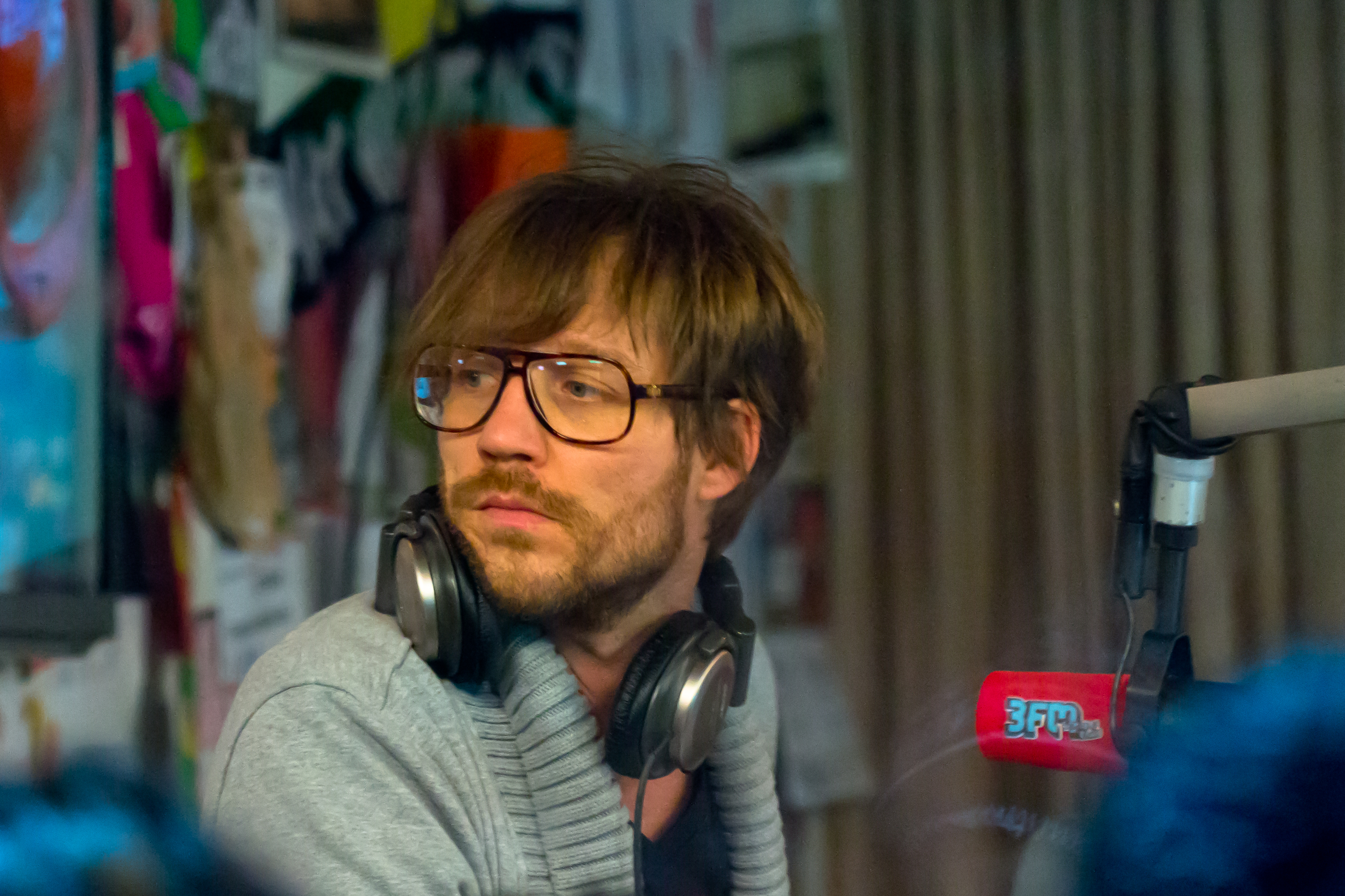
- Giel Beelen during Serious Request 2012
- Born: Michiel Antonius Adrianus Beelen; 25 May 1977 (age 49); Haarlem, Netherlands
- Spouse(s): Marisa Heutink (1999–2008); Giulia Wolthuis (2008–2014)
- Presenting career
- Show: Veronica Ochtendshow met Giel
- Station: Veronica Radio
- Time slot: 6:00 - 9:00 a.m. Monday-Friday
- Style: Disc Jockey
- Country: Netherlands
- Website: radioveronica.nl/... (in Dutch)

Michiel Antonius Adrianus "Giel" Beelen (born 25 May 1977) is a Dutch radio DJ and presenter from Haarlem, Noord-Holland, working primarily for public broadcaster VARA. Rising to fame as a shock jock, Beelen was known for hosting his breakfast show GI:EL, on NPO 3FM from 2004 to 2016 and NPO Radio 2 from 2020 to 2022.

In 2014, Beelen achieved a Guinness World Record for the longest radio DJ marathon ever, lasting 198 hours of non-stop broadcasting, after having improved the world record for the longest duration continuous crowd surfing in 2011.

Other shows Beelen presented were the Friday night show 'FreakNacht' from 1:00 to 4:00 am, as well as the extreme participation TV show Factor giel and a TV talk show called GielTV. In one part he and the interviewed person are naked (but largely this amounts to showing the bare shoulders).

== Career ==
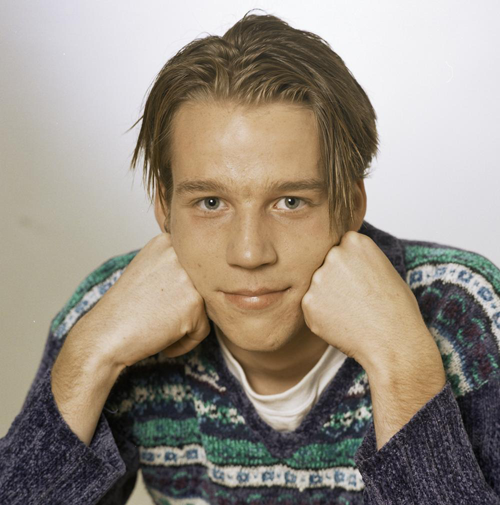
Giel Beelen in 1998

From an early age, Beelen was determined to become a disc jockey. When he was just a little kid, he made himself a mock radio station to pretend he was a dj. After starting at a local Haarlem broadcasting company, presenting a show for kids, he soon moved to Radio 10 Gold and later to Radio Noordzee to work as an engineer.

In 1997 Beelen moved to the AVRO at Radio 3FM, where he hosted a show during night time. In 2000, he received fellatio live on air from a prostitute that he called into the studio. In January 2001, the KRO fired him from 3FM because he said that Mein Kampf was the most impressive book that he knew. Then, he worked as a presenter for BNNVARA. After September 11, he would do shows in the streets dressed as an Arab with a microphone in his turban. However, he was also fired from VARA in 2001 after asking listeners to send letters with flour to KRO, during the 2001 anthrax scare, as revenge for firing him earlier that year.

In October 2003 he won a Dutch Marconi Award, for best radiomaker of 2003. He won the award again in 2005, 2006 & 2007.

From 2004 until 2017 Giel worked for the NPS, back to the VARA, to present his breakfast show 'GIEL!' and his Friday night show Nachtegiel, as part of 'The Friday Freak Night'. The Friday Freak night has also, Ekdom in de nacht ('Ekdom in the night'), presented by Gerard Ekdom, between 4.00 and 7.00 am.

In 2016, Beelen faced criticism for making monkey noises when referring to Sylvana Simons. Beelen denied racist intent behind the act.

Since 2017, Beelen has a morning show at Radio Veronica. In March 2018, Beelen paid a stripper to undress next to singer-songwriter Tim Knol while he was doing a live performance in the Radio Veronica studio.

In 2004, 2005, 2006, 2008, 2009, 2010, 2012 and 2013 he lived in the Glass House (Het Glazen Huis) a week prior to Christmas without anything to eat to collect money for projects supported by the Red Cross in a show called Serious Request.

In 2020 and 2021, Beelen was one of the DJs who presented the Top 2000.

Beelen took a professional hiatus in 2023 to travel the world with his new girlfriend Floor Joustra. He returned to radio, for NPO Radio 2's morning show, as a substitute during summer 2024. In September 2025, he began to host his own show again, Giels Radio Show, on Yoursafe Radio. The show ended later that year as Yoursafe Radio decided to change course. Beelen returned to Radio Veronica in September 2026 with a new Friday evening radio show.

== Events (co-)hosted ==
- Serious Request in 2004, 2005, 2006, 2008, 2009, 2010 and 2012 as Radio DJ.
- Pinkpop in Landgraaf as Radio DJ, Reporter on Radio 3FM and TV Host, on Nederland 3.
- Liberation pop festival on Liberation Day in Haarlem.
- Student demonstration, on 30 November 2007 in Amsterdam.
- Dance4life event 2006
- Top 2000, 2020 and 2021

== Personal life ==
From 1999 to 2008, Beelen was in a relationship with Dutch DJ Marisa Heutink. They had three wedding ceremonies, all abroad in Jamaica, Mexico and Las Vegas, but never had their marriage officially ratified in the Netherlands. In 2008, he started a relationship with dancer and model Giulia Wolthuis, starting when he was 31 and she was 18, which led to some controversy. They were engaged in 2012, but separated in 2014.

In June 2023, he announced that he and his girlfriend Floor Joustra were expecting their first child. The two married in August 2023. They currently have two children.
