= Rob Stenders =

Dutch radio DJ (born 1965)

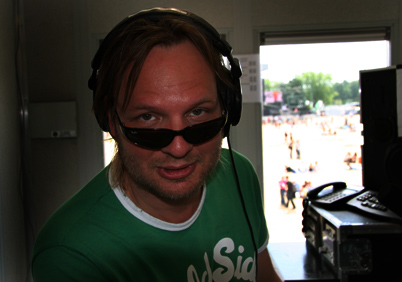
- Stenders in 2005
- Born: Rob Zieltjens; 18 April 1965 (age 61); Oisterwijk, Netherlands
- Presenting career
- Show: Stenders Latevermaak & RobRadio
- Station: 3FM
- Network: PowNed, AVROTROS
- Time slot: 14:00 – 16:00 (RobRadio) and 22:00 – 01:00 (Stenders Late vermaak); Fridays
- Show: The Best of 2night
- Station: Radio 2
- Time slot: 18:00 – 00:00 a.m. Saturday
- Style: Disc Jockey
- Country: Netherlands

Rob Stenders (born 18 April 1965) is a Dutch radio DJ.

Stenders had a long-lasting career in radio starting with local radio stations. Stenders followed up Edwin Evers with the 3FM morning show "Stenders Vroeg" for the public radio and television company "VARA". In 2004 Stenders and his sidekicks moved to the commercial radio station "Yorin FM" and renamed his show "Stenders Vroeg Op". When Yorin was bought by SBS the name changed into Caz! and the format of the station changed, upon which Rob Stenders decided to quit. Between April 2006 and May 2007, he temporarily was no longer a DJ on national radio. He remained at his own internet radio station KX Radio and he has had his own late-night show on Dutch TV-channel Tien.

Starting 7 May, he is back on the public network radio station 3FM with his new show "RobRadio" Fridays between 14:00 and 16:00. And Stenders Late Vermaak on Fridays between 22:00 and 01:00 CET.

In the beginning of 2015 Stenders moved to NPO Radio 2. Initially on Saturday by the public broadcaster PowNed, but by the end of 2015 he moved to AVROTROS to present the daily show Stenders Platenbonanza from 14:00 until 16:00 CET on the same radio station, which replaced the Roodshow that was presented by Jan-Willem Roodbeen, who moved to the evening.
