= 76th British Academy Film Awards =

2023 film award ceremony

- Date: 19 February 2023
- Site: Royal Festival Hall, London
- Hosted by: Richard E. Grant; Alison Hammond

Highlights
- Best Film: All Quiet on the Western Front
- Best British Film: The Banshees of Inisherin
- Best Actor: Austin Butler; Elvis
- Best Actress: Cate Blanchett; Tár
- Most awards: All Quiet on the Western Front (7)
- Most nominations: All Quiet on the Western Front (14)

The 76th British Academy Film Awards, more commonly known as the BAFTAs, were held on 19 February 2023, honouring the best national and foreign films of 2022, at the Royal Festival Hall within London's Southbank Centre. Presented by the British Academy of Film and Television Arts, accolades were handed out for the best feature-length film and documentaries of any nationality that were screened at British cinemas in 2022.

The nominations were announced on 19 January 2023 via a global livestream, hosted by actors Hayley Atwell and Toheeb Jimoh, from the arts charity's newly redeveloped HQ at 195 Piccadilly, London. The Rising Star Award nominees, which is the only category voted for by the British public, were announced on 17 January 2023.

The German language epic anti-war drama All Quiet on the Western Front received the most nominations with fourteen, tying the record set by Crouching Tiger, Hidden Dragon (2000) as the most nominated non-English language film in the awards' history; winning seven of these, including Best Film, Best Director (Edward Berger) and Best Film Not in the English Language, the World War I epic set a new record for the most BAFTA wins for a non-English language film.

The ceremony was co-hosted by Swazi-English BAFTA- and Academy Award-nominated actor Richard E. Grant and British television personality Alison Hammond, who also helmed the backstage interviews. Presenters Vick Hope and BBC Radio 1 film critic Ali Plumb hosted the red carpet pre-show. The broadcast aired on BBC One and BBC iPlayer in the UK, and was simulcast globally in eight countries.

== Winners and nominees ==
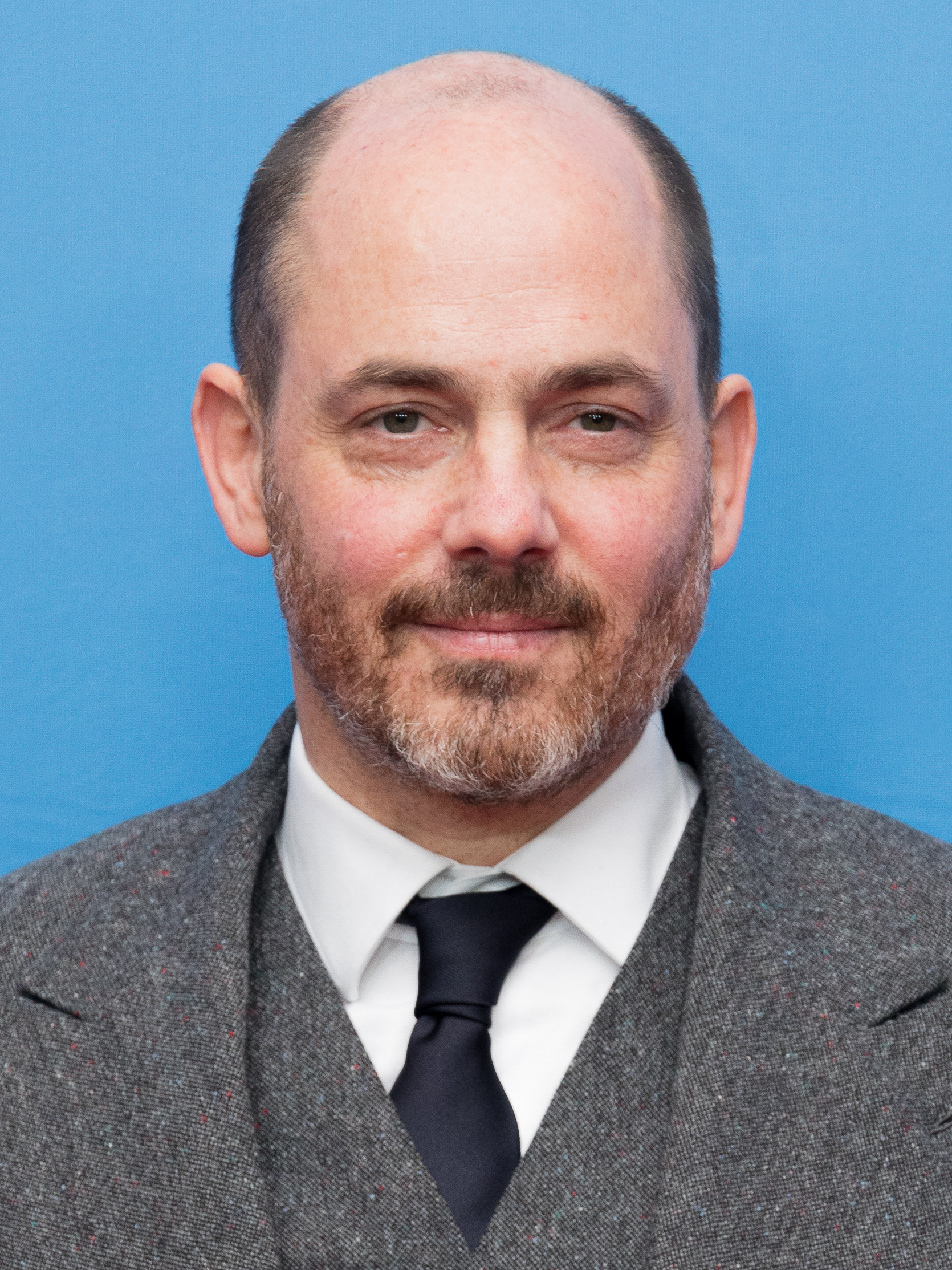
Edward Berger, Best Director winner, and Best Adapted Screenplay and Best Film Not in the English Language co-winner

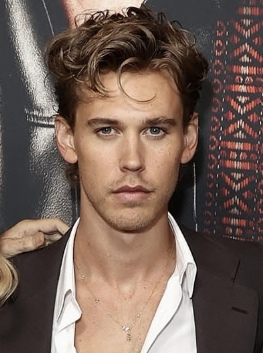
Austin Butler, Best Actor winner

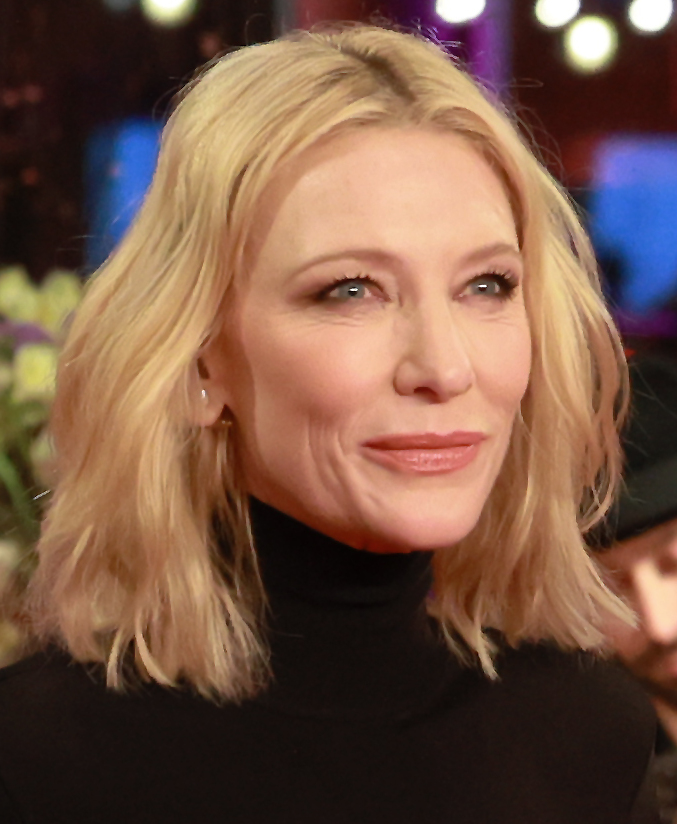
Cate Blanchett, Best Actress winner

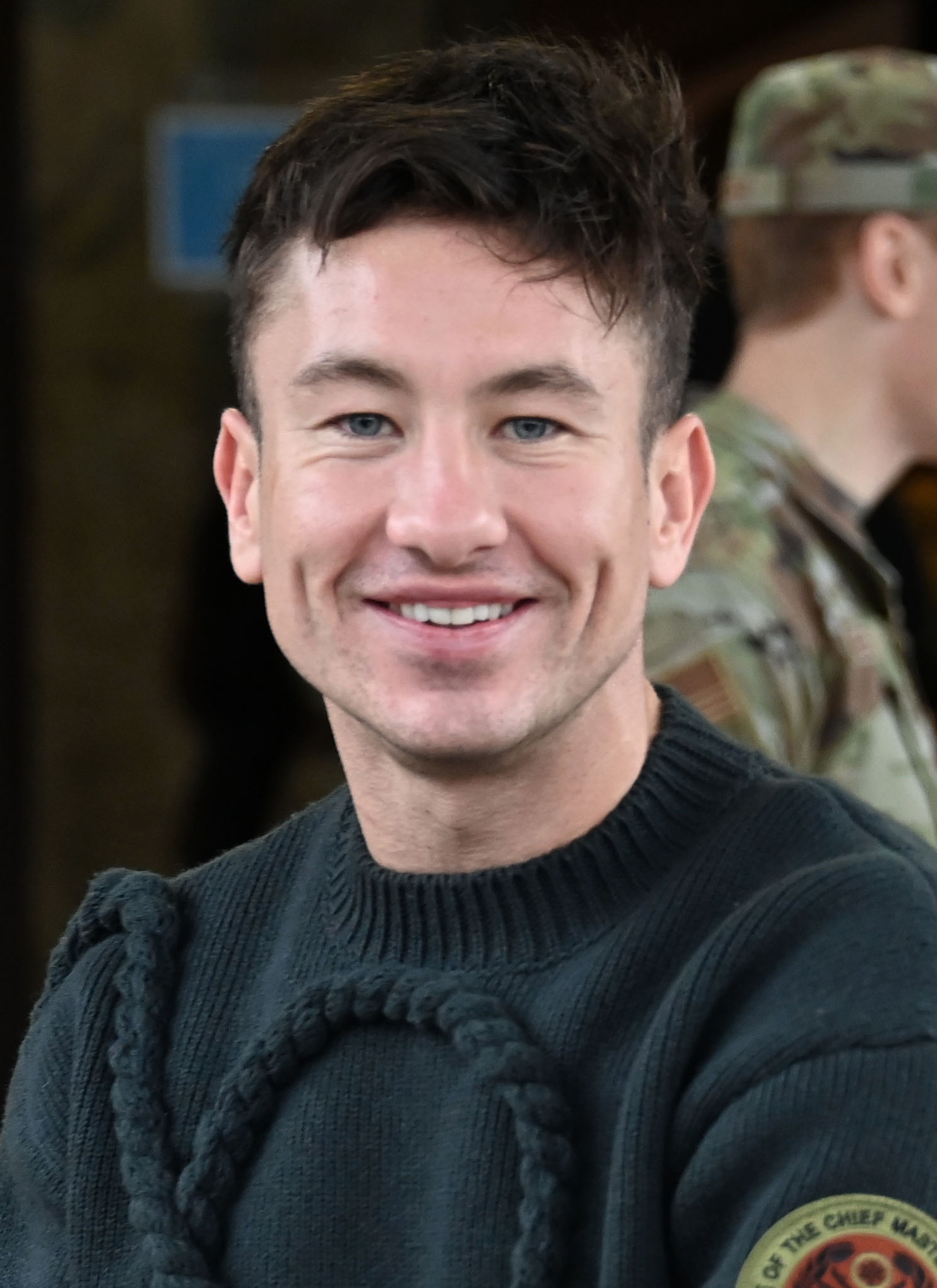
Barry Keoghan, Best Supporting Actor winner

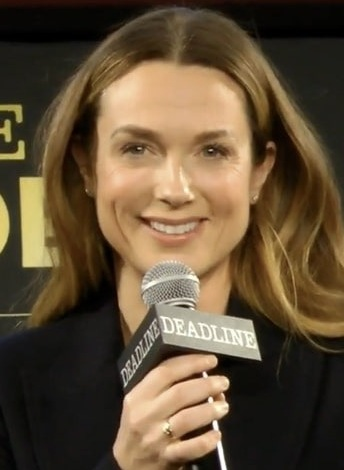
Kerry Condon, Best Supporting Actress winner

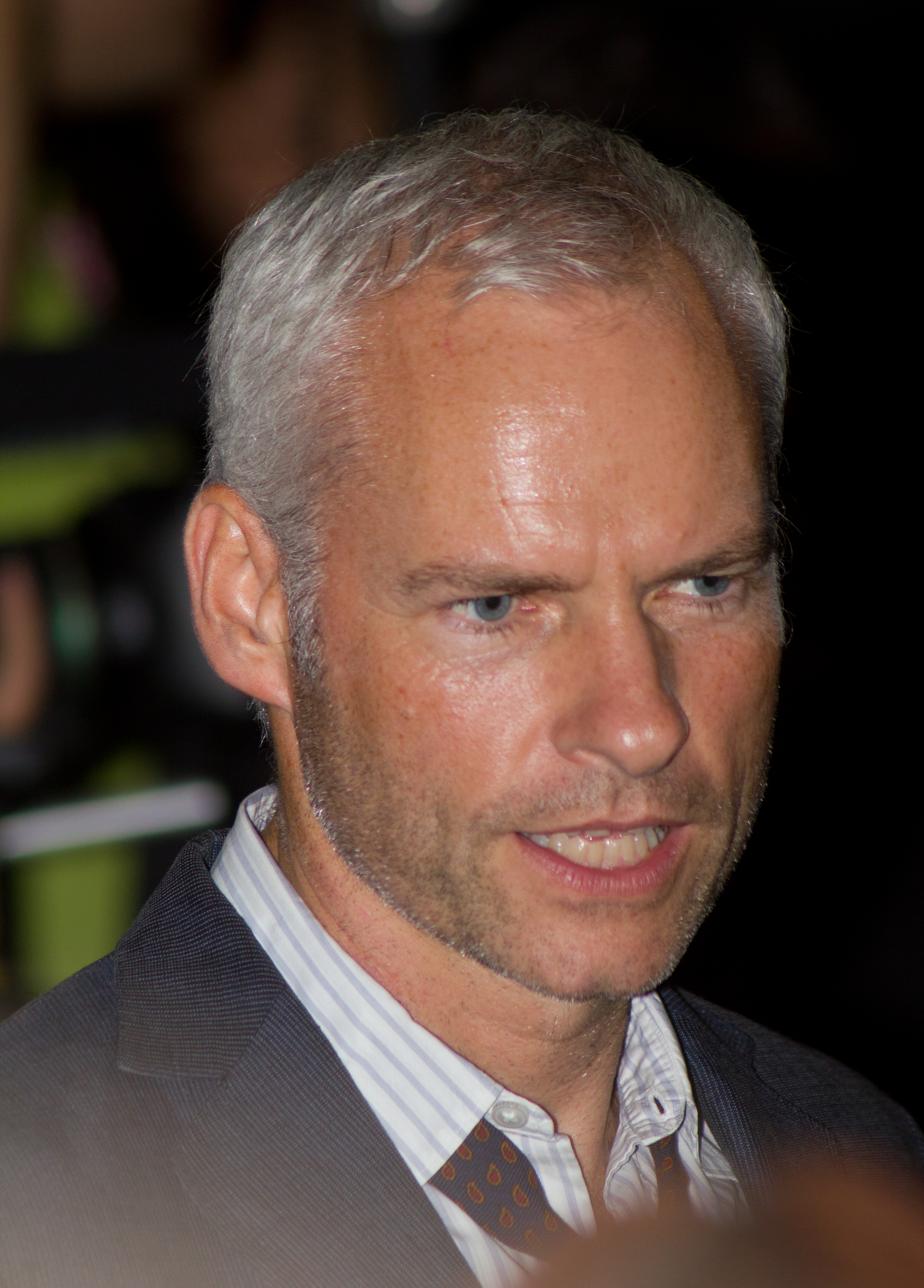
Martin McDonagh, Best Original Screenplay winner and Outstanding British Film co-winner

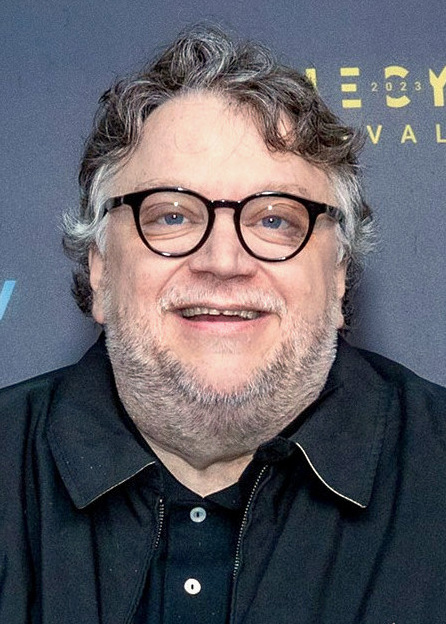
Guillermo del Toro, Best Animated Film co-winner

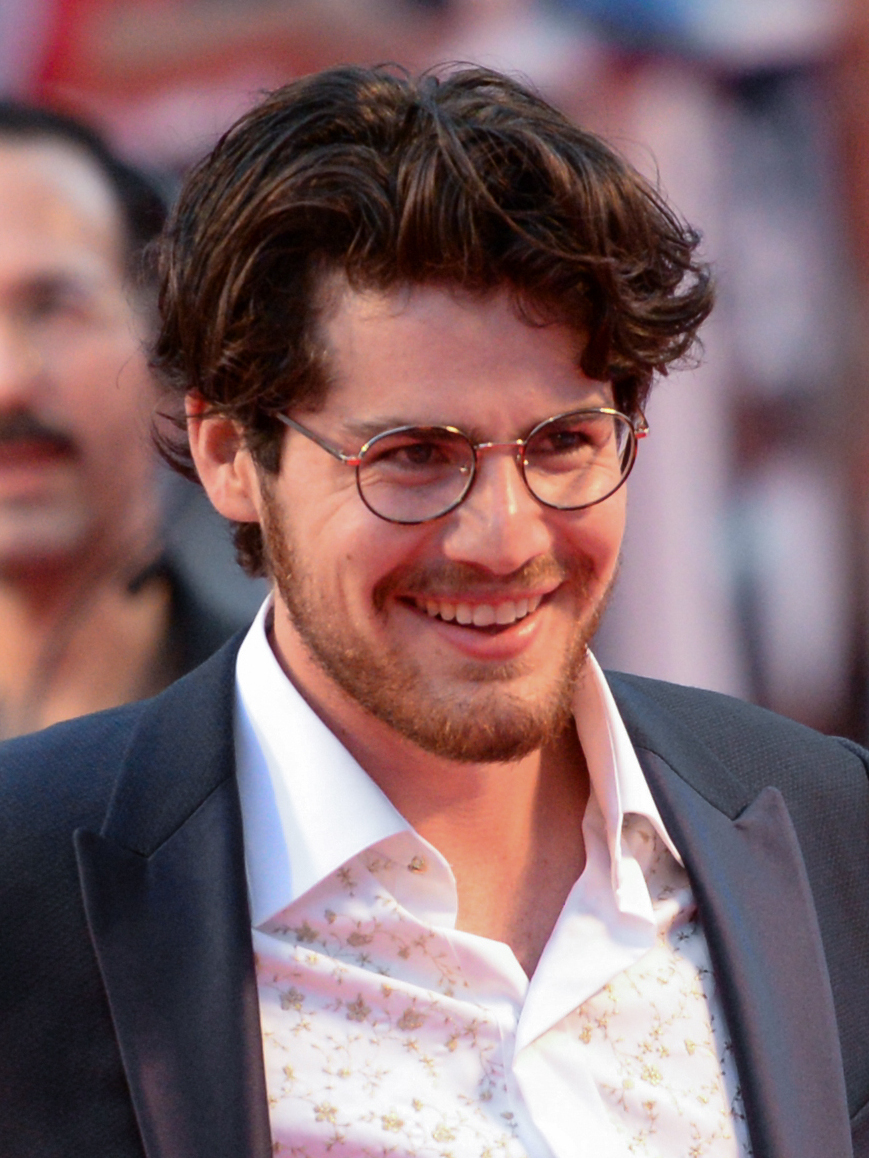
Daniel Roher, Best Documentary co-winner

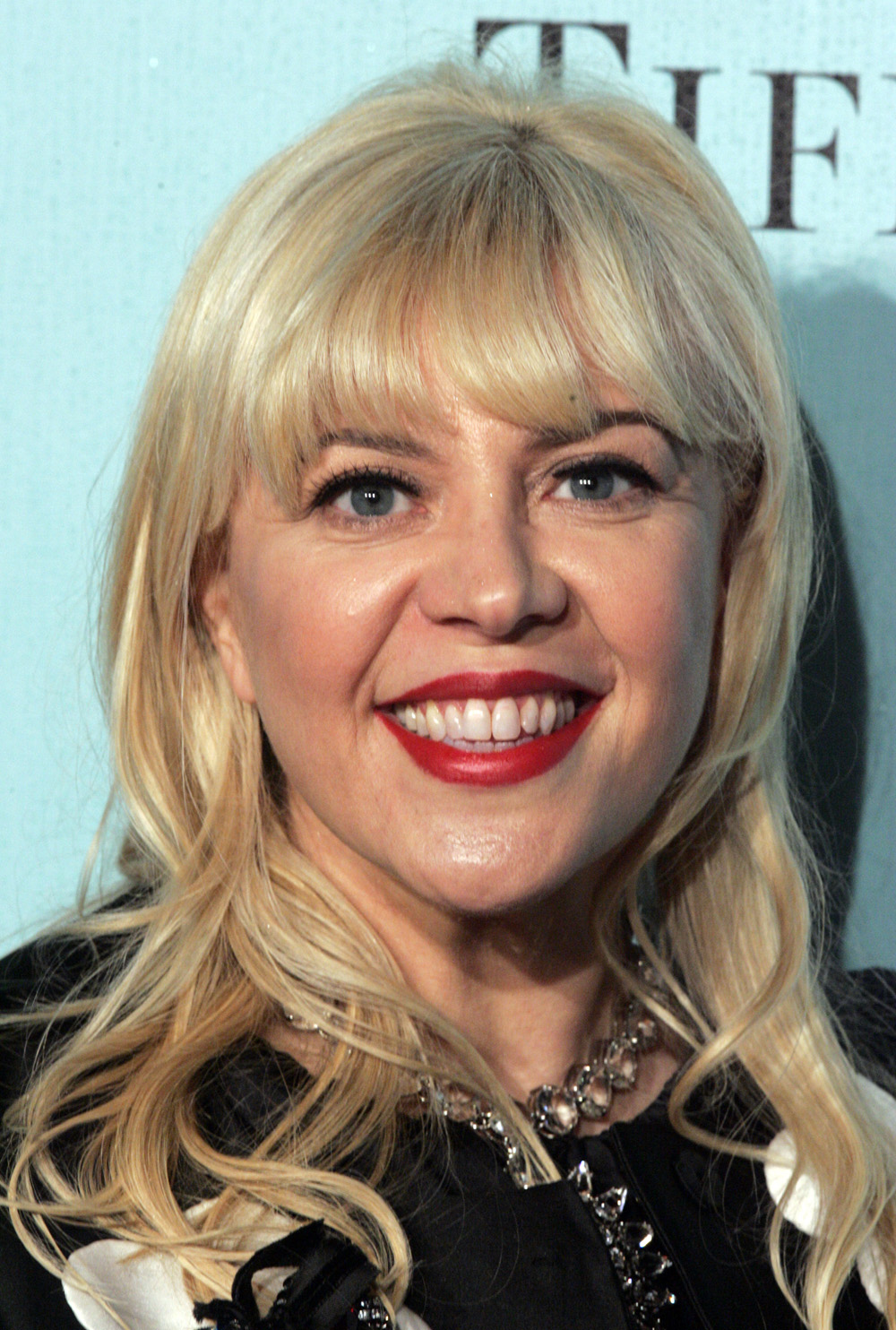
Catherine Martin, Best Costume Design winner

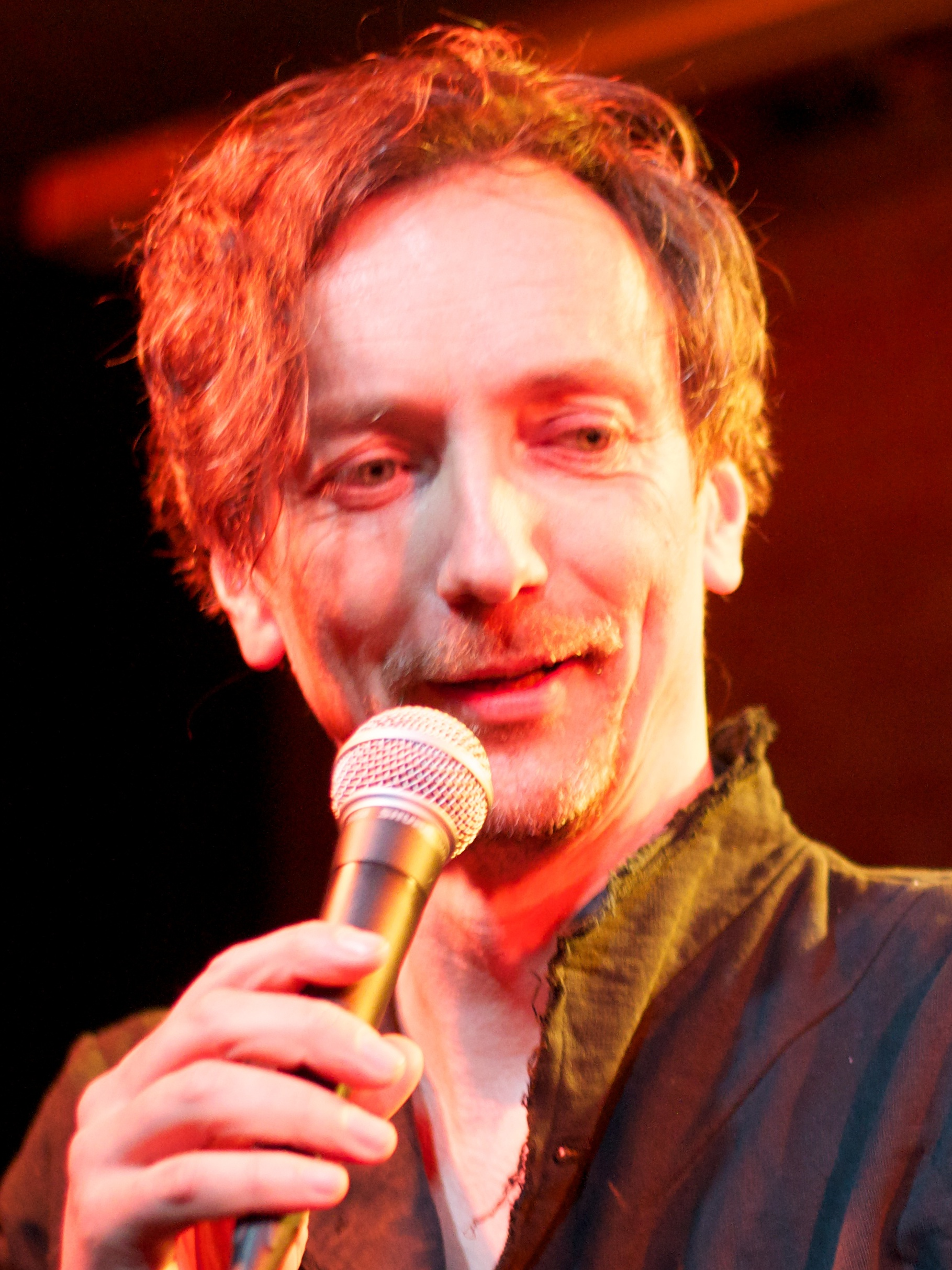
Volker Bertelmann, Best Original Score winner

The BAFTA longlists were unveiled on 6 January 2023, featuring between ten and sixteen nominees in each category. The nominees were announced on 19 January 2023. The winners were announced on 19 February 2023.

=== BAFTA Fellowship ===
- **Sandy Powell**

=== Awards ===
Winners are listed first and highlighted in boldface.

| **Best Film**: **All Quiet on the Western Front – Malte Grunert**; The Banshees of Inisherin – Graham Broadbent, Pete Czernin and Martin McDonagh; Elvis – Gail Berman, Baz Luhrmann, Catherine Martin, Patrick McCormick and Schuyler Weiss; Everything Everywhere All at Once – Daniel Kwan, Daniel Scheinert and Jonathan Wang; Tár – Todd Field, Scott Lambert and Alexandra Milchan | **Best Director**: **Edward Berger – All Quiet on the Western Front**; Park Chan-wook – Decision to Leave; Todd Field – Tár; Daniel Kwan and Daniel Scheinert – Everything Everywhere All at Once; Martin McDonagh – The Banshees of Inisherin; Gina Prince-Bythewood – The Woman King |
| **Best Actor in a Leading Role**: **Austin Butler – Elvis as Elvis Presley**; Colin Farrell – The Banshees of Inisherin as Pádraic Súilleabháin; Brendan Fraser – The Whale as Charlie; Daryl McCormack – Good Luck to You, Leo Grande as Leo Grande / Connor; Paul Mescal – Aftersun as Calum Paterson; Bill Nighy – Living as Rodney Williams | **Best Actress in a Leading Role**: **Cate Blanchett – Tár as Lydia Tár**; Viola Davis – The Woman King as General Nanisca; Ana de Armas – Blonde as Norma Jeane Mortensen / Marilyn Monroe; Danielle Deadwyler – Till as Mamie Till-Mobley; Emma Thompson – Good Luck to You, Leo Grande as Nancy Stokes / Susan Robinson; Michelle Yeoh – Everything Everywhere All at Once as Evelyn Quan Wang |
| **Best Actor in a Supporting Role**: **Barry Keoghan – The Banshees of Inisherin as Dominic Kearney**; Brendan Gleeson – The Banshees of Inisherin as Colm Doherty; Ke Huy Quan – Everything Everywhere All at Once as Waymond Wang; Eddie Redmayne – The Good Nurse as Charlie Cullen; Albrecht Schuch – All Quiet on the Western Front as Stanislaus "Kat" Katczinsky; Micheal Ward – Empire of Light as Stephen | **Best Actress in a Supporting Role**: **Kerry Condon – The Banshees of Inisherin as Siobhán Súilleabháin**; Angela Bassett – Black Panther: Wakanda Forever as Queen Ramonda; Hong Chau – The Whale as Liz; Jamie Lee Curtis – Everything Everywhere All at Once as Deirdre Beaubeirdre; Dolly de Leon – Triangle of Sadness as Abigail; Carey Mulligan – She Said as Megan Twohey |
| **Best Original Screenplay**: **The Banshees of Inisherin – Martin McDonagh**; Everything Everywhere All at Once – Daniel Kwan and Daniel Scheinert; The Fabelmans – Tony Kushner and Steven Spielberg; Tár – Todd Field; Triangle of Sadness – Ruben Östlund | **Best Adapted Screenplay**: **All Quiet on the Western Front – Edward Berger, Lesley Paterson and Ian Stokell**; Living – Kazuo Ishiguro; The Quiet Girl – Colm Bairéad; She Said – Rebecca Lenkiewicz; The Whale – Samuel D. Hunter |
| **Best Animated Film**: **Guillermo del Toro's Pinocchio – Guillermo del Toro, Mark Gustafson, Gary Ungar and Alex Bulkley**; Marcel the Shell with Shoes On – Dean Fleischer Camp, Andrew Goldman, Elisabeth Holm, Caroline Kaplan and Paul Mezey; Puss in Boots: The Last Wish – Joel Crawford and Mark Swift; Turning Red – Domee Shi and Lindsey Collins | **Best Documentary**: **Navalny – Daniel Roher, Diane Becker, Shane Boris, Melanie Miller and Odessa Rae**; All That Breathes – Shaunak Sen, Teddy Leifer and Aman Mann; All the Beauty and the Bloodshed – Laura Poitras, Howard Gertler, Nan Goldin, Yoni Golijov and John Lyons; Fire of Love – Sara Dosa, Shane Boris and Ina Fichman; Moonage Daydream – Brett Morgen |
| **Best Film Not in the English Language**: **All Quiet on the Western Front – Edward Berger and Malte Grunert**; Argentina, 1985 – Santiago Mitre, Victoria Alonso, Agustina Llambi Campbell, Axel Kuschevatzky and Federico Posternak; Corsage – Marie Kreutzer; Decision to Leave – Park Chan-wook and Ko Dae-seok; The Quiet Girl – Colm Bairéad and Cleona Ní Chrualaoí | **Best Casting**: **Elvis – Nikki Barrett and Denise Chamian**; Aftersun – Lucy Pardee; All Quiet on the Western Front – Simone Bär; Everything Everywhere All at Once – Sarah Halley Finn; Triangle of Sadness – Pauline Hansson |
| **Best Cinematography**: **All Quiet on the Western Front – James Friend**; The Batman – Greig Fraser; Elvis – Mandy Walker; Empire of Light – Roger Deakins; Top Gun: Maverick – Claudio Miranda | **Best Costume Design**: **Elvis – Catherine Martin**; All Quiet on the Western Front – Lisy Christl; Amsterdam – J.R. Hawbaker and Albert Wolsky; Babylon – Mary Zophres; Mrs. Harris Goes to Paris – Jenny Beavan |
| **Best Editing**: **Everything Everywhere All at Once – Paul Rogers**; All Quiet on the Western Front – Sven Budelmann; The Banshees of Inisherin – Mikkel E. G. Nielsen; Elvis – Jonathan Redmond and Matt Villa; Top Gun: Maverick – Eddie Hamilton | **Best Make Up & Hair**: **Elvis – Jason Baird, Mark Coulier, Louise Coulston and Shane Thomas**; All Quiet on the Western Front – Heike Merker; The Batman – Naomi Donne, Mike Marino and Zoe Tahir; Roald Dahl's Matilda the Musical – Naomi Donne, Barrie Gower and Sharon Martin; The Whale – Anne Marie Bradley, Judy Chin and Adrien Morot |
| **Best Original Score**: **All Quiet on the Western Front – Volker Bertelmann**; Babylon – Justin Hurwitz; The Banshees of Inisherin – Carter Burwell; Everything Everywhere All at Once – Son Lux; Guillermo del Toro's Pinocchio – Alexandre Desplat | **Best Production Design**: **Babylon – Florencia Martin and Anthony Carlino**; All Quiet on the Western Front – Christian M. Goldbeck and Ernestine Hipper; The Batman – James Chinlund and Lee Sandales; Elvis – Catherine Martin, Karen Murphy and Bev Dunn; Guillermo del Toro's Pinocchio – Curt Enderle and Guy Davis |
| **Best Sound**: **All Quiet on the Western Front – Lars Ginzel, Frank Kruse, Viktor Prášil and Markus Stemler**; Avatar: The Way of Water – Christopher Boyes, Michael Hedges, Julian Howarth, Gary Summers and Gwendolyn Yates Whittle; Elvis – Michael Keller, David Lee, Andy Nelson and Wayne Pashley; Tár – Deb Adair, Stephen Griffiths, Andy Shelley, Steve Single and Roland Winke; Top Gun: Maverick – Chris Burdon, James H. Mather, Al Nelson, Mark Taylor and Mark Weingarten | **Best Special Visual Effects**: **Avatar: The Way of Water – Richard Baneham, Daniel Barrett, Joe Letteri and Eric Saindon**; All Quiet on the Western Front – Markus Frank, Kamil Jafar, Viktor Müller and Frank Petzold; The Batman – Russell Earl, Dan Lemmon, Anders Langlands and Dominic Tuohy; Everything Everywhere All at Once – Benjamin Brewer, Ethan Feldbau, Jonathan Kombrinck and Zak Stoltz; Top Gun: Maverick – Seth Hill, Scott R. Fisher, Bryan Litson and Ryan Tudhope |
| **Outstanding British Film**: **The Banshees of Inisherin – Martin McDonagh, Graham Broadbent and Pete Czernin**; Aftersun – Charlotte Wells, Mark Ceryak, Amy Jackson, Barry Jenkins and Adele Romanski; Brian and Charles – Jim Archer, Rupert Majendie, David Earl and Chris Hayward; Empire of Light – Sam Mendes and Pippa Harris; Good Luck to You, Leo Grande – Sophie Hyde, Debbie Gray, Adrian Politowski and Katy Brand; Living – Oliver Hermanus, Elizabeth Karlsen, Stephen Woolley and Kazuo Ishiguro; Roald Dahl's Matilda the Musical – Matthew Warchus, Tim Bevan, Eric Fellner, Jon Finn, Luke Kelly and Dennis Kelly; See How They Run – Tom George, Gina Carter, Damian Jones and Mark Chappell; The Swimmers – Sally El Hosaini, Tim Bevan, Tim Cole, Eric Fellner, Ali Jaafar and Jack Thorne; The Wonder – Sebastián Lelio, Ed Guiney, Juliette Howell, Andrew Lowe, Tessa Ross, Alice Birch and Emma Donoghue | **Outstanding Debut by a British Writer, Director or Producer**: **Aftersun – Charlotte Wells (Writer/Director)**; Blue Jean – Georgia Oakley (Writer/Director) and Hélène Sifre (Producer); Electric Malady – Marie Lidén (Director); Good Luck to You, Leo Grande – Katy Brand (Writer); Rebellion – Elena Sánchez Bellot (Director) and Maia Kenworthy (Director) |
| **Best British Short Animation**: **The Boy, the Mole, the Fox and the Horse – Peter Baynton, Charlie Mackesy, Cara Speller and Hannah Minghella**; Middle Watch – John Stevenson, Aiesha Penwarden and Giles Healy; Your Mountain Is Waiting – Hannah Jacobs, Zoe Muslim and Harriet Gillian | **Best British Short Film**: **An Irish Goodbye – Tom Berkeley and Ross White**; The Ballad of Olive Morris – Alex Kayode-Kay; Bazigaga – Jo Ingabire Moys and Stephanie Charmail; Bus Girl – Jessica Henwick and Louise Palmkvist Hansen; A Drifting Up – Jacob Lee |
**BAFTA Rising Star Award**: **Emma Mackey**; Naomi Ackie; Sheila Atim; Daryl McCormack; Aimee Lou Wood

== Ceremony information ==
The format of this awards ceremony was altered somewhat by the British Academy of Film and Television Arts, with the inclusion of a live broadcast of the awards for the final four categories rather than the pre-recorded format used in previous years. There was also a backstage studio for interviews with winners, nominees and others, and various music performances during the broadcast. The broadcast was streamed live by BritBox in eight other countries: Australia, Canada, Denmark, Finland, Norway, South Africa, Sweden, and the United States.

Across all categories, German war film All Quiet on the Western Front achieved the most nominations, with fourteen; it was not the only foreign language film to receive major nominations, with this suggested to be reflective of a similar change in consumption of non-English media. All Quiet on the Western Front tied with 2000's Crouching Tiger, Hidden Dragon in being the most nominated non-English film in BAFTA history; both films also tie with 2007's Atonement as the second-most nominated films ever behind 1982's Gandhi, which received sixteen nominations. In addition, mixed-language films The Banshees of Inisherin and Everything Everywhere All at Once each received ten nominations, this year's second-most total. Media noted that the nominations largely omitted some films that were seeing success at other award shows, including Avatar: The Way of Water, The Fabelmans and Top Gun: Maverick, with other popular films being completely shut out.

By intention, the nominated films in 2023 were diverse in both scale and talent: multiple nominations were given to both Hollywood blockbusters and regional indie films, while there was also "40% ethnic diversity in [the] nominees". There had been 120 changes made to the voting process for the 2023 Awards, notably expanding the longlist and making jurors watch a certain percentage of the films on it, as well as randomly assigning required viewing to counter bias in the selection of films voters watch, and adding 1,000 new BAFTA members from underrepresented backgrounds. BAFTA CEO Jane Millichip indicated that there may be future changes to the voting process, saying that it will be reviewed and reassessed each year.

In the week before the ceremony took place, Bulgarian journalist Christo Grozev, who had played a key role in the nominated documentary Navalny, which won Best Documentary, said he had been banned from attending due to being a "security risk". The film's producers instead paid tribute to him when they collected the award.

Ahead of the ceremony, it was announced that it was expected to be one of the most attended in the academy's history. The ceremony was held at the Royal Festival Hall within London's Southbank Centre, the host venue of the British Academy Games Awards and British Academy Television Awards; in changing venue, it was the first time since the 69th British Academy Film Awards (2016) that the ceremony was not held at the Royal Albert Hall. Swazi-English actor Richard E. Grant hosted for the first time, being joined by television personality Alison Hammond for some segments.

After a two-year in-person absence, BAFTA president William, Prince of Wales and his wife, Catherine, Princess of Wales, attended the ceremony. Following the death of the Queen, Millichip was asked if the royal family were still an appropriate fit for the awards body; in answering, she mentioned Elizabeth II's decision to gift the royalties from a documentary on the family to BAFTA forerunner, the Society of Film and Television Arts, in the early 1970s, aiding its move to its current headquarters, and concluded: "I think the royal family has had an incredibly positive effect on BAFTA over the years and continues to."

During the award presentation of Best Actress in a Supporting Role, Carey Mulligan was initially announced as the winner instead of actual winner Kerry Condon, after a mistake in the interpretation of presenter Troy Kotsur's sign language; this was heavily edited out of the television broadcast.

The broadcast concluded with live coverage of four categories (in the following order): Rising Star, Best Actor in a Leading Role, Best Actress in a Leading Role, and Best Film. The ceremony ran from 7:00 p.m to 9:00 p.m. with a switch from pre-recorded to live broadcast at around 8:30 p.m. All Quiet on the Western Front won Best Film, as well as taking the most awards, with seven; "We've been blessed with so many nominations and winning this is just incredible," said producer Malte Grunert while accepting the award on stage. The Banshees of Inisherin and Elvis followed with four awards each, but eventually lost all of their nominations at the 95th Academy Awards. Everything Everywhere All at Once, the eventual dominant winner at the Academy Awards, only won one award: Best Editing. With its seven wins, All Quiet on the Western Front achieved a new record for the most BAFTAs for a film not in the English language; the record was previously held by Cinema Paradiso, which won five BAFTAs in 1991.

There were several special performances during the ceremony. Mercury Prize-winning artist Little Simz later performed "Heart on Fire", a track from her album "No Thank You", accompanied by Joan Armatrading; the performance was praised by fans on social media. A special tribute to the late Queen was led by Dame Helen Mirren; as well as her status, the Queen had a close association with BAFTA, while Mirren won the Academy Award and BAFTA for her portrayal of the Queen in the 2006 biopic The Queen.

=== Ariana DeBose performance ===
External videos
- Ariana DeBose celebrates female nominees at the 76th British Academy Film Awards

Ariana DeBose opened the ceremony with a contemporary musical performance celebrating nominated women; she would later return to present the award for Best Actor in a Supporting Role following her Best Actress in a Supporting Role win the previous year. DeBose had previously won the aforementioned award during the 75th British Academy Film Awards ceremony in March 2022 for her role as Anita in the 2021 Steven Spielberg musical adaptation West Side Story; she was also nominated for the Rising Star Award.

A large number of female actresses and crew were nominated at this years ceremony, including Angela Bassett for Black Panther: Wakanda Forever, Viola Davis for The Woman King, Michelle Yeoh for Everything Everywhere All at Once and Charlotte Wells, director/writer of Aftersun. DeBose opened the ceremony with a performance celebrating women in film, covering "Sisters Are Doin' It for Themselves" (by Eurythmics and Aretha Franklin) and "We Are Family" (by Sister Sledge) before segueing into a rap name-checking multiple female nominees. Lines from the rap included: "Angela Bassett did the thing; Viola Davis my Woman King; Blanchett, Cate, you're a genius; Jamie Lee, you are all of us!"

Following the event, DeBose deactivated her Twitter account, but continued to react positively to references about the performance. Show producer Nick Bullen said that criticism towards DeBose was "incredibly unfair", going on to say that she opened the show with "some energy [and] some fun". "Angela Bassett did the thing" was widely quoted by many as a stand-out quote from the rap. The true meaning of "the thing" is unknown, with BBC News saying the vagueness of the lyric contributed to its success, allowing it to be "endlessly adapted for any person and any situation". American singer and rapper Lizzo quoted the line during a performance on the European leg of her Special Tour, as did Adele during her "Weekends with Adele" residency. The opening number was later announced as the winner of "Best TV Musical Performance" at the 15th Dorian TV Awards, given by GALECA: The Society of LGBTQ Entertainment Critics, on 26 June.

The reception was mixed, with social media being largely responsible for the virality of the piece. Many of those name-checked in the rap praised the performance. Angela Bassett mentioned the piece during an acceptance speech at the 54th NAACP Image Awards on 25 February 2023, following her win for Entertainer of the Year, jokingly saying: "I guess Angela Bassett did the thing!"

Jamie Lee Curtis also defended DeBose and the piece, respectively, by saying that "she's fantastic" and that it was a "joyous, celebratory, sisterly, hot, spicy" performance. Stuart Heritage of The Guardian prefaced a lyric-by-lyric analysis of the performance by calling it "so gormless, so busy [&] so deeply and unsettlingly confusing". Conversely, Raven Smith of British Vogue praised the piece, calling it "hypnotic".

== Criticism ==
Despite the diversity in nominations, the winners were all white, something criticised on social media and by activist journalists, with grievances particularly directed at a photograph of all the winners on stage together, with black co-host Alison Hammond the only non-white person in it. Some Twitter users began utilising the hashtag "BaftasSoWhite", akin to the "OscarsSoWhite" hashtag, which trended when there were no non-white performers nominated at the 87th and 88th Academy Awards in 2015 and 2016, respectively. No BAFTA winner from this edition in the film acting categories, however, won at the Academy Awards and Screen Actors Guild Awards during this same year despite all of the combined winners having been nominated across the aforementioned award ceremonies. There was also criticism for the omission of Bernard Cribbins from the In Memoriam segment-Cribbins was among those remembered at the TV Awards in May.

== Statistics ==
Films that received multiple nominations
| Nominations | Film |
|---|---|
| 14 | All Quiet on the Western Front |
| 10 | The Banshees of Inisherin |
| 10 | Everything Everywhere All at Once |
| 9 | Elvis |
| 5 | Tár |
| 4 | Aftersun |
| 4 | The Batman |
| 4 | Good Luck to You, Leo Grande (Note: If counting Daryl McCormack's Rising Star Award nomination, Good Luck to You, Leo Grande would have five nominations.) |
| 4 | Top Gun: Maverick |
| 4 | The Whale |
| 3 | Babylon |
| 3 | Empire of Light |
| 3 | Guillermo del Toro's Pinocchio |
| 3 | Living (Note: If counting Aimee Lou Wood's Rising Star Award nomination, Living would have four nominations.) |
| 3 | Triangle of Sadness |
| 2 | Avatar: The Way of Water |
| 2 | Decision to Leave |
| 2 | The Quiet Girl |
| 2 | Roald Dahl's Matilda the Musical |
| 2 | She Said |
| 2 | The Woman King (Note: If counting Sheila Atim's Rising Star Award nomination, The Woman King would have three nominations.) |

Films that received multiple awards
| Awards | Film |
|---|---|
| 7 | All Quiet on the Western Front |
| 4 | The Banshees of Inisherin |
| 4 | Elvis |

== In Memoriam ==
The In Memoriam montage this year was played to an acoustic cover of the song "Remember", performed by Becky Hill and David Guetta.

The following appeared:

- Vangelis Papathanassiou
- Hugh Hudson
- Angela Lansbury
- Biyi Bandele
- Raquel Welch
- Irene Cara
- James Caan
- Louise Fletcher
- Jean-Luc Godard
- Burt Bacharach
- Monty Norman
- David Warner
- Leslie Phillips
- Gina Lollobrigida
- Paul Sorvino
- Ray Liotta
- Mike Hodges
- Jimmy Flynn
- Irene Papas
- Mylène Demongeot
- Charlbi Dean
- Anne Heche
- William Hurt
- Sylvia Syms
- Mamoun Hassan
- Simone Bär
- Deborah Saban
- Jaspreet Bal Squires
- Christopher Tucker
- Tim Devine
- Sydney Samuelson
- Olivia Newton-John
- Robbie Coltrane

== See also ==
- 12th AACTA International Awards
- 95th Academy Awards
- 50th Annie Awards
- 11th Canadian Screen Awards
- 48th César Awards
- 28th Critics' Choice Awards
- 75th Directors Guild of America Awards
- 36th European Film Awards
- 80th Golden Globe Awards
- 43rd Golden Raspberry Awards
- 37th Goya Awards
- 38th Independent Spirit Awards
- 28th Lumière Awards
- 12th Magritte Awards
- 10th Platino Awards
- 34th Producers Guild of America Awards
- 27th Satellite Awards
- 50th Anniversary Saturn Awards
- 29th Screen Actors Guild Awards
- 75th Writers Guild of America Awards
