= Hannah Jacobs =

British illustrator and animator

Hannah Jacobs is a British illustrator and animator.

Jacobs attended the Royal College of Art and graduated with an MA in 2014. She has worked on film projects for The New York Times, Vogue, Vice and Penguin Books. In 2020, she directed and created the animated video for the viral song Dinosaurs in Love. The video was a Vimeo Staff Pick. She has worked on several of Tom Rosenthal's music videos.
