= Felix Kammerer =

Austrian actor

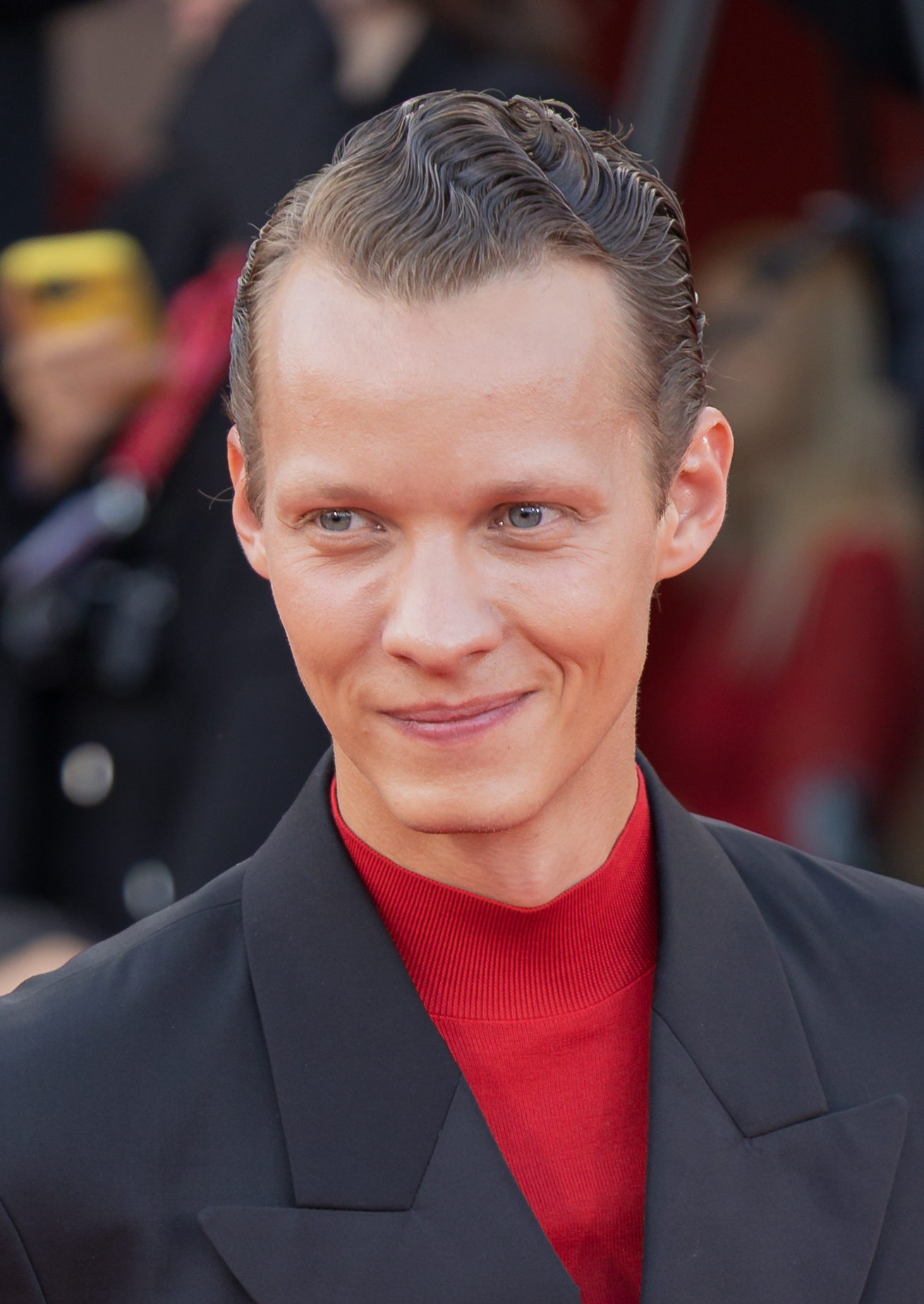
- Kammerer in 2025
- Born: Vienna, Austria
- Education: Hochschule für Schauspielkunst Ernst Busch
- Occupation: Actor

Felix Kammerer is an Austrian actor. After working on the Berlin stage, he made his feature film debut by playing the lead role in the war drama All Quiet on the Western Front (2022). He has since starred in the war miniseries All the Light We Cannot See (2023) and Guillermo del Toro's Frankenstein.

== Early life ==
Felix Kammerer was born in Vienna, Austria, the son of opera singers Angelika Kirchschlager and Hans Peter Kammerer.

Kammerer has a daughter born in late 2024. He is married with Nina Siewert.

== Career ==
=== Education and stage work ===
From 2013 to 2015, Kammerer was part of the Youth Ensemble of Maresa Hörbiger. In 2015, he began studying at the Ernst Busch Academy of Dramatic Arts Berlin, graduating in 2019. During his training he worked at the Berliner Arbeiter-Theater in Rossum's Universal Robots by Karel Čapek and in Michael Kohlhaas - An Attempt to Leave the Circle freely adapted from Heinrich von Kleist, and in 2017 he appeared on stage at the Deutsche Theater Berlin in Marat/Sade directed by Stefan Pucher.

At the Maxim Gorki Theater in Berlin, Kammerer appeared in Youth Without God directed by Nurkan Erpulat in 2019, and at the Salzburg Festivals he made his debut in 2019 in Summer Guests by Maxim Gorki in the role of the student Simin. Martin Kušej brought Kammerer to Vienna's Burgtheater as a permanent ensemble member at the beginning of the 2019/20 season, where he debuted as Duke of Medina-Sidonia in Schiller's Don Karlos. In October 2019, Kammerer appeared at the Vienna Academy Theater in a production by Ene-Liis Semper and Tiit Ojasoo as Behemoth in Master and Margarita by Mikhail Bulgakov, and in The Little Witch by Otfried Preußler, which premiered in November 2019 at the Vestibule of the Burgtheater.

In February 2020, Kammerer appeared at the Akademietheater alongside Caroline Peters, Christoph Luser, and Martin Wuttke in the world premiere of Elfriede Jelinek's play Schwarzwasser, which deals with, among other things, the Ibiza affair. At the Kasino am Schwarzenbergplatz in October 2020, he played in Hans Christian Andersen's The Emperor's New Clothes as the emperor's footman.

In January 2023, Kammerer premiered at the Burgtheater as Hans Castorp in a dramatic adaptation of Thomas Mann's The Magic Mountain.

=== All Quiet on the Western Front ===
In 2022, Kammerer made his big-screen debut appearing as Paul Bäumer, the lead role in Edward Berger’s German-language adaptation of the Erich Maria Remarque 1928 novel All Quiet on the Western Front. Berger was cast for the role of Bäumer when Kammerer was identified by Sabrina Zwach, wife of the film’s producer, Malte Grunert. Grunert was so impressed by Kammerer’s performance at the Burgtheater he offered him an immediate audition and gave a personal recommendation to Berger. Berger described seeing Kammerer’s face the first time and being struck by the fact he "was already so old-fashioned and so classic looking, so pure and so innocent". They continued to cast for four to five months and Berger said:

I saw some 500 young actors. And we invited Felix back again and again. And every time, he just got better and better, just growing into the role. At one point, it was clear, it had to be him. It was a real discovery.

Kammerer's performance in All Quiet on the Western Front has been widely praised. Maggie Lovitt for Collider wrote "In his first performance on-screen, Kammerer proves himself as a promising newcomer on the global stage. Paul Bäumer is not an easy role to take on; the physicality of the role alone might crush a performer, and that's without considering the great emotional toll undertaken to portray the shame, depravity, and agony of war. Paul is the heart of the film, and Kammerer effortlessly bares his soul to the audience as the war takes and takes and takes from his character." John Nugent of Empire (magazine) described his performance as "hugely impactful even when caked in mud". Danny Leigh in The Financial Times describes him as a "remarkable newcomer", with Kate Connolly in The Guardian describing how "Bäumer is tenderly and brilliantly played by newcomer Felix Kammerer". Justin Chang for IGN says "Kammerer may be a newcomer, but his performance is nuanced and chilling in equal measures. Bäumer isn't just out of his depth – each and every moment of life on the front lines leaves him desperately trying to catch his breath. Kammerer captures every moment with an agonizing depth that he wears on his sleeve throughout. This truly incredible performance highlights the horror of a young soldier forced to confront every nightmare imaginable. Bäumer is under the lens, as every moment pushes him further away from the young man he was."

=== 2023—present ===
In 2023, he was cast in Ron Howard survivalist film Eden alongside Sydney Sweeney and Daniel Brühl. He appeared in the 2025 Guillermo del Toro re-telling of Frankenstein.

== Awards ==
For his portrayal of Luke in Mosquitoes by Lucy Kirkwood at the Akademietheater in Vienna, he was awarded the Nestroy in the Best Young Male category at the Nestroy Theatre Awards in 2022.

In January 2023, it was announced Kammerer was included on the longlist in the best actor category for the 76th British Academy of Film and Television Arts awards for All Quiet on the Western Front. Kammerer won in the best actor category at the 73rd edition of the German Film Awards for the same film.

== Select filmography ==
=== Film ===
Year	Work	Role	Notes
2021	Dürer	Hans Baldung Grien	Television film
2022	All Quiet on the Western Front	Paul Bäumer	
2024	Eden	Rudolph Lorenz	
2025	Frankenstein	William Frankenstein	

=== Television ===
Year	Title	Role	Notes
2023	Der Pass	Felix	
2023	All the Light We Cannot See	Schmidt	

== Awards and nominations ==
Year	Award	Category	Nominated work	Result	Ref.
2022	Nestroy Theatre Awards	Best Young Male Performer	Mosquitoes	Won	
2023	CinEuphoria Awards	Best Actor - International Competition	All Quiet on the Western Front	Won	
2023	German Film Awards	Best Performance by an Actor in a Leading Role	All Quiet on the Western Front	Won	
2023	Irish Film and Television Awards	Best International Actor	All Quiet on the Western Front	Nominated	
2023	North Dakota Film Society	Best Actor	All Quiet on the Western Front	Nominated	
2026	Actor Awards	Outstanding Performance by a Cast in a Motion Picture	Frankenstein	Nominated	
