= The Least Expected Day: Inside the Movistar Team 2019 =

- Genre: Documentary series
- Created by: Netflix
- Directed by: José Larraza; Marc Pons
- Theme music composer: Tom Rosenthal
- Opening theme: Go Solo
- Country of origin: Spain
- Original language: Spanish
- No. of seasons: 2
- No. of episodes: 12

Production
- Running time: 22–39 minutes

Original release
- Network: Netflix
- Release: 27 March 2020 – 28 May 2021

The Least Expected Day: Inside the Movistar Team 2019 is a documentary series produced by Netflix to give an exclusive behind-the-scenes look at the riders in the Movistar Team. The original Spanish title for the series is El Día Menos Pensado.

The first season covers the 2019 UCI World Tour and premiered on 27 March 2020. The second season continues with the 2020 UCI World Tour and premiered on 28 May 2021.

== Episodes ==
Series	Episodes	Originally released
1	6	27 March 2020
2	6	28 May 2021

=== Season 1 (2020) ===
No. overall	No. in season	Title	Original release date
1	1	"Episode 1"	27 March 2020
The first episode introduces the key players in the team. Eusebio Unzué is the team manager, planning who will take part in which races and the team's main targets for the season. Alejandro Valverde, current world champion and wearing the rainbow stripes, has a tough start to the season as he battles the curse of the rainbow jersey and handling the pressure and visibility that come with it. He crashes days before Liège–Bastogne–Liège, still starts the race, but has to give up due to his injuries. Another big name on the team, Nairo Quintana, has a better start to the season by winning a stage of the Tour Colombia, but flash forwards to the 2019 Tour de France hint his season might not go well. The last team leader, Mikel Landa, is preparing for the 2019 Giro d'Italia where he is aiming to win the general classification. However, he loses more time than expected on the first stage Individual Time Trial, and the 'leader behind the curtain' Richard Carapaz finishes slightly ahead of him.
2	2	"Episode 2"	27 March 2020
The team are aiming for the general classification in the Giro d'Italia with Mikel Landa as their main leader, and Richard Carapaz as a backup. In the third stage, Carapaz has a flat tyre just when the racing heats up. When he is about to rejoin the peloton, a big crash blocks the road causing him and his team mates to have to chase the leaders even more and they lose time. On the next stage, leader Mikel Landa is involved in a crash holding up much of the peloton, while Carapaz uses the confusion to get away in a small group and wins the stage. The episode then skips forward to the stage 8 Individual Time Trial and shows how a small communication mistake, forgetting to alert him about a corner, almost cost Mikel Landa his race. Things come together for the team on stage 13, the first summit finish.
3	3	"Episode 3"	27 March 2020
The 2019 Giro d'Italia continues, and Richard Carapaz is ready for stage 14. He attacks early on in the stage and no one can or wants to follow him. He solos to the stage win and the maglia rosa, and become the first rider from Ecuador to wear it. Meanwhile, back in Spain Alejandro Valverde prepares for Tour de France after a disappointing start of the season and injury preventing him from starting in the Giro. He follows the race's progression and his team on TV. The next big stage goes over the feared Mortirolo Pass, and inclement weather makes stage 16 even harder. Carapaz is not fazed by the rain and freezing temperatures, as he's used to that in Ecuador and successfully defends the maglia rosa. With a comfortable lead on GC for Richard Carapaz, the team decide to work together to give Mikel Landa, 4th on GC, a chance at a stage win and a podium finish on stage 20. Landa finishes the stage in 2nd place, and although he moves up to third place on the GC, the margin to time trial specialist Primož Roglič is too small with a final TT planned for the next day. The final stage turns into a victory run for Richard Carapaz as he secures his overall win, and becomes the first rider from Ecuador to win a Grand Tour.
4	4	"Episode 4"	27 March 2020
The episode follows the team as they set their sight on the 2019 Tour de France with two leaders, Nairo Quintana and Mikel Landa. The episode includes the team's disappointing performance in the Stage 1 team time trial and Stage 10 where Mikel Landa lost a significant amount of time due to a crash. In the next stage, Quintana suffers a crash and the resulting injuries play up during the Stage 13 Individual Time Trial. Tensions then appear in the team as Quintana fails to recover enough to help the team on following stages, and riders like Marc Soler have to help him to the finish, rather than help Landa race for GC or their own chances at a stage win.
5	5	"Episode 5"	27 March 2020
The team abandon the strategy of racing with two leaders, dropping Nairo Quintana as a leader after his disappointing performance in the Pyrenees. However, he surprises the team by going in the breakaway on the first Alpine stage. The team are now in the difficult position of having to ride hard in the peloton to give Mikel Landa the best shot at the GC, but that also means they're chasing down their team mate in the break. Quintana wins the stage after attacking on the Galibier and riding solo to the finish. The press are not impressed by Movistar's team tactics, and team manager Unzué admits in the team bus he should have told his team to stop riding hard in the peloton. Stage 19 starts to play out similar with Nairo Quintana at the front of the race, while Mikel Landa chases with the other main GC contenders, but the race is suddenly brought to halt when a hail storm causes landslides that block the road. The same landslides also cause the final mountain stage, which was a main aim for Alejandro Valverde, to be shortened to only 59.5km. The team work on adapting their tactics, but the stage ends in chaos and disorganisation for them: they only manage 2nd and 3rd place while four of their riders try to go for the win. As a result, riders are unsure about their future with the team as they start looking ahead to the next season. Mikel Landa decides to leave the team and signs for Team Bahrain McLaren. At the Vuelta a España, the team aims to race with two leaders again: Richard Carapaz and Marc Soler. However, Carapaz gets injured before the race starts, and Nairo Quintana and Alejandro Valverde step up. Quintana wins the second stage, while Marc Soler loses 10 minutes. Alejandro Valverde goes on to win stage 7. Brief glimpses of the stages to come show the tensions in the team are set to return in the second part of the race.
6	6	"Episode 6"	27 March 2020
The Vuelta continues with stage 9 in Andorra, where Marc Soler lives and trains. He has his sights set on the stage, and defies team orders to try to win it. Chaos ensues when a hail storm disrupts communication towards the end of the stage, but it soon appears Soler is riding for himself while Nairo Quintana and Alejandro Valverde are trying to gain time on race leader Primož Roglič. Soler is ordered to stop and wait for his team leaders several times. Despite the confusion, Nairo Quintana wins just enough time to become the general classification leader. However, on the rest day he announces he will leave the Movistar team at the end of the season. In the next time trials, Quintana loses more time than expected, losing the race lead to Roglič, and the team leadership to Valverde. In stage 15, Marc Soler is again in the breakaway, but on the final climb can't follow Sepp Kuss and is ordered to wait and help Alejandro Valverde who is on the attack. He follow orders and the team strengthens Valverde's second place on GC. On stage 17, the team manage to gain time for Nairo Quintana and get him back to second place on GC, while Alejandro Valverde drops to third place. For the penultimate stage, stage 19, the team devices a plan to make use of the wind and push on and try to break up the peloton in the town of Escalona. However, at the exact place they have chosen to place their surge, a crash happens bringing down race leader Primož Roglič. Initially, though riders hesitate, Movistar push on, but the organisations decides to neutralise the attack by allowing dropped riders to return to the race lead by drafting behind cars. Riders and the press criticise Movistar for the move. In the final mountain stage, Valverde struggles with his ear piece while Quintana struggles with his form and loses his third place overall to Tadej Pogačar. The team celebrate winning the second place in the overall classification with Alejandro Valverde and the team classification.

=== Season 2 (2021) ===
No. overall	No. in season	Title	Original release date
7	1	"Muerte y destrucción (Death and destruction)"	28 May 2021
After the pandemic, the Movistar team faces a tough return to competition in the Tour de France. Problems arise at the lowest point of the season.
8	2	"Un nuevo líder (A new leader)"	28 May 2021
Marc Soler's presence in the Tour de France is jeopardized by his one of his worst days on the bike. Enric Mas continues to climb the standings.
9	3	"De París al infierno (From Paris to Hell)"	28 May 2021
Once again, the Movistar Team is the best in the Tour de France, as opposed to the inexperienced team that travels to the Giro d'Italia.
10	4	"A ganar (To win)"	28 May 2021
The team finally secures victory in the Vuelta after a bad season. The Giro results are disappointing, but we meet the team's up-and-coming talent.
11	5	"Sin recompensa (No reward)"	28 May 2021
The Movistar team dominates the Vuelta, but its bold strategies and brilliant individual performances do not reap the expected results.
12	6	"El día menos pensado (The least expected day)"	28 May 2021
Once again, the team is embroiled in controversy in the decisive stage of the Vuelta a España. Did they deliberately prevent Carapaz's victory?

== Release ==
On 24 December 2019, the series was announced and on 27 March 2020, the series premiered on Netflix.
