= Ernestine Hipper =

German set decorator

Ernest Hipper
- Occupation: Set decorator

Ernest Hipper is a German set decorator. She won an Academy Award in the category Best Production Design for the film All Quiet on the Western Front.

== Selected filmography ==
- All Quiet on the Western Front (2022; co-won with Christian M. Goldbeck)
