= Movistar Team (men's team) =

Men's cycling team

Team information
- UCI code: MOV
- Registered: Spain
- Founded: 1980
- Discipline: Road
- Status: UCI WorldTeam
- Bicycles: Canyon
- Components: SRAM
- Website: Team home page

Key personnel
- General manager: Eusebio Unzué
- Team managers: José Vicente García; Pablo Lastras; Max Sciandri; Patxi Vila

Team name history
1980–1989	Reynolds
1990–2000	Banesto
2001–2003	iBanesto.com
2004–2005	Illes Balears–Banesto
2005	Illes Balears–Caisse d'Epargne
2006	Caisse d'Epargne–Illes Balears
2007–2010	Caisse d'Épargne
2011–	Movistar Team

Movistar Team (UCI team code: MOV) is a professional road bicycle racing team which participates at UCI WorldTeam level and has achieved thirteen general classification (GC) victories in Grand Tours. The title sponsor is the Spanish mobile telephone company Telefónica, with the team riding under the name of the company's brand Movistar.

The team was formed as Reynolds, led by Ángel Arroyo and later by Pedro Delgado, who won a Tour de France and a Vuelta a España, and was subsequently sponsored by Banesto, under which name the team included five-time Tour de France winner Miguel Induráin and Alex Zülle, twice winner of the Vuelta a España. The team offices are in Egüés, in Navarre, Spain. A later sponsor was Caisse d'Épargne, a French semi-cooperative banking group.

Having previously used Pinarello bikes, the team rode Canyon frames in 2014, with Campagnolo parts. Since 2008, Eusebio Unzué has been the manager of the team after the long running manager, José Miguel Echavarri, retired from the sport. The directeurs sportifs of the team are José Vicente García, Pablo Lastras, José Luis Jaimerena, Patxi Vila and Max Sciandri.

== History ==
=== Reynolds (1980–1989) ===
The team began in 1980 as the Reynolds team which José Miguel Echavarri as the directeur sportif. In 1982 signed a young Pedro Delgado who acted as a domestique for team leader Ángel Arroyo during the 1982 Vuelta a España. Arroyo won the Vuelta after his team controlled the race after he took the lead. 48 hours after his Vuelta win, the results of a positive test were made known for Methylphenidate (Ritalin).

Arroyo and the Reynolds team denied that Arroyo doped and asked for a B-analysis which confirmed the positive A-sample. Arroyo became the first winner of the Vuelta a España to be disqualified. Delgado changed teams in 1985 but returned to Reynolds in 1988 where he won the 1988 Tour de France and then the 1989 Vuelta a España with the team. In 1984, Miguel Induráin made his professional debut with the team.

=== Banesto (1990–2003) ===
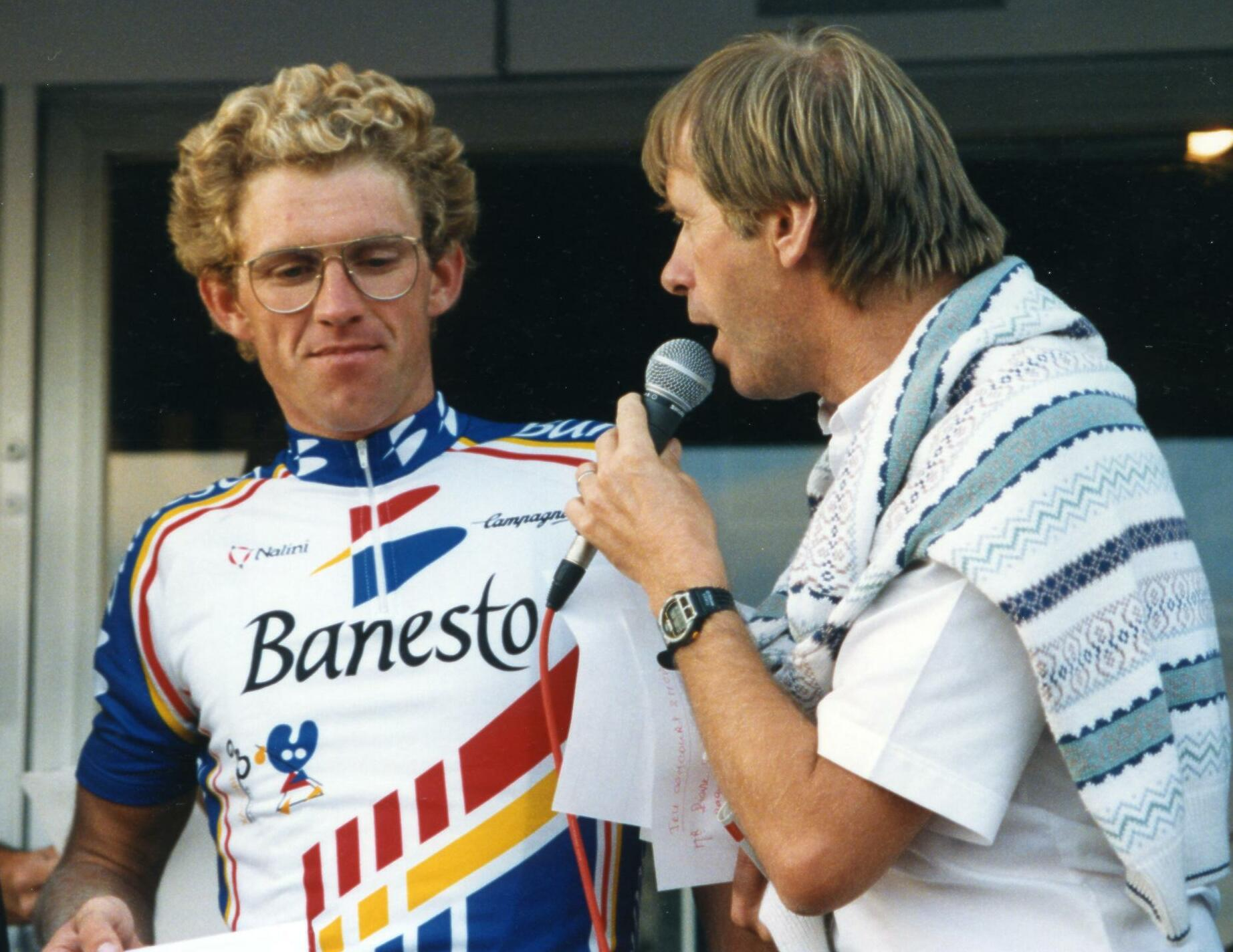
Gérard Rué in a Banesto jersey in 1993

In 1990, Spanish bank Banesto took over as the main sponsor of the team from Reynolds. Delgado was the team leader for the Tour de France while Miguel Induráin and Julián Gorospe were the leaders for the week long stage races. When Gorospe took the lead in that year's Vuelta, the team went behind him in a bid to win the race. Gorospe lost the leader's jersey and Delgado took over the leadership but could not regain the time that Italian Marco Giovannetti had gained and ended the race second overall behind Giovannetti.

Over the following years, Indurain rose to become a dominator of stage races winning five editions of the Tour de France and two editions of the Giro d'Italia. Delgado was the team leader for the Vuelta. The team also achieved success with Jean-François Bernard who won the 1992 edition of Paris–Nice with the team.

The team won the Vuelta again in 1998 with Abraham Olano. During this time Alex Zülle joined the team and finished the 1999 Tour de France second overall while climber José María Jiménez performed in the Vuelta a España. The team became known as iBanesto.com in the final years of the sponsorship of the Banesto bank.

=== Illes Balears (2004–2005) ===
In 2004, Illes Balears, the Balearic Island's Tourism Board, became the team's principal sponsor, the team's name was Illes Balears-Banesto until 2005. Caisse d'Epargne took over from Banesto as the second sponsor in the 2005 season, the team was then known as Illes Balears-Caisse d'Epargne. Caisse d'Epargne then became the main sponsor in 2006 reversing the title sponsor ordering with the name, Caisse d'Epargne-Illes Balears.

The team fielded a number of strong contenders in the 2005 Tour de France including Francisco Mancebo (former National Champion of Spain), Alejandro Valverde, Vladimir Karpets and sprinter Isaac Gálvez. Mancebo produced the best results finishing fourth overall in the General Classification.

=== Caisse d'Epargne (2006–2010) ===
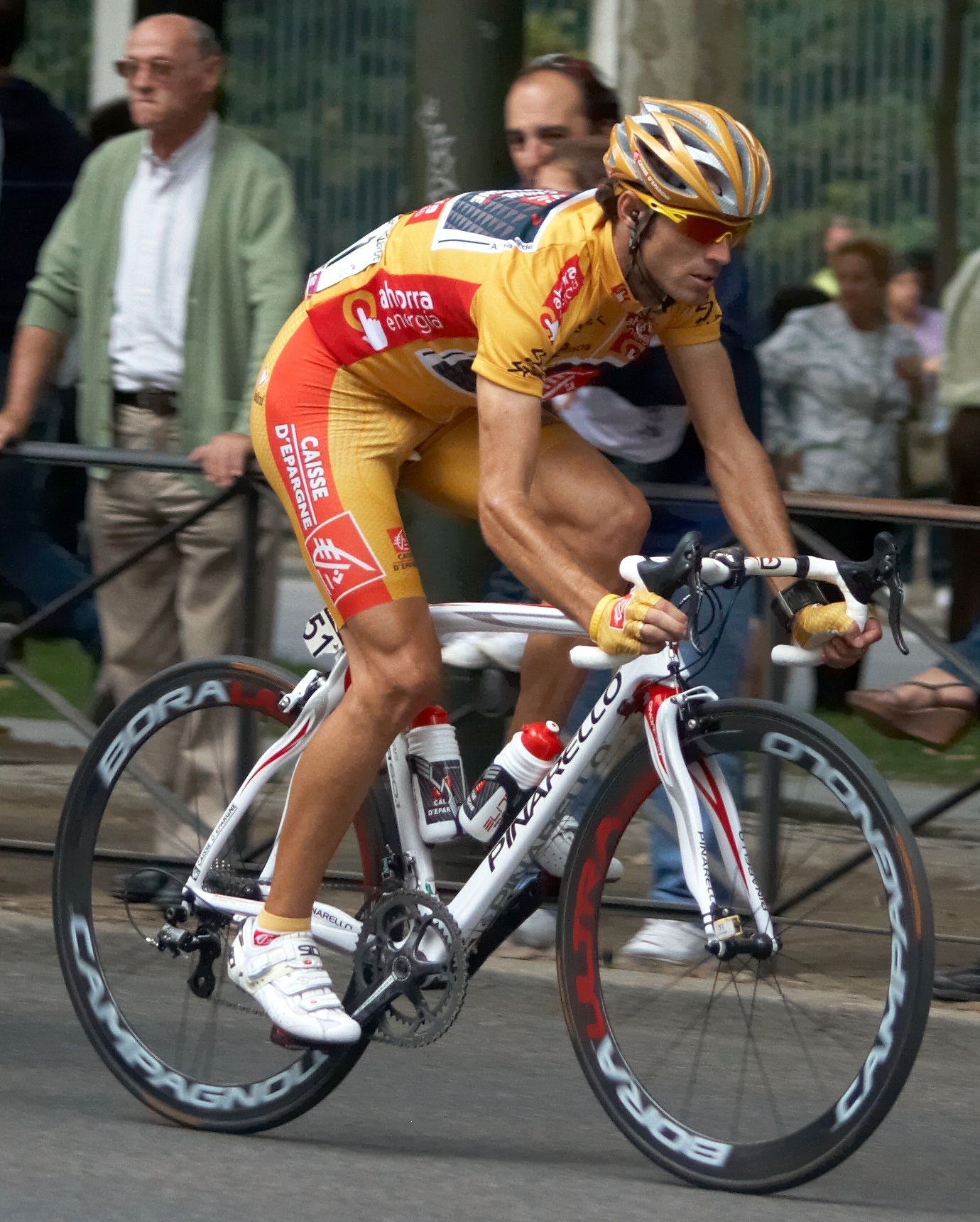
Alejandro Valverde in the race leader's jersey during the final stage of the 2009 Vuelta a España

Caisse d'Epargne-Illes Balears finished fifth overall (56 minutes, 53 seconds behind Team T-Mobile) in the Team Classification at the 2006 Tour de France. Individually, the team's top rider, Óscar Pereiro, finished in second place. The Tour victory of Phonak rider Floyd Landis was almost immediately called into question, after a urine sample taken after his Stage 17 win twice tested positive for banned synthetic testosterone as well as a ratio of testosterone to epitestosterone nearly three times the limit allowed by World Anti-Doping Agency rules.

After hearing of the positive "A" test, Pereiro stated that it was only an initial, unconfirmed result and he would not yet consider Landis guilty or himself the Tour winner. "I have too much respect for Landis to do otherwise", he said. After hearing that the Landis "B" test also came back positive, Pereiro stated that he now considers himself Tour champion and the Landis scandal should not diminish his own achievement. "Right now I feel like the winner of the Tour de France", Pereiro said. "It's a victory for the whole team." After nearly two years of appeals, Pereiro was officially upgraded to Tour champion for 2006.

=== Movistar (2011–current) ===
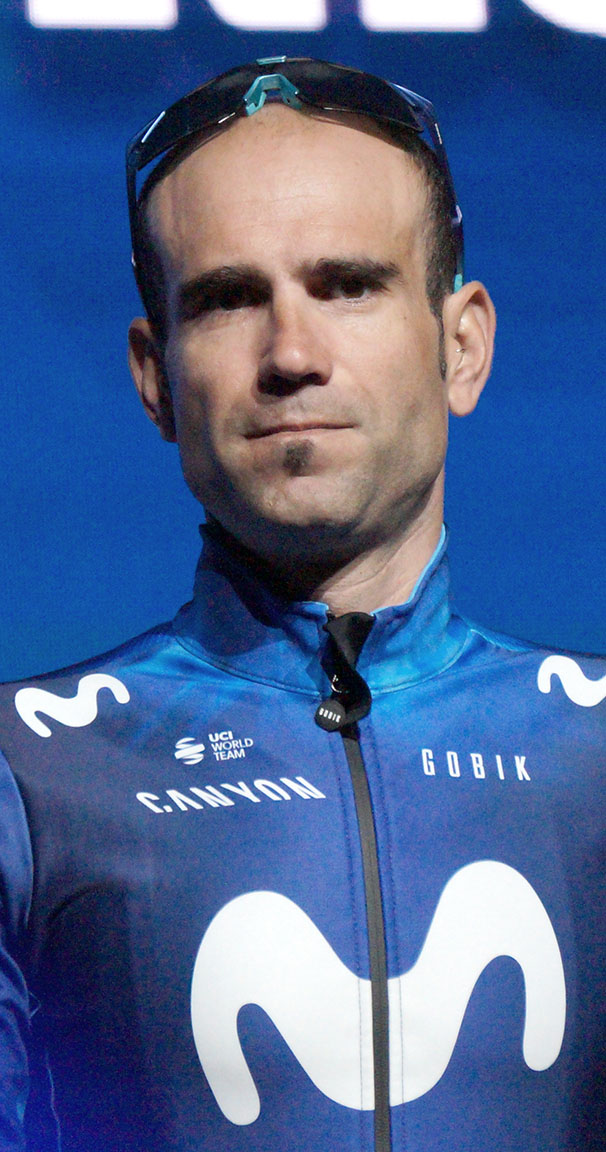
Lluís Mas in Movistar's current jersey, 2023

On 31 May 2010, the Court of Arbitration for Sport upheld the appeals from WADA and the UCI regarding the suspension of Alejandro Valverde for his implication in the Operación Puerto doping case. Valverde was banned for two years, starting 1 January 2010 and after serving the two-year suspension returned to competition in 2012 riding for the Movistar Team.

The 2011 season proved to be a transitional one for the team, with their first victory coming as a single stage win in the Tour Down Under, courtesy of Francisco José Ventoso. The team found success with stage wins in the Volta a Catalunya and Tour of the Basque Country. The team also won two stages of the Giro d'Italia: Ventoso won stage 6 and Vasil Kiryienka won stage 20. The team's final Grand Tour win came courtesy of Rui Costa in the Tour de France.

The 2012 season saw the team re-establish itself as one of the major general classification contenders. The return of Valverde almost immediately brought the team success with a stage win in the Tour Down Under, followed by the overall win of the Vuelta a Andalucía as well as a stage win. Colombian new recruit Nairo Quintana also brought the team overall victory at the Vuelta a Murcia. The team scored multiple overall classification victories; Quintana claimed the Route du Sud, Rui Costa the Tour de Suisse, Javier Moreno the Vuelta a Castilla y León and finally Beñat Intxausti won the Vuelta a Asturias. The team also won stages in all three Grand Tours.

The 2013 season closely followed the previous years, Valverde scored multiple early season results with the Trofeo Serra de Tramuntana and an overall win in the Vuelta a Andalucía. Quintana further reinforced his potential as a Grand Tour GC rider with the overall win in the Tour of the Basque Country as well as claiming second place in the Tour de France, taking the King of the Mountains in addition to the Young rider classification. He further reinforced his reputation as a force to be reckoned with, with an overall win in the Vuelta a Burgos. Intxausti got the team's final overall win of the year and Costa won the UCI World Road Race championships. For the 2014 season the team confirmed that they would shift from Pinarello bikes to Canyon Bicycles.

For 2014, the team adopted a 'divide and conquer' based tactic for the season's Grand Tours; first sending Quintana to the Giro, Valverde to the Tour and then finally both riders to the Vuelta. Quintana achieved the team's first victory – winning stage 4 of the Tour de San Luis as well as the overall classification, Adriano Malori also won the individual time trial stage. Once again Valverde won the Vuelta a Andalucía as well as the Vuelta a Murcia, Roma Maxima, GP Miguel Induráin and La Flèche Wallonne. In May, Quintana won the team's first Grand Tour since Valverde's 2009 Vuelta victory, the 2014 Giro d'Italia. As with the previous season, Quintana defended his Vuelta a Burgos title winning it for the second straight year.

In August 2014, the team announced the signing of Marc Soler (Lizarte) and Rubén Fernández (Caja Rural–Seguros RGA) on a 2-year contract.

At the 2015 Tour de France, the team finished first in the teams classification, and the two top men of the team, Nairo Quintana and Alejandro Valverde finished second and third in the general classification, respectively, with Quintana also winning the white jersey as best young rider, and finishing second in the king of the mountains classification.

During the 2016 Tour, the team finished first in the teams classification by 8' 14" over Team Sky. Nairo Quintana made the podium by finishing third overall in the general classification standings and Ion Izagirre claimed victory on stage 20. Later during the 2016 Vuelta a España, Quintana won stage 10 and the overall. The team concluded the year with their fourth win in the team ranking of 2016 UCI World Tour.

In 2019, Richard Carapaz won the Giro d'Italia, and the team won the team classification in all three Grand Tours. The team's season is captured in a documentary series, The Least Expected Day: Inside the Movistar Team 2019, available on Netflix.

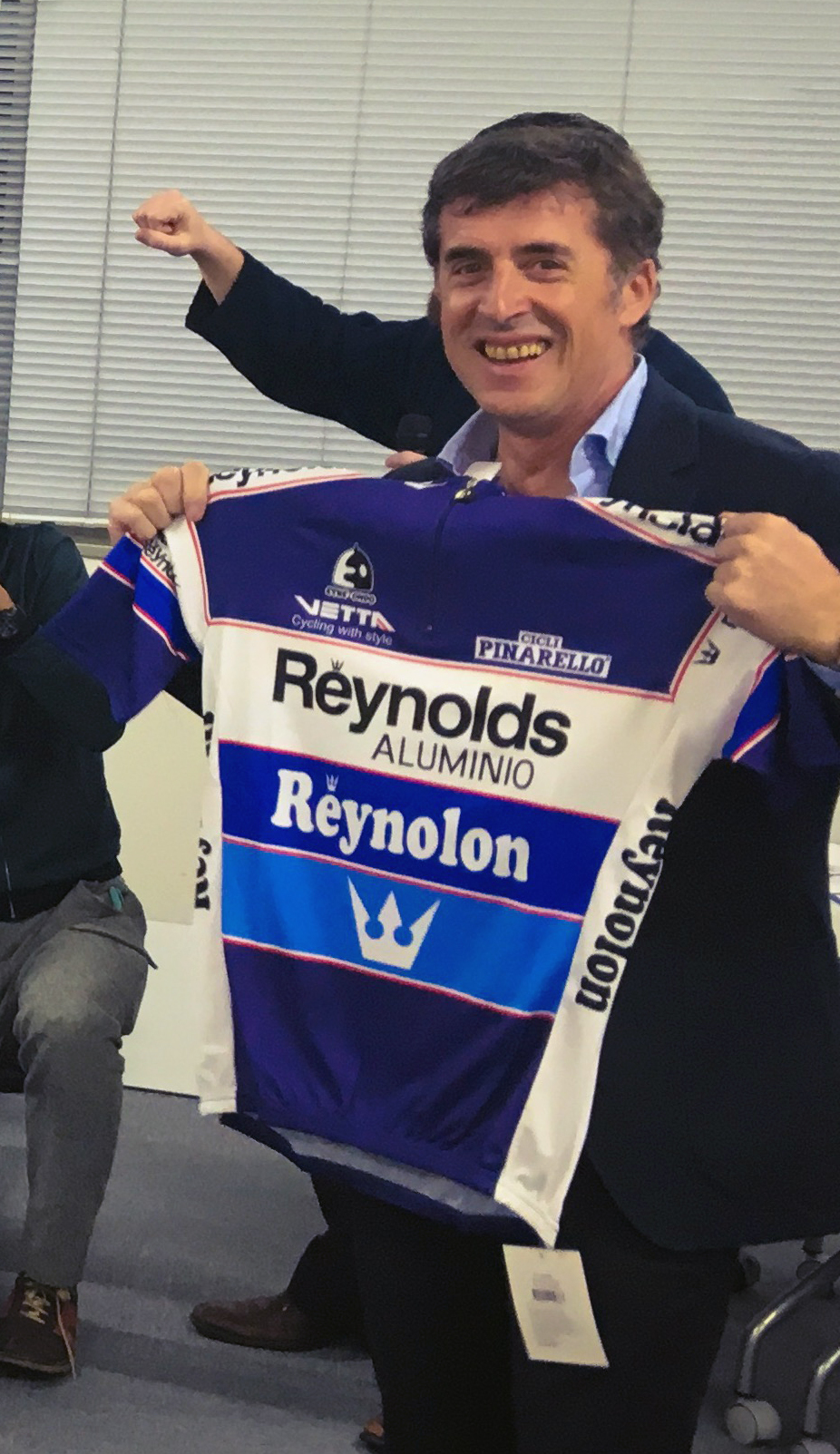
Pedro Delgado showing an old Reynolds jersey in 2016

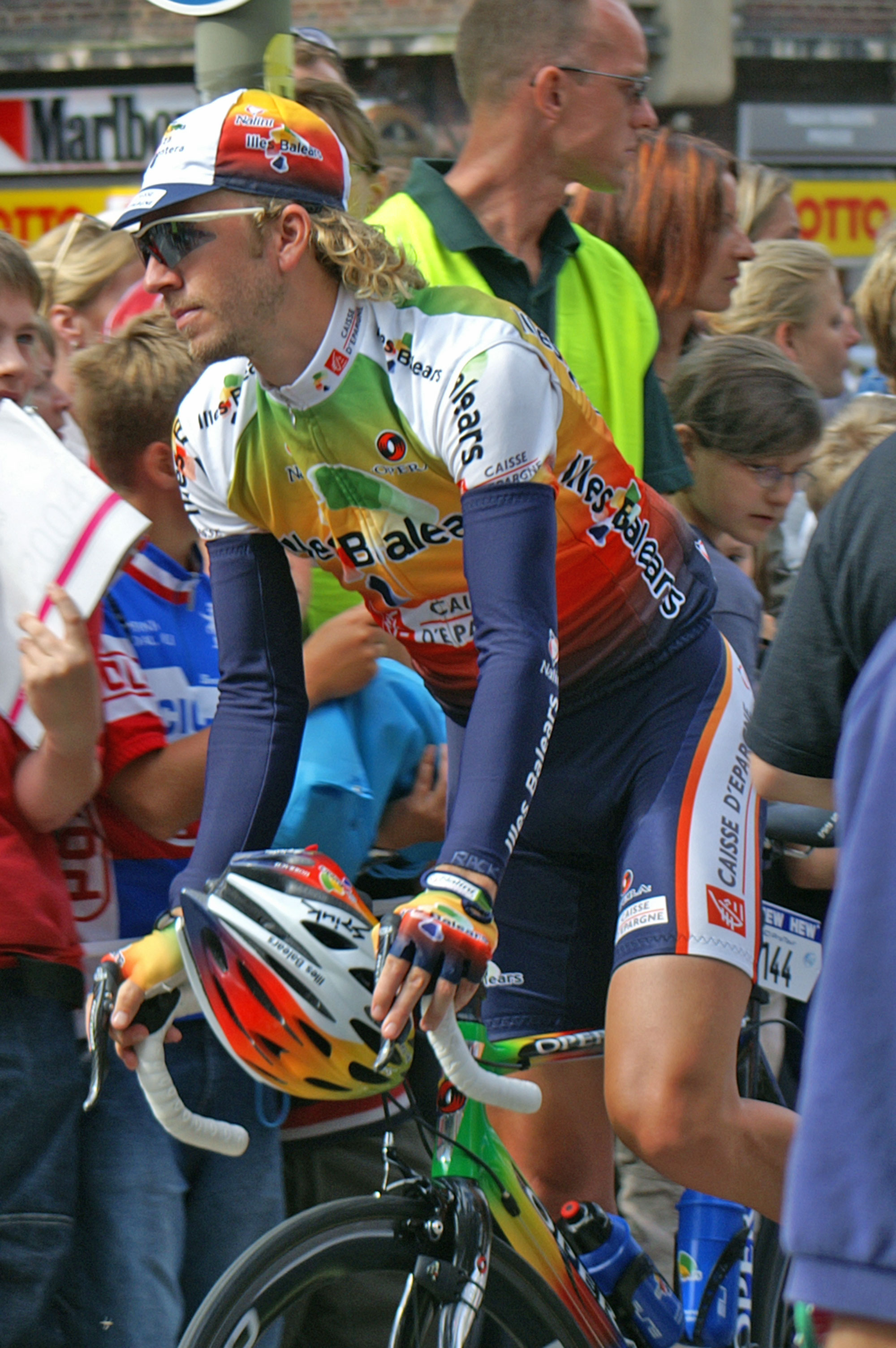
Joan Horrach in an Illes Balears jersey at the 2005 HEW Cyclassics

== Team roster ==
As of 09 February 2026.

Rider	Date of birth
Roger Adrià (ESP)	18 April 1998 (age 28)
Jorge Arcas (ESP)	8 July 1992 (age 34)
Orluis Aular (VEN)	5 November 1996 (age 29)
Jon Barrenetxea (ESP)	20 April 2000 (age 26)
Carlos Canal (ESP)	28 June 2001 (age 25)
Pablo Castrillo (ESP)	2 January 2001 (age 25)
Jefferson Alveiro Cepeda (ECU)	2 March 1996 (age 30)
Davide Formolo (ITA)	25 October 1992 (age 33)
Iván García Cortina (ESP)	20 November 1995 (age 30)
Michel Hessmann (GER)	6 April 2001 (age 25)
Juan Pedro López (ESP)	31 July 1997 (age 29)
Enric Mas (ESP)	7 January 1995 (age 31)
Lorenzo Milesi (ITA)	19 March 2002 (age 24)

Rider	Date of birth
Manlio Moro (ITA)	17 March 2002 (age 24)
Pavel Novák (CZE)	3 December 2004 (age 21)
Nelson Oliveira (POR)	6 March 1989 (age 37)
Nairo Quintana (COL)	4 February 1990 (age 36)
Iván Romeo (ESP)	16 August 2003 (age 23)
Javier Romo (ESP)	6 January 1999 (age 27)
Einer Rubio (COL)	22 February 1998 (age 28)
Pelayo Sánchez (ESP)	27 March 2000 (age 26)
Gonzalo Serrano (ESP)	17 August 1994 (age 32)
Natnael Tesfatsion (ERI)	23 May 1999 (age 27)
Albert Torres (ESP)	26 April 1990 (age 36)
Cian Uijtdebroeks (BEL)	28 February 2003 (age 23)

== National, continental and world champions ==
1982
Spain Road Race José Luis Laguía
1983
Spain Road Race Carlos Hernández
1992
Spain Road Race Miguel Induráin
1995
World Time Trial Miguel Induráin
1997
British Road Race Jeremy Hunt
Spain Road Race José María Jiménez
1998
World Time Trial Abraham Olano
2003
Spain Road Race Rubén Plaza
2004
Spain Road Race Francisco Mancebo
Spain Time Trial José Iván Gutiérrez
2005
Spain Time Trial José Iván Gutiérrez
2006
France Road Race Florent Brard
2007
Spain Road Race Joaquim Rodríguez
Spain Time Trial José Iván Gutiérrez
2008
Spain Road Race Alejandro Valverde
Spain Time Trial Luis León Sánchez
2010
Spain Road Race José Iván Gutiérrez
Spain Time Trial Luis León Sánchez
Portugal Time Trial Rui Costa
2011
Spain Road Race José Joaquín Rojas
2012
Spain Road Race Francisco Ventoso
Belarus Time Trial Branislau Samoilau
2013
British Time Trial Alex Dowsett
Spain Time Trial Jonathan Castroviejo
Portugal Time Trial Rui Costa
Spain Road Race Jesús Herrada
World Road Race Rui Costa
2014
Spain Time Trial Alejandro Valverde
Spain Road Race Ion Izagirre
Italy Time Trial Adriano Malori
2015
British Time Trial Alex Dowsett
Italy Time Trial Adriano Malori
Spain Time Trial Jonathan Castroviejo
Spain Road Race Alejandro Valverde
2016
British Time Trial Alex Dowsett
Spain Time Trial Ion Izagirre
Portugal Time Trial Nelson Oliveira
Spain Road Race José Joaquín Rojas
European Time Trial Jonathan Castroviejo
2017
Spain Time Trial Jonathan Castroviejo
Spain Road Race Jesús Herrada
2018
World Road Race Alejandro Valverde
2019
Spain Road Race Alejandro Valverde
2020
European Track Championships (Madison) Sebastián Mora & Albert Torres
European Track Championships (Points race) Sebastián Mora
2021
Puerto Rico Time Trial Abner González
Puerto Rico Road Race Abner González
2022
Denmark Time Trial Mathias Norsgaard
Brazil Under-23 Time Trial Vinícius Rangel
Brazil Road Race Vinícius Rangel
Puerto Rico Road Race Abner González
2023
Spain Road Race Oier Lazkano
Austria Road Race Gregor Mühlberger
2024
Spain Road Race Alex Aranburu
World U23 Time Trial Iván Romeo
2025
Ecuador Time Trial, Jefferson Alveiro Cepeda

== See also ==
- Movistar Team América
- List of cycling teams in Spain
