= Tom Rosenthal (musician) =

British songwriter

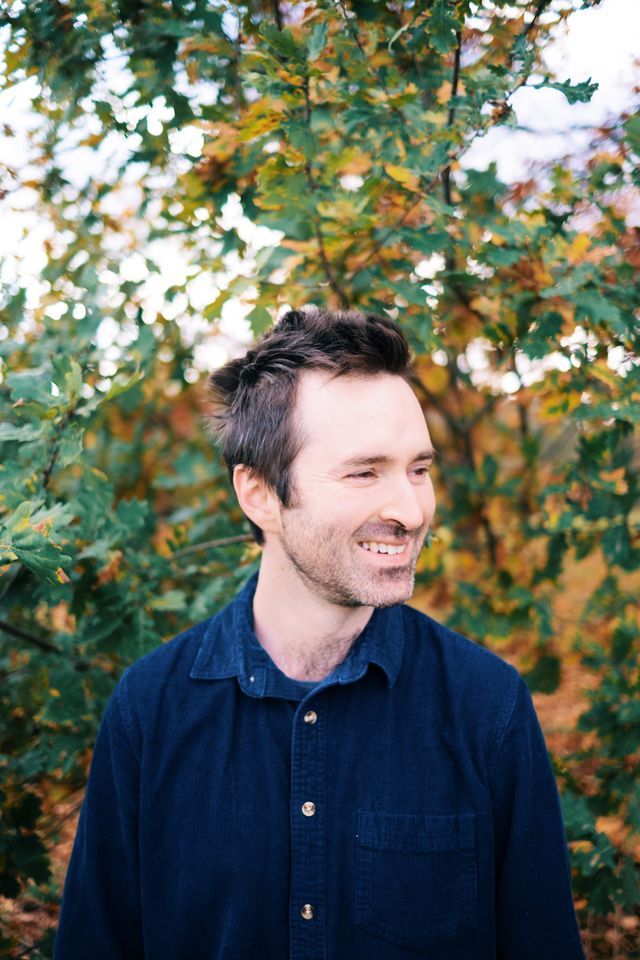

Background information
- Born: 26 August 1986 (age 40)
- Origin: London, England
- Genres: Indie pop, indie folk
- Instruments: Vocals, piano, ukulele
- Years active: 2010–present
- Website: tomrosenthal.co.uk

Tom Rosenthal (born 26 August 1986) is an English singer-songwriter and composer. His music has been described as "short, expertly crafted pop songs".

== Music ==
Rosenthal has released 7 albums to date, all of them self-released on his own label Tinpot Records. Keep a Private Room Behind the Shop was released in 2011, and the latest is Zz-sides (2023).

Rosenthal's audience has grown rapidly in recent years due to a number of his songs going viral on social media platform Tiktok. With his songs 'It's Ok', 'Lights are On', and his cover of Edward Sharpe's Home (which he released via the pseudonym "Edith Whiskers") being used millions of times across the app. In, 2023, as a result of this widespread usage, both 'Lights Are On' and his cover of 'Home' were certified Silver by the British Phonographic Industry (BPI) for selling 200,000 equivalent units.

Rosenthal often makes fun music videos for his songs, which have over 200 million views on YouTube channel. For instance, his video for "Watermelon" was noted in the Top 30 music videos of 2014 by The Huffington Post as, "Best use of a grown man in a watermelon suit. (*Close call though.)"

Rosenthal's music has been used on television soundtracks. "Forgets Slowly", "Lights on But Nobody's Home", and "Take Care" featured in the Skins episode "Alo". "Go Solo" was featured on the soundtrack of the German film Head Full of Honey (2014), the documentary Kid Poker (2015), the NFL documentary Hard Knocks, the film trailer for Felix and Meira, and the Netflix documentary The Least Expected Day: Inside the Movistar Team 2019. "It's OK" features on the film trailers for Comet (2014), Anesthesia (2014). and L'odyssée (2016) From 2016 through to 2018 his songs It's OK and Woes have been used on Neighbours. Rosenthal's song "Go Solo" featured in a TV commercial for the Renault Zoe E-TRON in 2021 and in a 2022 episode of the NBC drama series New Amsterdam. Rosenthal's music was used throughout the 2024 series of Perfect Pub Walks With Bill Bailey.

Rosenthal played his first concert at St Pancras Old Church on Wednesday 13 March 2019, followed by a tour around Europe and a gig at Union Chapel, with over 40 concerts in 2019.

Rosenthal also releases music under the pseudonym 'Edith Whiskers'. Wanting to keep his original songs and covers separate, he created the pseudonym for the release. Edith, who now has a substantial Spotify following of her own, is depicted as an older lady who "enjoys long hot baths, a spot of beekeeping and the occasional bike ride." The first cover version of the single "Home", recorded in 2015, went viral on the social media platform TikTok in 2020. Rosenthal released the song as a single on October 16, 2020 and on a covers album titled Stop Stealing the Covers. "Home" was certified Silver by the British Phonographic Industry (BPI) in 2023. Edith/Rosenthal released a second album of covers on 7 November 2025, called Edith Kills the Vibe.

== Podcast ==
In 2024 Rosenthal started a podcast called 'Strangers on a Bench', launched on 30th September. Rosenthal records and interviews strangers sat on benches in London parks, all of whom remain anonymous on the podcast. Shortly after release the podcast reached the top ten of the Apple Podcasts Great Britain chart. The Guardian newspaper picked it as one of their best podcasts of the week, describing it as 'a charming series of rambling chats', and The Times described it as 'moving and true'. The podcast was also listed in The Atlantic's top 20 podcasts of 2024, The Economist's best podcasts of 2024, and nominated at the British Podcast Awards 2025. In 2026, The New York Times named it in their top 7 podcasts to boost spirits describing it as 'an interview show unlike any other'.

== Personal life ==
At age 4, Rosenthal's daughter Fenn composed the song "Dinosaurs in Love", which went viral on the Internet in 2020.

Rosenthal co-founded the UK charity Grand Plan, which funds four grants of £1,000 to artists of colour looking to realise a creative project.

Rosenthal was diagnosed with Type 1 diabetes during 2021.

== Discography ==
=== Albums ===
| Title | Album details | Notes |
|---|---|---|
| Keep a Private Room Behind the Shop | Released: 10 October 2011; Label: Tinpot Records; Formats: CD, digital download | |
| Who's That in The Fog? | Released: 25 October 2013; Label: Tinpot Records; Formats: CD, digital download, 12" vinyl | |
| Bolu | Released: 10 April 2015; Label: Tinpot Records; Formats: CD, digital download, 12" vinyl | |
| Fenn | Released: 26 May 2017; Label: Tinpot Records; Formats: CD, digital download, 12" vinyl | |
| Z-Sides | Released: 26 October 2018; Label: Tinpot Records; Formats: CD, digital download, 12" vinyl | |
| Denis Was a Bird | Released: 20 August 2021; Label: Tinpot Records; Formats: CD, digital download, 12" vinyl | |
| Zz-sides | Released: 24 November 2023; Label: Tinpot Records; Formats: CD, digital download | |

=== Extended plays ===
| Title | Album Details |
|---|---|
| The Pleasant Trees | Released: 14 March 2014; Label: Tinpot Records; Format: Digital download |
| The Pleasant Trees, Vol. 2 | Released: 25 December 2015; Label: Tinpot Records; Format: Digital download |
| The Pleasant Trees, Vol. 3 | Released: 13 May 2016; Label: Tinpot Records; Format: Digital download |
| Don't Die Curious | Released: 30 March 2018; Label: Tinpot Records; Format: Digital download |

=== Compilation albums ===
| Title | Album details |
|---|---|
| B-Sides | Released: 29 April 2013; Label: Tinpot Records; Format: Digital download |
| The Pleasant Trees (Volumes 1, 2 & 3) | Released: 13 May 2016; Label: Tinpot Records; Format: CD, digital download, 12" vinyl |

=== Non-album singles ===
| Year | Title |
|---|---|
| 2007 | "Smells Like Christmas Time" |
| 2011 | "Superfresh" |
| 2012 | "Christmas Quiet" |
| 2014 | "Hey Luis Don't Bite Me" |
| 2017 | "Melania" |
| 2019 | "Big Pot of Hummus" |
| 2019 | "It's Been a Year" |
| 2020 | "If We All Die Tomorrow" |
| 2020 | "157" |
| 2020 | "If We All Die Tomorrow (Acoustic)" |
| 2020 | "Hope" |
| 2020 | "Hope - Acoustic" with Lizzy McAlpine |
| 2020 | "Albert Camus" |
| 2020 | "Jim and Dwight" |
| 2020 | "FLOURISHING" |
