= Christian M. Goldbeck =

German production designer

- Occupation: Production designer

Christian M. Goldbeck is a German production designer. He won an Academy Award in the category Best Production Design for the film All Quiet on the Western Front.

== Selected filmography ==
- All Quiet on the Western Front (2022; co-won with Ernestine Hipper)
