= Dinosaurs in Love =

2020 song by Fenn Rosenthal

Tom Rosenthal
(@tomrosenthal)
tweeted:

Fenn, my nearly 4 year old daughter, recorded her first ever solo song today. She came up with all the words herself and I helped her a little bit with the tune. It's called 'Dinosaurs in Love'.🦕❤️🦕

28 January 2020

"Dinosaurs in Love" is a 2020 song by Fenn Rosenthal, the at the time near-four-year-old daughter of British musician Tom Rosenthal. The recording went viral in January 2020 after her father shared it on his Twitter account, and it was viewed more than 600,000 times in the day after it was posted. "Dinosaurs in Love" is Fenn's first solo song; the melodies and lyrics came from Fenn, guided by her father. It was recorded in the Rosenthal's home recording studio.

According to CNN, the song's lyrics "start on a high note but end with extinction." Classic FM described the song as "a quality opus that stands up to established rules of music theory".

Jimmy Fallon covered the song on his 30 January 2020 show. One day later, the song was released on Spotify and Apple Music, with all proceeds going to the charities WIRES and Tree Sisters.
