= All Quiet on the Western Front (2022 film) =

2022 film by Edward Berger

- Release poster
- Directed by: Edward Berger
- Screenplay by: Edward Berger; Lesley Paterson; Ian Stokell
- Based on: All Quiet on the Western Front by Erich Maria Remarque
- Produced by: Malte Grunert; Daniel Dreifuss; Edward Berger
- Starring: Felix Kammerer; Albrecht Schuch; Daniel Brühl
- Cinematography: James Friend
- Edited by: Sven Budelmann
- Music by: Volker Bertelmann
- Production company: Amusement Park
- Distributed by: Netflix
- Release dates: September 12, 2022 (TIFF); October 28, 2022 (Netflix)
- Running time: 147 minutes
- Country: Germany
- Language: German
- Budget: US$20 million

All Quiet on the Western Front (German: Im Westen nichts Neues, lit. 'Nothing New in the West') is a 2022 German epic anti-war film based on the 1929 novel of the same name by Erich Maria Remarque. It is the third film adaptation of the book, after the 1930 and 1979 versions. Co-written, directed and co-produced by Edward Berger, it stars Felix Kammerer, Albrecht Schuch, Daniel Brühl, Sebastian Hülk, Aaron Hilmer, Edin Hasanovic, and Devid Striesow.

Set during World War I, it follows the life of an idealistic young German soldier named Paul Bäumer. (Note: Paul Bäumer was also the name of another World War I soldier, who did not inspire the events of the book or film.) After enlisting in the German Army with his friends, Bäumer finds himself exposed to the realities of war, shattering his early hopes of becoming a hero as he does his best to survive. The film adds a parallel storyline not found in the book, which follows the armistice negotiations to end the war.

All Quiet on the Western Front premiered at the Toronto International Film Festival on September 12, 2022, and was released to streaming on Netflix on October 28. The film received positive reviews for its artistry and relevant anti-war message; however, German and Anglophone critics disagreed over the film's faithfulness to Remarque's source material. It received a leading 14 nominations at the 76th British Academy Film Awards (winning seven, including Best Film) and nine at the 95th Academy Awards, including Best Picture, and won four: Best International Feature, Best Cinematography, Best Original Score, and Best Production Design. The four wins tied All Quiet on the Western Front with Fanny and Alexander (1982), Crouching Tiger, Hidden Dragon (2000), and Parasite (2019) as the most-awarded non-English language film in the Oscars' history. It was nominated in twelve categories for the 2023 German Film Awards, and won eight, including Silver Award.

== Plot ==
In 1917, three years into World War I, 17-year-old Paul Bäumer enthusiastically enlists in the Imperial German Army alongside schoolmates Albert Kropp, Franz Müller, and Ludwig Behm. They hear a patriotic speech by a school official and unknowingly receive recycled uniforms from soldiers killed in a previous battle. After they are deployed in northern France near La Malmaison, they are befriended by an older and more experienced soldier, Stanislaus "Kat" Katczinsky. Their romantic view of the war is shattered by the brutal realities of trench warfare on the Western Front and Ludwig is killed by artillery on the first night.

Eighteen months later, on November 7, 1918, German State Secretary Matthias Erzberger, weary of mounting losses, meets with the German High Command to persuade them to begin armistice talks with the Allied powers. Meanwhile, Paul and Kat steal a goose from a farm to share with Albert, Franz, and another veteran, Tjaden Stackfleet, with whom they have grown close behind the front in Champagne. Kat, who is illiterate, gets Paul to read him a letter from his wife and worries that he will be unable to reintegrate into peacetime society. Franz spends the night with a local French woman and brings back her scarf as a souvenir.

On November 9, General Friedrichs drives Erzberger and the German delegation to a train bound for the Forest of Compiègne for ceasefire negotiations. Paul and his friends are sent on a mission to find 60 missing recruits who were sent to reinforce their unit and discover that they were killed by gas after taking their masks off too soon. Friedrichs, who opposes the armistice talks, orders an attack before French reinforcements arrive. That night, Erzberger's delegation reaches Compiègne, while Paul's regiment is sent to the front to prepare to attack the French lines.

On November 10, Supreme Allied Commander Ferdinand Foch gives the Germans 72 hours to accept the non-negotiable Allied terms. Meanwhile, the German attack takes the French front line after savage hand-to-hand fighting but is routed by a combined arms counterattack in which the French use Saint-Chamond tanks. Franz is separated from the group, and Albert is killed trying to surrender when he is set on fire with a flamethrower. Trapped in a crater in no man's land with a French soldier, Paul stabs him and watches him die slowly, becoming remorseful and begging for forgiveness from the dead body.

Erzberger learns of Kaiser Wilhelm II's abdication and receives instructions from field marshal Paul von Hindenburg to accept the Allied terms. Paul returns to his unit and sees them celebrating the war's imminent end. He finds a wounded Tjaden, who gives him Franz's souvenir scarf – indicating Franz has been killed. Paul and Kat bring him food, but Tjaden, knowing his leg will be amputated, fatally stabs himself in the throat with a fork.

On November 11, Erzberger's delegation signs an armistice set to take effect at 11:00 AM. After learning of the ceasefire, Paul and Kat steal from the farm one last time, but Kat is shot by the farmer's son and quietly dies while Paul carries him to an infirmary. Friedrichs, who wants a final German battlefield victory before the war ends in defeat, orders an attack to start at 10:45 AM. Paul kills multiple French soldiers before being bayoneted from behind just seconds before 11:00 AM. He dies as the fighting stops.

A short time later, a newly-arrived German recruit that Paul had earlier saved in the battle finds his mud-caked body and picks up Franz's scarf, but not the dog tag that acts as the identifier of dead soldiers. As a result, Paul's death is not recorded.

== Cast ==
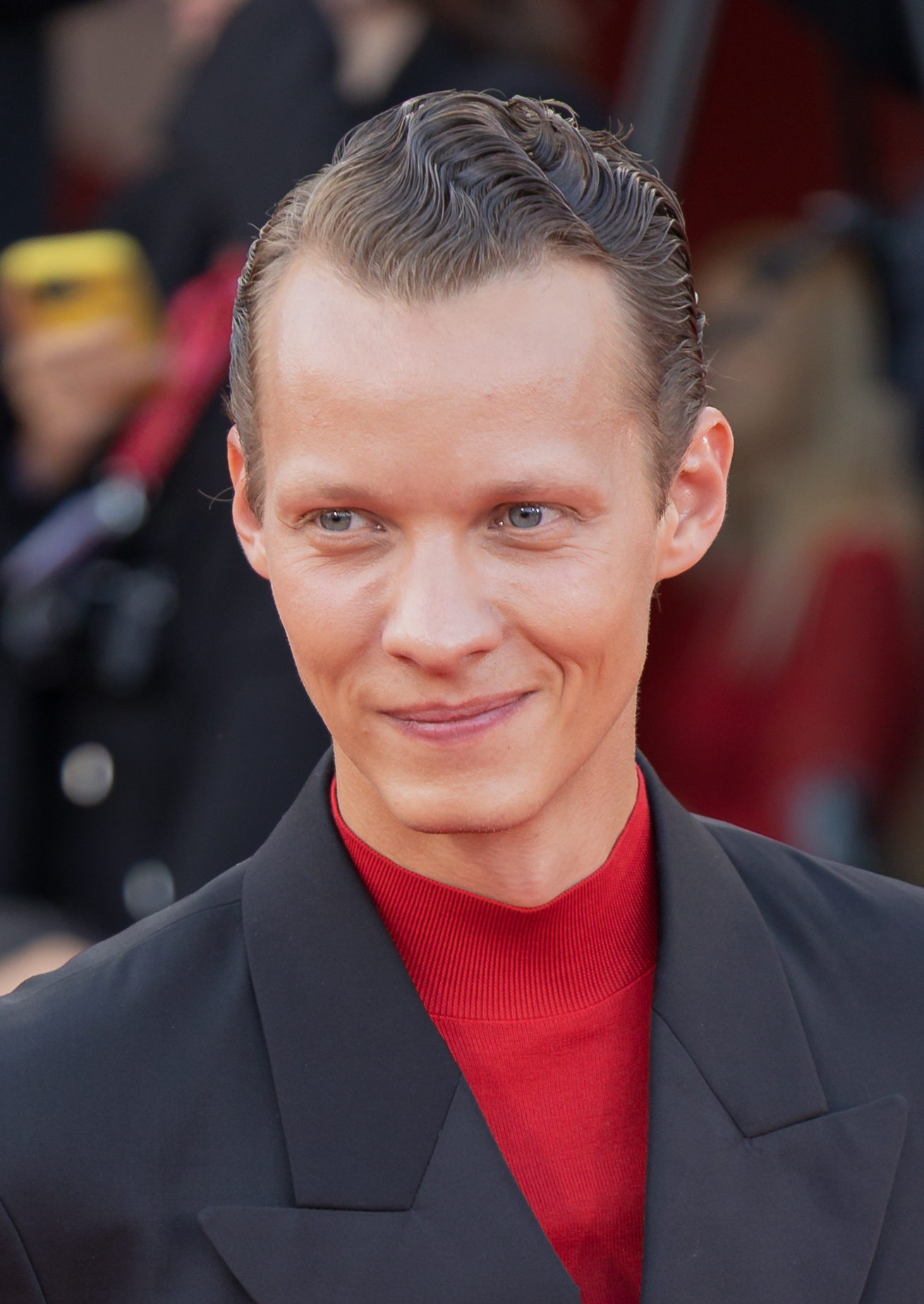
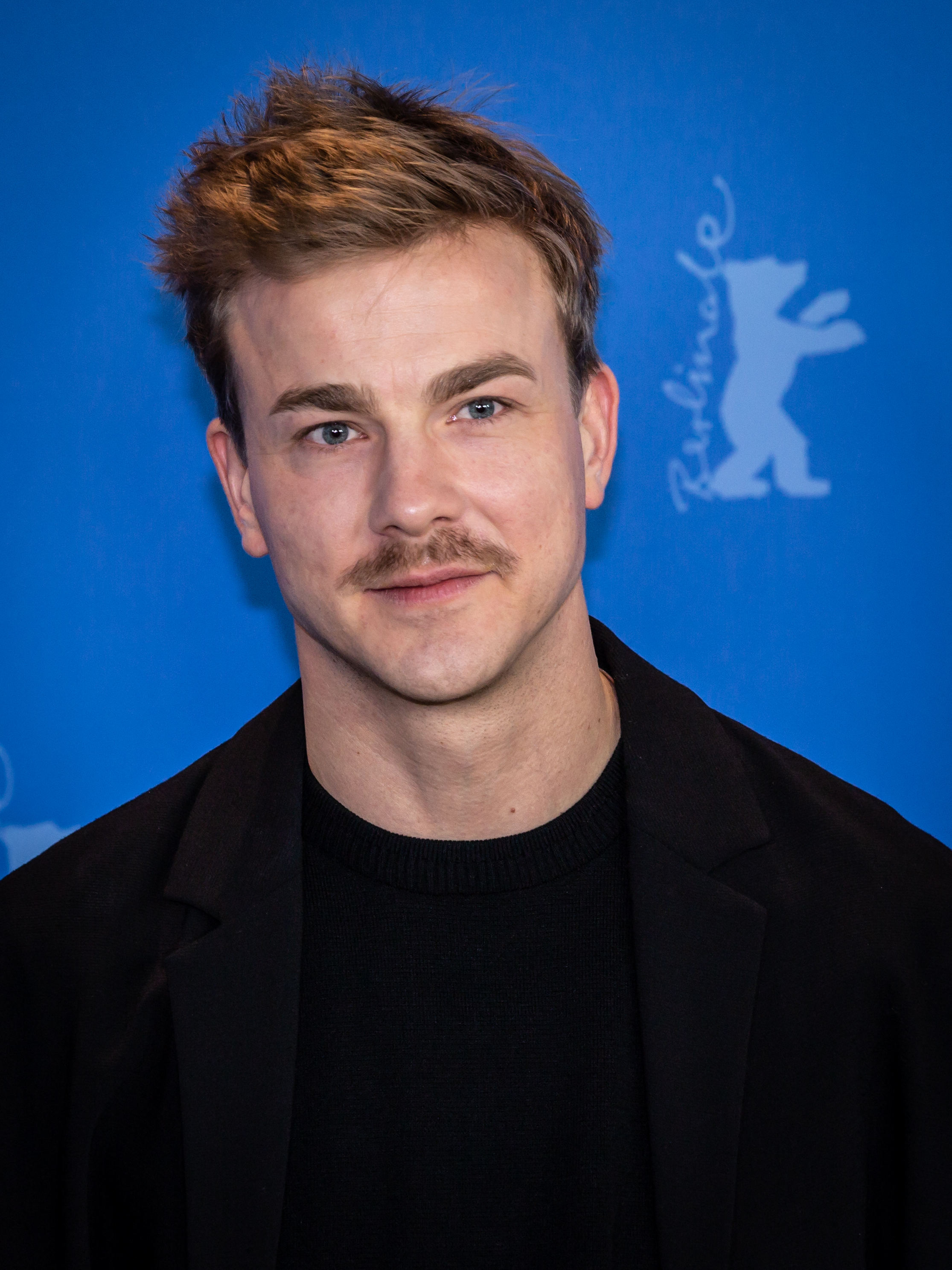
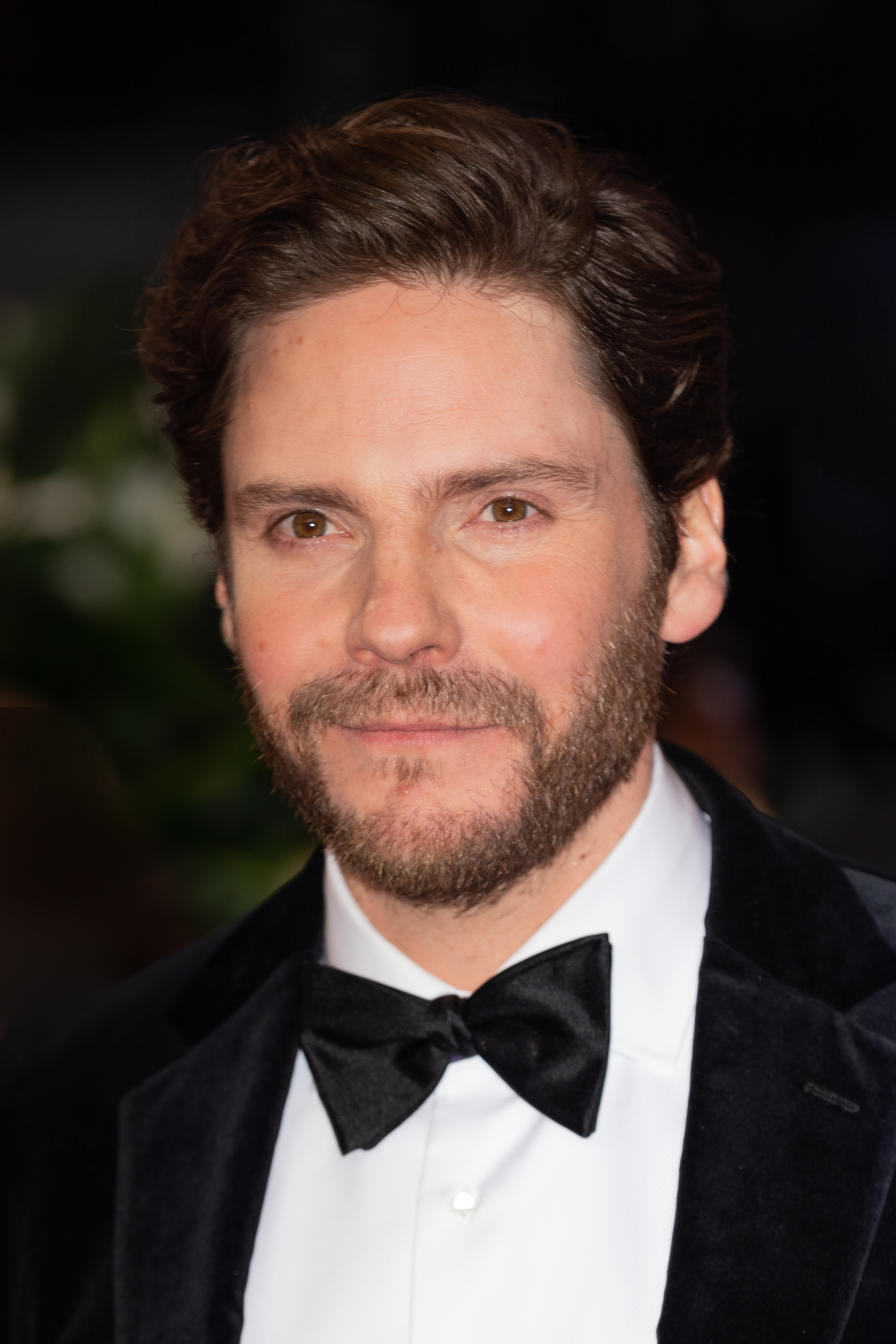
(L-R) Three of the film's stars: Felix Kammerer, Albrecht Schuch, and Daniel Brühl
- Felix Kammerer as Paul Bäumer
- Albrecht Schuch as Stanislaus "Kat" Katczinsky
- Daniel Brühl as Matthias Erzberger
- Aaron Hilmer as Albert Kropp
- Moritz Klaus as Franz Müller
- Adrian Grünewald as Ludwig Behm
- Edin Hasanović as Tjaden Stackfleet
- Thibault de Montalembert as General Ferdinand Foch
- Devid Striesow as General Friedrichs
- Andreas Döhler as Lieutenant Hoppe
- Sebastian Hülk as Major Von Brixdorf

=== English dubbing ===
The English version was produced by Liquid Violet in London. James Daniel Wilson adapted the script and directed the dubbing.

Role	Actor	Voice actor
Paul Bäumer	Felix Kammerer	George Blagden
Stanislaus "Kat" Katczinsky	Albrecht Schuch	Andrew Whipp
Albert Kropp	Aaron Hilmer	Harry McEntire
Franz Müller	Moritz Klaus	Rory Alexander
Ludwig Behm	Adrian Grünewald	Gerran Howell
Tjaden Stackfleet	Edin Hasanović	Oliver Walker
Matthias Erzberger	Daniel Brühl	Kevin Howarth
General Friedrichs	Devid Striesow	Alistair Petrie
Lieutenant Hoppe	Andreas Döhler	Rupert Holliday-Evans
Major Von Brixdorf	Sebastian Hülk	James Doherty

== Production ==
=== Development ===
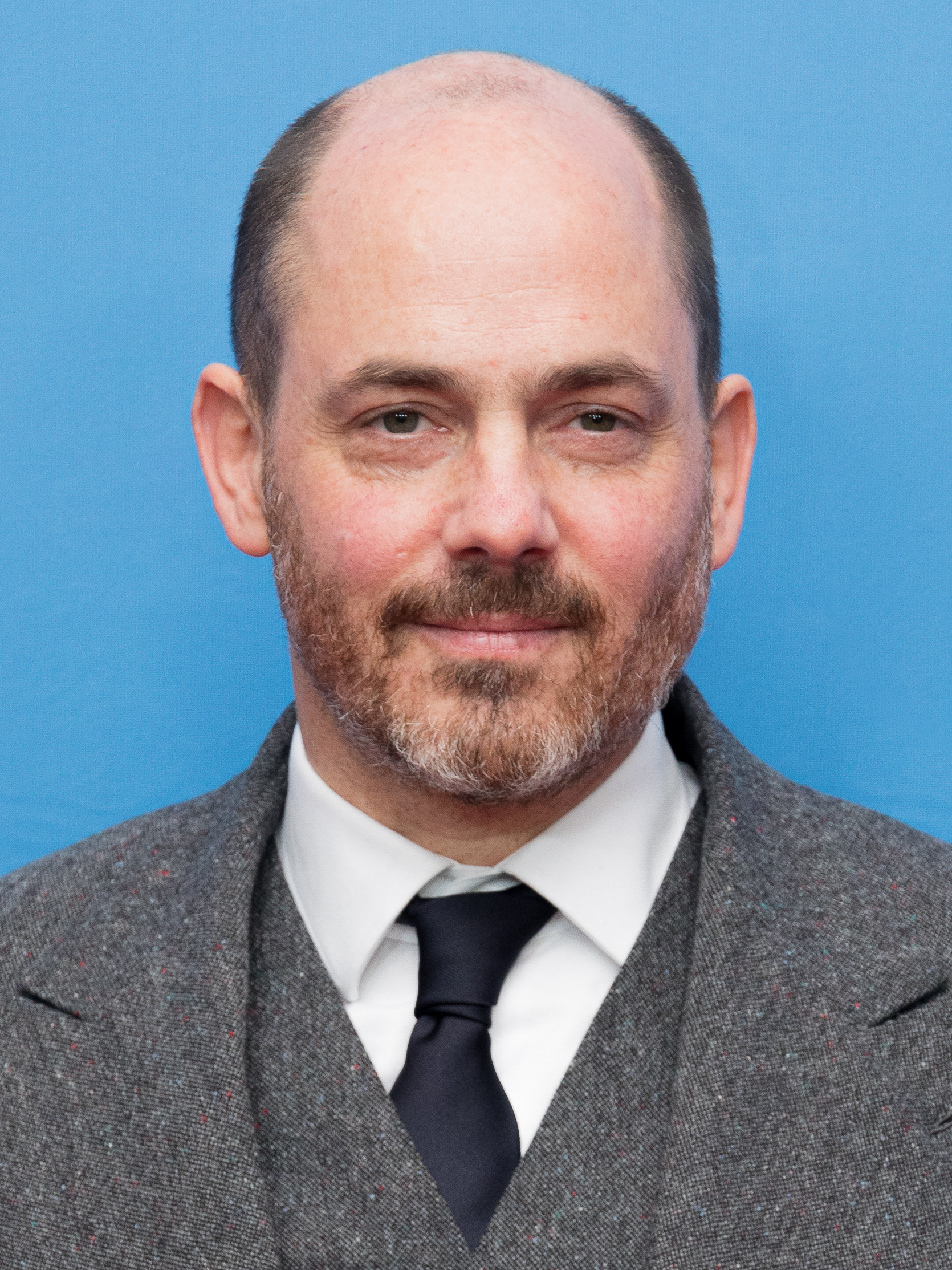
Director, co-producer and co-writer Edward Berger

Writers Lesley Paterson and Ian Stokell spent 16 years bringing their film project to fruition. They initially obtained an option for the film rights to the book in 2006 but faced challenges in securing funding for both the film's production and the annual option renewal, which cost between $10,000 and $15,000. In a resourceful attempt to raise funds, Paterson participated in XTERRA triathlons starting in 2011, ultimately winning the top prize of $20,000. This allowed her to maintain the option by winning five triathlon world championships over the years. Paterson and Stokell estimated that they spent approximately $200,000 to preserve the option during the 16-year period. The film was eventually announced in February 2020 with Edward Berger directing and Daniel Brühl as part of the ensemble cast.

=== Filming ===
Principal photography began on 9 March 2021 in Prague, Czech Republic, and lasted 55 days. The film cost $20 million.

Cinematographer James Friend worked closely with another DP, wildlife cameraman Rob Hollingworth, in order to capture the fox sequence in the beginning of the film. "We had to essentially put a pregnant fox in a purpose-built den that was designed for shooting with camera traps. The fox then gave birth to the cubs in this den and that turned into what you saw on camera...The only way to get those shots is basically to raise the cubs in the environment in which you're filming them, so the mother and the cubs feel completely at home. Then, if a probe lens comes in to get a closeup of a cub or the mom, they're already used to it by that stage. Essentially, we wanted it to look like a David Attenborough piece and not like a movie."

== Release ==
All Quiet on the Western Front premiered at the 47th Toronto International Film Festival on September 12, 2022. It played exclusively at the Paris Theater in New York on October 7 before expanding to other theatres from October 14. It launched on Netflix, which acquired distribution rights prior to production, worldwide on October 28. From its release on Netflix to March 3, 2023, the film logged over 150 million hours viewed worldwide. Viewership tripled after the film's Oscar and BAFTA nominations, and was on the global Top 10 Non-English Film list for 14 weeks and in the Top 10 Films in 91 countries.

A making-of documentary called Making All Quiet on the Western Front was released on Netflix globally on February 20, 2023. A Collector's Edition Blu-ray was released on March 28, 2023, in the United States and April 24, 2023, in the United Kingdom.

== Reception ==
=== Critical reception ===
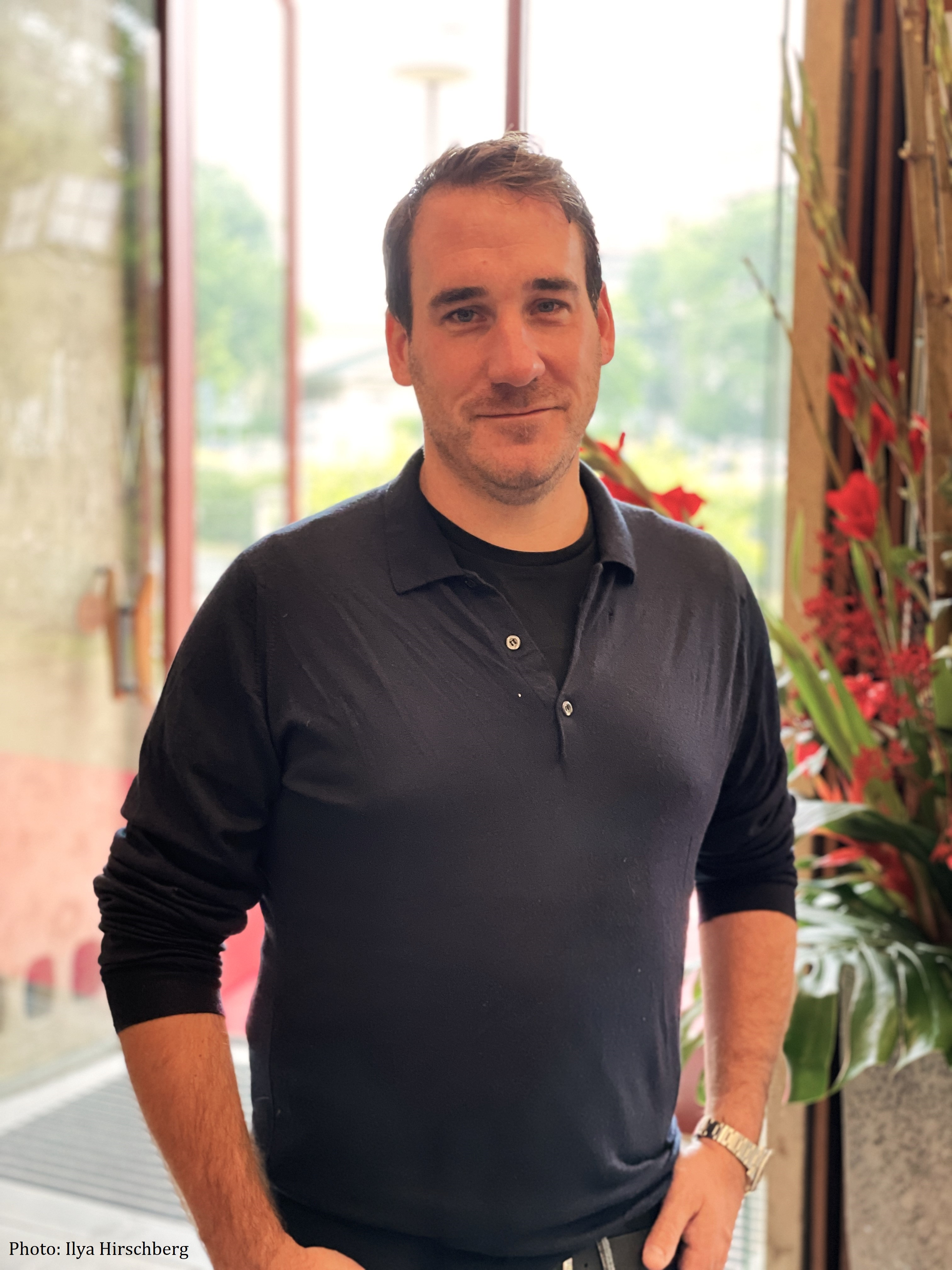
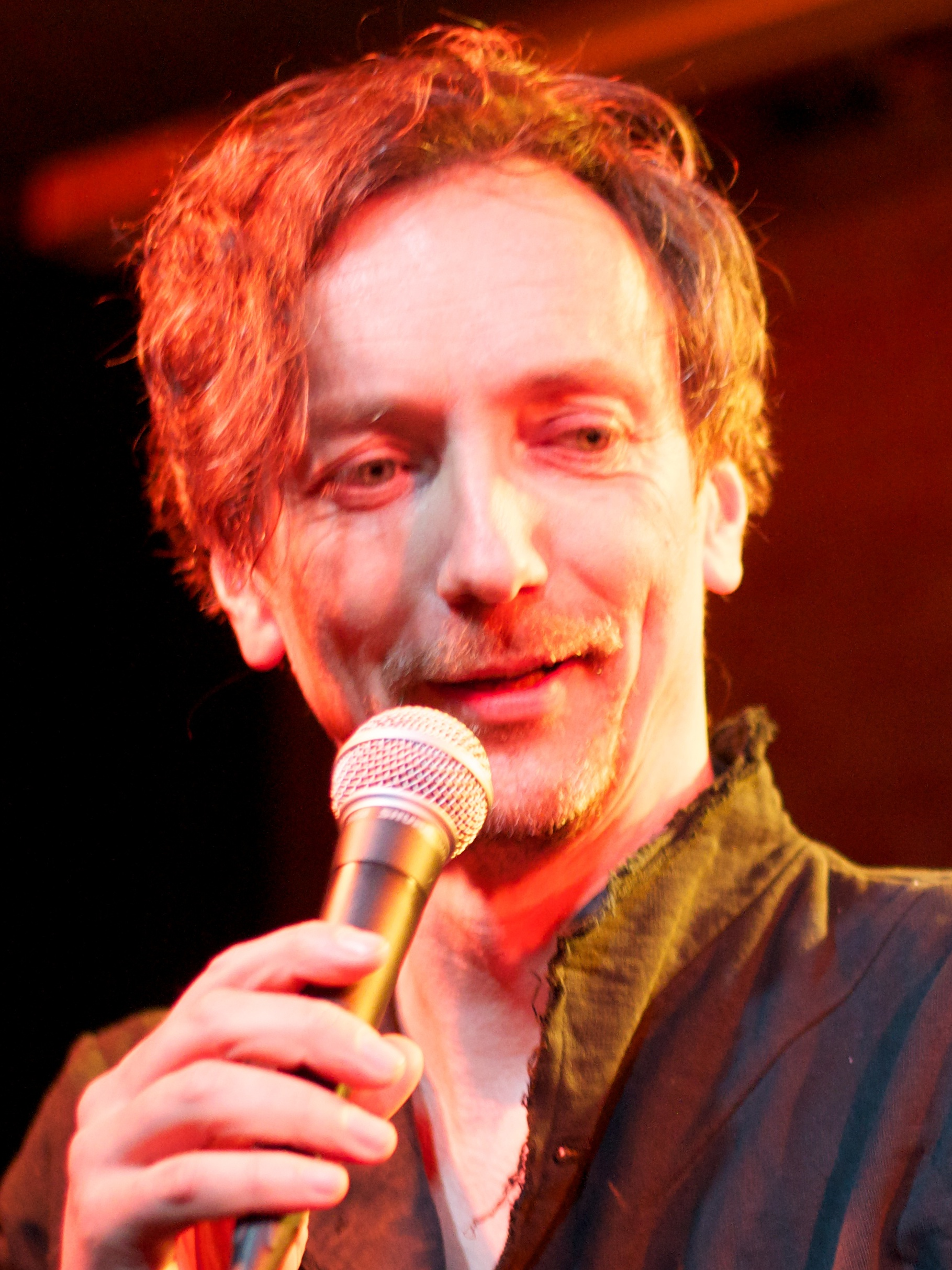
James Friend's cinematography and Volker Bertelmann's score received widespread praise and earned them numerous accolades, including the awards for Best Cinematography and Best Original Score, respectively, at the 95th Academy Awards.

On the review aggregator website Rotten Tomatoes, 90% of 176 critics' reviews are positive, with an average rating of 8.2/10. The website's consensus reads: "Both timely and timeless, All Quiet on the Western Front retains the power of its classic source material by focusing on the futility of war." Metacritic, which uses a weighted average, assigned the film a score of 76 out of 100, based on 37 critics, indicating "generally favorable" reviews.

Ben Kenigsberg, writing for The New York Times, found the film to be less impressive than the 1930 version, but appreciated the pounding soundtrack. He also praised the addition of a parallel plot tracking the armistice, even if it diverged from the first person narrative of the novel. He found the tweaked fate of the characters to be narratively powerful. Jamelle Bouie in The New York Times said the 2022 version missed the essence of the novel, which is not just antiwar, but also portrays the alienation and terrible toll even on those who come home. "Remarque is not as interested in the war and geopolitics as he is in the war as human absurdity made manifest." In a sequence of the 1930 film, omitted from the 2022 film, Paul comes home on leave and can't relate to former teachers and other adults. "You still think it's beautiful and sweet to die for your country, don't you?" says Paul. "The first bombardment taught us better." According to Bouie, "The inclusion of this political subplot and the exclusion of Paul's return home transforms All Quiet on the Western Front from a psychological examination of the soldier's experience and a condemnation of war into a much simpler story of virtuous soldiers and cynical leaders who betrayed them."

Mark Kermode says that, although it is on Netflix, there is an excellent reason to see it in cinemas because it is "visually very, very impressive, overwhelming, and gruelling." "It is harrowing of course ... and it should be." Cultural historian Bethany Wyatt makes a case for its being the "finest First World War film to date". She claims that it "is faithful to the spirit of Remarque's novel". Wyatt says "it is difficult to match the power of the 1930 All Quiet on the Western Front's conclusion," ... "but the 2022 adaptation succeeds in crafting its own elegy for the men who did not return home."

Journalist Martin Schwickert of the RND media group called the film "frighteningly current" in light of the Russian invasion of Ukraine, saying it "made plain what war means for those who have to fight it". Producer Malte Grunert said the film tells the "story of a young man who falls prey to right-wing nationalist propaganda – believing that war is an adventure, and that they are on the right side. It is a timeless story, that we now see played out live in Ukraine."

Filmmaker Kimberly Peirce praised Berger's direction, saying that he "captures the humanity of his narrative by depicting the devastating transformation of our protagonist from a godly beautiful innocent eager-to-fight young soldier to a grunt following every order still unable to stop the cascading loss of his friends, to a man unleashed, echoing the monster he was set to slay." Filmmaker Rob Marshall and actress Dolly de Leon have both cited the film as among their favorites of the 21st century.

Many German critics praised the action sequences but found fault with the film's considerable deviations from the book, which is required reading in many German schools. As Britain's New Statesman summarised, "...in Germany, it is seen as shallow, cynical and 'horny for Oscars'". Hubert Wetzel, writing in Süddeutsche Zeitung, criticized the film's alterations to the book stating that "you have to ask yourself whether director Berger has even read Remarque's novel". He also criticizes that Berger added characters at will, omitted central characters and scenes, and changed the ending so that the title and content no longer had any connection to each other. The film also received negative reviews from Frankfurter Allgemeine Zeitung. Military historian Sönke Neitzel praised the battle scenes as being more historically accurate than the previous adaptations but criticized the film for depicting soldiers being shot to prevent desertion, as only 48 German soldiers were officially executed for all causes during the war.

== Legacy ==
In 2023, Collider ranked it as the "Best Historical Epic of All Time". MovieWeb ranked it at number 7 on its list of "The Best Anti-War Movies Ever Made". In 2025, it was one of the films voted for the "Readers' Choice" edition of The New York Times' list of "The 100 Best Movies of the 21st Century", finishing outside of the top hundred at number 310.

== Accolades ==
Despite the film's positive reception, some German critics and diversity advocates criticized its deviations from the source material, accusing Netflix of producing it as "Oscar bait". The film faced strong competition from Decision to Leave and Everything Everywhere All at Once but managed to outperform them in major categories at the BAFTA and Academy Awards, while guild and critics' awards favored other contenders. Some critics also took issue with the director's alterations and omissions of key elements from the novel, arguing that these changes were made to increase the film's chances during awards season.

Award	Date of ceremony	Category	Recipient(s)	Result	Ref.
National Board of Review	December 8, 2022	Top Five Foreign Language Films	All Quiet on the Western Front	Won	
National Board of Review	December 8, 2022	Best Adapted Screenplay	Edward Berger, Lesley Paterson and Ian Stokell	Won	
European Film Awards	December 10, 2022	Best Makeup and Hairstyling	Heike Merker	Won	
European Film Awards	December 10, 2022	Best Visual Effects	Frank Petzold, Viktor Müller and Markus Frank	Won	
Washington D.C. Area Film Critics Association	December 12, 2022	Best International/Foreign Language Film	All Quiet on the Western Front	Nominated	
St. Louis Gateway Film Critics Association	December 18, 2022	Best International Film	All Quiet on the Western Front	Nominated	
Dallas–Fort Worth Film Critics Association	December 19, 2022	Best Foreign Language Film	All Quiet on the Western Front	4th place	
Alliance of Women Film Journalists	January 5, 2023	Best Screenplay, Adapted	Edward Berger, Lesley Paterson, Ian Stokell	Nominated	
Alliance of Women Film Journalists	January 5, 2023	Best Non-English Language Film	All Quiet on the Western Front	Nominated	
San Diego Film Critics Society	January 6, 2023	Best Director	Edward Berger	Nominated	
San Diego Film Critics Society	January 6, 2023	Best Adapted Screenplay	Edward Berger, Lesley Paterson and Ian Stokell	Won	
San Diego Film Critics Society	January 6, 2023	Best International Film	All Quiet on the Western Front	Won	
San Francisco Bay Area Film Critics Circle	January 9, 2023	Best International Feature Film	All Quiet on the Western Front	Nominated	
Golden Globe Awards	January 10, 2023	Best Motion Picture – Foreign Language	All Quiet on the Western Front	Nominated	
Georgia Film Critics Association	January 13, 2023	Best International Film	All Quiet on the Western Front	Nominated	
Critics' Choice Movie Awards	January 15, 2023	Best Foreign Language Film	All Quiet on the Western Front	Nominated	
Seattle Film Critics Society	January 17, 2023	Best Film Not in the English Language	All Quiet on the Western Front	Nominated	
Online Film Critics Society	January 23, 2023	Best Film Not in the English Language	All Quiet on the Western Front	Nominated	
British Society of Cinematographers	February 11, 2023	Cinematography in a Feature Film	James Friend	Won	
Vancouver Film Critics Circle	February 13, 2023	Best Foreign Language Film	All Quiet on the Western Front	Won	
Houston Film Critics Society	February 18, 2023	Best Foreign Language Feature	All Quiet on the Western Front	Nominated	
Art Directors Guild Awards	February 18, 2023	Excellence in Production Design for a Period Film	Christian M. Goldbeck	Nominated	
British Academy Film Awards	February 19, 2023	Best Film	Malte Grunert	Won	
British Academy Film Awards	February 19, 2023	Best Director	Edward Berger	Won	
British Academy Film Awards	February 19, 2023	Best Actor in a Supporting Role	Albrecht Schuch	Nominated	
British Academy Film Awards	February 19, 2023	Best Adapted Screenplay	Edward Berger, Lesley Paterson, Ian Stokell	Won	
British Academy Film Awards	February 19, 2023	Best Film Not in the English Language	Edward Berger, Malte Grunert	Won	
British Academy Film Awards	February 19, 2023	Best Casting	Simone Bär	Nominated	
British Academy Film Awards	February 19, 2023	Best Cinematography	James Friend	Won	
British Academy Film Awards	February 19, 2023	Best Costume Design	Lisy Christl	Nominated	
British Academy Film Awards	February 19, 2023	Best Editing	Sven Budelmann	Nominated	
British Academy Film Awards	February 19, 2023	Best Make Up & Hair	Heike Merker	Nominated	
British Academy Film Awards	February 19, 2023	Best Original Score	Volker Bertelmann	Won	
British Academy Film Awards	February 19, 2023	Best Production Design	Christian M. Goldbreck, Ernestine Hipper	Nominated	
British Academy Film Awards	February 19, 2023	Best Sound	Lars Ginzsel, Frank Kruse, Viktor Prášil, Markus Stemler	Won	
British Academy Film Awards	February 19, 2023	Best Special Visual Effects	Markus Frank, Kamil Jafar, Viktor Müller, Frank Petzoid	Nominated	
Hollywood Critics Association Awards	February 24, 2023	Best International Film	All Quiet on the Western Front	Nominated	
Golden Reel Awards	February 26, 2023	Outstanding Achievement in Sound Editing – Foreign Language Feature	Frank Kruse, Markus Stemler, Alexander Buck, Benjamin Hörbe, Alexander Buck, Thomas Kalbér, Moritz Hoffmeister, Kuen Il Song, Carsten Richter, Daniel Weis	Won	
Cinema Audio Society Awards	March 4, 2023	Outstanding Achievement in Sound Mixing for a Motion Picture – Live Action	Viktor Prášil, Lars Ginzel, Stefan Korte, Daniel Kresco, Jan Meyerdierks, Hanse Warns	Nominated	
Cinema for Peace Awards	February 24, 2023	The Most Valuable Film of The Year	Edward Berger	Won	
Academy Awards	March 12, 2023	Best Picture	Malte Grunert	Nominated	
Academy Awards	March 12, 2023	Best Adapted Screenplay	Edward Berger, Lesley Paterson and Ian Stokell	Nominated	
Academy Awards	March 12, 2023	Best International Feature Film	Germany	Won	
Academy Awards	March 12, 2023	Best Original Score	Volker Bertelmann	Won	
Academy Awards	March 12, 2023	Best Sound	Viktor Prášil, Frank Kruse, Markus Stemler, Lars Ginzel and Stefan Korte	Nominated	
Academy Awards	March 12, 2023	Best Production Design	Christian M. Goldbeck and Ernestine Hipper	Won	
Academy Awards	March 12, 2023	Best Cinematography	James Friend	Won	
Academy Awards	March 12, 2023	Best Makeup and Hairstyling	Heike Merker and Linda Eisenhamerová	Nominated	
Academy Awards	March 12, 2023	Best Visual Effects	Frank Petzold, Viktor Müller, Markus Frank and Kamil Jafar	Nominated	
German Film Award	May 12, 2023	Best Film	Malte Grunert	Nominated (won Silver award)	
German Film Award	May 12, 2023	Best Director	Edward Berger	Nominated	
German Film Award	May 12, 2023	Best Actor	Felix Kammerer	Won	
German Film Award	May 12, 2023	Best Supporting Actor	Albrecht Schuch	Won	
German Film Award	May 12, 2023	Best Cinematography	James Friend	Won	
German Film Award	May 12, 2023	Best Editing	Sven Budelmann	Nominated	
German Film Award	May 12, 2023	Best Sound Design	Frank Kruse, Markus Stemler, Viktor Prášil, Lars Ginzel, Alexander Buck	Won	
German Film Award	May 12, 2023	Best Score	Volker Bertelmann	Won	
German Film Award	May 12, 2023	Best Set Design	Christian M. Goldbeck	Won	
German Film Award	May 12, 2023	Best Costume Design	Lisy Christl	Nominated	
German Film Award	May 12, 2023	Best Hair and Make-Up	Heike Merker	Won	
German Film Award	May 12, 2023	Best Visual Effects	Frank Petzold, Viktor Müller	Won	
Location Managers Guild Awards	August 25, 2023	Outstanding Locations in a Period Film	Petr Růčka, Marek Řídel, Jan Ondrovčák	Won	

== See also ==
- List of submissions to the 95th Academy Awards for Best International Feature Film
- List of German submissions for the Academy Award for Best International Feature Film
