= Rebellion (2021 film) =

- Directed by: Maia Kenworthy; Elena Sánchez Bellot
- Produced by: Maia Kenworthy; Elena Sánchez Bellot; Kat Mansoor; Kevin Macdonald
- Edited by: Michael Nollet
- Music by: Wayne Roberts
- Production company: Halcyon Pictures
- Distributed by: Tull Stories (UK); Hope Runs High (US)
- Release dates: November 2021 (IDFA); 18 March 2022 (UK)
- Running time: 82 minutes
- Country: United Kingdom
- Language: English

Rebellion is a 2021 British documentary film directed by Maia Kenworthy & Elena Sánchez Bellot. It is the first feature-length documentary to follow the founders of the Extinction Rebellion movement. It was nominated for the 2023 BAFTA Award for Outstanding Debut by a British Writer, Director or Producer.

== Production ==
The film was produced by Kat Mansoor with production beginning in 2019. It follows the journey of the Extinction Rebellion co-founders as well as Farhana Yamin, a lawyer and key figure in negotiating the Paris Climate Agreement, as she decides to break the law for the first time in her life. Academy Award winning documentarian Kevin Macdonald served as executive producer. This is the first feature length work from directing duo Maia Kenworthy and Elena Sánchez Bellot.

== Release ==
The film premiered at the 2021 International Documentary Festival Amsterdam. It later showed on March 10, 2022, at the Glasgow Film Festival before being released in UK theatres by Tull Stories. Subsequently, it was announced by Deadline that the film had been acquired for American theatrical release by Hope Runs High. Early in 2023 the film's directors were nominated for the BAFTA Award for Outstanding Debut by a British Writer, Director or Producer.

== Reception ==
The film was met with a largely positive response. The Guardian felt that "the film-makers chronicle the inner tensions at XR with fairness and sensitivity – this is a documentary that you feel you can trust." While Time Out London said "The real message [is not that the] planet is still fucked. It’s that this government [and the] police see these decent people as such a threat that they want to change the law to make what they do illegal. And if that doesn’t bother you, I doubt rising sea levels do."
