= Malte Grunert =

German film producer

Malte Grunert (born in 1967) is a German film producer. In 2023, he was nominated for the Academy Award for Best Picture and the BAFTA Award for Best Film as the producer of the movie All Quiet on the Western Front (2022), winning the latter in February 2023.
