= Aymenn Jawad Al-Tamimi =

British analyst on Syria and Iraq (born 1992)

- Born: 1992 (age 33–34)
- Education: Brasenose College, University of Oxford

Aymenn Jawad Al-Tamimi (Arabic: أيمن جواد التميمي, romanized: ʾAyman Jawād at-Tamīmī; born 1992) is a British-Iraqi researcher and analyst who specialises in the Syrian Civil War, War in Iraq (2013–2017) and the Islamic State of Iraq and the Levant (commonly known as ISIL or ISIS). He has been consulted as an expert by major media outlets including The New York Times, The Wall Street Journal, The Washington Post, and others. He authored a major report published by the New York Times in partnership with George Washington University in their 2020 series, "The ISIS report". He has faced criticism over his alleged sympathies towards ISIL in his work, as well as his conduct and alleged close relationships with ISIL fighters.

== Education ==
Aymenn Jawad Al-Tamimi studied Classics and Oriental studies at Brasenose College, University of Oxford. He earned his degree there. In March 2020 he was a doctoral candidate at Swansea University and he successfully defended his PhD thesis in January 2024.

== Early career ==
In an otherwise scathing 2014 Business Insider article, Armin Rosen described then 21-year-old Aymenn Jawad Al-Tamimi as one of "the fastest rising stars in his field — his online connections and self-presentation to jihadists he was attempting to mine for information." Rosen wrote that Aymenn Jawad Al-Tamimi who was then a "recent graduate of Oxford University" had already "become a widely-cited public authority on jihadist groups in Iraq and Syria while still completing his undergraduate studies" at Brasenose College, University of Oxford. The Insider article said that by 2014, Al-Tamimi had been "generally considered a leading public authority on jihadist groups in Iraq and Syria."

== Middle East expert ==
His work has focused on "militant groups of all affiliations in Iraq and Syria, with particular interest in those of jihadist orientation". His work is regularly quoted in media including the Associated Press.

He is listed as an expert by the Middle East Institute (MEI) and has been a guest contributor. According to the MEI, he has been "cited in the New York Times, the Wall Street Journal, The Times (London), the Washington Post, and other publications."

In a November 14, 2019 New York Times article, Al-Tamimi, was described as an "independent Syria researcher" who was consulted by the Times as an expert on ISIS.

The New York Times, Washington Post, and Associated Press have published Al-Tamimi's "insights on the Islamic State, Iraq, and Syria", according to a March 2020 report by the Washington Institute for Near East Policy (WINEP or TWI).

=== UK House of Commons Defence Committee ===
He has appeared before the UK House of Commons Defence Committee to advise on the Islamic State and Iraq. He has been described as "one of the fastest rising stars in his field" and "a widely-cited public authority on jihadist groups in Iraq and Syria."

== Major stories ==
His report entitled "The Islamic State's Real Estate Department: Documents and Analysis" was published by The New York Times and George Washington University as part of the University's Program on Extremism. The Times and the University had joined in an "exclusive partnership" to "digitize, translate, analyze, and publish" over 15,000 files, now known as "The ISIS Files"—which had been obtained by the investigative journalist Rukmini Callimachi and her "Iraqi colleagues during embeds with the Iraqi army". The Time and the university had announced their intention to make the ISIS files public in 2018 and published them online in June 2020.

The VOA news published an article saying that "prominent Islamic scholar," Tariq Ramadan, had been "charged with rape in France". Al-Tamimi published a friend's firsthand account of Ramadan's predatory behavior on his website—an account which was sourced in the VOA article.

An in-depth 30 December 2015 report in the Washington Post, which included an interview with Al-Tamimi, presented extensive evidence that documents that were leaked and purported to prove that the Islamic State was weakening were fake. In the article, Al-Tamimi, whose research on the Islamic State is considerable, said that suggestions that he write a book were premature. "Just as the best histories of Nazi Germany have been written well after the Second World War with archives of documents made available to researchers, so I apply the same reasoning to analyzing the Islamic State. As researchers we need to be aware of the limits of our capabilities in obtaining information."

His reports on the Khalid ibn al-Walid Army in Syria in 2016 and 2017 were published by the Rubin Center.

A March 2020 report entitled "Honored, Not Contained: The Future of Iraq's Popular Mobilization Forces", which he co-authored with Michael Knights and Hamdi Malik, was published by the Washington Institute for Near East Policy (WINEP or TWI).

== Unethical methods to track jihadists (2013–2014) ==
Armin Rosen, who was then Business Insider's senior writer for defense and the military, wrote a scathing article that the "young terrorism analyst's" career had come "apart in public". Rosen raised concerns that Al-Tamimi had provided rhetorical support to ISIS supporters and members.

Aymenn Jawad Al-Tamimi responded to the accusations in his personal blog under his own name "Aymenn Jawad Al-Tamimi", which is self-described as Pundicity: Informed Opinion and Review. Aymenn Jawad Al-Tamimi admitted in a 22 July 2014 blog post entitled, Reflections on Methods" that, "[While] this indeed garnered some valuable information (eg it helped [him] first identify Moroccan ex-Gitmo detainee Muhammad Mizouz and his presence in Syria), it was also unethical, pure and simple."

He defended his actions by saying that for over the year that he was engaged in these activities, he had been "intensely tracking the jihadist group the Islamic State (formerly ISIS)" on both "Twitter and in [his] analytical articles for over a year. He said that he did so to "gain the confidence of these circles" by "feign[ing] sympathy for their views." He wrote that he had "adopted a 'jihadi persona' in communications with them".

=== Background ===
On 14 July 2014, Jonathan Krohn and Al-Tamimi co-authored an article which had attempted to disprove evidence presented by the American journalist Michael Weiss in his 23 June 2014 Foreign Policy article, which claimed that Iran was aiding ISIS. Weiss wrote that while "American talking heads" said that Iran was the "key to defeating ISIS", "those in the know" said "the two "enemies" were "actually secret allies". Weiss' 2014 claim appears to be erroneous according to a 4 January 2019 New York Times article. (Note: A 4 January 2020 New York Times article said "The Iraqi government established after the United States invasion in 2003 has long struggled to balance its dependence on Washington and the West against its close ties to its neighbor Iran. The Iraqi government in Baghdad relied heavily on those Iranian-backed militias in the fight against ISIS.")

This differing of opinions of the three analyst's provided the backdrop for Rosen's 14 July 2014 Insider article.

=== Responses to revelations about the unethical methods Al-Tamimi had used in 2013–2014 ===
Weiss provided evidence of a conversation in which Al-Tamimi told an ISIS supporter that it was "best not openly tweeting" support for the Islamic State. Daveed Gartenstein-Ross called the exchange "pretty disturbing" while Jonathan Krohn, though "deny[ing], in the most categorical terms possible, that Tamimi is a terrorism supporter" said "had I known this I would not have published anything with him in the first place." According to University of Maryland professor Phillip Smyth, "One crosses the line when one starts to, under their real name and in full view of the general public, kind of act like a jihadi and say that they are a jihadi."

Rosen included a list of Al-Tamimi's questionable online communications with ISIS members as part of "self-presentation to jihadists he was attempting to mine for information" including the Indian Islamic State supporter Mehdi Masroor Biswas (known online as @ShamiWitness), currently imprisoned in his home country, whom Al-Tamimi called 'brother' and 'friend'. Rosen listed a Shami witness Biswas article that Al-Tamimi had posted on his personal blog "Aymenn Jawad Al-Tamimi" described as Pundicity: Informed Opinion and Review. He claimed to know the British Islamic State fighter Raphael Hostey ('Abu Qaqa') personally. Among other posts Al-Tamimi made on Twitter were ones claiming "one day even the Kaaba in Mecca will be covered with the ISIS banner" and "Dawla Islamiya (Islamic State) will take over the whole world".

Rosen reported that academics and researchers, including Aaron Zelin, Phillip Smyth, Daveed Gartenstein-Ross and Eliot Higgins condemned Al-Tamimi's actions. "He's presenting two different sides of himself to different audiences," Berger told Business Insider. "He's presenting himself to us as part of this analyst community, and he's presenting himself to ISIS sources as someone who is supportive of their political goals. Both of those things really can't be true. So it creates a problem."

Rosen cited Aaron Zelin, who had blacklisted Al-Tamimi and removed all his work from his website Jihadology, as saying that Tamimi's analysis had become "more and more just pushing that narrative of the groups [ISIS] themselves."

In response to Rosen's article, Bellingcat immediately removed an article by Al-Tamimi in which he defended the Islamic State of Iraq and the Levant, claiming it had no relation to al-Qaeda and that the rise of IS was a legitimate reaction to the "marginalization of Sunnis" and the 2013 Hawija clashes. While Al-Tamimi was banned from any further contribution to the site, Bellingcat continued to cite Al-Tamimi as an expert in later articles. In his 2016 Bellingcat report, investigative journalist, Christiaan Triebert cited Aymenn Jawad Al-Tamimi, a "fellow at the Middle East Forum," to clarify any confusion about the management of water infrastructure in Raqqa. Aymenn Jawad al-Tamimi, pointed out that there was no evidence that the Nusra fighters managed Raqqa's water affairs. He said that "civilian services were largely the responsibility of the local council while Nusra focused on their war efforts".

Al-Tamimi responded to Rosen's accusations saying that, "I think there’s something to be said that I did try to ingratiate myself in these circles to get information, I agree that that was unethical.”
