= Christo Grozev =

Bulgarian investigative journalist (born 1969)

- Христо Грозев
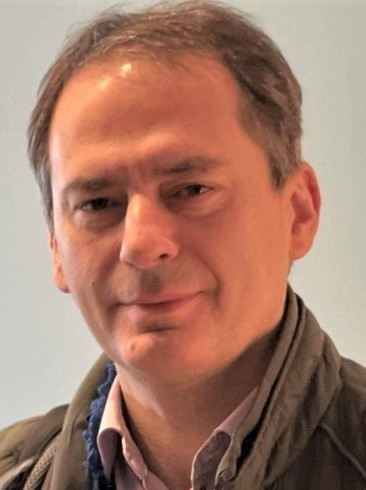
- Grozev in 2021
- Born: 20 May 1969 (age 57); Plovdiv, Bulgaria
- Education: American University in Bulgaria (BA); Imadec Executive Education (MBA, MLE, LLM)
- Occupations: Journalist; author
- Employers: The Insider; Der Spiegel

Christo Grozev (Bulgarian: Христо Грозев, romanised: Hristo Grozev; born 20 May 1969) is a Bulgarian investigative journalist and author, whose coverage focuses on Russian intelligence operations. He is the head of investigations with The Insider, and former lead Russia investigator with Bellingcat. He also writes for Der Spiegel. His investigations into the identity of the suspects involved in the 2018 poisoning of Sergei and Yulia Skripal earned him and his team the European Press Prize for Investigative Journalism, and the enmity of the Russian state.

== Early life ==
Grozev was born in Plovdiv on 20 May 1969. Between 1984 and 1988, he attended Plovdiv's English Language High School. In 1995, he graduated from the American University in Bulgaria with a Bachelor of Arts degree in "Mass Communication and Media Studies". He later received an Executive MBA, a Master of Law and Economics, and a Master of Laws from Imadec Executive Education, specialising in Finance, Law, Economics, and International Law. Grozev also speaks and writes in Russian fluently.

== Career ==
=== Radio ===
Grozev started to work as a journalist for a newspaper when he was 17; later on he worked as a radio reporter during the socialist period in Bulgaria. Since 1988 he has been a radio reporter in Plovdiv. In 1991 he was one of the founders and CEO of Bulgaria's first commercial radio station – Aura – which was affiliated with the American University in Bulgaria. In 1994 he was hired by the American company Metromedia to work with its Russian assets. He launched Radio Nika in Sochi, Channel Melodia and Eldoradio in Saint Petersburg, and dozens of radio stations in the Baltic countries, Finland, Bulgaria, and Hungary. He was appointed Metromedia's Regional Director and Vice President of Radio in 1997.

In 2000, Grozev became CEO of the Radio Division of Metromedia, supervising the operations and growth of over 30 radio stations in 11 countries in Central and Eastern Europe, Northern Europe, Russia, and the CIS. When Metromedia left the radio business in 2003, Grozev bought Russian radio (RBMH Broadcast Media Holdings) assets from it; in 2006, he sold them to the French company Lagardère Group. Grozev also served a director of the Irish company Communicorp, which acquired its other broadcasting assets from Metromedia (2005–2007). He supervised the integration of Metromedia's European radio group into Communicorp, and was in charge of the company's further expansion in existing and new markets, such as Ukraine and Latvia.

After 2006, Grozev acted as an investor in various media assets, mainly in the Netherlands and Bulgaria. In 2006, his company RadioCorp B.V. received a broadcasting license in the Netherlands to create a radio station focusing on national music. Radiocorp operates two national radio stations (100% NL and Radio 10), and one national music TV station (100% NL TV). Since 2016, Grozev is a Supervisory Board Member at the Dutch Talpa Radio Holding. Radio NewCo operates four of the leading commercial national radio stations in the Netherlands: Radio 538, Sky Radio, Radio 10, and Radio Veronica. The group is also a majority shareholder in One Media Sales, the Netherlands' leading radio sales house.

Grozev also owns a news television channel and several newspapers in Bulgaria. In 2007, he became a co-founder and partner at Altelys Investments, a platform focusing primarily on media and telecoms investments in Eastern and Central Europe. Altelys currently operates a national radio station in Ukraine, owns stake in print media in Bulgaria, and owns a real estate services business based in Austria.

=== Bellingcat ===
Grozev joined Bellingcat in 2015 as an investigative reporter. Grozev is known for using open-source, social media, and other available data for investigations. He has authored investigations identifying, among others, two senior Russian officers linked to the downing of Malaysia Airlines Flight 17 in 2014, GRU officers involved with the 2016 Montenegrin coup plot, the three suspects of the poisoning of Sergei and Yulia Skripal in 2018 and the poisoning of Alexei Navalny in 2020.

In 2019, Grozev and his team won the European Press Prize Investigative Reporting Award for "Unmasking the Salisbury Poisoning Suspects: A Four-Part Investigation", in which they identified the perpetrators of the poisoning of Sergei and Yulia Skripal.

=== Visual media ===
==== Navalny ====
Grozev was featured heavily in the 2022 documentary Navalny, which covered the title figure's poisoning. Navalny won the BAFTA Award for Best Documentary at the 76th British Academy Film Awards, although Grozev's invitation to the awards ceremony was rescinded days before it was due to take place, following an assessment that he was a "security risk." The film's creators paid tribute to Grozev upon collecting the award. The film went on to win the Best Documentary Award at the 95th Academy Awards, which Grozev appeared on stage to accept the award alongside Director Daniel Roher and Yulia Navalnaya.

==== YouTube Channel ====
Since November 2024, Grozev has hosted a YouTube channel titled The Christo Files, in which he discusses aspects of his work, which he characterises as “data-driven investigative journalism.”

== Russian wanted list and target ==
On 26 December 2022 the Ministry of Internal Affairs of Russia announced that Grozev was on its "wanted" list without disclosing the reason. According to Russian state-owned domestic news agency RIA Novosti, a criminal case was opened against Grozev for "spreading fakes". On 21 April 2023 Moscow ordered his arrest in absentia. RIA cited a law enforcement source as saying Grozev was accused of facilitating the escape of Roman Dobrokhotov, the editor of a Russian news outlet The Insider, who left Russia in 2021.

According to British investigators, Grozev was shadowed by a group of agents on behalf of Russia in several countries, including Austria, Montenegro, and Spain. The coordinator of the ring was the Austrian criminal Jan Marsalek, who went into hiding in Russia. The agents, who came from Bulgaria, are also said to have broken into his apartment, stolen one of his computers and spied on his life in Vienna, where he lived for a time. The mission title was “Operation Vienna”. In 2025, several members of the group stood trial in Britain for espionage.

== Personal life ==
In the 1990s, Grozev married Stefka Grozeva.

== Awards ==
- 2019 — The European Press Prize Investigative Reporting Award
- 2021 — The Nannen Prize by Gruner + Jahr for Investigation
- 2022 — The ICFJ Innovation in International Reporting Award
