= HNLMS Cornelis Drebbel =

HNLMS Cornelis Drebbel (Dutch: Hr.Ms. or Zr.Ms. Cornelis Drebbel) may refer to the following ships of the Royal Netherlands Navy that have been named after Cornelis Drebbel:

- HNLMS Cornelis Drebbel (1915), an accommodation ship that was in service between 1915 and 1971
- HNLMS Cornelis Drebbel (A886), an accommodation ship that entered service in 1971
