= Tegelspreuken =

Decorative Dutch tiles with aphorisms

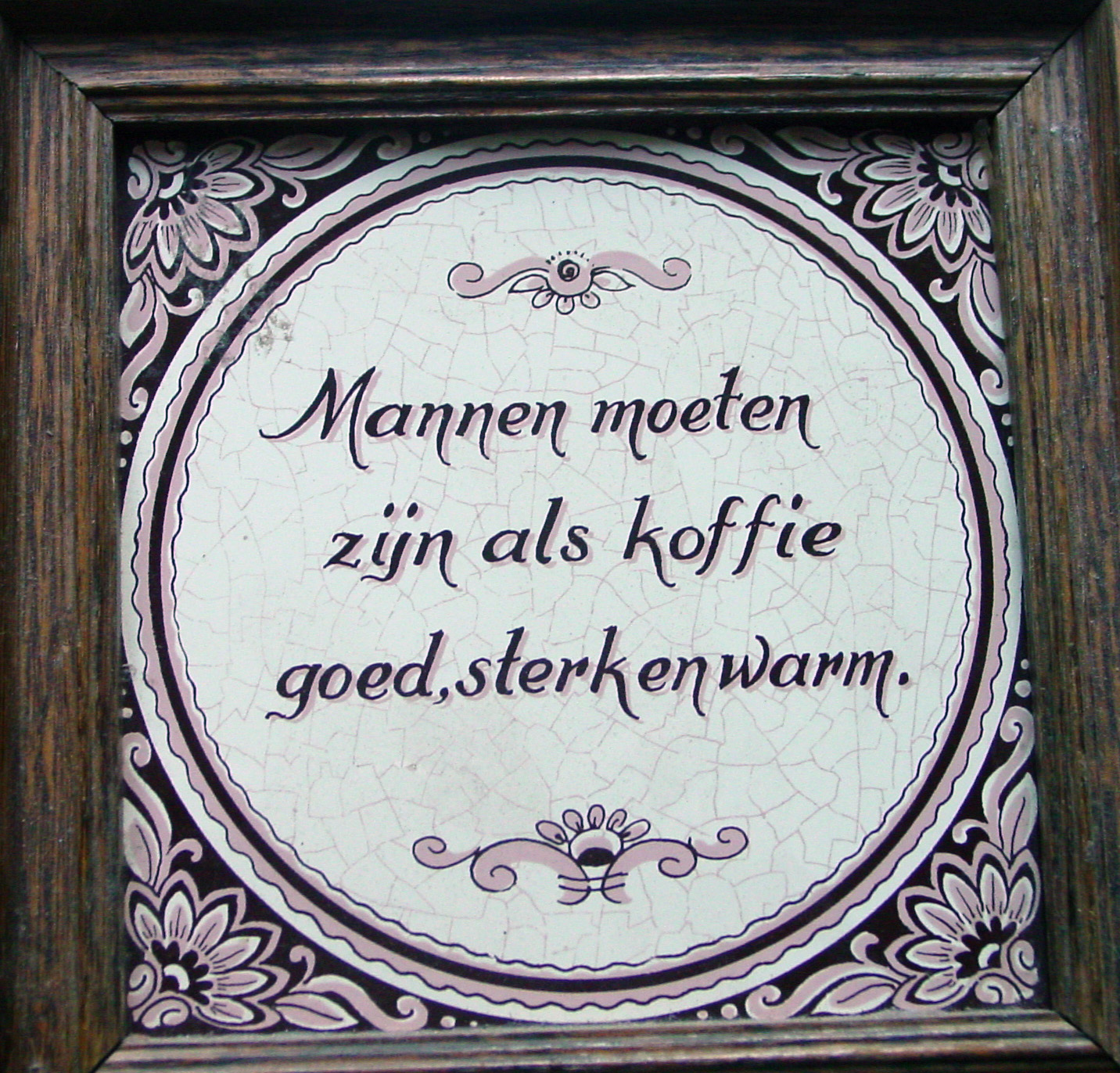
A tegeltjeswijsheid (tile saying): "Men should be like coffee, good, strong and warm."

In the Netherlands, tegelspreuken are sayings such as proverbs or aphorisms (Dutch: tegeltjeswijsheid, pl. tegeltjeswijsheden) written on tiles, often in blue-and-white Delftware style, used as decorative wall-hangings. The tiles themselves are known as spreuktegels (saying tiles).

The first known Dutch tile with an aphorism was a floor tile from the mid-16th century. However, the tradition of hanging blue and white tiles with sayings on the wall did not arise until the 20th century. Designer Arie Kortenhoff created many popular 20th-century spreuktegels. Though the tradition was fading at one point, spreuktegels have recently enjoyed a kitsch revival. Today, spreuktegels are frequently sold in gift shops and souvenir shops. A 2009 exhibition at the Dutch Tile Museum in Otterlo explored the tradition of these tiles. In August 2017, 100% NL sponsored the first National Tegelspreuken Day (tile sayings day) in Volendam.

The sayings inscribed on spreuktegels are called 'tegeltjeswijsheid' (Dutch for tile wisdom). The term tegeltjeswijsheid is also used more generally to describe clichéd sayings or aphorisms not inscribed on tiles. In 2016, Plus Magazine ran a contest to identify the best tegeltjeswijsheid.
