= 100% NL =

Radio station in Bussum, Netherlands

Coordinates: 52°17′10″N 5°11′42″E

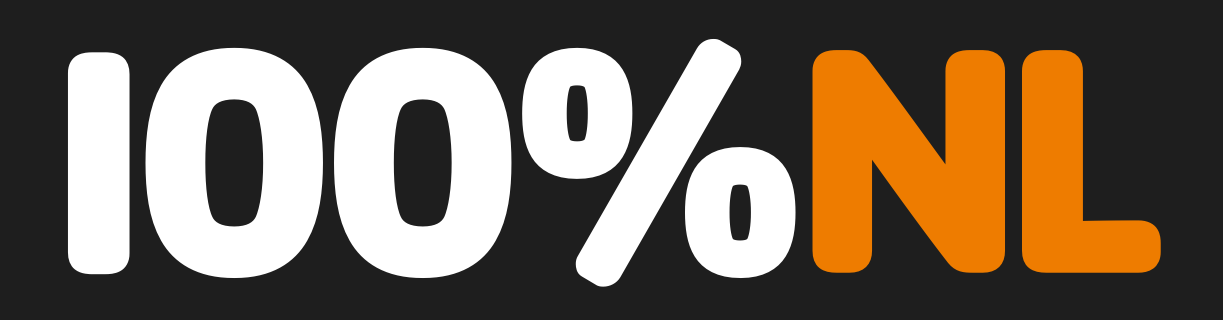
- Naarden; Netherlands
- Broadcast area: Netherlands
- Frequencies: FM: 87.8 MHz (Arnhem); 88.2 MHz (Ugchelen); 88.3 MHz (Wieringerwerf); 89.0 MHz (Lochem); 89.5 MHz (Utrecht); 89.5 MHz (Alkmaar); 89.6 MHz (Amsterdam); 90.0 MHz (Loon op Zand); 90.0 MHz (Vlissingen); 90.2 MHz (Roosendaal); 90.5 MHz (Goes); 91.9 MHz (Venlo); 92.0 MHz (Velsen-Zuid); 92.1 MHz (Valkenburg); 93.8 MHz (Haarlem); 94.2 MHz (Hoogersmilde); 94.9 MHz (Mierlo); 95.0 MHz (Nijmegen); 95.0 MHz (Amersfoort); 97.6 MHz (Zwolle); 99.1 MHz (Enschede); 99.1 MHz (Tjerkgaast); 99.1 MHz (Kiel-Windeweer); 104.4 MHz (Hilversum); 104.6 MHz (Rotterdam); DAB+: VHF channel 11C (220,352 MHz)

Programming
- Format: Dutch music (CHR, hot AC, classic hits, urban and sometimes also Levenslied) (1970s-today)

Ownership
- Owner: Mediahuis Nederland
- Sister stations: SLAM! Radio Veronica; Sublime

History
- First air date: 8 July 2006

Links
- Webcast: 100% NL Webstream; 100% NL Non-Stop; 100% NL Feest; 100% NL Liefde; Playlist
- Website: www.100p.nl

100% NL (Dutch: 100 procent NL) is a Dutch commercial radio station which broadcasts nationwide on FM since 8 July 2006. 100% NL runs primarily Dutch products.

100% NL logo used from October 27, 2008, to August 31, 2015.

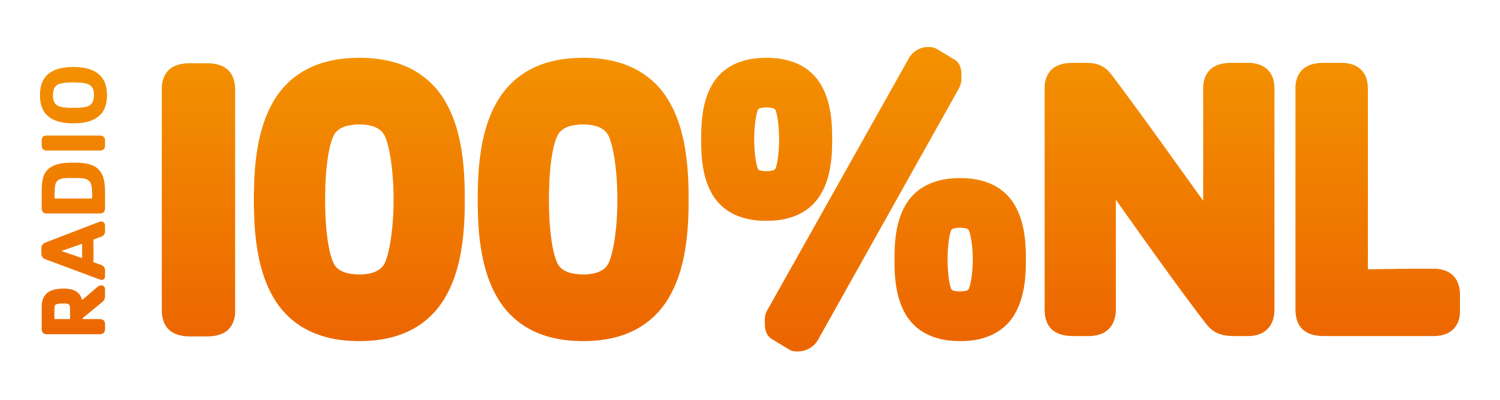
100% NL logo used from August 31, 2015, to January 14, 2019

== Music ==
During the first three years of the station, it profiled itself as a pop, rock and urban station aimed at a young audience. Due to a lack of success, the station dropped the format in mid-2008 and many presenters were dismissed. The station started focusing on nederpop and "soft" music, and would add "women-friendly" programs, with presenters such as Daphne Deckers, Myrna Goossen, Tanja Jess, and Elsemiek Hillen.

Today, 100% NL runs the music of the Netherlands. Core artists include Jan Smit, Nick & Simon, 3JS, Ilse Delange, Doe Maar, Bløf, Acda en De Munnik, Paul de Leeuw, Marco Borsato, Anouk, and Guus Meeuwis. In addition, listeners can hear artists like Armin van Buuren, Mr. Probz, Kensington, Rondé and others. The station also includes music from other countries; listeners can hear hits from artists such as Robbie Williams, Phil Collins, and UB40.

== Legal battle ==
The emergence of 100% NL characterized by numerous lawsuits. In 2003, the Dutch radio frequencies were re-distributed based on zero base, a redistribution of the AM and FM frequencies with the aim to offer more commercial radio stations access to the Dutch airwaves. This distribution is a comparative test with auction element.

European companies could apply for these frequencies and had to submit a business plan for the desired frequency. A number of national frequency packages (lots) were made available by the government without any conditions, called "plots". The "special stipulations plots" are packages which have conditions were set. For this special stipulations except plots had a business plan also be handed a program plan.

The plans submitted were compared by an independent committee (comparative test). If a package no special stipulations of the applications are head and shoulders above the rest would stabbing, the applicant for the financial bid would be the deciding factor (the auction element).

One of these plots was designated by the government for music of Dutch and European soil, the so-called plot A9. RTL Netherlands offered 35% Dutch language productions, while Media Sales 70% boosted in that category. The review committee found that this difference "not significant" was, after the financial bid of 23 million euros of RTL against the 8,000 euros of the Finnish Media Sales was decisive and RTL FM came on the air.

Media Sales, led by (then) ANP newsreader Herbert Fisher, then went to court. After two years of proceedings on the merits of the court ruled The Hague Finnish Media Sales in the same. Eventually 100% NL on 8 July 2006 beginning with the first broadcast.

In 2009 100% NL was nominated for a Marconi Award.

== First broadcast ==
On the night of 7 to 8 July 2006, the start of the program began with a broadcast from the boiler house at the Westergasfabriek Terrain in Amsterdam. DJs Eline la Croix and Casper Meijer presented the live show with urban artists like K-Liber 4 Life, The Opposites, and Ninthe. The first song played was "The Right Side Won" by What Fun! and was preceded by a speech by 100% NL spokesman Herbert Visser.

== Sister stations ==
100% NL TV is a television channel which started in 2013 as a TV channel of 100% NL. In addition, the station has a number of digital channels that link to 100% NL, like 100% NL Dance, 100% NL Feest, and 100% NL Liefde.
