= European Press Prize =

Journalism prize

European Press Prize Foundation
- Formation: 2012
- Headquarters: Amsterdam, The Netherlands
- Board: Yoeri Albrecht, Jens Bruun, Lars Munch, Marie Němcová, Nienke Venema
- Website: https://www.europeanpressprize.com/

The European Press Prize is a non-profit foundation based in the Netherlands. It runs a programme of journalism awards of the same name for journalists from 46 countries, the Council of Europe, Belarus and Russia. As part of the programme, a jury awards prizes in five categories each year. These are Distinguished Reporting, Innovation, Investigative Reporting, Migration Journalism, and Public Discourse. In addition, the jury also awards a special prize for outstanding journalism that transcends categories and disciplines.

== History ==
The European Press Prize was founded in 2012 by seven European media foundations: The Guardian Foundation, Thomson Reuters Foundation, Jyllands-Posten Foundation, Politiken Foundation, Media Development Investment Fund, Vereniging Veronica and Stichting Democratie en Media. In 2015, The Irish Times Trust Limited joined as a member organisation, and Agora SA followed two years later. In 2020, the philanthropic organisation Luminate became a member.

The first ceremony was at De Balie in Amsterdam in 2013, the 2014 awards were given at the Reuters headquarters in London, and in 2015 the European Press Prize visited the JP/Politiken headquarters in Copenhagen. The 2016 awards were presented in Prague with the help of the Forum2000 team. For the fifth anniversary in 2017, the ceremony was held in founding place De Balie in Amsterdam again. In 2018 it took place in Budapest at the Open Archives Society. In 2019 the prizes were awarded in Warsaw at the headquarters of Gazeta Wyborcza. As the COVID-19 pandemic prohibited a live ceremony, the winners of the 2020 and the 2021 edition were announced online.

The organisation is based in Amsterdam.

== Jury ==
Each year, a preparatory committee selects a shortlist, which is published on the European Press Prize website. A panel of judges then selects the winners of the five categories from this list. The jury also decides who will receive the special prize. The winners are usually announced at the Awards Ceremony in May or June.

Currently, the panel of judges is composed of:

- (chair) Alan Rusbridger, former editor-in-chief of The Guardian
- Alexandra Föderl-Schmid, deputy editor of the Süddeutsche Zeitung
- Can Dündar, Turkish journalist, documentary filmmaker and book author
- Sheila Sitalsing, freelance columnist for De Volkskrant
- Clara Jiménez Cruz, co-founder and CEO of Maldita.es, a Spanish foundation fighting disinformation

From 2013 until 2020:

- (chair) Sir Harold Evans, editor-at-large of Thomson Reuters and the former editor of the Sunday Times
- Jørgen Ejbol, chairman of the Jyllands-Posten Foundation

== Awards ==
The European Press Prize is given in five categories. A sixth special award chosen by the jury is optional. Each prize is worth €10,000.

=== Investigative Reporting Award ===
This award is given for "discovering and revealing facts, exposing hidden news to the public".

Year	Award Winner	Publication
2026	Michael O'Farrell: "The Brother D conspiracy – Exposing an international child abuse cover-up that left children in Africa exposed to a predator for decades"	The Irish Mail on Sunday, Ireland
2024	Sara Manisera, Daniela Sala:"Iraq Without Water: The Cost of Oil to Italy"	Irpi Media, Italy
2023	Alexander Nabert, Christina Brause, Bryan Bender, Nick Robyns-Early: "Death Weapons: Inside a Teenage Terrorist Network"	Welt am Sonntag, Germany
2022	Paavo Teittinen, Klaus Welp (pictures): "The investigation is closed"	Helsingin Sanomat, Finland
2021	Roman Anin, Alesya Marohovskaya, Irina Dolinina, Dmitry Velikovsky, Roman Shleynov, Sonya Savina, Olesya Shmagun and Denis Dmitriev: "Kirill and Katya: Love, offshores, and administrative resources. How marrying Putin's daughter gave Kirill Shamalov a world of opportunity"	IStories, Russia
2020	Annemarte Moland, Even Kjølleberg and Ruben Solvang: "Trigger Warning"	NRK, Norway
2019	Christo Grozev, Roman Dobrokhotov: "Unmasking the Salisbury Poisoning Suspects: A Four-Part Investigation"	Bellingcat, United Kingdom
2018	Stéphane Foucart and Stéphane Horel: "Monsanto Papers"	Le Monde, France
2017	Series of articles on corruption and organized crime	Center for Investigative Journalism of Serbia, Serbia
2016	Marion Quillard: "Those Who have been Raped raise your hand"	Revue XXI, France
2015	Ander Izagirre: "How to produce dead guerillas"	El País, Spain
2014	Steve Stecklow, Babak Dehghanpisheh and Yeganeh Torbati: "The Assets of the Ayatollah"	Reuters, UK

=== Distinguished Reporting Award ===
This award honors "exceptional reporting, telling a story in the best possible way". Until 2017, the category was called Distinguished Writing Award. In 2018 the category was renamed Distinguished Reporting Award.

Year	Award Winner	Publication
2026	Maud Effting, Willem Feenstra: "What the wounds are telling us"	De Volkskrant, Netherlands
2025	Jessica Bateman: "Did Something Happen to Mom When She Was Young?"	Politico, United States
2024	Léa Polverini, Robin Tutenges: "Kazakhstan-Xinjiang, the Border of Tears"	Slate.fr, France
2023	Johannes Böhme: "The travelling tribunal"	Die Zeit, Germany
2022	Bastian Berbner, John Goetz: "What Guantánamo made of them"	Die Zeit, Germany
2021	Janusz Schwertner: "Love in the time of plague"	Onet, Poland
2020	Isobel Cockerell: "The Uyghur women fighting China’s surveillance state"	Coda Story, Georgia
2019	Katrin Kuntz, Marian Blasberg and Christoph Scheuermann: "Fifty-Six Days of Separation"	Der Spiegel, Germany
2018	Michael Obert: "The human catcher"	Süddeutsche Zeitung Magazin, Germany
2017	Dialika Neufeld: "Step-uncle Sam"	Der Spiegel, Germany
2016	Justyna Kopińska: "The Fear-Sick Ward"	Duzy Format (Gazeta Wyborcza), Poland
2015	Elena Kostyuchenko: "Your husband voluntarily went under fire"	Novaya Gazeta, Russia
2014	Sergey Khazov: "The Man in Orange", "Vietnam Town" and "Forbidden Islam"	The New Times magazine, Russia

=== Public Discourse Award ===
Until 2017, the Commentator Award was given for quality commentary and opinionated journalism. Since 2018, the Opinion Award is given for best commentator or remarkable interpretation.

Year	Award Winner	Publication
2026	Kerstin Kohlenberg: "Not again!"	Die Zeit, Germany
2025	Katarzyna Boni: "Mothers at the End of the World"	Książki, Poland
2024	Nataša Markovič:"We Have Betrayed a Generation"	Preiskovalno.si, Media 24, Slovenia
2023	Alla Konstantinova: "'She lost consciousness as it was happening and she’s actually grateful she did.'" What we know about the rapes perpetrated in Ukraine by Russian soldiers	Mediazona, Russia
2022	Peter Pomerantsev: "Memory in the age of impunity"	Coda Story, Georgia
2021	Iván Zsolt Nagy: "When Trianon Hurts Differently"	HVG.hu, Hungary
2020	Beata Balogová, "How We Stopped Being Comrades"	SME, Slovakia
2019	Madeleine Schwartz: "The end of Atlanticism: had Trump killed the ideology that won the cold war?"	The Guardian, United Kingdom
2018	Dragan Bursać: "The third shooting of the boy Petar from Konjic"	Al Jazeera Balkans, Bosnia and Herzegovina
2017	Fintan O'Toole for his Brexit columns	The Observer and The Guardian, United Kingdom
2017	Gideon Rachman for his comments	Financial Times, United Kingdom
2015	Nick Cohen: "The Cowardice of Nigel Farage"	The Observer, United Kingdom
2014	Boris Dežulović: "Vukovar: a Life-Size Monument to the Dead City"	Globus, Croatia
2013	Nikos Chrysoloras: "Greece must remain in the Eurozone"	Kathimerini, Greece

=== Innovation Award ===
This category awards journalists for their inventive or groundbreaking way of storytelling.

Year	Award Winner	Publication
2026	Ángela Bernardo, María Álvarez del Vayo, Carmen Torrecillas, Adrián Maqueda: "Mole or cancer? The algorithm that gets one in three melanomas wrong and erases patients with dark skin"	Civio, Spain
2025	Katharina Brunner, Rebecca Ciesielski, Ingo Dachwitz, Sebastian Meineck, Maximilian Zierer: "Under Surveillance. How Location Data Jeopardizes German Security"	Bayerischer Rundfunk/BR24, netzpolitik.org, tagesschau/ARD, Germany
2024	Vitaly Soldatskikh, Ekaterina Reznikova, Roman Badanin, Katya Arenina, Boris Dubakh:"Lapdogs of War: A Guide to Russia's Wartime Oligarchs"	Proekt, Russia
2023	Juliette Garside, Simon Goodley, Jasper Jolly, Kalyeena Makortoff, Antonio Baquero, Lara Dihmis, Alex Dziadosz, Jared Ferrie, Brian Fitzpatrick, Kevin Hall, Ilya Lozovsky, Eli Moskowitz, Will Neal, Stelios Orphanides, Miranda Patrucic, Olesya Shmagun, Graham Stack, Tom Stocks, Drew Sullivan, Julia Wallace, Jonny Wrate, Jan Strozyk, Lara Dihmis, Misha Gagarin, Karina Shedrofsky, Alina Tsogoeva, Ivana Jeremić, Olena LaFoy, Bojana Pavlović, Dima Stoianov, Romina Colman, Ilia Donskikh, Nathan Jaccard, James O’Brien, Edin Pašović, Mark Nightingale: "Russian Asset Tracker"	OCCRP, The Guardian, Anti-Corruption Data Collective, Bird.bg, Delfi Estonia, Follow the Money, Forbes, Frontstory.pl, infoLibre, Inside Story, Investigative Center of Jan Kuciak, Investigace.cz, IrpiMedia, MANS, Miami Herald, Le Monde, NDR, Oštro, profil, Re:Baltica, Reporter.lu, Siena.lt, SVT, Tamedia, De Tijd, Transparency International UK
2022	Jose Miguel Calatayud, Adriana Homolova, Hendrik Lehmann, Brigitte Alfter, David Meidinger, Benedikt Brandhofer, Nikolas Zöller, Alexandra Siebenhofer, Steven Vanden Bussche, Gaby Khazalová, Bo Elkjær, Alexander Abdelilah, Sotiris Sideris, Lois Kapila, Alice Facchini, Peter Hendriks, Steinar Rostad Breivik, Micael Pereira, Peter Sabo, Manuel Gabarre, Christian Zeier, Catherine McShane, Nikolas Leontopoulos, Alexia Barakou, Moritz Wienert, Benedikt Hebeisen, Christoph Trautvetter, Elisabeth Lind, Jakub Nakládal, Mathieu Périsse, Anna Thewalt, Helena Wittlich, Sinan Recber, Sidney Gennies, Manuel Kostrzynski, Lorenzo Bagnoli, Hans Jordheim, Sara Pinho: "Cities for Rent"	Arena for Journalism in Europe, ORF, Apache, Deník Referendum, Mediapart, Der Tagesspiegel, AthensLive, Reporters United, Dublin Inquirer, IrpiMedia, E24, Expresso, elDiario.es, Reflekt, Republik, Ctxt.es, Follow The Money
2021	Maldita.es' WhatsApp Chatbot to thrive a fact-checking operation on disinformation	Maldita.es, Spain
2020	How Decât o Revistă organized an all-team pop-up newsroom in Transylvania	Decât o Revistă, Romania
2019	Guillermo Abril and Carlos Spottorno, "Palmyra, the other side"	Süddeutsche Zeitung Magazin, Germany; El País, Spain
2018	Megan Lucero, Maeve McClenaghan, Gareth Davies, Charles Boutaud, Kirsty Styles for their project Bureau Local	Bureau of Investigative Journalism, United Kingdom
2017	Christiaan Triebert: "The Turkish Coup through the Eyes of its Plotters"	Bellingcat, The Netherlands
2016	Raquel Moleiro, Hugo Franco and Joana Beleza: "Killing and Dying for Allah - Five Portuguese Members of Islamic State"	Expresso, Portugal
2015	Nicolas Kayser-Bril, Jacopo Ottaviani, Sylke Gruhnwald, Jean-Marc Manach, Jens Finnäs, Daniele Grasso, Katerina Stauroula, Alessio Cimarelli, Andrea Nelson Mauro, Alice Kohli: "The Migrant Files: Surveying migrants' deaths at Europe's door"	The Migrants' Files, Italy, Switzerland, France, Sweden, Spain and Greece
2014	Paul Lewis (journalist): "Reading the Riots"	The Guardian, United Kingdom

=== Migration Journalism Award ===
This award is honors each your one "acclaimed example of migration journalism". The award was introduced in 2023 with the support of the Robert Bosch Stiftung.

Year	Award Winner	Publication
2026	Lydia Emmanouilidou, Corina Petridi, Luděk Stavinoha, Stavros Malichudis, May Bulman, Iliana Papangeli, Galatia Iatraki, Lorenz Naegeli, Osama Abdullah, Lukas Haeuptli: "Unaccompanied children sleep on the floor in shifts in Greece’s ‘Model Camps’. The EU is aware"	Solomon, Greece, Republik, Switzerland, WAV Recherchekollektiv, Switzerland
2025	Gabriela Galvin: "Growing Up ‘Non-Western’ in Denmark's Nanny State"	New Lines Magazine, International
2024	Andrei Popoviciu:"How Europe Outsourced Border Enforcement to Africa"	In These Times, Leonard C. Goodman Institute for Investigative Reporting, International, United States
2023	Maartje Bakker, César Dezfuli: "The long road to a home in Europe"	De Volkskrant, Netherlands

=== Special Award ===
The Special Award is optional for the jury and allows them to single out high quality journalism that they think deserves special recognition. This could be awarded to an individual journalist, news organisation or specific piece of journalism.

Year	Award Winner	Publication
2026	Barbara Matejčić: "Killing for the photo"	Novosti, Croatia, BIRN, Serbia
2025	Annie Hylton, Bastian Obermayer, Corentin Bainier, Daniel Vallot, David Pegg, Edoardo Anziano, Edouard Perrin, Eloise Layan, Ershad Alijani, François Ruchti, Frederik Obermaier, Hannes Muzinger, Ilya Lozovsky, James Dowsett, Joël Matriche, Karina Chabour, Kelly Bloss, Kristof Clerix, Laurent Richard, Léa Peruchon, Leyla Mustafayeva, Louis Colart, Lorenzo Bagnoli, Lucas Brouwers, Maria Retter, Mariana Abreu, Miranda Patrucic, Olivier Zihlmann, Paciane Rouchon, Paul Lewis, Philippe Jacqué, Pierre Sorlut, Rachel Olroyd, Robert Denis, Roméo Langlois, Sandrine Rigaud, Sebastian Seibt, Sophia Stahl, Sofía Álvarez Jurado, Virginie Pironon, Wilmer Heck, Wubby Luyendijk, Youssr Youssef: "The Baku Connection"	Abzas Media, Azerbaijan, Der Standard, Austria, d'Lëtzebuerger Land, Luxemburg, Forbidden Stories, France, France 24, France, IRPI, Italy, Knack (magazine), Belgium, Le Monde, France, Le Soir, Belgium, NRC (newspaper), The Netherlands, OCCRP, International, Paper Trail Media, Germany, Radio France, France, Radio France Internationale, France, RTS, Switzerland, Tamedia, Switzerland, The Guardian, UK, ZDF, Germany, International
2024	Tina Xu, Gabriele Cruciata, Eoghan Gilmartin, Danai Maragoudaki, Barbara Matejčić, Leah Pattem, Gabriela Ramirez, Daphne Tolis, Kristiana Ludwig, Ben Heubl, Rachel Oldroyd, Felicity Lawrence, Ashifa Kassam, Lorenzo Tondo, Manisha Ganguly, Pamela Duncan:"1000 Lives, 0 Names: The Border Graves Investigation — How the EU is Failing Migrants' Last Rights"	The Guardian, Süddeutsche Zeitung, Unbias the News, Solomon, Balkan Insight, El Diario, l'Espresso, Telegram, Lithuanian Radio Television, Efsyn.gr, Documento, Lesvosnews, Kathimerini, News247, Avgi, Deutsche Welle, Al Jazeera, Jutarnji List, Tportal, Index, Novi List, Germany, UK, Spain, Greece, Italy, Croatia, Lithuania, Poland
2023	Anna Myroniuk, Alexander Khrebet: "Suicide missions, abuse, physical threats: International Legion fighters speak out against leadership’s misconduct"	The Kyiv Independent, Ukraine
2022	Lara Bonilla, Ricard Marfà, Idoia Longan: "Woman's body, man's medicine"	Diari ARA, Spain
2021	Paying tribute to all brave journalists working in Belarus	
2020	BIRN Bosnia and Herzegovina team, for their reporting on war crimes trials and other transitional justice issues	BIRN, Bosnia and Herzegovina
2019	Forbidden Stories team and partners, for their organisation Forbidden Stories	
2018	Ida Nyegård Espersen: "This crime only requires poverty, internet, and a distant buyer"	Jyllands-Posten, Denmark
2017	Irina Tacu, Ana Maria Ciobanu, Andreea Giuclea, Christian Lupșa and Oana Sandu: "Colectiv"	Decât o Revistă, Romania
2016	Gert van Langendonck: "Off to Europe"	NRC, The Netherlands
2016	Amrai Coen and Henning Sussebach: "In the Promised Land"	Die Zeit, Germany
2016	Anders Fjellberg and Tomm W. Chriistiansen: "The Wetsuitman"	Dagbladet, Norway
2015	Paul Radu, Drew Sullivan, Miranda Patrucić, et al. for their organisation The Organized Crime and Corruption Reporting Project	Organized Crime and Corruption Reporting Project, Bosnia and Herzegovina
2014	Alan Rusbridger	The Guardian, United Kingdom
2014	Yavuz Baydar	censored media, Turkey

== European Cartoon Award ==
In 2019, the European Cartoon Award was founded in cooperation with Studio Europa Maastricht. This new Award aims to promote and encourage European cartoonists, while preserving the endangered form of art and great asset to journalism. The winner of the first edition was the French cartoonist and illustrator Anne Derenne for her cartoon “Jenga – the earth’s sixth mass distinction.”

== See also ==
- Category:European Press Prize winners
