= Nationaal Bus Museum =

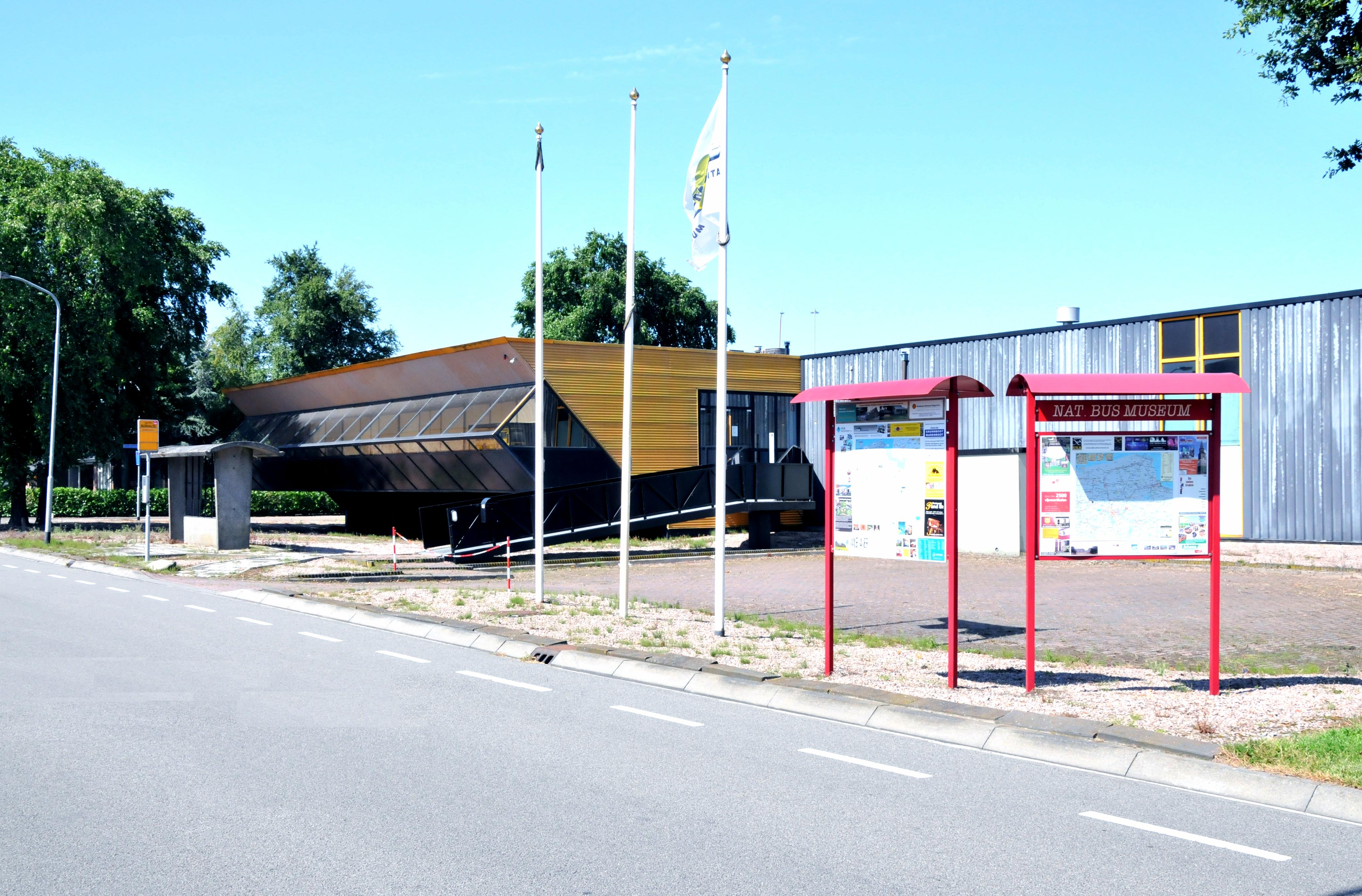
- Nationaal Bus Museum in 2012

- Location in Groningen in the Netherlands
- Location: Produktieweg 13; Hoogezand, Netherlands
- Coordinates: 53°09′55″N 06°43′46″E
- Type: Transport museum
- Visitors: 27,027 (2015)
- Chairperson: Willem Goelema
- Website: www.nationaalbusmuseum.nl

The Nationaal Bus Museum (Dutch pronunciation: [nɑ(t)ɕoːˌnaːl ˈbʏs myˈzeːjʏm]; English: National Bus Museum) is a transport museum in Hoogezand in the Netherlands. The museum has a collection of Dutch buses. With 27,027 visitors in 2015, it is one of the most-visited museums in the province of Groningen.

== Location ==
The museum is located at the Produktieweg in the village of Hoogezand, part of the municipality of Hoogezand-Sappemeer, in the province of Groningen in the northeast of the Netherlands.

== Collection ==
The museum has a collection of buses and bus-related objects from the Netherlands, especially from the northern part of the country.

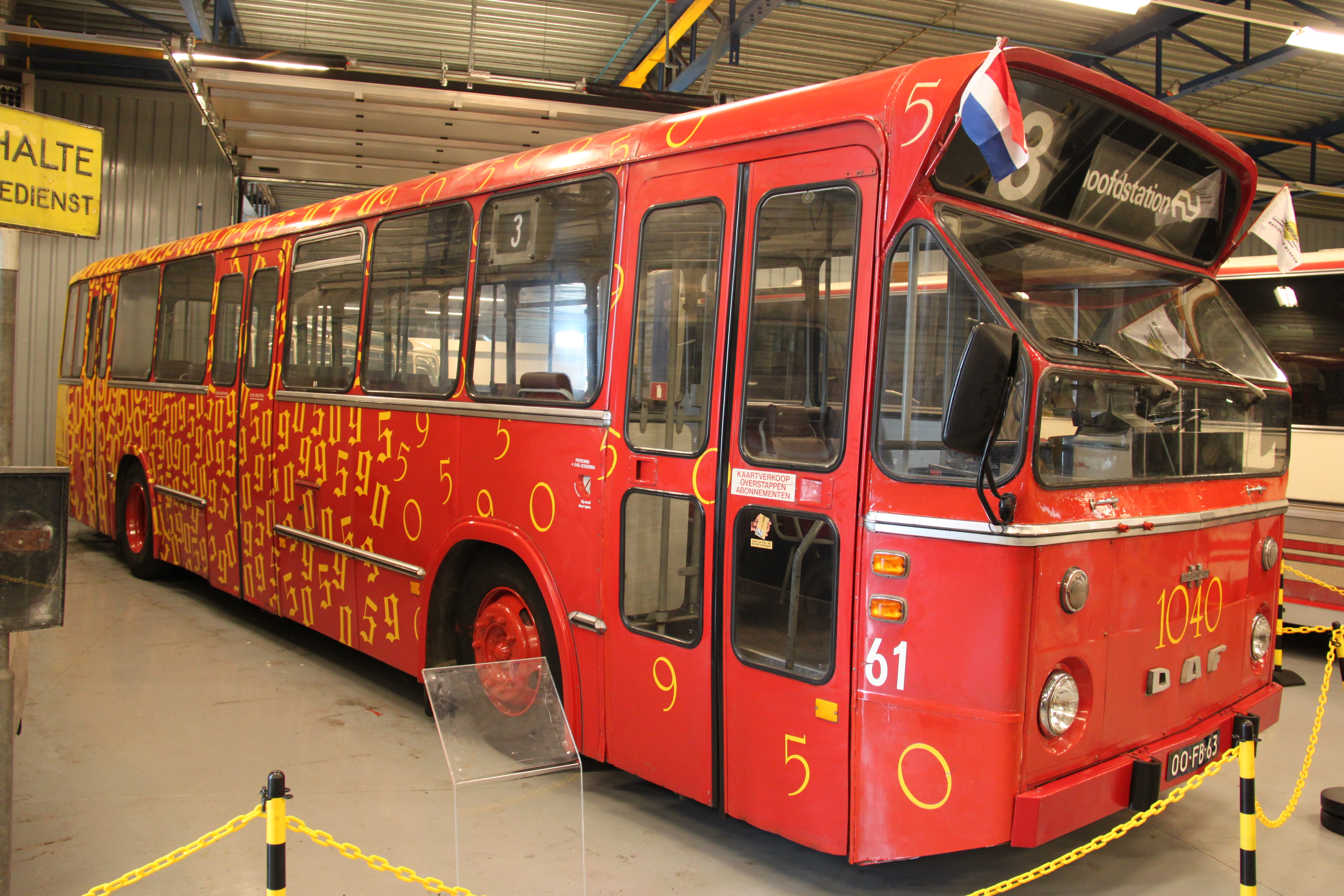
GVBG 61

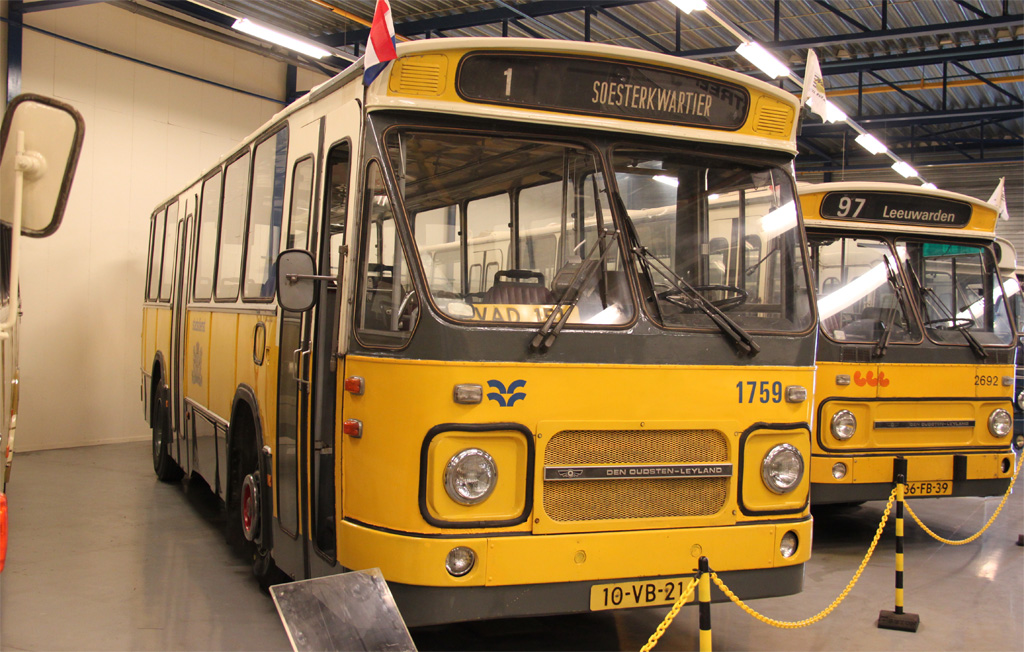
Nefkens 59/VAD 1759

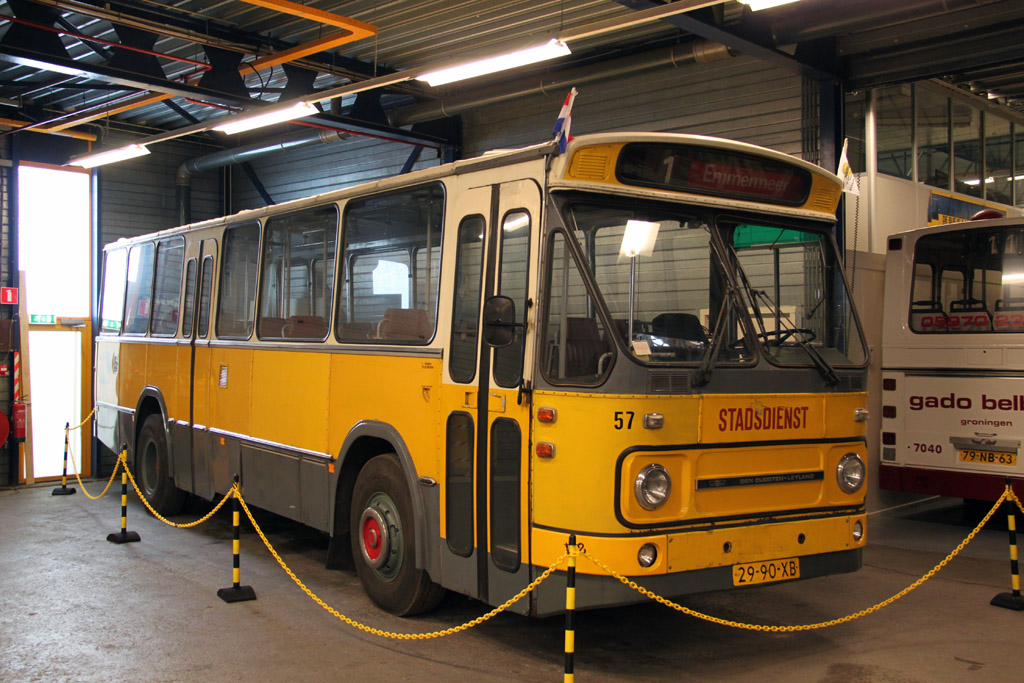
DVM 57

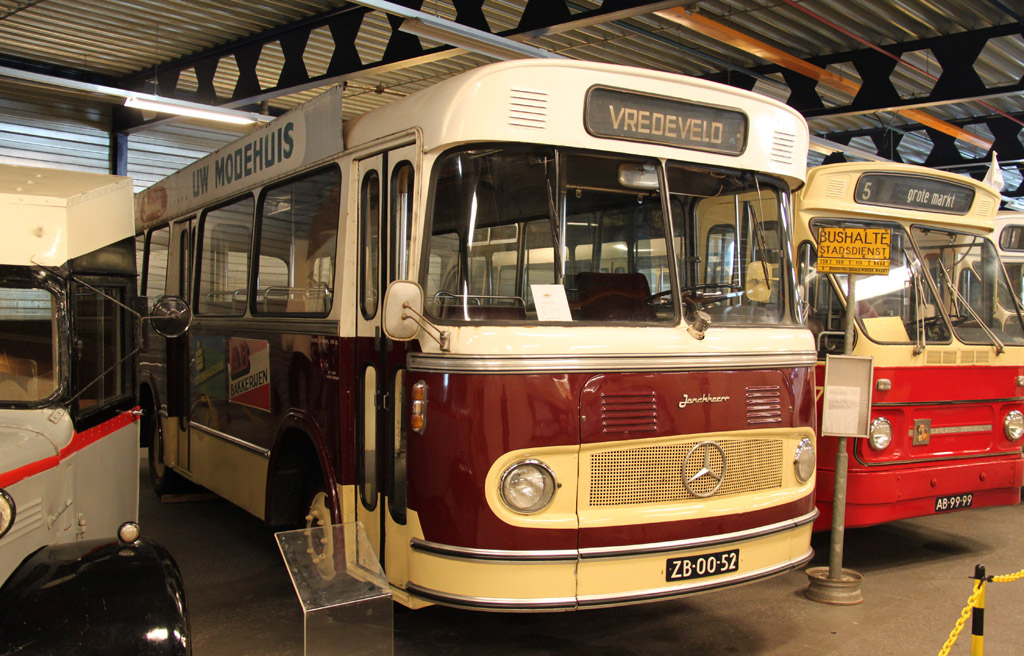
Harmanni 66

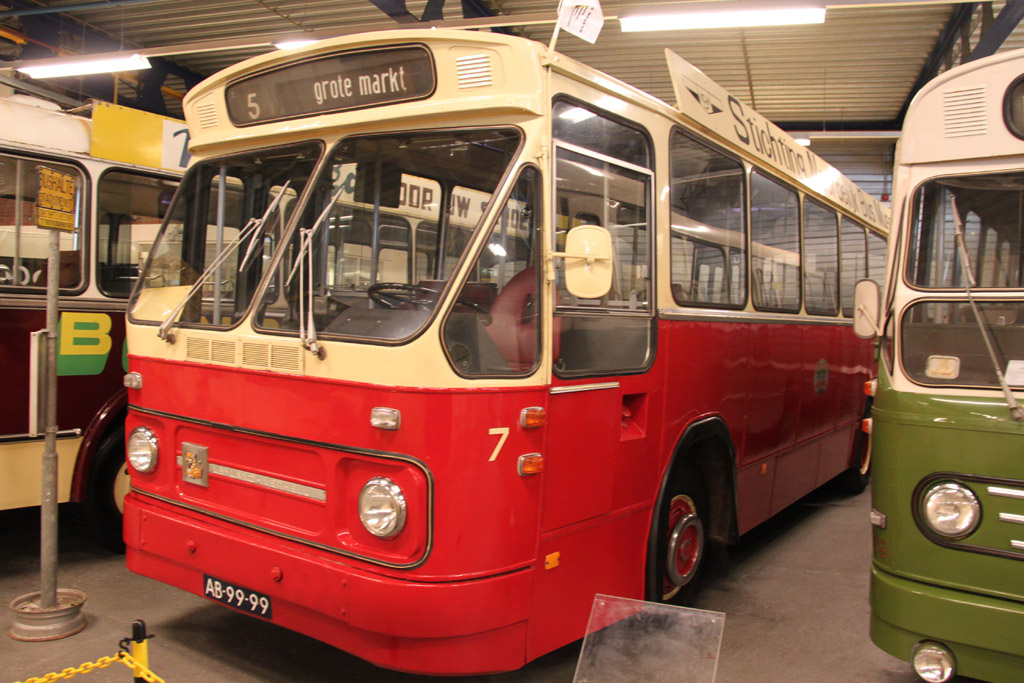
GVG 7

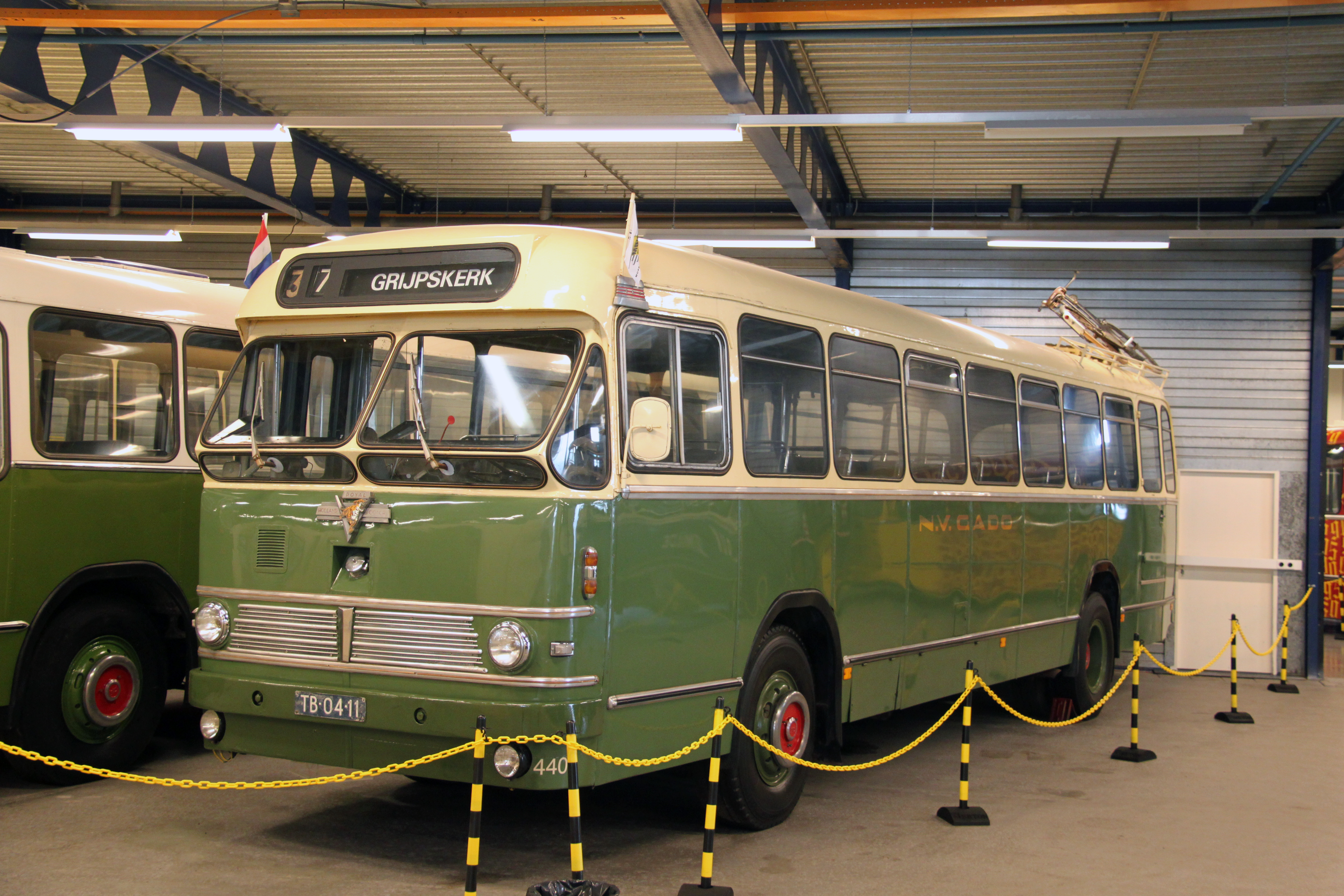
GADO 4400

== Administration ==
Year	Visitors	Year	Visitors
2003	14,886	2010	21,107
2004	21,243	2011	18,706
2005	23,917	2012	20,383
2006	17,500	2013	18,812
2007	14,542	2014	28,260
2008	20,630	2015	27,027
2009	21,265		

Willem Goelema is chairman of the museum.

The museum had 18,812 visitors in 2013, 28,260 visitors in 2014, and 27,027 visitors in 2015. The visitor numbers are including museum bus rides. It is one of six museums in Groningen with more than 25 thousand visitors in 2015, making it one of the most-visited museums of the province that year.

Since 2015, the museum has been registered in the Museumregister Nederland (Netherlands Museum Register), a quality mark for museums in the Netherlands.
