= HNLMS Cornelis Drebbel (A886) =

Dutch accommodation ship

History

Netherlands
- Name: Cornelis Drebbel
- Namesake: Cornelis Drebbel
- Operator: Royal Netherlands Navy
- Builder: Shipyard Voorwaarts, Hoogezand
- Laid down: 18 May 1970
- Launched: 19 November 1970
- Commissioned: 30 November 1971

General characteristics
- Type: Accommodation ship
- Displacement: 775 t (763 long tons)
- Length: 68.6 m (225 ft 1 in)
- Beam: 12.6 m (41 ft 4 in)
- Draught: 1.2 m (3 ft 11 in)

HNLMS Cornelis Drebbel (A886) was a accommodation ship of the Royal Netherlands Navy (RNN). The ship was built in the Netherlands and replaced the former Cornelis Drebbel, which was also a accommodation ship of the RNN.

== Design and construction ==
Cornelis Drebbel was built at the shipyard Voorwaarts in Hoogezand. The ship was laid down on 18 May 1970, launched on 19 November 1970 and commissioned into the Royal Netherlands Navy (RNN) on 30 November 1971. The construction of Cornelis Drebbel is estimated to have cost a total of around 3 million Dutch guilders. The ship replaced the former Cornelis Drebbel, which was also a accommodation ship of the RNN.

Cornelis Drebbel could accommodate 201 people and resembled a floating three story apartment building.

== Service history ==
After being commissioned Cornelis Drebbel was towed to Rotterdam. There the ship provided accommodation to Dutch navy personnel who served on navy ships that were being repaired at shipyards in Rotterdam.

On 26 August 1978 Cornelis Drebbel was moved from the shipyard of Wilton-Fijenoord in Schiedam to the shipyard of Rotterdamsche Droogdok Maatschappij in Rotterdam.
