= BIRN Bosnia and Herzegovina =

Balkan Investigative Reporting Network Bosnia and Herzegovina
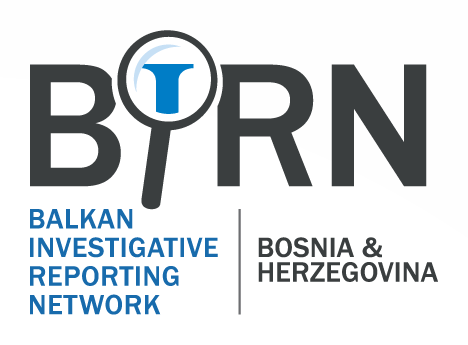
- Formation: January 2005
- Type: NGO based in Sarajevo specialized in monitoring and reporting war crimes trials
- Headquarters: Sarajevo
- Region served: Court Monitoring: Sarajevo; Eastern Sarajevo; Travnik; Bijeljina; Tuzla; Mostar; Livno; Gorazde; Gacko; Zenica; Bihac; Doboj; Brcko; Banja Luka
- Official language: Bosnian; Croatian; Serbian; English
- Country Director: Denis Džidić
- Staff: 40 + employees
- Website: detektor.ba

The Balkan Investigative Reporting Network Bosnia and Herzegovina (BIRN BiH) is a non-profit organization based in Sarajevo that reports on war crimes trials before the courts of Bosnia and Herzegovina. BIRN BiH is a member of the BIRN network, which includes BIRN Hub, BIRN Ltd, BIRN Kosovo, BIRN Macedonia, and BIRN Serbia.

BIRN network's publications include the Justice Series: Media, Civil Society, and War Crime Trials, Balkan Insight, Balkan Transitional Justice. The Justice Series is a media program run by BIRN BiH and consists of the organization’s flagship publication Justice Report, Radio Justice, and TV Justice. These projects communicate via 300 media outlets reaching close to one million people worldwide. They include daily, weekly, and monthly radio and TV programs, online articles, reports, and analyses in English and Bosnian/Croatian/Serbian. In addition, BIRN BiH founded the Association of Court Reporters, a countrywide advocacy network in charge of promoting judiciary media cooperation.

== History ==
BIRN BiH was established in January 2005 to address the absence of media attention towards issues related to transitional justice and post-war reconciliation. Since its foundation, BIRN BiH has analyzed and informed the public on war crimes trials at the state and local courts throughout Bosnia and Herzegovina. Today, it remains one of the few sources of information on war crimes prosecution before the domestic judiciary.

== Notable reporting ==
During his stay at The Hague Tribunal, Miodrag Stojanovic, a member of the Defence Council of Ratko Mladic, said BIRN's Justice Report was his only link to what was happening in BiH when it comes to the work of the Court of BiH war crimes processing.

Another Defence lawyer at The Hague Tribunal, Peter Robinson, who is advising Radovan Karadžić said: "BIRN – Justice Report is highly objective and professional from all other media. It is very useful in my work and I read it every day."

Many academic institutions rely on BIRN’s reports. At Duke University in the United States, BIRN materials are assigned as mandatory reading in some undergraduate courses. Others, including Impunity Watch, Swiss Association Against Impunity TRIAL, Human Rights Watch, University College London School of Slavonic and East European Studies, Global Investigative Journalism Network, and the ICTY, have consistently referenced BIRN BiH as an excellent source of reporting.

In 2020, BIRN BiH was awarded the Special Award by the European Press Prize for their work.
