= Luciano Carty =

Dutch footballer (born 2001)

Personal information
- Date of birth: 2 October 2001 (age 25)
- Place of birth: Midden-Groningen, Netherlands
- Height: 1.77 m (5 ft 10 in)
- Position: Winger

Team information
- Current team: VV Oosterparkers

Youth career
- VV Hoogezand

Senior career*
Years	Team	Apps	(Gls)
2020–2022	FC Emmen	6	(0)
2023	APEA Akrotiri	12	(0)
2025-	VV Oosterparkers		
- * Club domestic league appearances and goals as of 14:09, 25 July 2023 (UTC)

Luciano Carty (born 2 October 2001) is a Dutch footballer who plays as a winger for amateur side VV Oosterparkers.

== Club career ==
Carty initially played youth football in his home town of Hoogezand before a switching across to FC Emmen for under-15 level. Carty made his debut for FC Emmen on 19 September 2020 away against PSV Eindhoven. In June 2021 Carty signed a new contract with Emmen keeping him at the club until 2023.

Carty's contract with Emmen was terminated on 30 December 2022.

On 9 January 2023, Carty signed with Cypriot Third Division club APEA Akrotiri.

== International career ==
In October 2025, Carty received a call-up for the Sint Maarten national football team.
