= 100% NL TV =

Dutch TV music channel

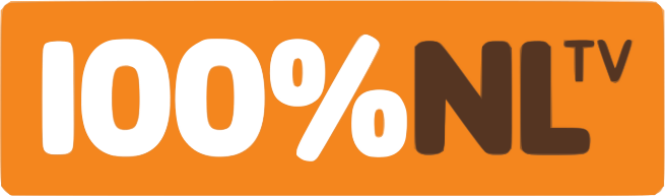
- Country: Netherlands
- Broadcast area: Netherlands
- Headquarters: Naarden, Netherlands

Programming
- Picture format: 1080i HDTV (downscaled to 16:9 576i for the SDTV feed)

Ownership
- Owner: Radiocorp B.V.
- Sister channels: Slam!TV

History
- Launched: 1 October 2013; 12 years ago

Links
- Website: www.100p.nl

Availability

Streaming media
- Ziggo GO: ZiggoGO.tv (Europe only)

100% NL TV is a non-stop music television channel that airs mainly music videos of Dutch artists. The channel launched through cable operator Ziggo on 1 October 2013. It is a collaboration between radio station 100% NL and music channel Lite TV. The channel broadcasts 24 hours a day. It airs across the Netherlands.

== See also ==
- 100% NL
