= Tjerkgaast =

Tjerkgaast Tsjerkgaast
- Village
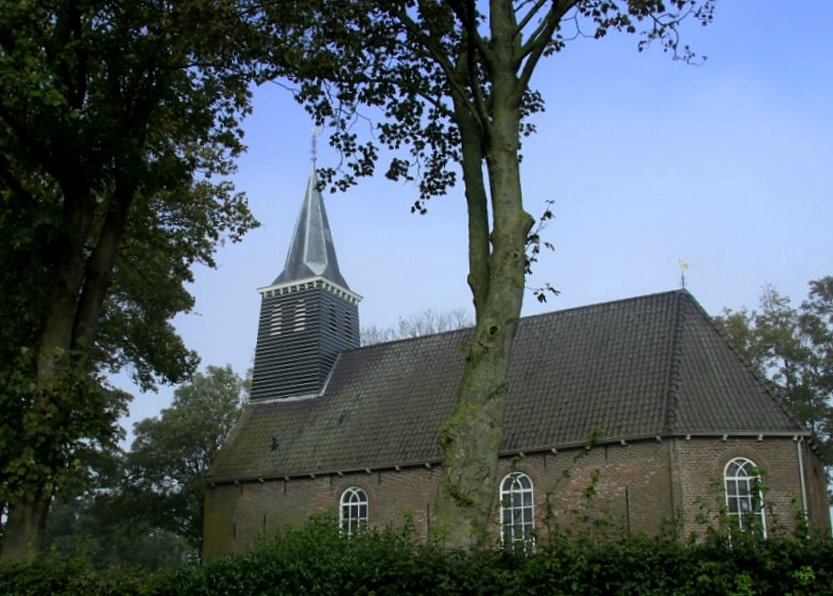
- Tjerkgaast church

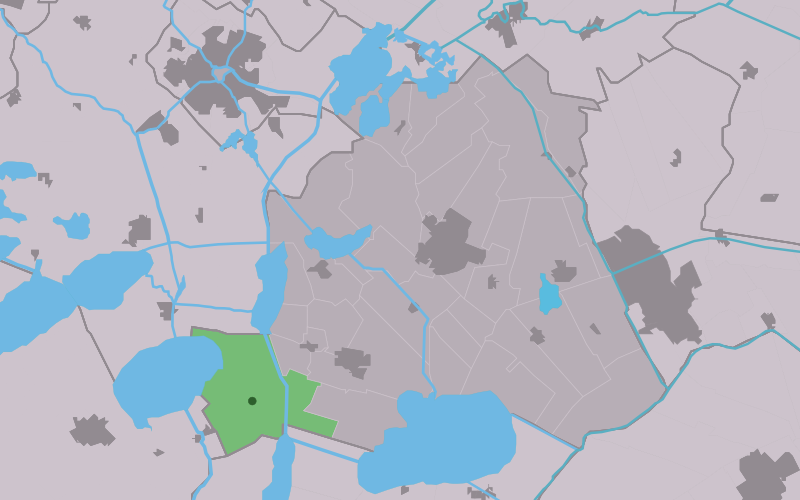
- Location in the former Skarsterlân municipality

- Location in the Netherlands Tjerkgaast (Netherlands)
- Country: Netherlands
- Province: Friesland
- Municipality: De Fryske Marren

Area
  - Total: 19.24 km^{2} (7.43 sq mi)
- Elevation: −0.6 m (−2.0 ft)

Population (2021)
  - Total: 350
  - Density: 18/km^{2} (47/sq mi)
- Time zone: UTC+1 (CET)
  - Summer (DST): UTC+2 (CEST)
- Postal code: 8522
- Dialing code: 0514

Tjerkgaast (West Frisian: Tsjerkgaast) is a village in De Fryske Marren municipality in the province of Friesland, the Netherlands. It had a population of around 380 in 2017.

== History ==
The village was first mentioned in 1413 as Tzerckgeest, and means church on high sandy ridge. Tjerkgaast is a road village which centres around the church. The church was built in 1703 as a replacement of the medieval predecessor. The western wall is a remainder of the older church. Huize Spannenburg is a neoclassical building from 1845 and has been built as a replacement of the Douma State which had been built in 1793 in Langweer. In 1840, Tjerkgaast was home to 210 people.

Before 2014, Tjerkgaast was part of the Skarsterlân municipality and before 1984 it was part of Doniawerstal.

== Gallery ==
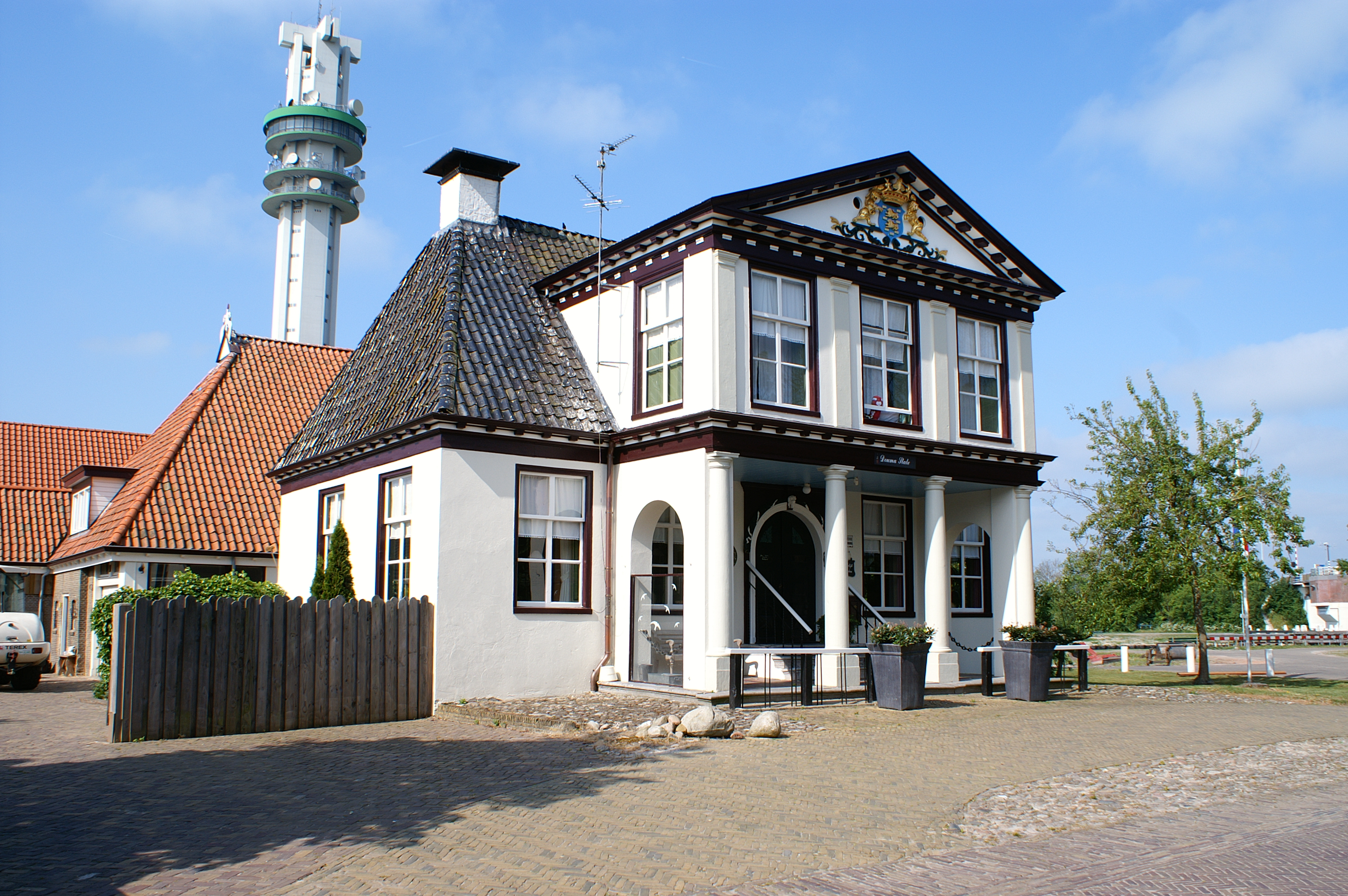
Huize Spanneburg

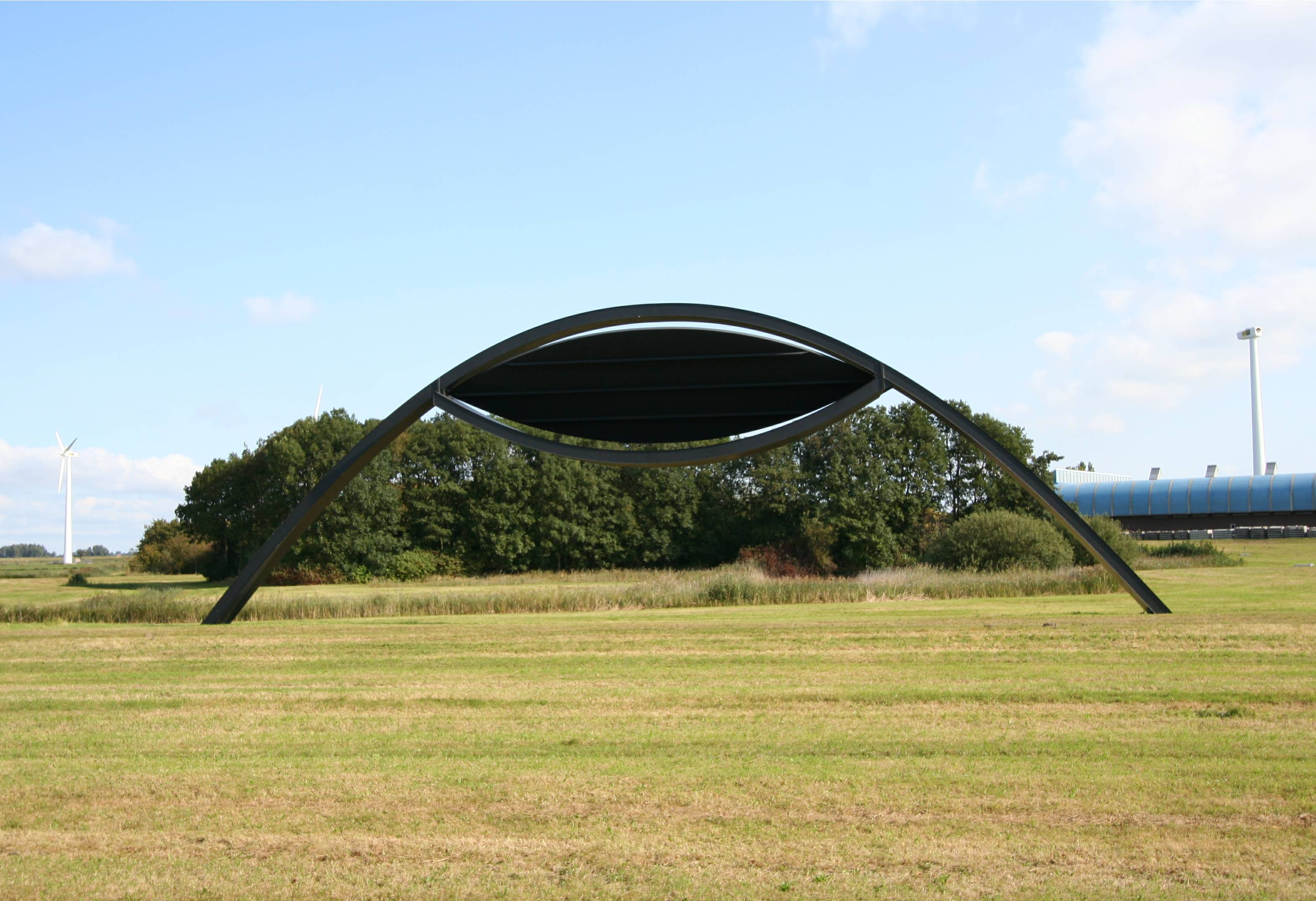
The Eye statue

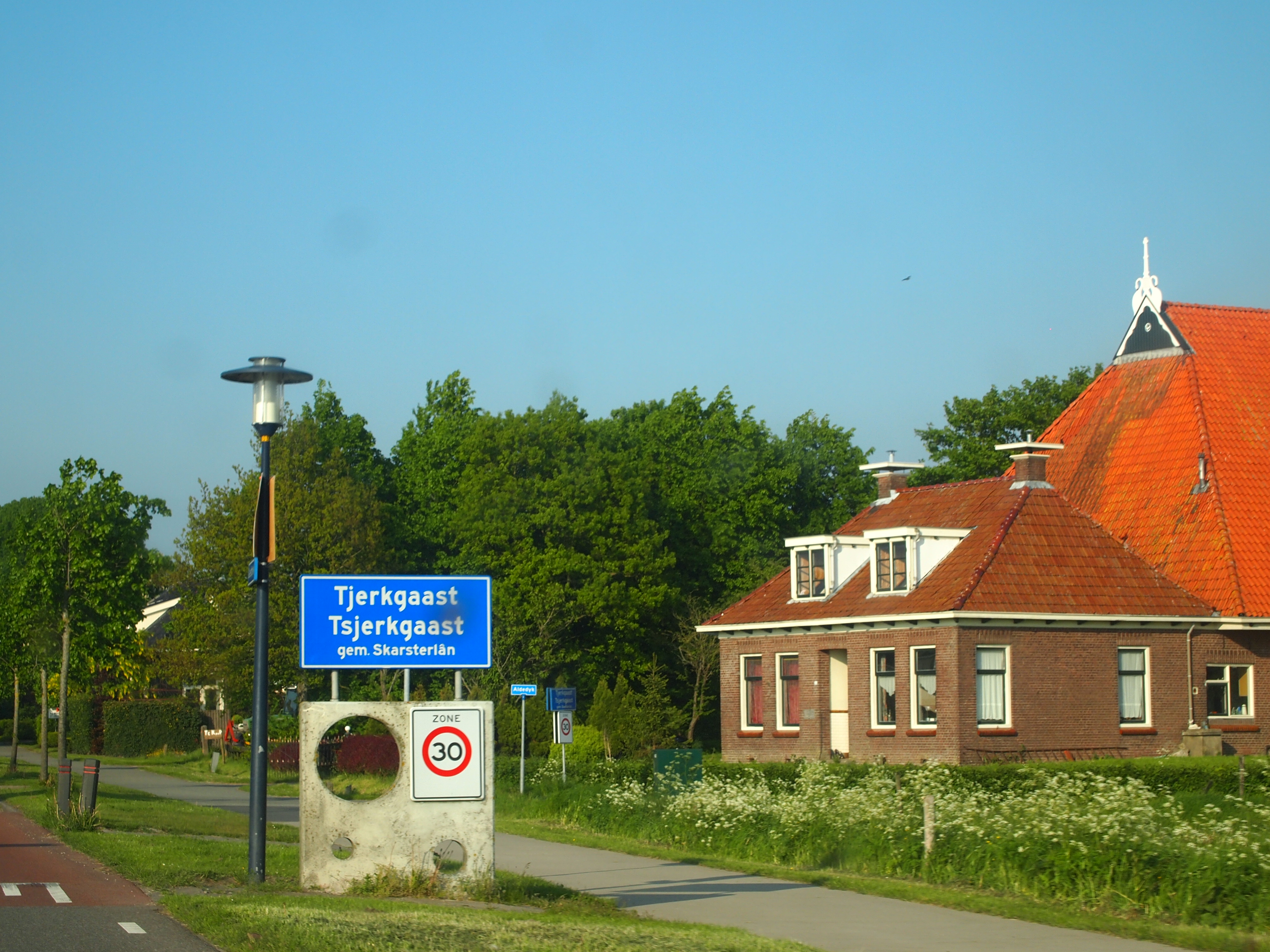
Welcome to Tjerkgaast

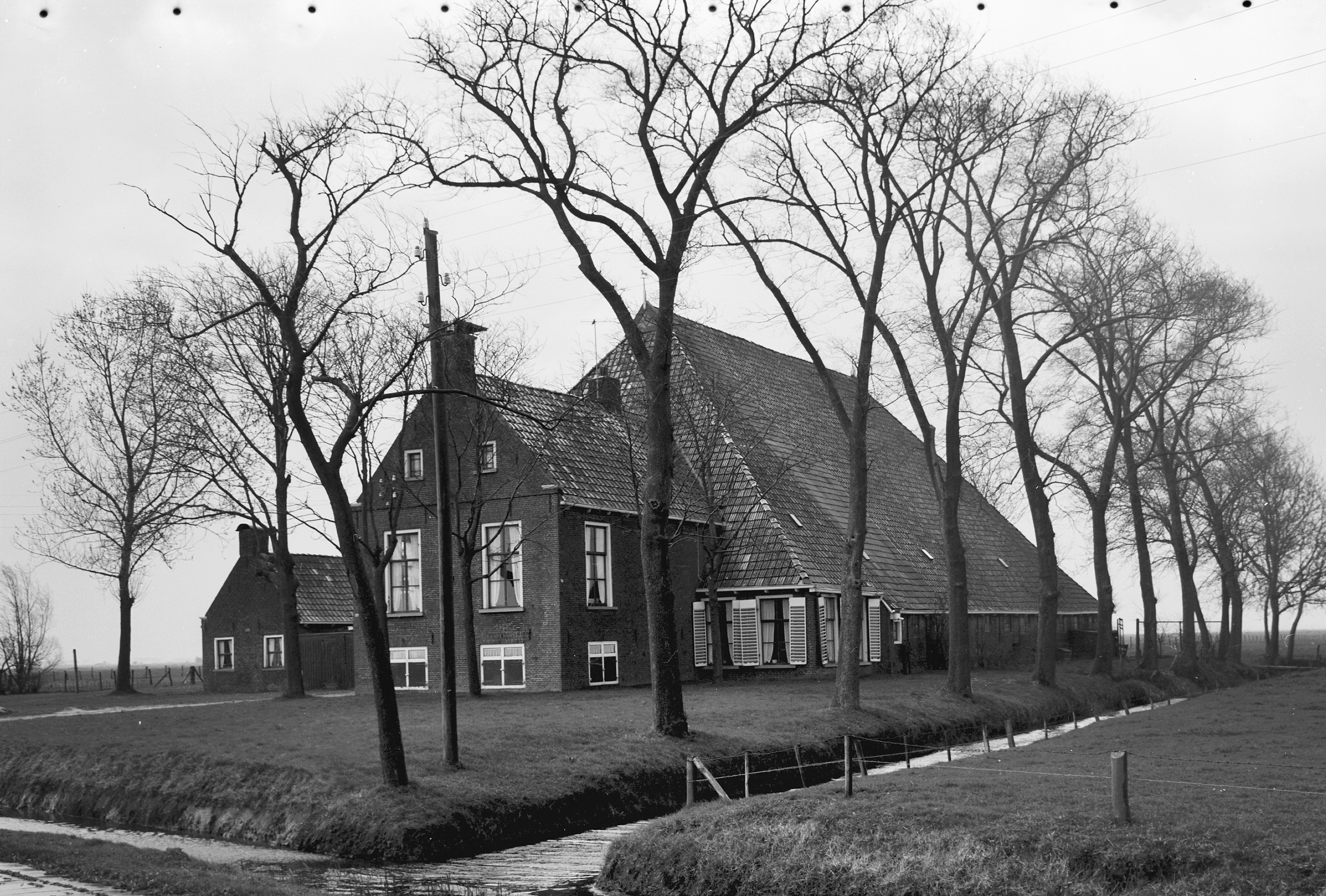
Galamastate
