= What Fun! =

Dutch pop-reggae group

What Fun! is a pop-reggae group based in Haarlem, Netherlands founded in 1981. Within two years, the group grew rapidly in size to a total of ten members and success quickly followed in 1983 with the release of the single "The Right Side Won", which reached #3 in the Dutch hit parade in December of that year, and #1 in Belgium. "The Right Side Won", inspired by the Falklands War between the United Kingdom and Argentina, made the BBC Radio 1 playlist, but was quickly removed when the content of the lyrics became apparent. The single was banned from release in South Africa because What Fun! had both black and white members. The group toured intensively in the Netherlands and Belgium during the period of 1983–1989 and two further singles ("Let's Get Digital" and "Many Men, Many Minds") and an LP ("Having Fun?") were released in the Benelux. By 1989 What Fun! had run out of steam and the members went their separate ways, only to reform again in 2005 with five of the original members and three new ones.
