= Hoogezand =

- Town
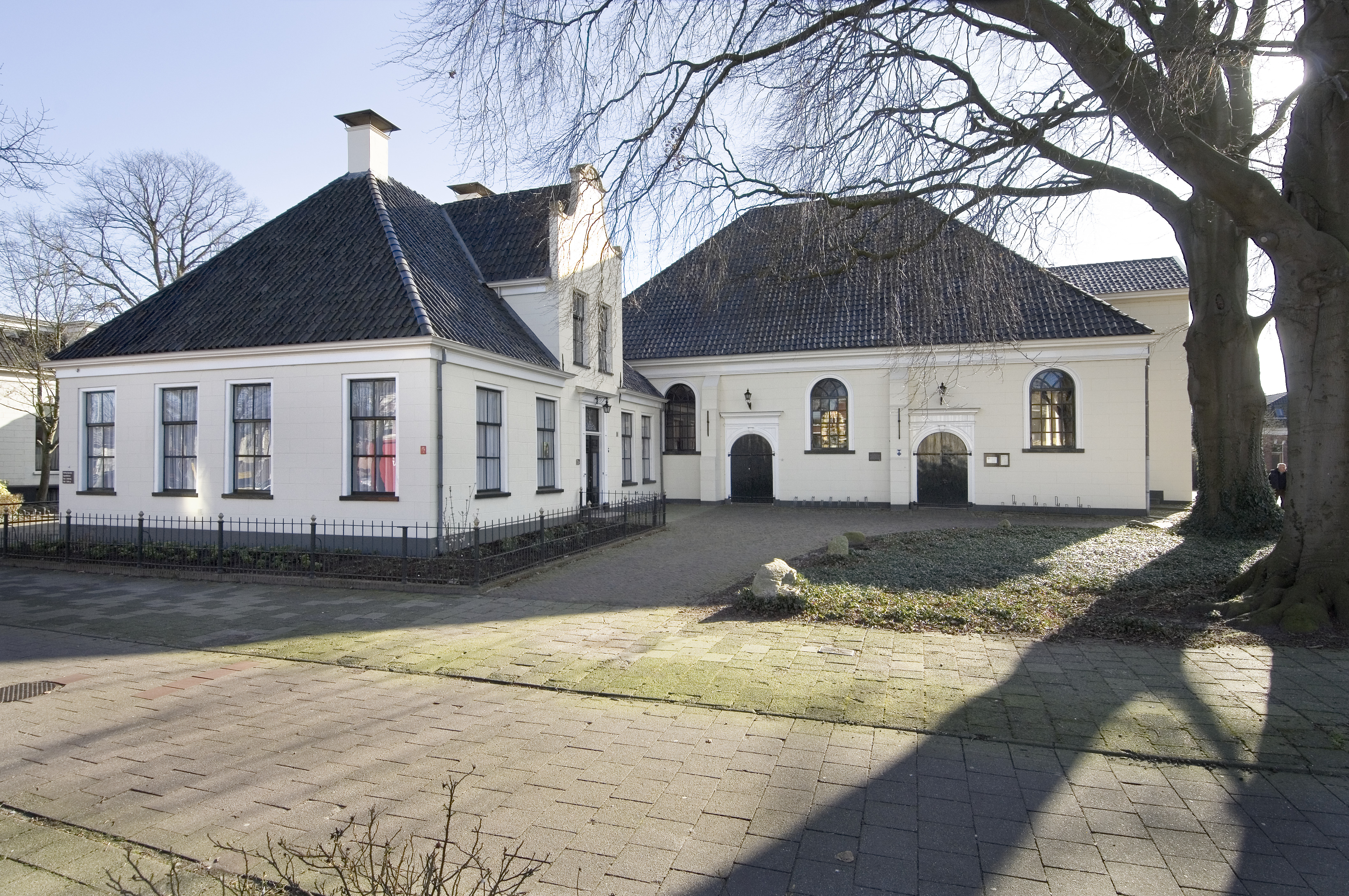
- Protestant Church in 2008

- Flag Coat of arms

- Location of Hoogezand in the province of Groningen
- Coordinates: 53°9′26″N 6°45′12″E
- Country: Netherlands
- Province: Groningen
- Municipality: Midden-Groningen

Population (2023)
  - Total: 22,080
- Major roads: A7 N385 N386

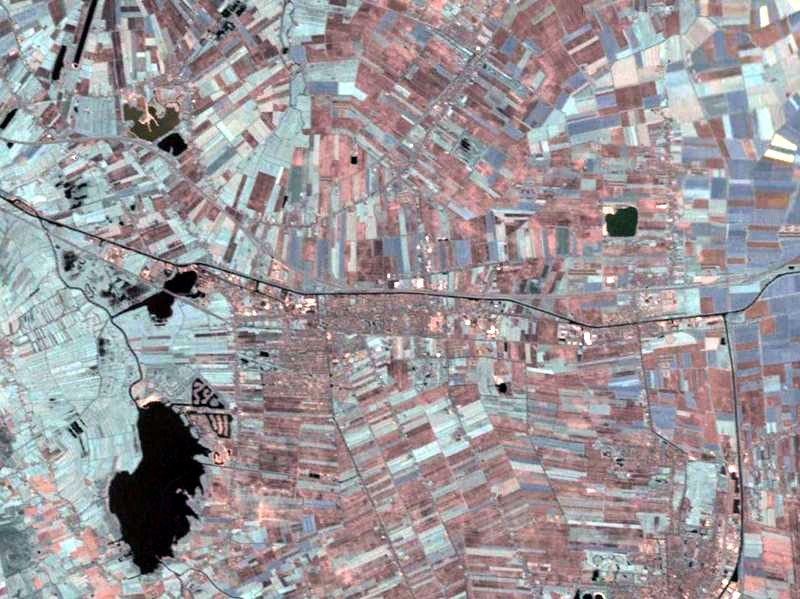
Satellite photo of the area

Hoogezand (Dutch pronunciation: [ˌɦoːɣəˈzɑnt]) is a town in the municipality of Midden-Groningen, in the province of Groningen in the northeast of the Netherlands.

== History ==
The name refers to a higher sanded (Hooge Sandt) place in the peatlands cut through when the Winschoterdiep channel was dug. Near this channel in 1618 the town was founded.

In the beginning the town was a center of peat briquettes producing. When the peat ran out opened factories for cardboard and plants for potato processing . At the moment Hoogezand is most known for the shipbuilding industry. At the shipyards the vessels are launched sideways, which is uncommon for slipways.

In 1821 Hoogezand absorbed former municipality Windeweer. In 1949 Hoogezand and Sappemeer became one city. At the moment Hoogezand-Sappemeer has 34,438 citizens (2005), around 21,000 of them live in Hoogezand. In 2018, the municipality of Hoogezand-Sappemeer merged with the municipalities of Slochteren and Menterwolde to form the new municipality of Midden-Groningen

== Culture ==
The Nationaal Bus Museum opened its doors in Hoogezand in 2013.

== Transportation ==
Railway station: Hoogezand-Sappemeer

In Western Hoogezand, Martenshoek railway station may be closer.

== Notable residents ==
- Luciano Carty professional footballer.
