= Windeweer =

- former village and municipality
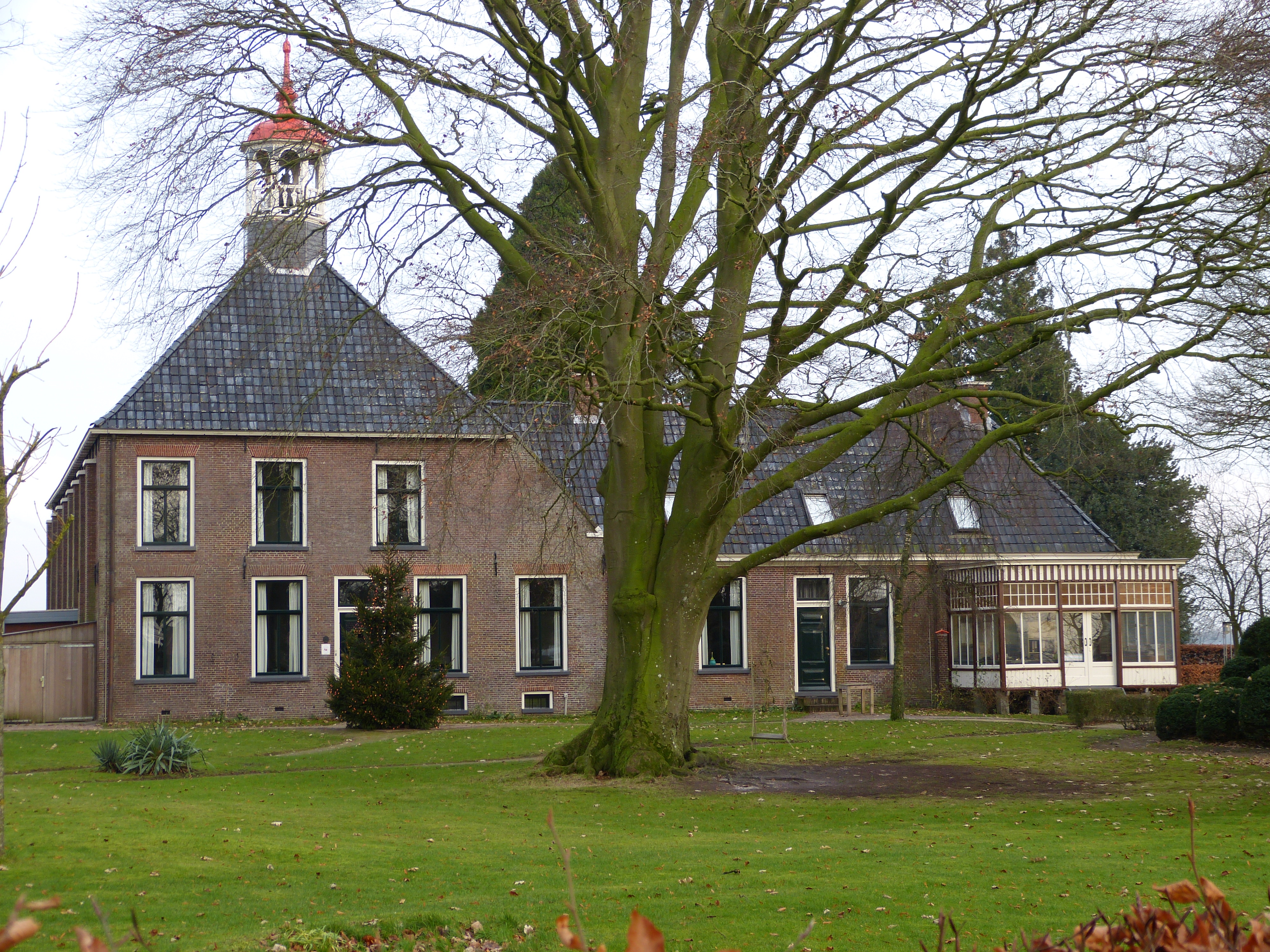
- The church of Windeweer

- Location in province of Groningen in the Netherlands Windeweer (Netherlands)
- Coordinates: 53°07′N 6°47′E
- Country: Netherlands
- Province: Groningen
- Municipality: Midden-Groningen

Area
  - Total: 14.58 km^{2} (5.63 sq mi)
- Elevation: 3 m (9.8 ft)

Population (2021)
  - Total: 865
  - Density: 59.3/km^{2} (154/sq mi)
- Time zone: UTC+1 (CET)
  - Summer (DST): UTC+2 (CEST)
- Postal code: 9605
- Dialing code: 0598

Windeweer is a former municipality in the Dutch province of Groningen. It existed until 1821, when it was merged with Hoogezand. Since 2018, it is part of Midden-Groningen. The villages of Windeweer and Kiel have grown together and are nowadays known as Kiel-Windeweer. Windeweer is the southern part of the village.
