= Christiaan Triebert =

Dutch journalist (born 1991)

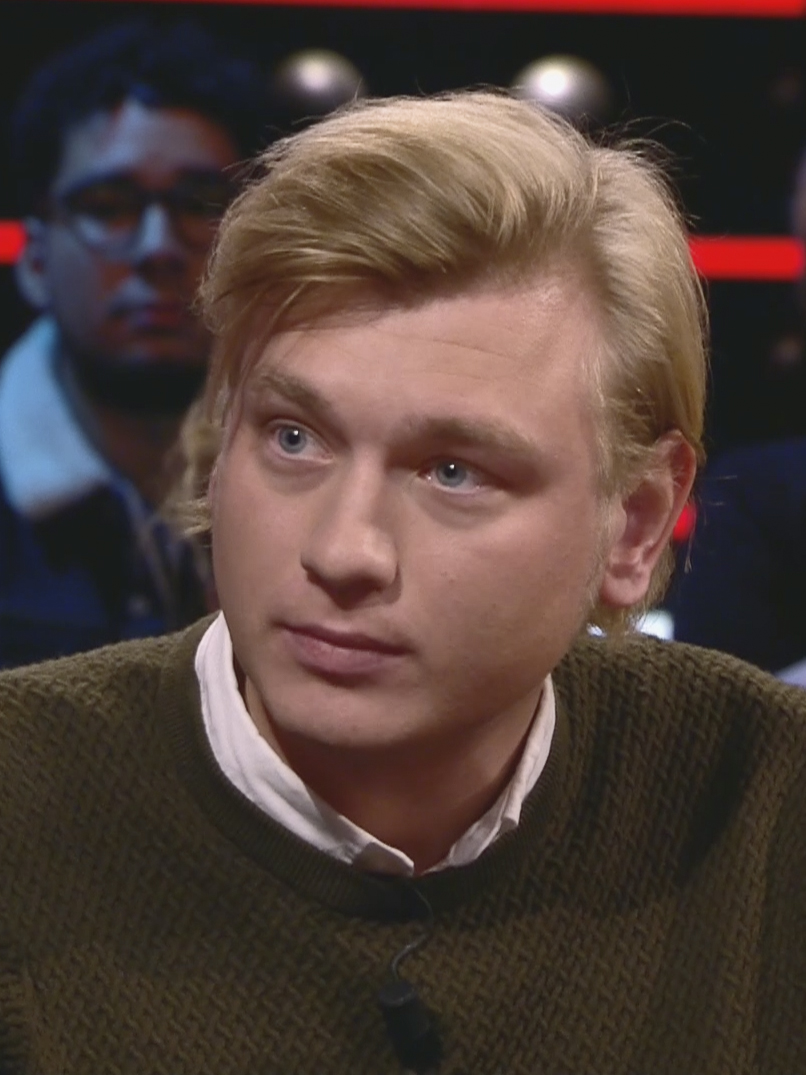
- Triebert in 2018
- Born: February 1991 (age 35); Leeuwarden, Netherlands
- Education: University of Groningen (BA); King's College London (MA)
- Occupation: Investigative journalist
- Employer: The New York Times
- Known for: Open-source investigation
- Awards: Pulitzer Prize for International Reporting (2020, 2022); European Press Prize (2017)

Christiaan Triebert (born February 1991) is a Dutch investigative journalist who works on the Visual Investigations team of The New York Times. He specialises in open-source investigation, the verification and analysis of publicly available material such as social media video, satellite imagery and flight and shipping data. Before joining the Times in 2019 he was a senior investigator and trainer at the research collective Bellingcat.

Triebert shared in two Pulitzer Prizes awarded to the Times: in 2020, for a series on Russian military operations that included evidence of Russian air strikes on hospitals in Syria, and in 2022, for reporting on civilian casualties caused by United States air strikes in Afghanistan, Iraq and Syria. In 2017 he received the European Press Prize Innovation Award for a reconstruction of the 2016 Turkish coup attempt built from leaked WhatsApp messages.

== Early life and education ==
Triebert was born in Leeuwarden, in the Dutch province of Friesland, to a Frisian mother and a father from Java, Indonesia. His paternal grandparents moved to the Netherlands in 1949, when his father was a year old. His father, Edwin Triebert, was a lawyer. The family lived near the Leeuwarden Air Base, which Triebert later cited as one of the reasons he became interested in Dutch participation in air campaigns abroad.

As a secondary school pupil he wrote a research paper on the 2003 invasion of Iraq, examining whether the widely broadcast toppling of a statue of Saddam Hussein in Baghdad had been staged. He has said that the Collateral Murder video published by WikiLeaks in 2010 made him want to become a journalist. Before and during his studies he travelled widely by train and by hitchhiking, including a 2012 trip from Groningen to Cape Town with two friends.

From 2010 to 2015 Triebert studied at the University of Groningen, where he took bachelor's degrees in international relations and international organisations and in philosophy, and followed courses in Middle Eastern studies and Arabic. He then completed a master's degree in conflict, security and development at King's College London, writing his thesis while living in Kuala Lumpur.

== Career ==
=== Early work and Bellingcat ===
In 2015 Triebert travelled to Iraq to report for the Leeuwarder Courant, the regional newspaper of Friesland, on an unpaid basis. He has said the experience left him doubtful about what he could add as a reporter on the ground, and that he found it easier to establish facts by examining material published online. He began using Google Earth and satellite imagery to try to match air strikes by the Dutch air force in Iraq and Syria to specific locations, and posted his findings on Twitter. He also worked as a freelance photographer and reporter in Ukraine and Iraq, and his early work appeared in outlets including Foreign Policy, The Daily Beast and the Al Jazeera Media Institute.

Around the same time he took part in online geolocation games, in which participants tried to identify where a photograph had been taken. According to de Volkskrant, he won so often that other participants lost interest. Through these networks he came into contact with Eliot Higgins, founder of Bellingcat, who invited him to join the collective in 2015 while Triebert was still a student. At Bellingcat he became a senior investigator and lead trainer, giving workshops on open-source verification to journalists in Africa, Asia, Europe, the Middle East and Latin America. He also worked with Airwars, a monitoring group that documents civilian harm from air strikes by the United States-led coalition in Iraq and Syria.

In 2016 Triebert reconstructed the attempted coup in Turkey using WhatsApp messages exchanged by the officers involved, which had leaked onto the internet. The piece, "The Turkish Coup through the Eyes of its Plotters", won the European Press Prize Innovation Award in 2017. In 2018 he worked with the World Press Photo Foundation to verify the winning images of its annual contest. That year he also collaborated with The New York Times on several projects, including a reconstruction of the killing of Jamal Khashoggi. In December 2018 the Dutch magazine Vrij Nederland published a cover story on him, describing him as a "Sherlock Holmes 3.0".

Triebert appeared in the 2018 documentary Bellingcat: Truth in a Post-Truth World by Hans Pool, and in June 2019 he was interviewed alongside Higgins by Christiane Amanpour on CNN about the film. He wrote the foreword to Higgins's 2021 book We Are Bellingcat.

=== The New York Times ===
Triebert joined the Visual Investigations team of The New York Times in March 2019, shortly after the team was set up. The team combines conventional reporting with the analysis of video, satellite imagery, social media posts and other digital material to reconstruct events, often where misconduct by police or armed forces is alleged. He has said that when the Times first contacted him in 2017 he assumed the newspaper wanted to interview him, and that Dutch newspapers he had applied to had told him his work was interesting but "not really journalism".

At the Times Triebert worked on an investigation that used cockpit audio and flight data to show that Russian pilots had bombed hospitals in Syria, including four in a single twelve-hour period in May 2019. The work was part of a series on Russian operations in Syria, Europe and Africa for which the Times received the 2020 Pulitzer Prize for International Reporting. The German delegation raised the findings at the United Nations Security Council; Triebert later noted that Russia bombed one of the same hospitals again a few weeks afterwards.

In 2021 he contributed to an investigation of a United States drone strike in Kabul carried out during the American withdrawal from Afghanistan. The Pentagon had described the strike as justified; the Times established that the target was an aid worker, and the Pentagon acknowledged the error about a week after publication. He was also part of the team behind "The Civilian Casualty Files", based on Pentagon assessments of civilian deaths from American air strikes in Iraq and Syria, which earned the Times a second Pulitzer Prize for International Reporting in 2022.

Other investigations he has worked on include a reconstruction of the January 6 United States Capitol attack, published as the documentary Day of Rage, which was shortlisted for an Academy Award; analysis of intercepted Russian radio traffic near Makariv during the early weeks of the Russian invasion of Ukraine in 2022; the investigation into the killing of Shireen Abu Akleh in Jenin in May 2022, in which he examined footage to establish which forces were present at the point of fire; the attempted assassination of Donald Trump in Pennsylvania in July 2024; ship-tracking work on unauthorised oil shipments, including the "ghost fleet" moving oil to and from Venezuela; and a 2026 investigation that found the United States had attacked a boat in the Caribbean using an aircraft painted to resemble a civilian plane. In February 2022 he identified footage aired by Newsmax as a mirrored version of a 2020 video from Syria, rather than of the invasion of Ukraine as the channel had claimed.

From 2026 much of his work concerned civilian casualties of American and Israeli air strikes on Iran, including strikes on a school and a sports hall in February 2026 and the use of a new missile that killed 21 civilians in a residential area. In interviews he has described the psychological toll of repeatedly reviewing footage of civilian deaths, and the trauma therapy the Times provides to the team.

In September 2024 Triebert was promoted to senior video journalist. By early 2026 he had worked on more than sixty projects at the Times.

== Teaching ==
Triebert has taught open-source methods since his time at Bellingcat. He was the Ferris Professor of Journalism and a visiting lecturer in the Humanities Council at Princeton University in the spring of 2024, and is a visiting professor in the European Interdisciplinary Studies Department at the College of Europe in Natolin.

== Awards and recognition ==
- 2017: European Press Prize, Innovation Award, for "The Turkish Coup through the Eyes of its Plotters"
- 2019: Alumnus of the Year, University of Groningen
- 2020: Pulitzer Prize for International Reporting, shared with the staff of The New York Times
- 2022: Pulitzer Prize for International Reporting, shared, for "The Civilian Casualty Files"

Investigations he contributed to have also received two George Polk Awards, three Overseas Press Club awards, an Investigative Reporters and Editors award, a World Press Photo award and a Peabody Award.

== Personal life ==
Triebert has lived in Brooklyn, New York, since 2019. His father died of a heart attack in January 2022, at the age of 73. He is a keen cyclist and has said that physical exercise helps him process the material he reviews at work.
