= Bellingcat =

Investigative journalism group

- Website type: Investigative journalism
- Available in: English; Russian; French; Spanish; Ukrainian
- Headquarters: Amsterdam, Netherlands
- Owners: Stichting Bellingcat formerly: Brown Moses Media Ltd.
- Creator: Eliot Higgins
- Website: bellingcat.com; bellcatmbguthn3age23lrbseln2lryzv3mt7whis7ktjw4qrestbzad.onion ^{(Accessing link help)}
- Launched: 2014; 12 years ago

Bellingcat is a Netherlands-based investigative journalism group that specialises in fact-checking and open-source intelligence (OSINT). It was founded by British citizen journalist and former blogger Eliot Higgins in July 2014.

Bellingcat publishes the findings of both professional and citizen journalist investigations into war zones, human rights abuses, and the criminal underworld. The site's contributors also publish guides to their techniques, as well as case studies. In 2025, Bellingcat expanded operations to the United States.

Bellingcat began as an investigation into the use of weapons in the Syrian civil war. Its reports on the Russo-Ukrainian War (including the downing of Malaysia Airlines Flight 17), the El Junquito raid, the Yemeni Civil War, the poisoning of Alexei Navalny, the poisoning of Sergei and Yulia Skripal, and the killing of civilians by the Cameroon Armed Forces have attracted international attention.

== Name ==
The name derives from the idiom "belling the cat", which comes from a medieval fable about mice who discuss how to make a cat harmless. One mouse suggests hooking a bell around the cat's neck, making it unable to move without being heard. All the mice support the idea, but none are willing to do it.

== History ==
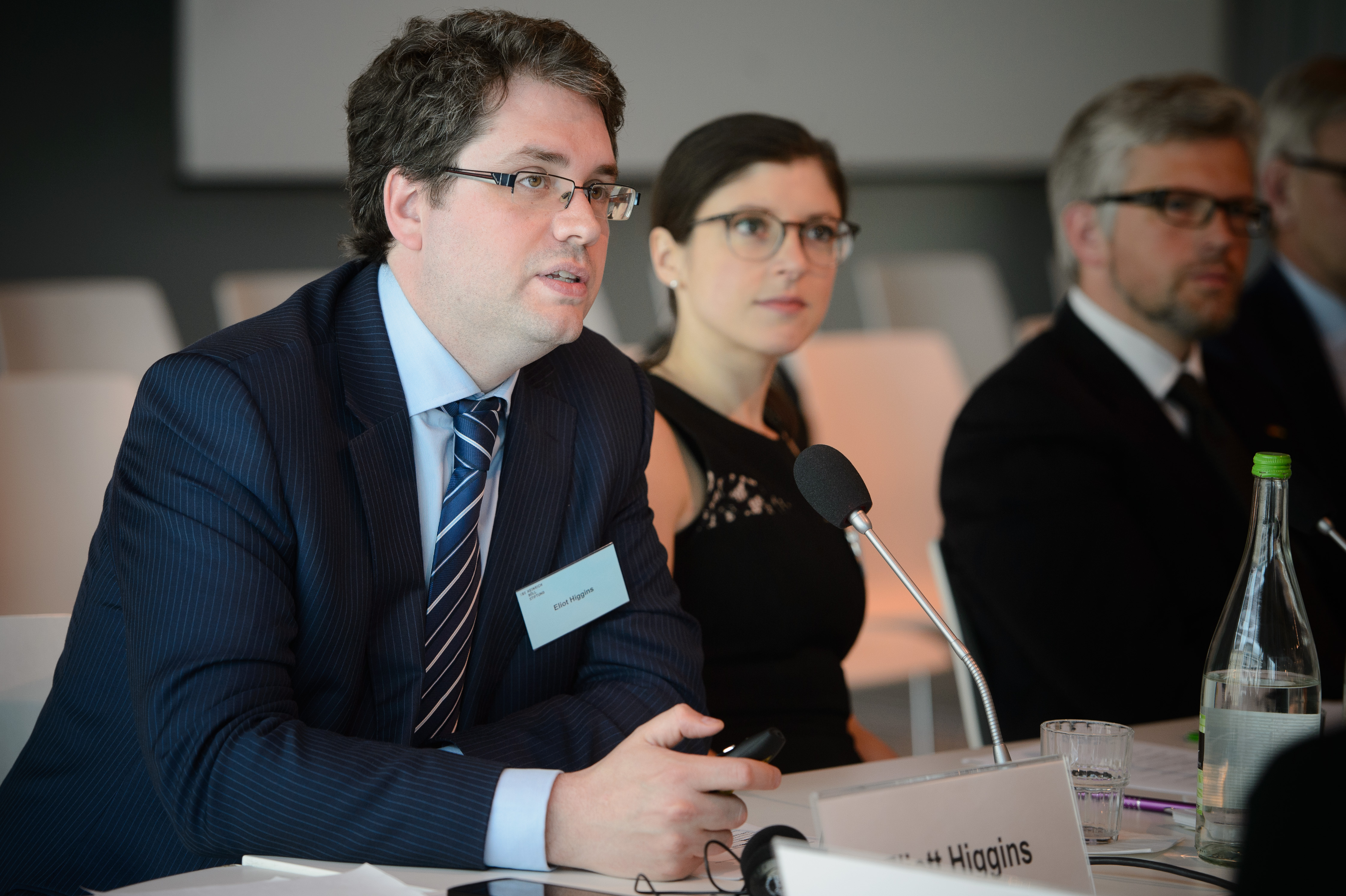
Eliot Higgins and Alina Polyakova (Atlantic Council Associate Director), presenting "Hiding in Plain Sight"; Andrij Melnyk (Ukraine Ambassador to Germany), at "Russian Disinformation in the 21st Century" Conference, Berlin, 2015

Eliot Higgins's interest in OSINT began in 2011, when he was arguing in comments of The Guardian and found out that it is possible to verify videos with satellite imagery. In March 2012, he started a blog under the pseudonym "Brown Moses", named after a song by Frank Zappa, through which he published his research into video footage of the Syrian Civil War. He looked at hundreds of short clips on the Internet, localised them, and examined details of the weapons used. As a result, Higgins demonstrated that the Syrian regime was using cluster munitions and chemical weapons. In 2013, Higgins linked the Ghouta chemical attack to Bashar al-Assad.

Bellingcat's first major investigation, done mainly by volunteers without external funding, concerned the downing of Malaysia Airlines Flight 17 (MH17) in 2014. Their conclusion that Russia was responsible was later confirmed by the Dutch-led international joint investigation team (JIT), which stated in its 25 May 2018 report that the Russian military had shot down the aircraft using a Buk missile. In other investigations using Google Earth, volunteer investigators working with Bellingcat said that they had discovered the coordinates of an Islamic State training camp, as well as the site where an American journalist was killed.

Since 2018, the Bellingcat website has been operated by the Dutch Stichting Bellingcat. meaning "Bellingcat Foundation" in English. The organisation publishes guides on how to analyse data and create reports. Examples include "How to Scrape Interactive Geospatial Data" and "How to Identify Burnt Villages by Satellite Imagery".

As of 2019, the organisation had sixteen full-time staff plus Higgins, and at least 60 contributors. Its office was previously located in Leicester; in 2018, Bellingcat shifted its main office to Amsterdam as a result of the impending Brexit and concerns over staff recruitment and mobility. Since 2021, Bellingcat has maintained a presence in a new Investigative Commons centre in Berlin, Germany.

=== Funding and support ===
Higgins launched the beta version of the Bellingcat platform on 14 July 2014. He raised £50,000 of private donations in the following month through the crowdfunding platform Kickstarter, performing additional crowdfunding in 2017. Half of Bellingcat's funding comes from grants and donations; the remainder is generated by running workshops training people in the art of open-source investigation.

Bellingcat has received grants from Civitates-EU, Porticus the Brenninkmeijer family philanthropy, Adessium Foundation, National Endowment for Democracy (NED), PAX for Peace, the Dutch Postcode Lottery, the Digital News Initiative, Zandstorm CV and Sigrid Rausing Trust. Higgins has said much of the grant money does not directly fund investigations and is used for support services such as document translations and training. Higgins told Polygraph.info that grants from the NED and OSF pay for Bellingcat programmes to help journalists and researchers in their investigations. He said that most "funding from grants covers stuff that isn't related to investigating anything Russia related."

Bellingcat received a €500,000 cash prize from the Nationale Postcode Loterij of The Netherlands; it used these funds to open a new office in The Hague in 2019.

The Bellingcat website noted it receives financial contributions from various companies as well as special discounts and in-kind donations such as software access and platform resources.

== Notable cases ==
=== MH17 ===
Route of Malaysia Airlines Flight 17 on 17 July 2014 from Amsterdam to Kuala Lumpur.

On 17 July 2014 Malaysia Airlines Flight 17, a passenger flight from Amsterdam to Kuala Lumpur, was shot down while flying over eastern Ukraine. All 283 passengers and 15 crew members died after the Boeing 777 was hit by a burst of "high-energy objects".

In a press conference, Russian officials said Ukrainian forces had destroyed the flight and presented radar data, expert testimony and a satellite image. The radar data that showed another aircraft in the vicinity of MH17 was debunked as falling debris from MH17 by experts.

A man claiming to be a Spanish air traffic controller in Kyiv stated in interviews that two Ukrainian fighter jets followed the Malaysian plane. The Spanish embassy later said that there was no Spanish air traffic controller at either of Kyiv's airports. The satellite image showed an aircraft firing on the airliner but Bellingcat exposed the photo as a composite of Google images, with the Malaysian airline logo even being misplaced.

On 9 November 2014, the Bellingcat MH17 investigation team published a report titled "MH17: Source of the Separatists' Buk". Based on evidence from open sources, primarily social media, the report links a Buk missile launcher that was filmed and photographed in eastern Ukraine on 17 July to the downing of the MH17 flight. The report, which included photographs and maps, details the movements of the Buk in eastern Ukraine on 17 July, evidence that the Buk originated from the 53rd Anti-Aircraft Rocket Brigade in Kursk, Russia, along with a convoy headed towards the Ukrainian border, and the activity of the vehicles seen in the same convoy after 17 July.

The Dutch-led international joint investigation team later made similar findings. The head of the Netherlands' National Crime Squad said they officially concluded that the missile that shot down MH17 "is from the 53rd anti-aircraft missile brigade from Kursk in the Russian Federation".

In June 2015, Bellingcat published evidence that Russia had used Adobe Photoshop to manipulate satellite images of the MH17 disaster. Image forensics expert Jens Kriese of Germany said that Bellingcat's report used invalid methods to reach its conclusion. In a follow-up report, Bellingcat published crowdfunded satellite imagery and further analysis that supported their claim.

A December 2017 article published by Bellingcat cited a quote from the 2017 British Intelligence and Security Committee report in which a British Secret Intelligence Service (SIS) source had stated "we know beyond any reasonable doubt that the Russian military supplied and subsequently recovered the missile launcher" which shot down MH17.

In July 2019, Bellingcat released a six part podcast series, produced by Novel Audio, taking an in-depth look at their investigation. An additional two episodes were released in July 2020.

=== Russo-Ukrainian War ===
On 21 December 2016, Bellingcat published a report which analysed cross-border Russian artillery attacks against Ukrainian government troops and in support of pro-Russian separatists in the summer of 2014.

During the full-scale Russian invasion of Ukraine that was started in February 2022, Bellingcat wrote about several findings of cluster munitions in Ukraine. The organisation also collects evidence of war crimes against civilians in Ukraine. In particular, it includes information about the airstrike of the Drama Theater and maternity hospital in Mariupol. Bellingcat's website maintains a page that contains information on incidents that have the potential to cause harm to civilians in Ukraine.

On 26 December 2022, it became known that Bellingcat's lead Russia investigator Christo Grozev was placed on Russia's most wanted list.

=== Syrian Civil War ===
ISIL (grey) territory change 2014–2016

Beginning in March 2011 after political protests turned violent, the Syrian Civil War has been an ongoing conflict between the Syrian Arab Republic, Syrian Opposition, Islamic State of Iraq and the Levant, and other combatants. Bellingcat reports primarily analyse the factions at war, their weapons and armour, and news that would normally go unreported by the mainstream media. Bellingcat utilises a network of contributors who specialise in open source and social media investigation, and creates guides and case studies so others may learn to do the same.

In April 2014, Bellingcat published evidence of chemical weapons being used on Syrian civilians, including children. Collecting video footage from local sources which apparently showed parts of chlorine cylinders, Higgins said that while the contents of the cylinders could not be verified "the injuries depicted in the videos all appear to be consistent with chemical exposure".

In June 2016, Bellingcat published an article showing that cluster munitions were being used against the New Syrian Army. Bellingcat provided photographic evidence from first-hand sources that the munitions were identical to those used by the Russian military.

In February 2017, Bellingcat published an article detailing how rudimentary drones were being used by ISIL to drop explosives onto opposition targets. Using footage from Twitter and other social media platforms, it was found that the drones were dropping modified 40 mm grenades.

In September 2016, Bellingcat released a fact-checking article in response to Russia denying the bombing of hospitals in Syria. The article analysed footage from YouTube and images from Facebook, cross-referencing them with areas confirmed to have been attacked by Russian forces. The article reported that the hospital in question was within the area under Russian attack, although Russia denies these claims.

In March 2017, Bellingcat published an investigative report on the bombing of a mosque in Aleppo that killed up to 49 civilians. The article included photographs of the remnants of the bomb used, and showed that the piece was identical to that of similar bombs used by the US military.

In 2019 and 2020, Bellingcat published reports on the OPCW findings on the Douma chemical attack, which took place in spring 2018.

=== El Junquito raid ===
In May 2018, in partnership with Forensic Architecture and Venezuelan journalists, Bellingcat collected, timed, and located nearly 70 pieces of evidence related to the El Junquito raid, including videos, photographs, leaked audio of police radio communications and official statements, asking for more material to determine if rebel police officer Óscar Pérez and his companions were victims of extrajudicial killings.

=== Yemeni Civil War ===
Bellingcat published that in the 2018 Hajjah Governorate airstrike by the Saudi Arabian–led coalition the bomb was made by the American company Raytheon.

In November 2018, Bellingcat published the results of an investigation on Houthi broadcasts through their affiliated Almasirah news channel concerning missile attacks targeted against two airports in the United Arab Emirates, Abu Dhabi International Airport and Dubai International Airport. The investigation report concluded that "It is highly likely that a Houthi-led drone attack did not take place in Abu Dhabi or Dubai". According to the report, the claims of the attacks constituted a propaganda effort and followed "propaganda pattern" claims by the Houthi leaders.

=== Skripal poisoning ===
Following RT's interview with the suspects of the 4 March 2018 Sergei Skripal poisoning case, Bellingcat published the suspects' passport data showing inconsistencies in the official story, and possible links to the Russian secret service. The Russian foreign ministry rejected the report, stating Bellingcat had ties to Western intelligence. It noted Bellingcat's access to a not publicly available Russian database. Two men had been seen and pinpointed as the likely perpetrators of the attack. Bellingcat identified them as decorated GRU colonel Anatoliy Chepiga and Alexander Mishkin, also a GRU colonel.

In June 2019 Bellingcat reported that major-general Denis Sergeyev had travelled to London as "Sergei Fedotov", and appeared to have commanded the operation, making and receiving many telephone calls with a single Russian "ghost phone" without an IMEI. Bellingcat analysed position data from Sergeyev's phone to trace his movements in London, following its successfully gaining access to travel, passport, and motoring databases for the suspects.

A report in The Guardian stated that "Bellingcat has frequently sparred with Russian military and diplomatic officials, who have claimed without evidence that Bellingcat fabricates evidence and is a front for foreign intelligence services." Russian media have alleged Bellingcat is funded by the U.S. government to undermine Russia and other NATO adversaries.

=== Christchurch mosque shootings ===
Following the Christchurch mosque shootings of 15 March 2019, Bellingcat published what the Columbia Journalism Review referred to as "a comprehensive and contextualized report on the motives and movements of the Christchurch killer". In an online posting, Brenton Tarrant repeats a variety of "white genocide" talking points, and says his murder of several dozen Muslims is because they are "invaders" outbreeding the white race. Robert Evans refers to the manifesto as shitposting, defined as "the act of throwing out huge amounts of content, most of it ironic, low-quality trolling, for the purpose of provoking an emotional reaction in less Internet-savvy viewers".

=== Cameroon ===
Bellingcat assisted the BBC's Africa Eye investigation into the killing of two women and their children by members of the Cameroonian Armed Forces. This followed the appearance of a video on social media in July 2018, initially dismissed as "fake news" by the government of Cameroon before it later acknowledged seven soldiers had been arrested for the massacre. As a result of this investigation, the US withdrew $17 million in funding for the Cameroonian Armed Forces and the European Parliament passed a resolution condemning "torture, forced disappearances, extrajudicial killings perpetrated by governmental forces".

=== PS752 ===
After Ukraine International Airlines Flight 752 crashed shortly after take-off from Tehran Imam Khomeini International Airport in Iran on 8 January 2020, Bellingcat analysed a video obtained by The New York Times, and geo-located the source of the video to a residential area in Parand, a suburb west of the airport.

=== 2020 Nagorno-Karabakh war ===
On 15 October 2020, a video surfaced of two captured Armenians being executed by Azerbaijani soldiers. Bellingcat's analysis concluded the footage was genuine and that both victims were Armenian combatants captured by Azerbaijani forces between 9 and 15 October 2020.

=== Poisoning of Alexei Navalny and others ===
In December 2020, Bellingcat published an investigation detailing how the Russian Federal Security Service (FSB) unit specialised in the use of chemical agents had been tailing opposition leader Alexei Navalny since the moment he announced his plans in 2017 to run in presidential elections, and had agents near his location Tomsk in Siberia when he was poisoned with the military-type Novichok nerve agent in August 2020. They also suggested similar patterns in the actions of the same undercover agents during an earlier visit by Navalny and his wife to Kaliningrad, when she fell ill with symptoms similar to those of his later poisoning. Navalny's assessment is that in Kaliningrad the agents had tried to poison him, but his wife received the Novichok by mistake. The investigation was published on 14 December, revealing the names of both the direct perpetrators of the poisoning and the assassination attempt from the FSB.

The 2022 documentary film Navalny features Bulgarian Bellingcat journalist Christo Grozev uncovering the details of a plot that indicates the involvement of Putin.

According to later investigations, the same team of FSB officers has poisoned several other people in Russia, including opposition politician Vladimir Kara-Murza and writer and poet Dmitry Bykov.

=== Tigray War ===
During the Tigray War that started in November 2020 in the Tigray Region of Ethiopia, Bellingcat, together with BBC News Africa Eye and Newsy, published a geolocation analysis of five videos of what appeared to be an extrajudicial execution of 15–73 Tigrayans by soldiers of the Ethiopian National Defense Force speaking Amharic, one of the main national languages. The victims were thrown off the edge of an escarpment after being shot. The date appeared to be mid-January 2021 and the location was found by Bellingcat and the other investigators to be near the village of Mahbere Dego, about 15 kilometres (9.3 mi) south of Aksum, where the Aksum massacre, one of the main massacres of the Tigray War, had earlier been carried out by the Eritrean Defence Forces, mainly during 28–29 November 2020.

=== West Papua independence movement ===
Bellingcat reported on an information operation in Indonesia targeting the West Papuan independence movement with pro-Indonesian government content. BBC journalist Benjamin Strick wrote that "The campaign, fuelled by a network of bot accounts on Twitter, expands to Instagram, Facebook and YouTube." In April 2020, Twitter removed propaganda accounts linked to the government of Indonesia.

=== January 6 United States Capitol attack ===
Bellingcat has also reported on the attack on the United States Capitol by Trump supporters of 6 January 2021, as well as the fatal shooting of Ashli Babbitt, who took part in the attack. It has reported on Babbitt and the influence of QAnon and other conspiracy theories, which they liken to the process of radicalisation. Bellingcat also reported on Riley Williams, a participant of the January 6 Capitol attack who was responsible for stealing the laptop of Nancy Pelosi. It uncovered videos of Riley doing Nazi salutes, as well as video of her praising Adolf Hitler. 6 Bellingcat researchers took part in her investigation, Bellingcat was also the first group to identify Williams after the attack.

=== Investigation of Maria Adela ===
In 2021, Bellingcat launched an investigation of Maria Adela Kuhfeldt Rivera, a supposed jewellery designer from Peru. In 2005, Maria Adela had filed an application to be inscribed into the country's citizen database. Due to lack of proof of actual birth in Peru, the application was denied and her identity was marked as unknown. Bellingcat interviewed various acquaintances of Maria, who told them her cover identity: a girl left behind by her mother on a holiday to the Soviet Union for the 1980 Summer Olympics. Those living near to her childhood address in Moscow report never having heard of her. In addition to this, researchers noticed a similarity between Maria Adela's Russian passport and that of other GRU agents. As an executive member of the Lions Club in Naples, she came in contact with many officers and officials from NATO. With the use of facial recognition software, Maria Adela was identified as Olga Kolobova, a spy of the GRU.

== Reception ==
Kristyan Benedict, an Amnesty International campaign manager, told The New Yorker in 2013 that many organisations had analysts but that Higgins was faster than many established investigation teams.

According to the i newspaper, Bellingcat is notable for its transparency, as Bellingcat investigative reports describe "how they found out the story and which techniques they used".

As reported in Foreign Policy, one of the unintended benefits of open-source intelligence outlets, such as Bellingcat (and others), is that it gives the US intelligence community freedom to discuss Russian intelligence operations publicly without revealing their own sources or methods.

On 8 October 2021, Bellingcat was designated as a "foreign agent" in Russia. On 15 July 2022, it was banned in Russia alongside its partner The Insider, which is headquartered in Latvia. Following this restriction, any Russian citizen who aids Bellingcat or The Insider may face criminal prosecution; they would also be restricted from citing their publications. The office of the Prosecutor-General of Russia said that the outlets were banned due to "posing a threat to the security of the Russian Federation." Higgins responded to the ban by stating, "Bellingcat has no legal, financial or staff presence (in Russia), so it's unclear how Russia expects to enforce this." In February 2023, it was reported that Bulgarian investigative journalist and Bellingcat director Christo Grozev chose to live in exile from his home in Austria due to the alleged threat posed to him by the Russian security services and collaborators in Vienna.

In the New York Review of Books, Muhammad Idrees Ahmad, digital journalism lecturer at the University of Stirling, states that Bellingcat has had an influence on how established journalism outlets and research institutions conduct open-source investigations:

Bellingcat's successes have encouraged investment in open-source research capability by much larger and long-established media institutions (such as The New York Times Visual Investigations), human rights organisations (Amnesty's Digital Verification Corps; Human Rights Watch's soon-to-be-launched OSINT unit), think tanks (the Atlantic Council's DFR Lab), and academic institutions (Berkeley's Human Rights Investigations Lab).

Mentioning "large gaps in foreign coverage" due to reduced newsroom budgets, Ahmad says that in today's digital context, newsrooms have become convinced that "sending journalists abroad is a fool's errand".

Columbia University's Tow Center for Digital Journalism, the Poynter Institute, and other scholars of journalism have recommended Bellingcat guides on how to conduct open-source investigations to journalists and to journalism students.

According to Foreign Policy, the work of Bellingcat was valuable to the United States Intelligence Community because Bellingcat's "transparency about their investigative process also makes it difficult to refute and harder for Russia to dodge responsibility". For U.S. intelligence, there has always been a dilemma between delineating Russian responsibility for wrongdoing while not jeopardising sources and methods; Bellingcat's transparent process makes it unnecessary for U.S. intelligence to delineate Russian wrongdoing. Daniel Hoffman, a former CIA chief of station, stated that "The greatest value of Bellingcat is that we can then go to the Russians and then say, there you go." Daniel Fried, a retired diplomat who served as Assistant Secretary of State for European and Eurasian Affairs under former President George W. Bush, said that "The advantage of having Bellingcat doing it is that you don't have to have a sources-and-methods debate within your government."

=== Awards ===
In 2015, Eliot Higgins and Bellingcat received the special prize of the Hanns-Joachim-Friedrichs-Award.

In 2017, Bellingcat-member Christiaan Triebert won the European Press Prize Innovation Award for a detailed reconstruction of the 2016 Turkish coup d'état attempt in a Bellingcat article titled The Turkish Coup through the Eyes of its Plotters.

In 2018, Bellingcat was awarded the Golden Nica of Ars Electronica Prize for Digital Communities.

In 2019, Christo Grozev and his team received the Investigative Reporting Award from the European Press Prize for identifying the two men who allegedly poisoned Sergei and Yulia Skripal.

In 2019, Bellingcat and Newsy received Scripps Howard Award for Innovation in investigative journalism that sheds light on international conflict.

In 2019, Bellingcat received London Press Club Prize for Digital Journalist of the Year.

In 2019, Bellingcat podcast on Malaysia Airlines Flight 17 was awarded Political Studies Association Award for Political Podcast of the Year.

In 2019, Bellingcat received the Machiavelli Prize from the Machiavelli Foundation in the Netherlands.

In 2020, Bellingcat and Newsy were nominated for News & Documentary Emmy Award in the category Outstanding New Approaches: Current News.

In 2020, Bellingcat won Audio and Radio Industry Awards Bronze for Best Factual Series and Silver for Best Independent Podcast for Malaysia Airlines Flight 17 podcast.

In 2021, The Bellingcat Podcast - Series 2 won the Radio and Podcasts award at the 2021 Amnesty Media Awards.

In 2021 Two Emmy Awards were won by CNN and Bellingcat, Outstanding Investigative Report in a Newscast and Outstanding Research: News regarding the investigation into the Poisoning of Russian Opposition Leader Alexey Navalny.

In 2022, Bellingcat and its executive director Christo Grozev received the ICFJ Innovation in International Reporting Award.

In 2022, Bellingcat was named the International News Media Organisation of the Year.

In 2023, Bellingcat won the WIN WIN Gothenburg Sustainability Award for their innovative methods, which have led to a new generation of investigative journalism.

In 2023, the Anne Jacobsens Memorial Award was awarded to Bellingcat for their unwavering commitment to transparent and reliable journalism.

In 2024, Bellingcat won the Olof Palme Prize.

== Films ==
=== Bellingcat: Truth in a Post-Truth World (2018) ===
In 2018 the documentary film Bellingcat: Truth in a Post-Truth World was released. It explores Bellingcat's investigative journalism work, including the Skripal poisoning and the Malaysia Airlines Flight 17 shootdown.

The film won the International Emmy Award for Documentary in 2019.

=== Navalny (2022) ===
In 2022, Daniel Roher directed Navalny, a documentary about the Russian opposition leader Alexei Navalny, his poisoning and struggle with the authoritarian regime of Vladimir Putin. A joint investigation between Bellingcat and The Insider, in cooperation with Der Spiegel and CNN, has discovered voluminous telecom and travel data that implicates Russia's Federal Security Service in the poisoning of Navalny, ordered by the highest echelons of the Russian government. Christo Grozev, who served as the primary researcher for Bellingcat, is one of the protagonists in the documentary, and the investigation itself is а primary storyline in it.

The film won the Festival Favorite Award and the Audience Award for the U.S. Documentary Competition at the Sundance Film Festival, where it premiered on 25 January 2022. In Britain, the film won the Best Documentary at the 76th BAFTA awards and at the 95th U.S. Academy Awards (2023), it won an Oscar for Best Documentary Feature Film.

== Publications about Bellingcat ==
Elliot Higgins' 2021 book We Are Bellingcat documents the creation and the work of the organisation.

== Bibliography ==
- Higgins, Eliot (19 July 2013). "How I Accidentally Became An Expert On The Syrian Conflict". Sabotage Times. Archived from the original on 23 July 2013.
- Czuperski, Maksymilian; Herbst, John; Higgins, Eliot; Polyakova, Alina; Wilson, Damon (15 October 2015). "Hiding in plain sight: Putin's war in Ukraine". Atlantic Council.
- Higgins, Eliot (26 January 2016). "Piecing together open source evidence from the Syrian Sarin attacks - First Draft Footnotes". First Draft News.
- Higgins, Eliot (2021). We Are Bellingcat: An Intelligence Agency for the People. London: Bloomsbury. ISBN 978-1-5266-1572-5.
