= Death and funeral of Alexei Navalny =

2024 death of a Russian opposition leader

Death of Alexei Navalny
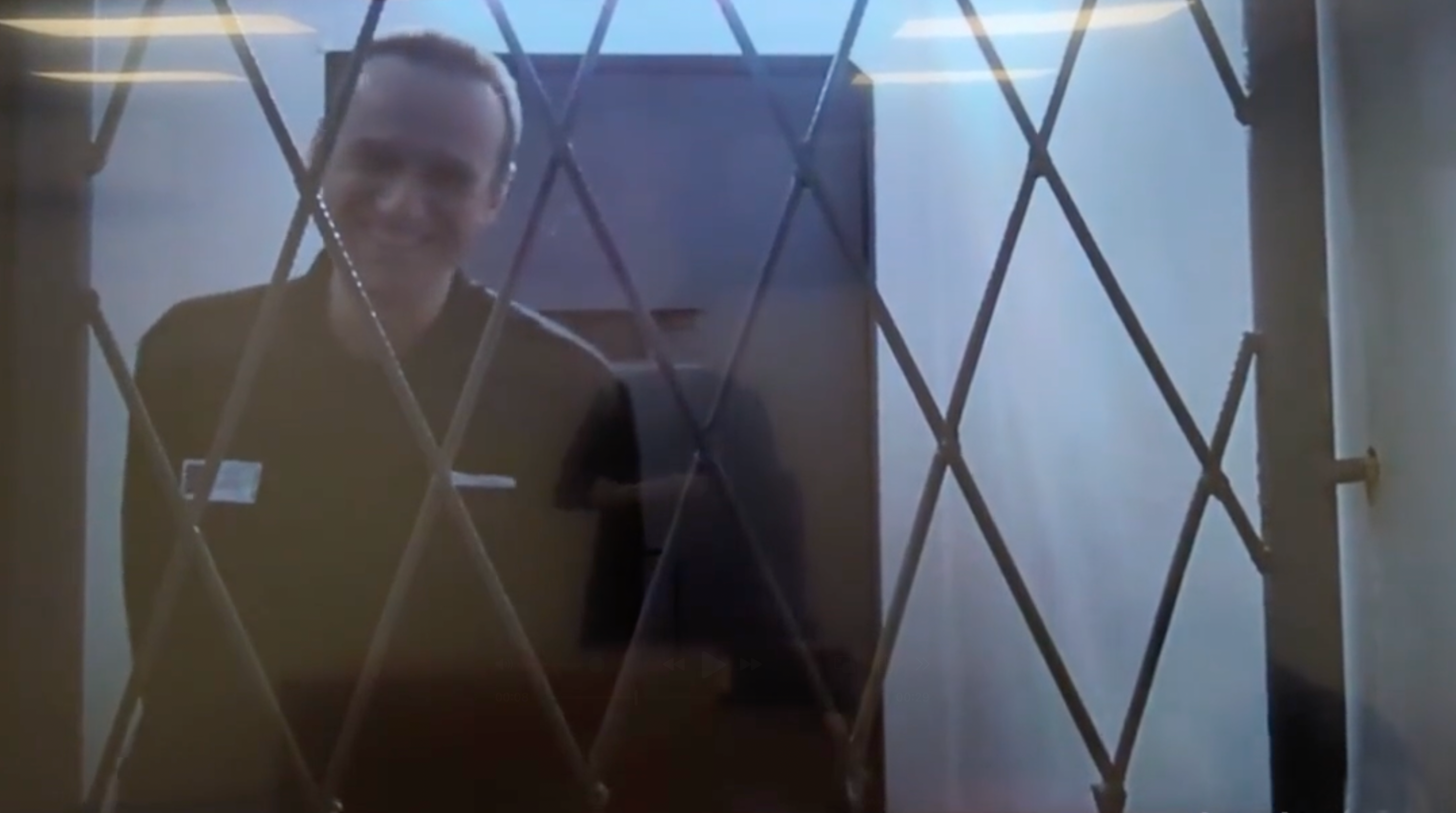
- Navalny's court appearance via video link on 15 February 2024, the day before his death
- Date: 16 February 2024; 2 years ago
- Time: c. 14:17 (YEKT)
- Location: FKU IK-3, Kharp, Yamalo-Nenets Autonomous Okrug, Russia; 66.8196°N 65.7938°E
- Cause: Arrhythmia (per Russian officials); Epibatidine (per several European nations)

Funeral of Alexei Navalny
- Date: 1 March 2024; 2 years ago
- Time: Around 16:45 (MSK)
- Location: Church of the Icon of the Mother of God Soothe My Sorrows, Maryino District, Moscow Borisovskoye сemetery, Brateyevo District, Moscow; 55°39′30.03″N 37°43′22.21″E

On 16 February 2024, at 14:19 Moscow time (11:19 GMT), the Russian Federal Penitentiary Service (FSIN) of the Yamalo-Nenets Autonomous Okrug announced that Russian opposition activist and political prisoner Alexei Navalny died while serving a 19-year prison sentence in FKU IK-3, a corrective colony in the village of Kharp in the Russian Arctic. Navalny's spokeswoman, Kira Yarmysh, confirmed his death the next day and demanded his body be returned to his family as soon as possible. The official cause of death per the Russian government was an episode of high blood pressure brought about by a chronic heart arrythmia, but this diagnosis has been disputed by Navalny's widow Yulia Navalnaya. Navalny was 47 years old when he died.

Navalny's death spurred numerous protests and gatherings in different countries, including Russia, where hundreds of mourners were detained. Western officials and Russian opposition activists held Russian authorities, including President Vladimir Putin, responsible for his death. US intelligence agencies later concluded that Putin likely did not order Navalny's death. Navalny's funeral was held in Moscow on 1 March 2024, at the Church of the Icon of the Mother of God Soothe My Sorrows in the Maryino District. He was buried in the Borisovskoye сemetery in the Brateyevo District.

In February 2026, the United Kingdom, France, Germany, Sweden, and the Netherlands released a joint statement saying that Navalny was killed by epibatidine, a deadly toxin found in poison dart frogs, citing tests on samples from his body that "conclusively" confirmed its presence. According to Sky News, the toxin was likely made in a laboratory.

== Background ==
=== Assassination attempt ===
Alexei Navalny was considered one of the most prominent critics of Russian president Vladimir Putin, having denounced corruption under his regime and unsuccessfully trying to run for president against him in 2018. In 2017, Navalny suffered eye injuries after being assaulted with a green disinfectant by an unknown assailant. In 2020, Navalny was poisoned with a Novichok nerve agent and was evacuated to Germany for medical treatment.

In 2021, before returning to Russia, Navalny took part in the filming of the Oscar-winning documentary Navalny. In the film's final sequence, he urged Russians not to give up if he was killed, saying that "this means that we are unusually strong at this moment, since they decided to kill me".

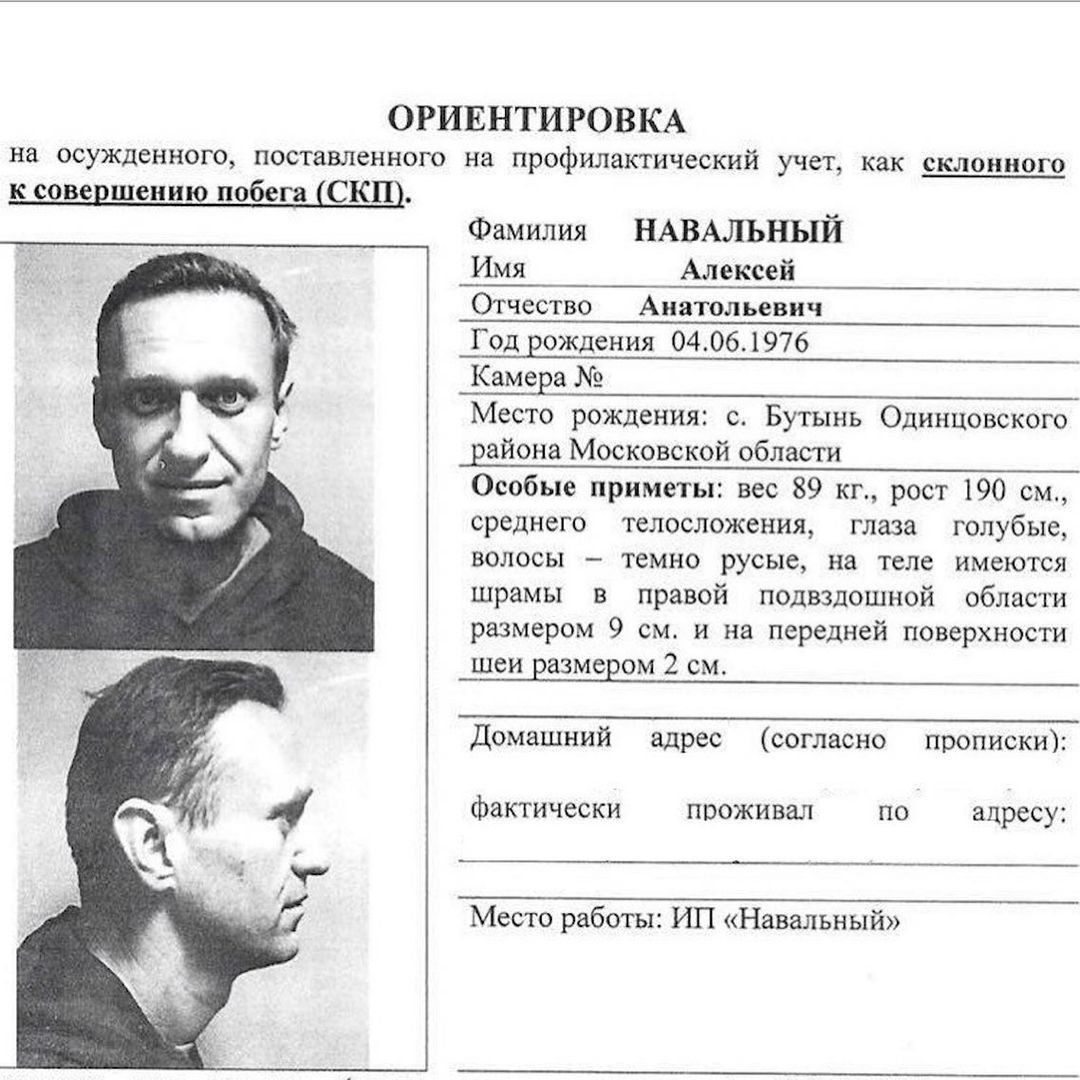
Prison registration card of Alexei Navalny in the Matrosskaya Tishina detention centre, where he was held in early 2021 before his transfer to a penal colony

=== Imprisonment ===
In January 2021, US President Joe Biden warned Putin that Navalny's arrest and possible death would bring "devastating" consequences to Russia. He was imprisoned based on charges of fraud, extremism and violating probation. The European Court of Human Rights ruled on 16 February 2021 that the Russian government should release Navalny immediately, with the court saying that the resolution was made in "regard to the nature and extent of risk to the applicant's life". In December 2020, a series of laws were also passed that gave the Russian Constitution precedence over rulings made by international bodies as well as international treaties. A few days later, a Moscow court rejected Navalny's appeal and upheld his prison sentence, however it reduced his sentence by six weeks after deciding to count his time under house arrest as part of his time served. Another court convicted Navalny on slander charges against a World War II veteran, fining him 850,000 rubles ($11,500).

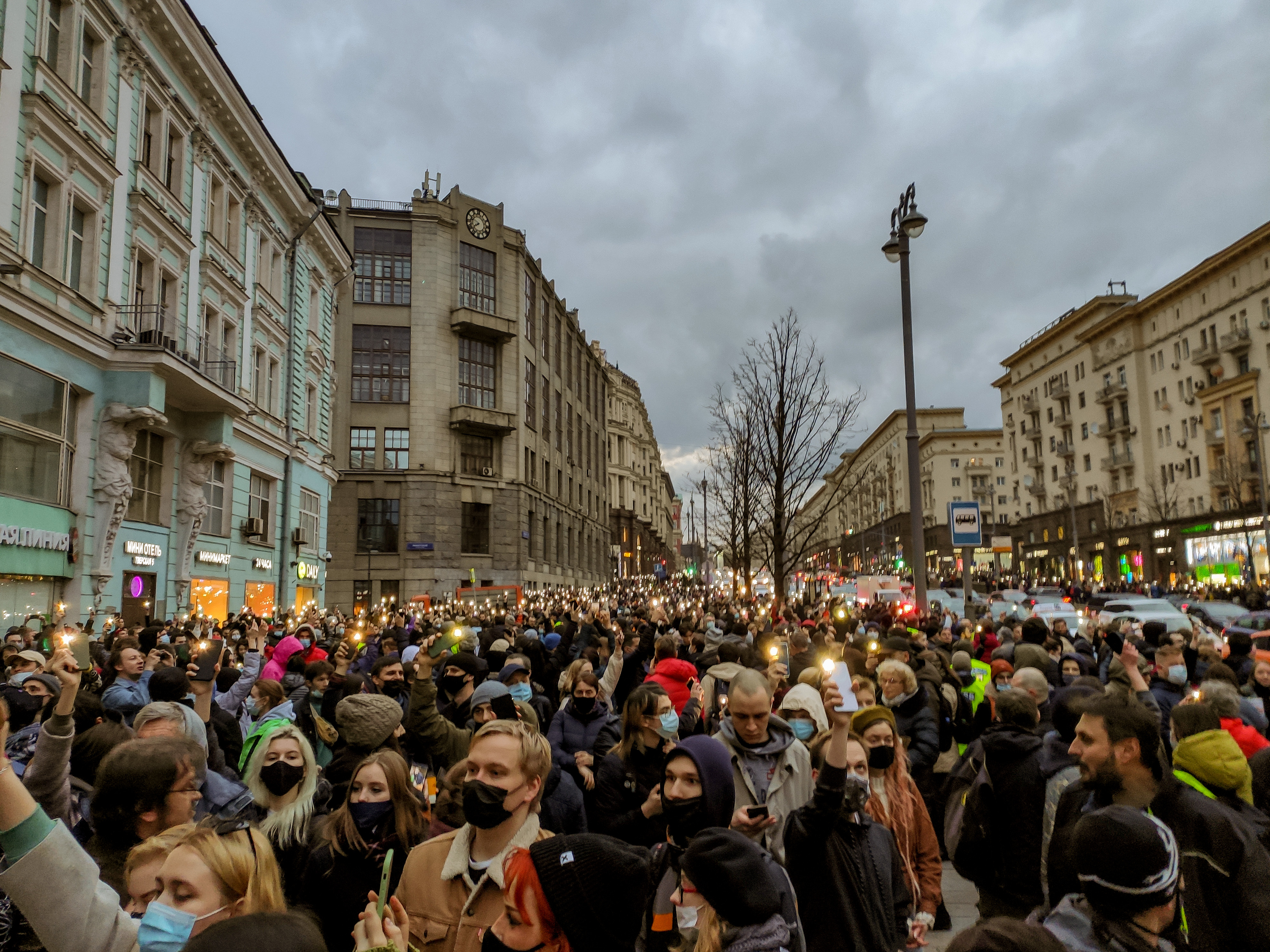
Protest in support of Navalny in Moscow, 21 April 2021

During his imprisonment, Navalny struggled with health issues and did not consistently receive medical care.

A 2.5×3 meter concrete doghouse. Most of the time it is unbearable there because it is cold and damp. Water on the floor. I have a beach version - very hot and almost no air. The window is tiny, because of the thickness of the walls air does not go - even the cobwebs do not move. There is no ventilation. At night you lie there and feel like a fish on the shore. The iron bunk is fastened to the wall. The handle that lowers it is on the outside. At 5 a.m., they take away your mattress and pillow and raise the bunk. At 9 p.m. they lower the bunk again and give you back the mattress. Iron table, iron bench, sink, hole in the floor. There are two cameras under the ceiling.

— Alexei Navalny on the conditions of detention in solitary confinement

In December 2023 he was transferred from a penal colony east of Moscow to the Polar Wolf colony in Kharp, Yamalo-Nenets Autonomous Okrug, in Russia's Far North. The Polar Wolf colony has more harsh conditions, including reported torture of inmates, and according to Novaya Gazeta is reserved for "especially dangerous repeat offenders". On 15 February, the day before his death, he appeared via video link at a court hearing, during which he made jokes and seemed to be in good health. At the time of his death, Navalny was serving a 19-year sentence, and was in solitary confinement for the 27th time, having spent a cumulative 300 days in solitary confinement over the course of his sentence.

== Death ==
On 16 February, the Federal Penitentiary Service department for the Yamalo-Nenets Autonomous Okrug published a statement that Navalny lost consciousness after a walk. He was attended by medical workers from the penal colony and an emergency medical team was called. Referring to a statement by representatives of the Labytnangi City Hospital, several Russian state-owned news agencies reported that an ambulance arrived at the scene in less than seven minutes and performed resuscitation measures for more than half an hour. Navalny was not revived, and he was officially reported dead at 14:17 Yekaterinburg Time with reports of his death first appearing in the media at 16:19 Yekaterinburg Time (14:19 MSK). His death was confirmed the next day by his spokeswoman Kira Yarmysh, citing an official notice delivered to his mother, Lyudmila. Yarmysh also called for his remains to be returned to his family.

An inmate of the Polar Wolf colony noted highly unusual activity at the prison on the evening of 15 February, which seemed to indicate a surprise prison inspection. He stated that the prisoners were locked in their barracks and a search was conducted on the morning of 16 February. The prisoner stated that they were informed about Navalny's death at 10:00, well before the press release on Navalny's death. The prisoner also noted that first aid had only appeared after Navalny was already known to be dead. The prisoner's interpretation of the events was that Navalny had likely died on the evening of 15 February, and that it had been a surprise to prison authorities. According to human rights group Gulagu.net, an official report states that several cameras in the penal colony were inactive on 16 February. Gulagu.net interpreted this as the result of FSB officers arriving at the prison on 14 February and disabling audio and video monitoring equipment. Gulagu.net stated that there were bruises on Navalny's body, which the medical examiner carrying out an autopsy on the body was told to attribute as having occurred post-mortem.

=== Investigation into death and release of remains ===
The Investigative Committee of Russia announced "a set of investigative and operative measures" into Navalny's death. The Polar Wolf penal colony claimed that it had sent Navalny's body to the morgue in Salekhard, but it was not found there. The Investigative Committee of Russia informed the family that the body would be given to them after the cause of death was determined through an investigation; it had previously told them the investigation was complete. The authorities legally can hold his body for up to 30 days. Yarmysh alleged that the Russian authorities were trying to cover up the truth of his death.

According to Novaya Gazeta, the body was first taken to Labytnangi, then to a clinical morgue in Salekhard on the evening of the 16th. His body had bruises consistent with chest compressions, indicating that it was likely attempts were made to resuscitate Navalny. The independent Russian news outlet Mediazona reported that live cam footage recorded a FSIN convoy travelling from Labytnangi to Salekhard on the night of the 16th, and suggested that this convoy was carrying Navalny's body. On the morning of 19 February, Navalny's mother, Lyudmila Navalnaya, and his lawyers attempted to access the morgue where his body is alleged to be located, and were not given access. The Investigative Committee then informed Navalny's team that his remains were sent for a "chemical examination" and would not be returned to the family for another fourteen days. Navalny's wife, Yulia, expressed her belief that authorities were withholding his body while waiting for traces of Novichok to disappear.

On 22 February, Lyudmila Navalnaya released a video message stating that investigators had allowed her to see the body of her son and that she had signed a death certificate that stated that her son had died of natural causes. By law, Navalny's body should have been turned over to his family, but according to Navalnaya, the investigators refused to do so, instead insisting that Navalny be buried in secret or inside the prison grounds if Navalnaya did not agree within several hours. Navalny's remains were finally returned to his mother on 24 February.

On 21 March, a court in Labytnangi rejected a lawsuit filed by Lyudmila Navalnaya accusing authorities of providing inadequate medical care to her son in prison, with Navalny associate Ivan Zhdanov saying that the court ruled that only Alexei Navalny could file the lawsuit, and Yulia Navalnaya saying that the court rejected the lawsuit due to concerns over the release of information regarding his death.

==== Potential cause ====
Alexander Polupan, a doctor who treated Navalny's earlier poisoning, questioned the rapid timing of medical care, noted that a detached blood clot (a possible cause of death claimed by Russian state media) cannot be verified without an autopsy, and said Navalny had no underlying conditions that would put him at risk of a thromboembolism. His mother was told that he had died from "sudden death syndrome" (an umbrella term for different cardiac syndromes that cause cardiac arrest); his lawyer was told that the cause of death was still unclear.

According to official documents obtained by The Insider, an early version of a report prepared by Investigative Committee of Russia mentioned abdominal pain, vomiting, and convulsions as Navalny's symptoms, which were confirmed by medical experts as clearly indicative of poisoning. However, in the final version of the same document all mention of Navalny's abdominal pain, vomiting, and convulsions was removed, while an inventory of objects taken from the scene of Navalny's death still listed "samples of vomit", which according to the document were submitted for examination, despite the fact that neither the fact of the examination nor Navalny's vomiting had ever been officially reported.

In February 2026, the United Kingdom, France, Germany, Sweden, and the Netherlands released a joint statement saying that Navalny was killed by epibatidine, a deadly toxin found in poison dart frogs, citing tests on samples from his body that "conclusively" confirmed its presence. According to Sky News, the toxin was likely made in a laboratory.

=== Official cause ===
On 26 July 2024, the Investigative Committee of Russia concluded that Navalny's death "does not have a criminal nature" and was the result of a "combined disease", which included a number of diagnoses: cholecystitis, pancreatitis, intervertebral hernia and others. The judgement states that the death "has an arrhythmogenic character" and the trigger factor was "a critical increase in blood pressure".

Yulia Navalnaya reacted to the official conclusion of death:

We know very well that when Alexei felt ill, he was taken not to the medical centre, but back to the solitary confinement cell. That he died there, alone. That he was taken to the infirmary unconscious. That in the last minutes before his death he complained of a sharp pain in his stomach.

According to Navalnaya, her husband did not have any heart disease while alive.

=== Culpability ===
On 27 April, The Wall Street Journal reported that US intelligence agencies had concluded that Putin likely did not order Navalny's death. The assessment, which US intelligence says does not absolve Putin of culpability, was shared by the Central Intelligence Agency, the Office of the Director of National Intelligence, and the Department of State. The Journal noted that some European agencies were skeptical of the US assessment, finding it "doubtful that harm could have come to Navalny without the president's prior awareness" in Putin's Russia.

== Funeral ==
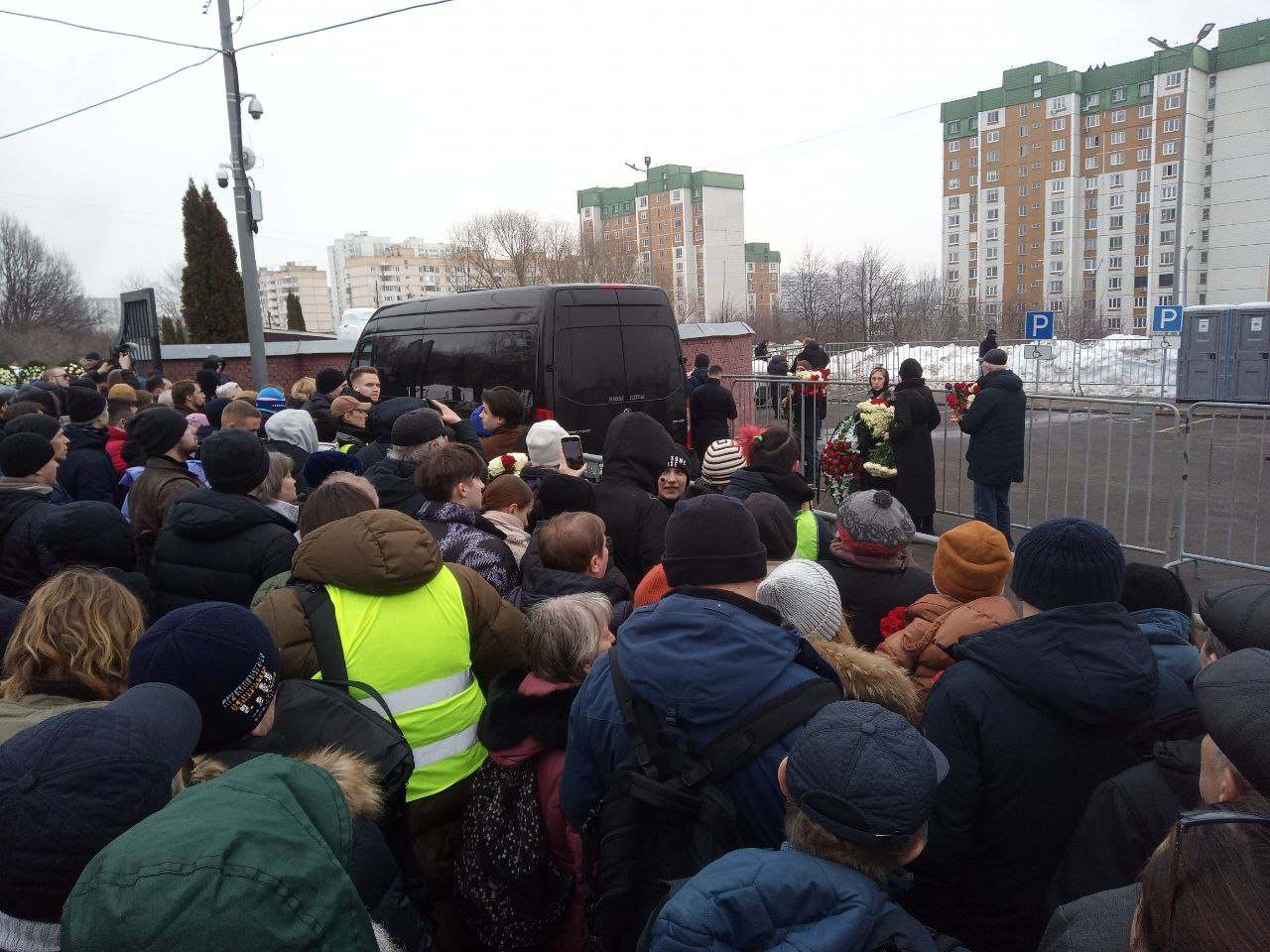
Hearse with Navalny's body on March 1, 2024

On 27 February, Kira Yarmysh said that they were trying to find a place to hold a public memorial for Navalny, adding that most funeral locations they had contacted had refused to allow a ceremony on their premises. On the same day, Vasily Dubkov, one of Navalny's lawyers who accompanied Lyudmila Navalnaya in retrieving her son's remains in Yamalo-Nenets, was reportedly arrested in Moscow on charges of "violating public order". On 28 February, Yarmysh announced that Navalny would be buried in the afternoon of 1 March at the Borisovskoye Cemetery, following a service at the Church of the Icon of the Mother of God Soothe My Sorrows in Moscow's Maryino District, where Navalny previously resided. Ivan Zhdanov, a director of the Anti-Corruption Foundation, said that the funeral had initially been scheduled on 29 February but was moved after no venue agreed to hold it on that day, which coincided with Putin's annual Presidential Address to the Federal Assembly. He added that Navalny's relatives were being pressured by authorities to conduct a "quiet family funeral."

People attending Alexei Navalny's funeral chant his name, March 1, 2024

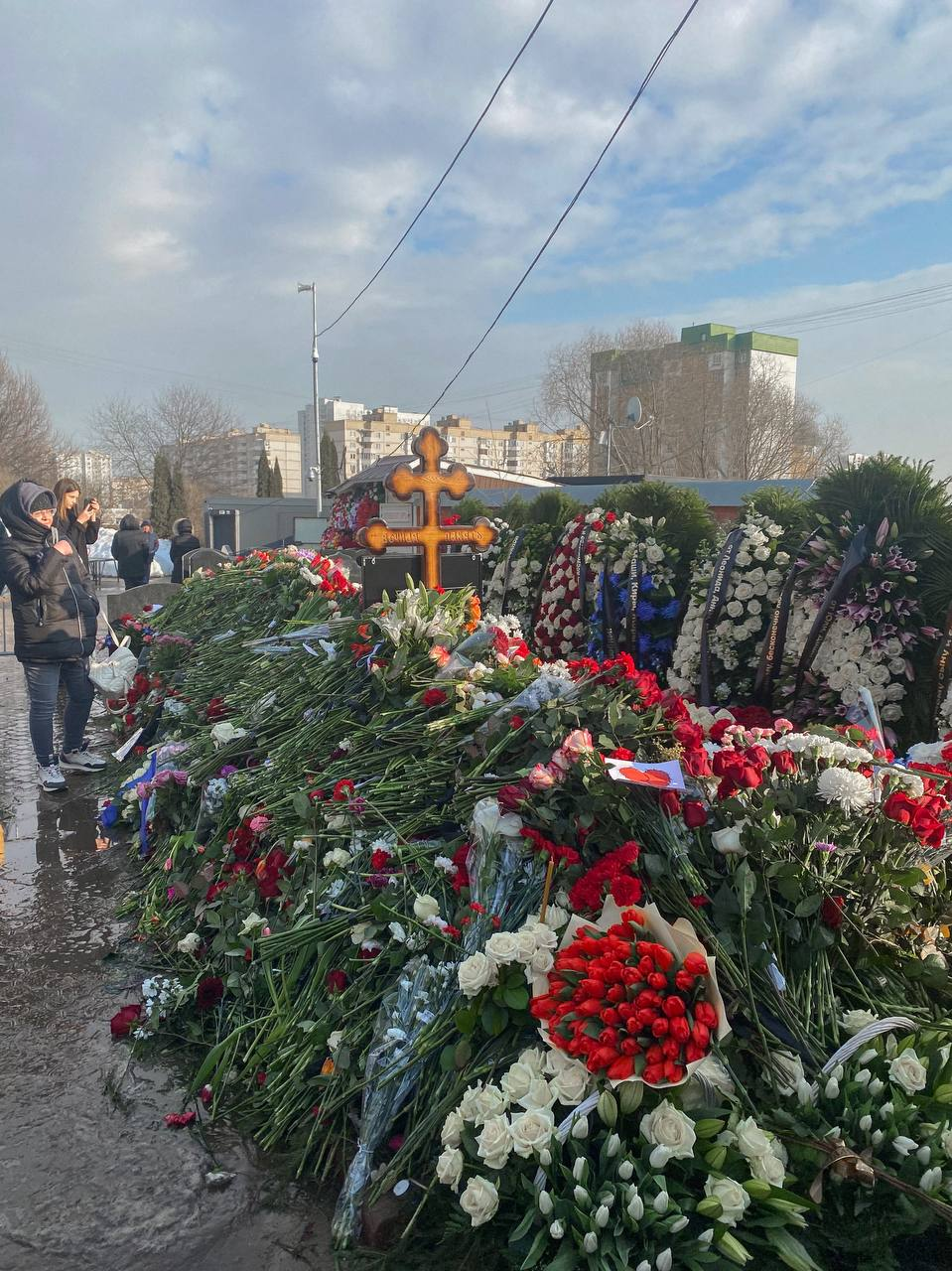
Alexei Navalny's grave, March 3, 2024

Navalny's funeral proceeded on 1 March at the Mother of God Soothe My Sorrows church, and was attended by his parents, US ambassador to Russia Lynne M. Tracy, the ambassadors of Germany and France, several other Western diplomats, disqualified opposition presidential candidates Boris Nadezhdin and Yekaterina Duntsova, and former mayor of Yekaterinburg Yevgeny Roizman. The ceremony, which was streamed live on his YouTube channel, was conducted under a heavy police presence and crowd control barriers were erected around the church. Ivan Zhdanov accused the morgue where Navalny's remains were held of delaying his release, while Yulia Navalnaya accused Putin and Moscow mayor Sergei Sobyanin of trying to block a public funeral. Yarmysh called on Navalny's supporters overseas to lay flowers in his memory at his funeral.

"My Way" by Frank Sinatra and the theme music from Terminator 2: Judgment Day were played as his body was lowered into the ground.

Navalny's associates said that queues for the funeral reached more than a kilometer with thousands in attendance, with some chanting anti-war and anti-Putin slogans, before police closed off the Borisovskoye cemetery at 22:00, six hours after Navalny was laid to rest. The Russian human rights group OVD-Info said that 128 people were arrested in 19 cities across the country for participating in memorial events on his funeral, most of whom were trying to lay flowers at monuments to victims of Soviet repression. Police continued to be deployed around the cemetery on 2 March, when Lyudmila Navalnaya and Yulia Navalnaya's mother Alla Abrosimova visited to lay flowers at Navalny's grave.

A memorial service to mark 40 days since Navalny's death was held on 26 March and was officiated by Dmitry Safronov, a priest who had signed a public petition to return Navalny's remains to his family. He was demoted into a psalm-reader on 23 April by the Russian Orthodox Church and was banned from giving blessings and wearing a cassock for three years and was ordered transferred from his parish.

== Reactions ==
=== Domestic ===
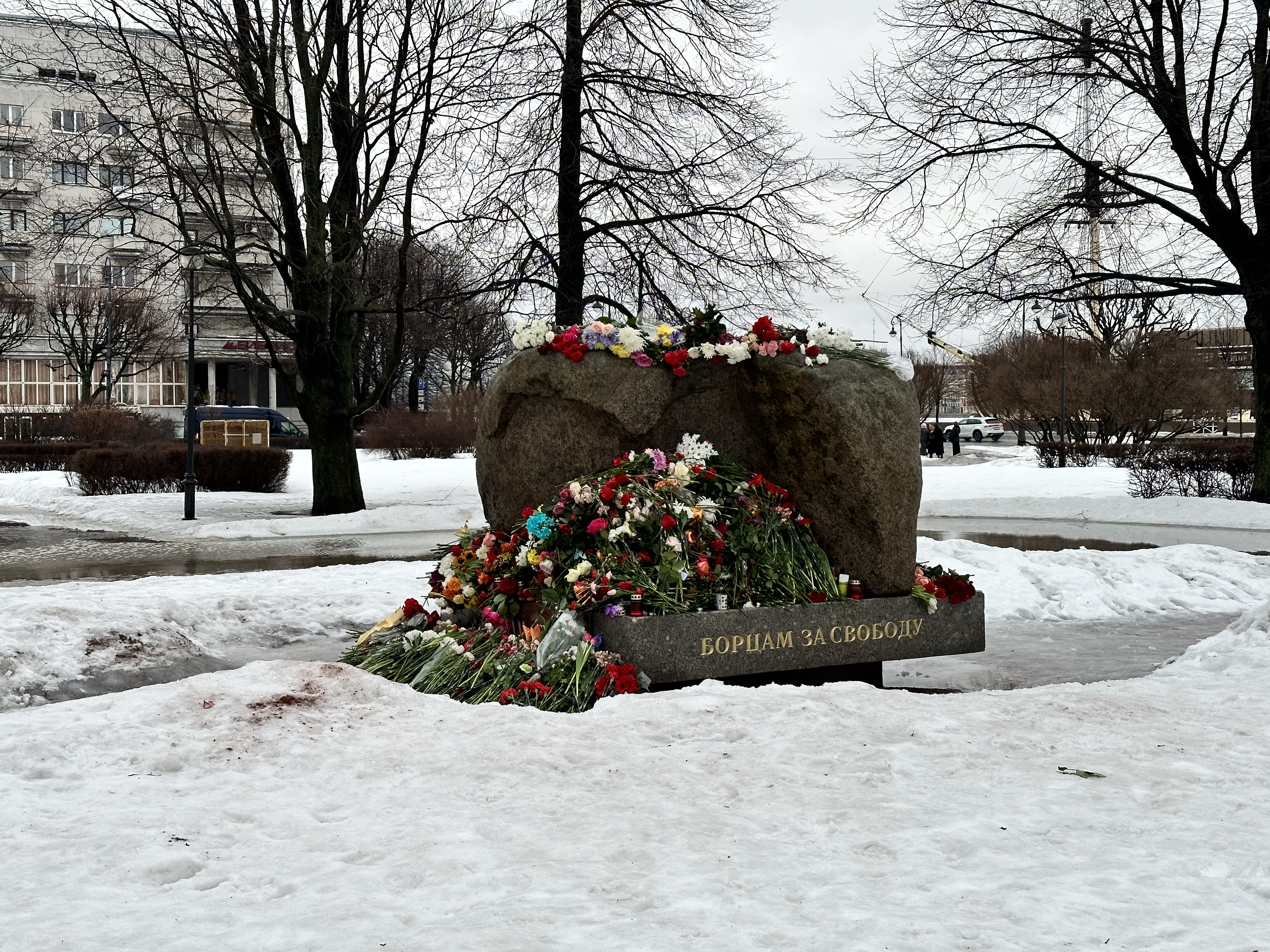
Flowers at the Solovetsky Stone in Saint Petersburg on 17 February 2024

External videos
- Comments by Yulia Navalnaya at the Munich Security Conference, 16 February 2024, C-SPAN

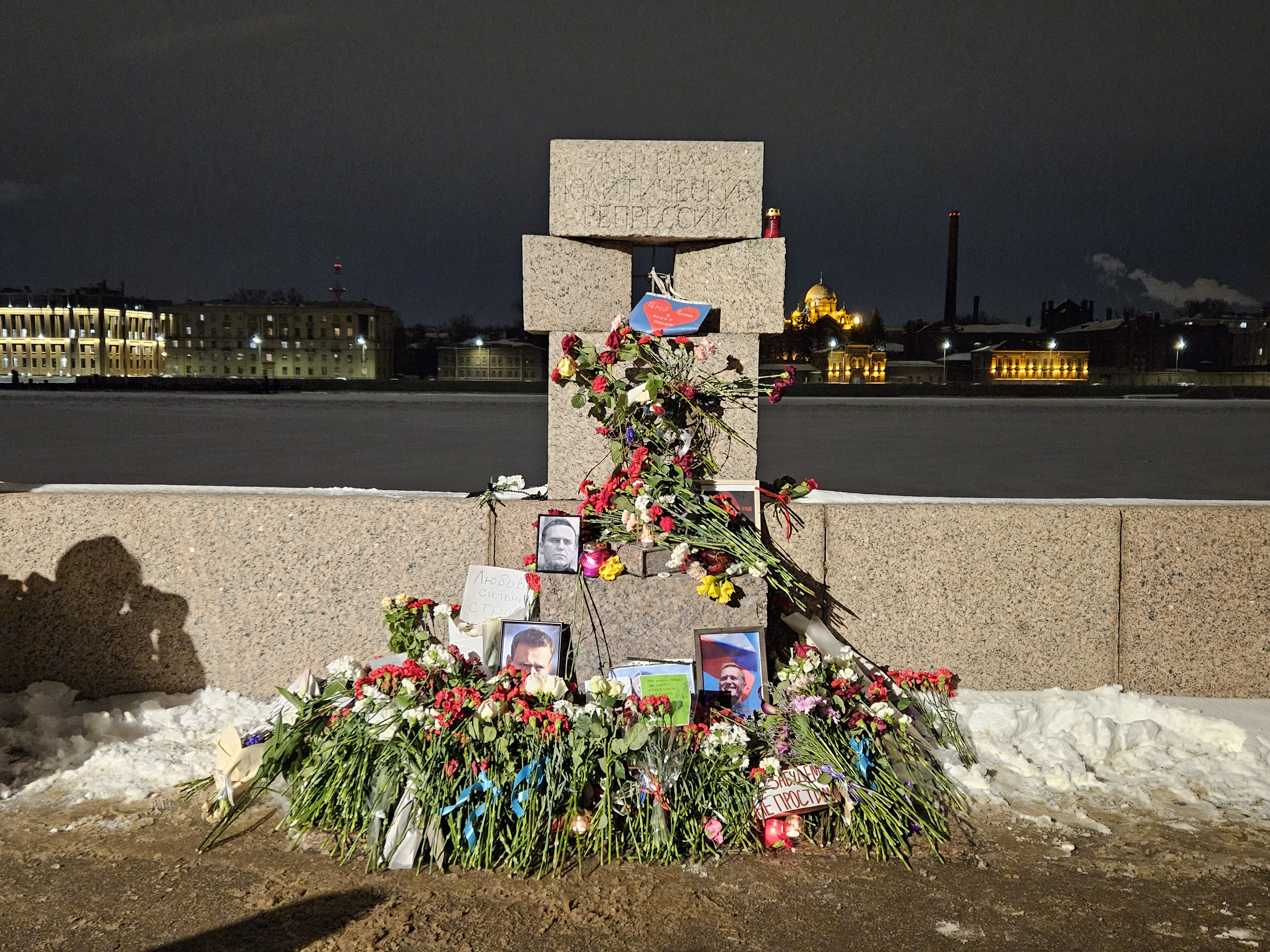
Action in memory of Alexei Navalny at the Memorial to the Victims of Political Repression in St. Petersburg on 16 February 2024

Flowers at the Memorial to the Victims of Political Repression following the death of Navalny

Navalny's widow Yulia Navalnaya said all those responsible for the death of her husband "will be held accountable". In a video recorded 19 February 2024, Yulia announced that she would continue the work her husband had started, and stated "By killing Alexei, Putin killed half of me — half of my heart and half of my soul. But I still have the other half left, and it tells me that I have no right to give up...Fight, and don't give up. I am not afraid, and you should not be afraid either." Navalnaya called for the EU to recognize the results of the 2024 Russian presidential election as illegitimate, stating "A president who assassinated his main political opponent cannot be legitimate by definition."

Navalny's mother, Lyudmila, said she did not "want to hear any words of sympathy", adding that he was "alive, healthy and cheerful" four days prior to his death. Maria Pevchikh, the head of the board of the Anti-Corruption Foundation founded by Navalny, said that he would "live on forever in millions of hearts," and asserted that he was murdered. She later alleged that such an event was part of a plot by Putin to thwart the release of Navalny and two American citizens in an exchange with Federal Security Service's operative Vadim Krasikov, who assassinated former Chechen commander Zelimkhan Khangoshvili in Germany in 2019. Two Western officials who spoke to Politico confirmed that the United States and Germany were in preliminary discussions about creating an exchange, but said that no offer was sent to Russia while declining to comment whether Krasikov was part of the discussion.

Opposition politician Boris Nadezhdin, who unsuccessfully attempted to file his candidacy for the 2024 Russian presidential election, called Navalny "one of the most talented and bravest people in Russia I ever knew." Mikhail Khodorkovsky, a former oligarch in exile in London, urged Russians to vote for Navalny as a write-in candidate in the election as a mark of protest. He also called for Western nations to declare Putin's government, the presidential election, and its result illegitimate. Leonid Volkov, a Russian opposition politician living in Lithuania, stated: "If this is true, then not 'Navalny died,' but 'Putin killed Navalny' and only that." Opposition politician Dmitry Gudkov said: "Even if Alexei died from 'natural' causes, they were caused by his poisoning and further prison torture. The blood is on Putin's hands."

Dmitry Muratov, a Nobel Peace Prize laureate and editor-in-chief of the Latvia-based Novaya Gazeta newspaper, expressed his condolences to Navalny's family. Muratov called the death murder, adding that Navalny "was tortured and tormented for three years. As Navalny's doctor told me: the body cannot endure such things. Murder was added to Alexei Navalny's sentence." Human rights campaigner Oleg Orlov, co-chairman of the Nobel Peace Prize-winning human rights group Memorial, said Navalny's death in prison was a "crime of the regime". Writer and journalist Mikhail Zygar said that Navalny "was our future for so long. Now we don't have that future anymore." Veteran human rights activist Lev Ponomaryov declared, "There are still many of us. We need to act together." Fiction writer Boris Akunin said, "There is nothing more the dictator [Putin] can do to Navalny. Navalny is dead and has become immortal." Ilya Yashin, a friend of Navalny's and a fellow political prisoner, stated that Navalny "died a hero".

One of Navalny's lawyers, Leonid Solovyov, told Novaya Gazeta that Navalny was "normal" when a lawyer saw him on 14 January.

Russians began bringing flowers to monuments to victims of political repression in cities across the country. Russian human rights group OVD-Info initially reported that by 17 February, more than 400 people had been detained by authorities in over 36 cities for taking part in the gatherings; the number was later corrected to 366 people. Among those arrested was a priest who intended to hold a mass for Navalny and subsequently suffered a stroke while in police custody. In some cities, flowers were removed and the police took photos of people laying flowers in memory of Navalny. People laid flowers at Moscow's Solovetsky Stone and the Wall of Grief. The Moscow Prosecutor's Office warned Russians against mass protests. In Saint Petersburg alone, 154 people were sentenced to 14 days' imprisonment for violating anti-protest laws. At least six of them were reportedly issued military draft notices upon their release. Russian digital map company 2GIS reportedly blocked reviews of memorial sites after people used the service to write about memorials for Navalny.

Sobesednik, the only newspaper within Russia which published a detailed report on Navalny's death, stated that "Russia is a happy country [because] Navalnys are sometimes born in it", and described him as "the symbol of a peaceful country". Shortly after hitting Moscow newsstands, virtually all copies of the issue with a print circulation of 154,810 were confiscated without any legal justification.

The political party Civic Initiative released a statement calling Navalny's death "a political murder". It also announced plans to organize a march in honor of Navalny and Boris Nemtsov in Moscow on 2 March.

According to OVD-Info, over 46,000 people sent appeals to the Investigative Committee of Russia demanding the release of Navalny's remains to his family after the refusal of the Investigative Committee to do so.

The Russian Volunteer Corps, a Russian anti-Kremlin and far-right armed unit fighting in Ukraine against Russian government forces said that Navalny's death came while they were revising their plans to free him, which had been in place since December and which would have involved taking him to Ukraine.

==== Russian government ====
Presidential spokesperson Dmitry Peskov told reporters that Putin had been informed of Navalny's death, although Putin did not publicly comment on it during a meeting in Chelyabinsk on the day it was announced. The Directorate of the Investigative Committee for the Yamalo-Nenets Autonomous Okrug organized a procedural investigation into the death. The Federal Penitentiary Service also began inspections "in accordance with all applicable rules". Peskov denied accusations from Yulia Navalnaya that Putin had been responsible for her husband's death, calling them "absolutely unfounded", and rejected EU foreign policy chief Josep Borrell's call for an international investigation into Navalny's death, stating that the Kremlin "does not accept such demands at all". In an interview on Russian state television, Sergey Naryshkin, the head of the Russian Foreign Intelligence Service (SVR), also said that Navalny died of natural causes.

The Russian independent media outlet Agentstvo reported that within thirty minutes of Navalny's death being announced, the ruling United Russia party issued a message to its deputies in the State Duma to "keep strictly in line with the Federal Prison Service's version [or] better to refrain from commenting at all". Russian state-controlled media provided minimal coverage of Navalny's death.

In response to international condemnation over Navalny's death, foreign ministry spokesperson Maria Zakharova criticized Western countries for having "its conclusions ready". Peskov himself described foreign leaders' reactions as "absolutely rabid". Putin's close associate Vyacheslav Volodin, Speaker of the State Duma, along with Vasily Piskaryov, chairman of the Duma's commission on foreign interference, blamed Navalny's death on "Washington", "Brussels" and various critics of the Kremlin in "unfriendly countries". Several other politicians and public figures, including Tina Kandelaki, Anton Krasovsky, and Sergei Markov, blamed Navalny's death on the US or the West. A Just Russia – For Truth leader Sergey Mironov stated that Navalny's death was beneficial for "Russia's enemies". Margarita Simonyan, editor-in-chief of the Russian state-owned network RT, stated on Telegram that "everyone has long forgotten him [Navalny], that there was no point in killing him" since it was beneficial to "exactly the opposite forces".

Vladislav Davankov, deputy chair in the Duma and presidential candidate for the New People party, stated that Navalny's death was a "tragedy".

Shortly following his victory in the 2024 Russian presidential election on 17 March, Putin made his first direct mention of Navalny in a news conference, saying that he had considered exchanging him for prisoners held in the West on the condition that Navalny would remain abroad. On 18 March however, Dmitry Peskov said that no negotiations had taken place and that the idea was forwarded to Putin by a person that he did not identify.

=== International ===
Crowds in Belgrade, Serbia mourning Alexey Navalny (video)

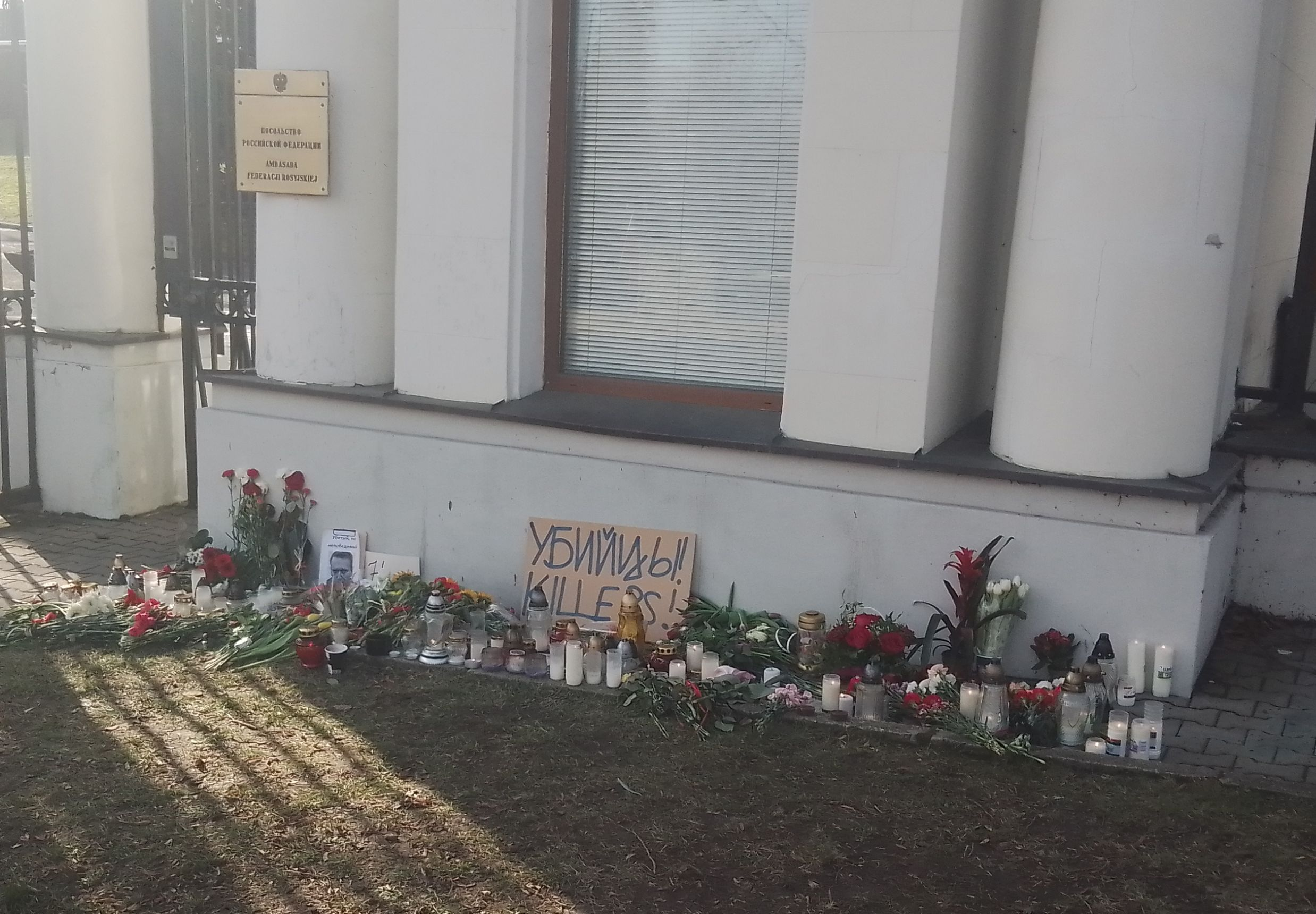
A makeshift memorial in front of the Russian embassy in Warsaw, Poland

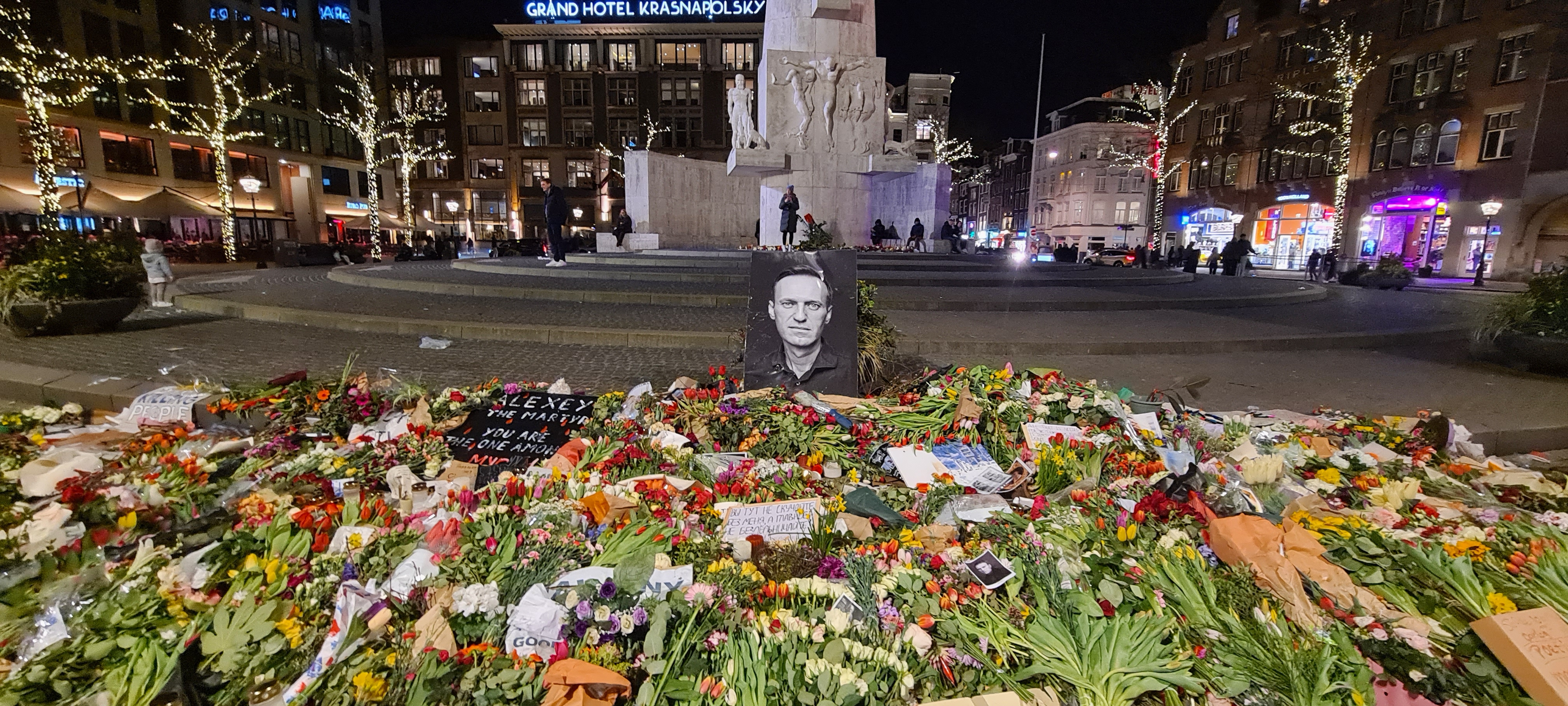
A makeshift memorial at the National Monument, Amsterdam, Netherlands

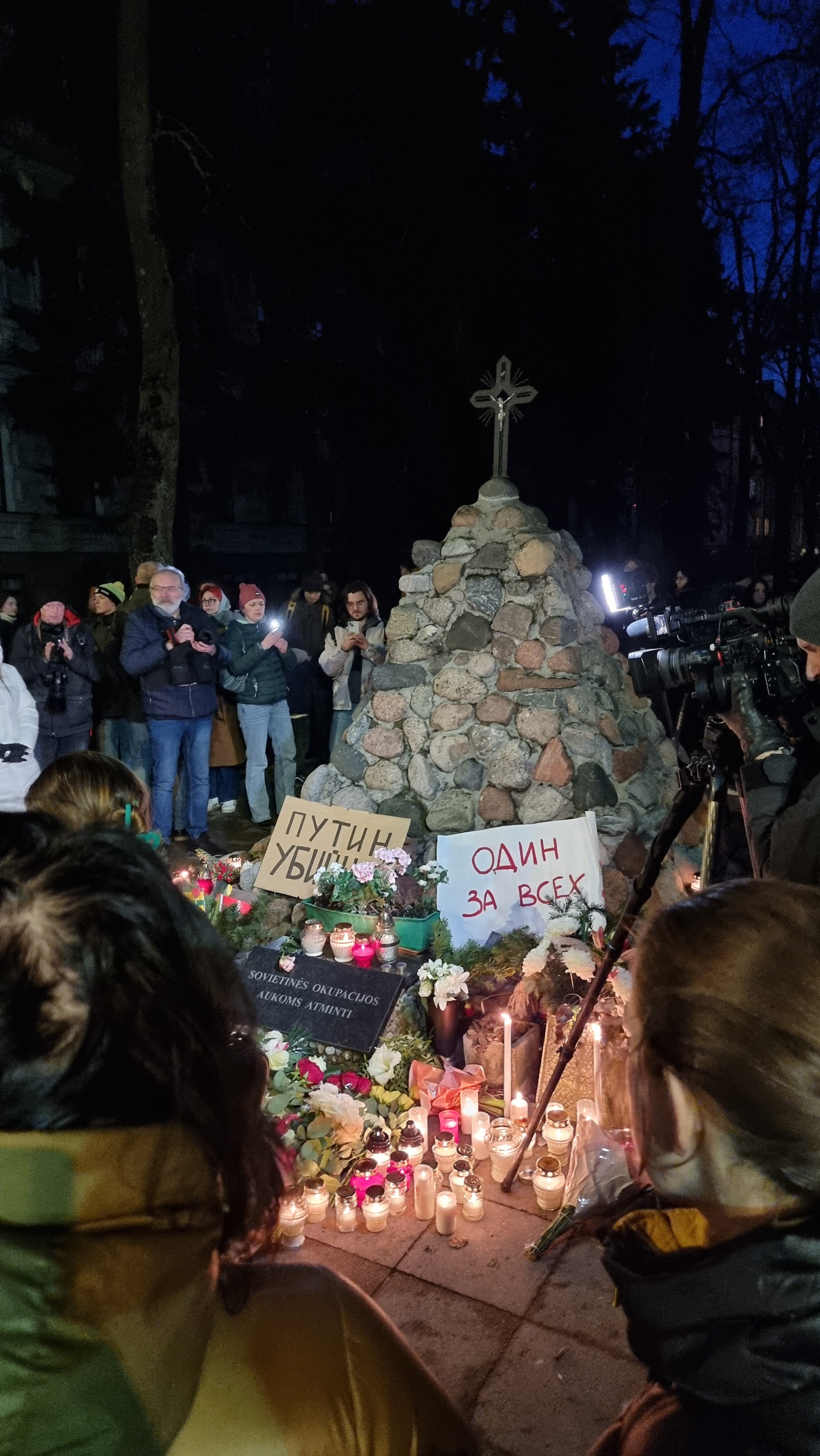
Memorial in Vilnius, Lithuania

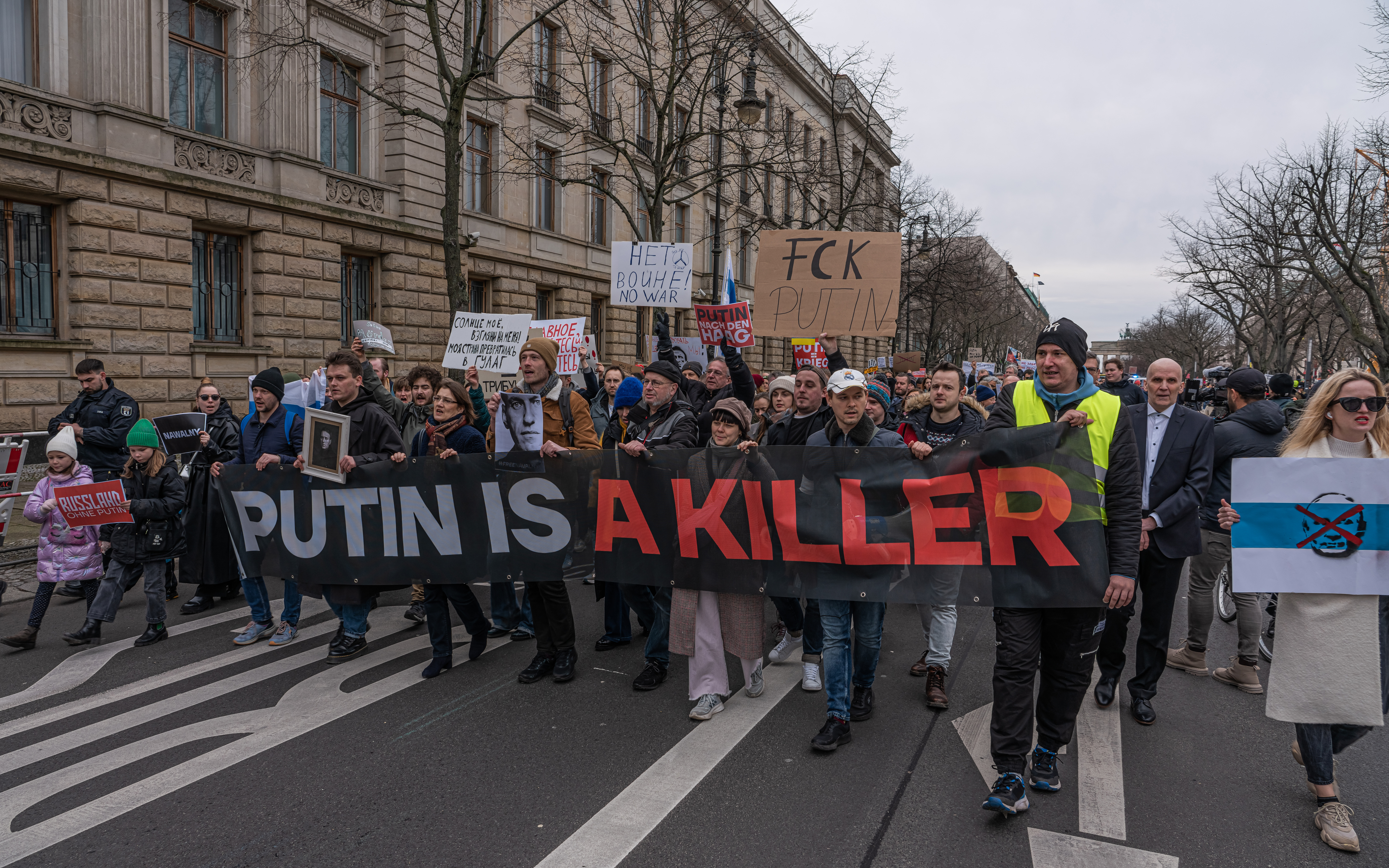
Demonstration around the Embassy of Russia, Berlin, Germany

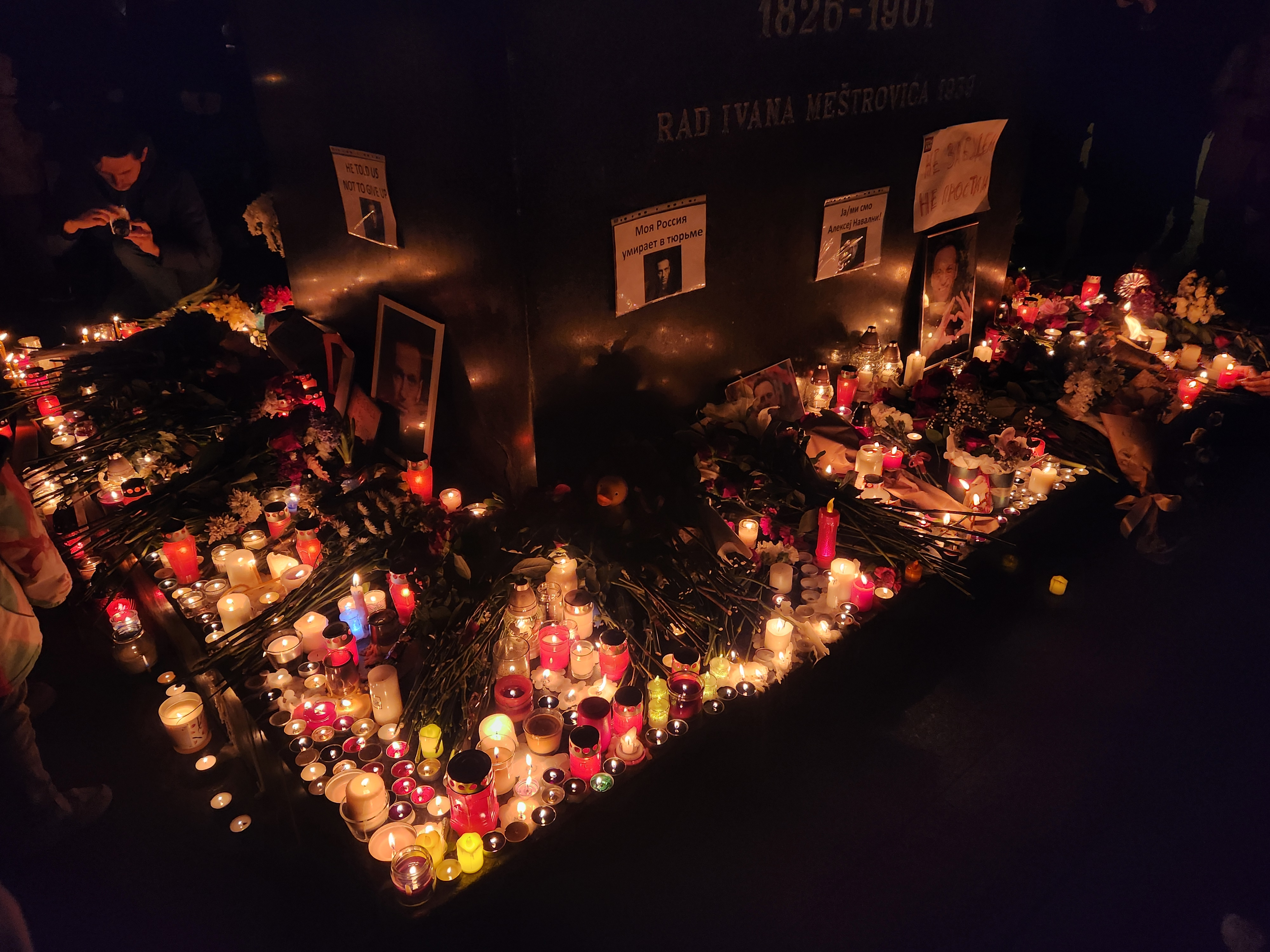
Memorial in Novi Sad, Serbia on 16 February 2024

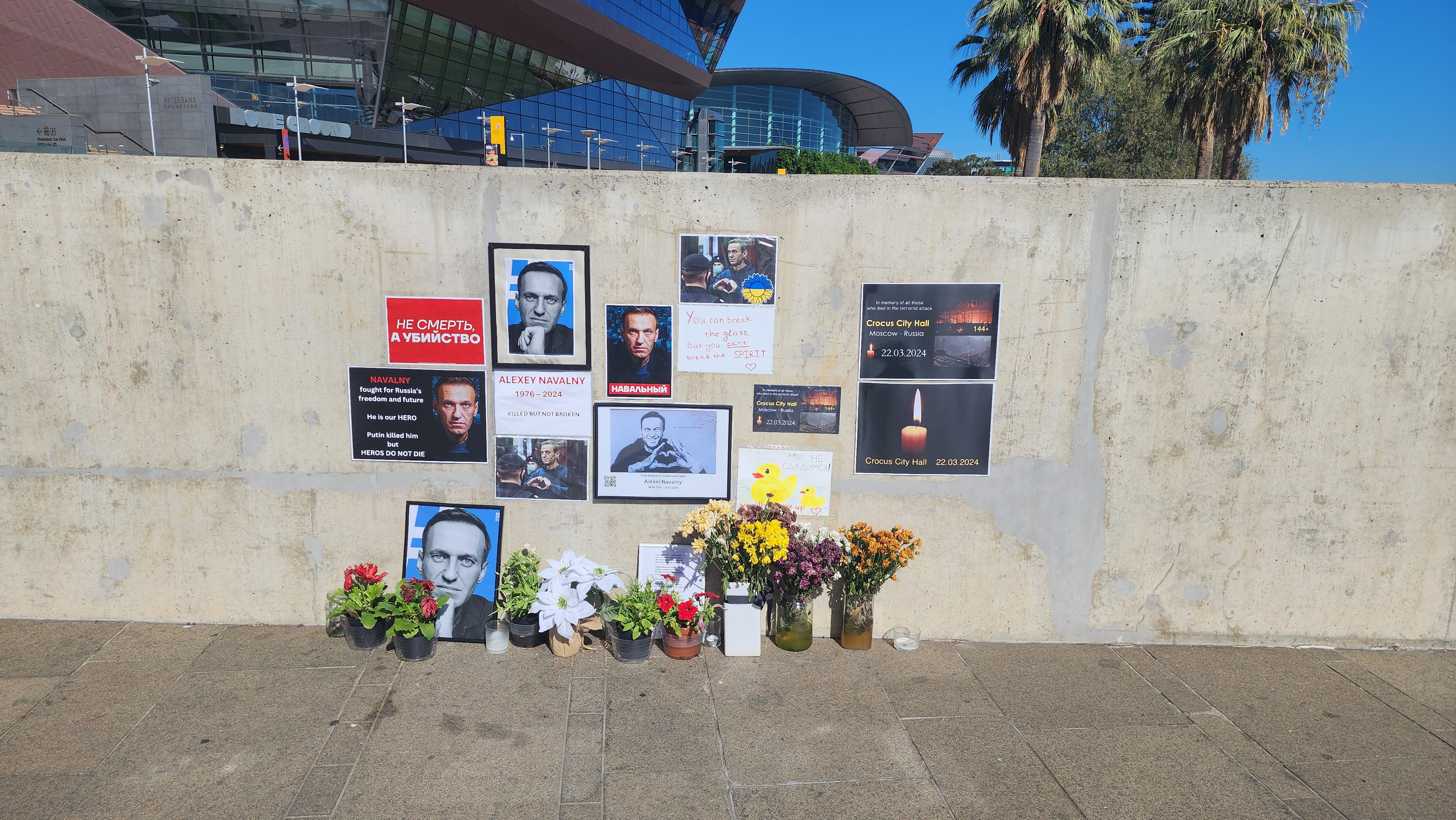
Makeshift memorial in Adelaide, Australia

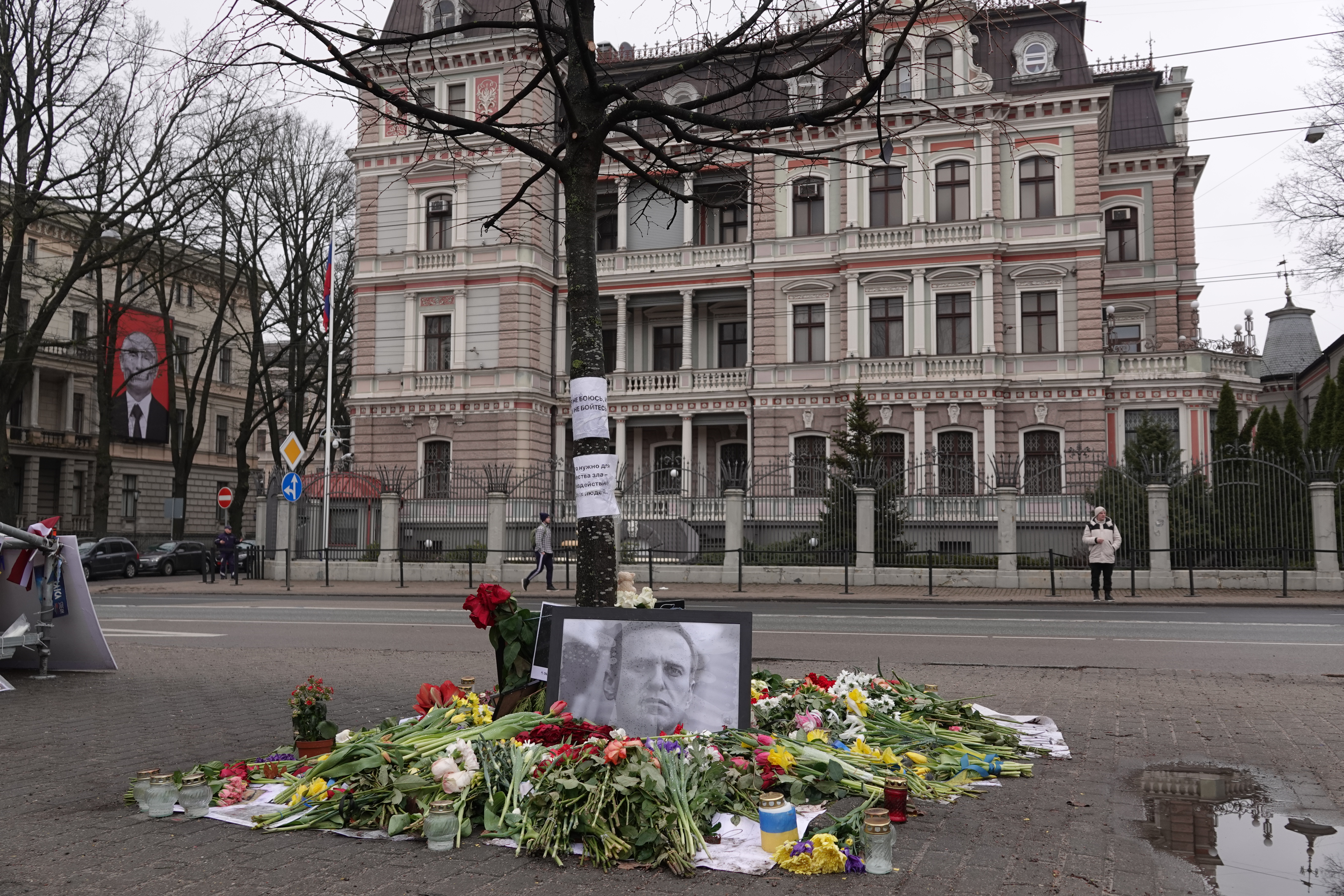
A makeshift memorial in front of the Russian embassy in Riga, Latvia

Direct or indirect accusations against the Russian authorities in connection with Navalny's death have been made by many leaders of Western countries and representatives of major international organizations. Leaders of prominent countries in the "Global South", along with most post-Soviet states in Central Asia and the Caucasus, did not issue official reactions to the news; nor did president Recep Tayyip Erdoğan of Turkey, which is the only NATO member state not designated on Russia's "unfriendly countries list". On 4 March, 43 countries called on the United Nations Human Rights Council to conduct an independent investigation into Navalny’s death.

On 18 February, US ambassador to Russia Lynne Tracy and UK ambassador Nigel Casey publicly laid flowers in honor of Navalny at the Solovetsky Stone in Moscow.

==== Governments ====
- Argentina: The foreign ministry called on Russian authorities to launch an investigation into Navalny's death.
- Australia: Prime Minister Anthony Albanese tweeted that the country mourned Navalny's "tragic death", and called his treatment "unforgivable". Foreign minister Penny Wong said that Navalny's "heroic opposition to Putin's repressive and unjust dictatorship had inspired the world", and that Australia held the Russian government "solely responsible". Ambassador John Geering attended Navalny's funeral and laid flowers.
- Austria: President Alexander Van der Bellen offered his condolences on social media, writing that "Vladimir Putin and his murderous regime" were responsible for Navalny's death.
- Belgium: Prime Minister Alexander De Croo said Navalny's death "again underscores why we continue to support Ukraine" against the Russian invasion.
- Brazil: President Luiz Inácio Lula da Silva called for an investigation into Navalny's death to be carried out before making any accusations of murder.
- Bulgaria: Prime Minister Nikolai Denkov called Navalny a symbol of the struggle against dictatorship in Russia and emphasized the value of democracy. Foreign Minister Mariya Gabriel expressed her grief and praised Navalny's "remarkable courage." President Rumen Radev stated that "the world lost one of its most outstanding fighters for human rights and democracy".
- Canada: Prime Minister Justin Trudeau said that Navalny's death "has us all reeling. It's something that has the entire world being reminded of exactly what a monster Putin is", adding that Navalny died "because he stood up to Putin, he stood up to the Kremlin. He stood for freedom and democracy and the right of the Russian people to choose their future, and that was something that Putin was deeply afraid of, as he should be." Foreign minister Mélanie Joly tweeted that Navalny "gave his freedom in the hopes of a better, more democratic future for the Russian people", and wrote that his death represented a "painful reminder of Putin's continued oppressive regime".
- China: Foreign ministry spokesperson Mao Ning declined to comment on Navalny's death, describing it as "Russia's internal affair".
- Croatia: The government demanded a transparent investigation, the return of Navalny's remains to his family and the release of all dissidents. Prime minister Andrej Plenković expressed his "outrage" over Navalny's death.
- Cyprus: President Nikos Christodoulides tweeted that "History will remember Alexei Navalny as a true and fierce defender of freedom, democracy, human rights, and as a symbol of courage and determination".
- Czech Republic: Foreign minister Jan Lipavský wrote that Russia was "treating its citizens like it treats its foreign policy", and that it "has turned into a violent state that kills people who dream of a better future, like Nemtsov or now Navalny – imprisoned and tortured to death for standing up to Putin".
- Denmark: Foreign minister and former prime minister Lars Løkke Rasmussen said that "Russia lost someone who dared work for a different Russia", adding that the Russian government "was responsible for Navalny's health during his politically motivated incarceration".
- Estonia: Prime Minister Kaja Kallas wrote that Navalny's death was "yet another dark reminder of the rogue regime we're dealing with – and why Russia and all those responsible must be held accountable for each of their crimes". Foreign minister Margus Tsahkna stated that the news demonstrated the "heartless, aggressive and destructive power" of Putin.
- Finland: Prime Minister Petteri Orpo said that responsibility for Navalny's death lay with the Russian leadership and offered condolences to his family. President Sauli Niinistö expressed similar opinions in a social media post.
- France: President Emmanuel Macron wrote: "I salute the memory of Alexeï Navalny, his commitment, his courage."
- Georgia: President Salome Zourabichvili called Navalny's death "a tragedy for all democracy and human rights defenders" and expressed her condolences for his family and "those who in Russia continue his fight for democracy".
- Germany: Chancellor Olaf Scholz said that he "paid for his courage with his life".
- Greece: Prime Minister Kyriakos Mitsotakis stated "Navalny fought fiercely for democracy and stood up to a brutal, authoritarian regime. A regime that made sure Navalny paid for his bravery first with his freedom, and now with his life. Our thoughts are with his family."
- Hungary: Following several days of government silence on the issue, on 26 February, Prime Minister Viktor Orbán acknowledged Navalny's death during a parliamentary session when an opposition politician asked representatives to stand up in honor of Navalny. Referring to the fact that MPs of the ruling Fidesz–KDNP alliance and Our Homeland Movement refused to do so, Orbán said that "chauvinists deserve no respect" and "we will not stand up for someone who referred to Georgians as rats in the Russo-Georgian War. Otherwise may he rest in peace."
- Iceland: Foreign Minister Bjarni Benediktsson tweeted that he was "saddened" at Navalny's death and offered condolences to his family and supporters. He also put responsibility on his death to Putin and the Russian government.
- Ireland: Taoiseach Leo Varadkar said Navalny's death was "further evidence if we ever needed it that Russia is a deeply oppressive State and that anyone who challenges President Putin risks their lives." Tánaiste Micheál Martin said Navalny's death "underpins the lack of respect for the rule of law and protection of human rights in Russia".
- Italy: Prime Minister Giorgia Meloni said that Navalny's death was "disturbing", and served as a warning to the rest of the world.
- Kosovo: Prime Minister Albin Kurti wrote on X (formerly Twitter) social network:"The reported death of Navalny is a call to everyone to see authoritarianism for what it is, a willingness to kill and torture anyone who threatens the narrow control of power."
- Latvia: President Edgars Rinkēvičs offered condolences to Navalny's family and friends and stated that he "was just brutally murdered by the Kremlin. That's a fact and that is something one should know about the true nature of Russia's current regime." Prime Minister Evika Siliņa reacted from the sidelines of the Munich Security Conference, saying Navalny had been "tortured to death". Foreign Minister Krišjānis Kariņš said he was "deeply distraught" by news of Navalny's untimely death, also pinning the blame firmly on "Putin's criminal regime".
- Lithuania: President Gitanas Nausėda blamed the Russian government for the death of Navalny and called for action to be taken.
- Malta: Foreign Affairs Minister Ian Borg said Malta wanted Russian authorities "to provide clarity regarding the circumstances of his death", as he offered Navalny's family the country's condolences.
- Moldova: President Maia Sandu expressed her condolences to Navalny's family and to "all democratically-minded Russians, and those bravely fighting for freedom and democracy within Russia and abroad".
- Netherlands: Prime Minister Mark Rutte said that Navalny "fought for democratic values and against corruption", and paid "for his struggle with death while he was held under the harshest and most inhumane conditions".
- New Zealand: Prime Minister Christopher Luxon said that he was "saddened to hear" of Navalny's death and called him a "fierce advocate of freedom and anti-corruption". Minister for Foreign Affairs Winston Peters said on X Navalny had "fought for change in Russia". He championed freedom and democracy, and combated corruption. We are deeply saddened by reports of his untimely death." Peters said his thoughts were with Navalny's family and loved ones.
- Norway: Foreign minister Espen Barth Eide stated that the government of Russia bore "a heavy responsibility" for Navalny's death.
- Poland: Prime Minister Donald Tusk tweeted: "Alexei, we will never forget you. And we will never forgive them."
- Portugal: Foreign minister João Gomes Cravinho placed the responsibility of Navalny's death on Putin.
- Romania: President Klaus Iohannis wrote on social media expressing his condolences, and urging the Russian authorities to conduct a transparent and coherent investigation.
- Slovenia: Foreign Minister Tanja Fajon expressed outrage at Navalny's death, stated that responsibility for his death lies with Vladimir Putin, and criticized the arrests of people that have publicly paid tribute to Navalny.
- Spain: Prime Minister Pedro Sánchez expressed his condolences to "[Navalny's] family and friends and to all those in Russia who defend democratic values and pay for it the highest of prices".
- Sweden: Prime Minister Ulf Kristersson stated that the "Russian authorities, and President Putin personally, are responsible for Alexei Navalny no longer being alive".
- Switzerland: The Federal Department of Foreign Affairs posted a statement saying: "Switzerland is appalled by the death of Alexei Navalny, an exemplary defender of democracy and fundamental rights." It added that it awaited an investigation into the cause of his death and expressed condolences to his family.
- Ukraine: President Volodymyr Zelenskyy stated that "Quite obviously he was killed by Putin, like thousands of others, tortured, because of this one monster. Putin doesn't care who dies, just as long as he stays in power."
- United Kingdom: Prime Minister Rishi Sunak said that Navalny "demonstrated incredible courage throughout his life" and that his death was "terrible news". He also said that "Navalny died for a cause to which he dedicated his whole life - freedom. To return home knowing that Putin had already tried to have him killed was one of the most courageous acts of the 21st century." Foreign secretary and former prime minister David Cameron said that "We should hold Putin accountable for this" and that "There should be consequences".

External videos
- Comments by U.S. President Joe Biden on the death of Alexei Navalny, February 16, 2024, C-SPAN

- United States: President Joe Biden praised Navalny's legacy, saying he "was everything Putin is not. He was brave, he was principled, he was dedicated to building a Russia where rule of law existed and where it applied to everybody", and, stating that he held Putin responsible, added that he was "both not surprised and outraged" by reports of Navalny's death in prison. Secretary of State Antony Blinken stated that the "fixation and fear of one man only underscores the weakness and rot at the heart of the system that Putin has built. Russia is responsible for this."

==== Intergovernmental organizations ====
- European Union: President of the European Council Charles Michel said that Navalny "fought for the values of freedom and democracy", and that "[for] his ideals, he made the ultimate sacrifice". European Commission President Ursula von der Leyen wrote that she was "deeply disturbed and saddened" by news of Navalny's death. In a joint statement, von der Leyen and Vice President Josep Borrell stated that the EU will do whatever it can to hold Russia accountable for his death, and demanded the release of all other political prisoners.
- NATO: Secretary General Jens Stoltenberg said that he was "saddened and disturbed by reports coming from Russia" and called for an investigation into the death of Navalny.
- United Nations: Secretary-General António Guterres called for a full investigation of Navalny's death. OHCHR spokesperson Liz Throssell stated: "If someone dies in the custody of the State, the presumption is that the State is responsible – a responsibility that can only be rebutted through an impartial, thorough and transparent investigation carried out by an independent body." Special Rapporteur on Torture and Other Cruel, Inhuman or Degrading Treatment or Punishment, Alice Jill Edwards, said that several UN independent experts, including herself, urged the Russian government to end the punitive conditions in which Navalny was held, adding that their "appeals to the Kremlin" were "blatantly ignored" with complete "disregard for human life". The UN Special Rapporteur on the Russian Federation, Mariana Katzarova, demanded the release of other Russian political prisoners, including Vladimir Kara-Murza, Ilya Yashin and Alexei Gorinov.

==== Foreign opposition leaders ====
- Australia: Peter Dutton, leader of the Liberal Party, tweeted that Navalny "sought to save his country from a murderous dictator. He had been poisoned, tortured and wrongly imprisoned." and "gave his life for a country and people he loved".
- Azerbaijan: The head of the Azerbaijan Popular Front Party, Ali Karimli, stated that "the killing of [...] Alexei Navalny is one of the most shameful pages in Russian history" and described him as "a very determined, talented and brilliant politician".
- Belarus: Belarusian opposition leader Sviatlana Tsikhanouskaya wrote that Navalny's death was "further proof that for dictators, human life holds no value."
- Canada: Pierre Poilievre leader of the Conservative Party tweeted "Putin imprisoned Navalny for the act of opposing the regime. Conservatives condemn Putin for his death".
- Georgia: Levan Khabeishvili, leader of the United National Movement party, tweeted "Navalny's murder is a wake-up call to all that care about the future of liberty" and compared his treatment to that of imprisoned former Georgian president Mikheil Saakashvili.
- Germany: Friedrich Merz, leader of the Christian Democratic Union, said that Navalny's death "was a clear order from the Russian president".
- Italy: Elly Schlein, leader of the Democratic Party said that Navalny's death was "entirely the responsibility of the Russian government".
- United Kingdom: Keir Starmer, leader of the Labour Party, tweeted that "Navalny showed incredible, impossible courage in his fight for Russian democracy" and described his death as "terrible news for the Russian people."
- United States: Former president Donald Trump compared his legal challenges to that of Navalny on Truth Social. In response, Nikki Haley, his rival for the 2024 Republican presidential primaries, said that Trump "continues to side with Vladimir Putin - a man who kills his political opponents, holds American journalists hostage, and has never hidden his desire to destroy America".

==== Human rights organisations ====
- Amnesty International Secretary General Agnès Callamard called on the "United Nations to employ its special procedures and mechanisms to address the death".
- Human Rights Watch's executive director Tirana Hassan said that "Russian authorities bear full responsibility for what has happened to Navalny."
- Physicians for Human Rights released a statement saying Navalny's death "demands a rigorous, independent investigation in line with international standards."
- The International Federation for Human Rights released a statement saying while the cause of Navalny's death remains unknown, it considered "that his ill-treatment - a grave human rights violation in itself - likely contributed to his passing, placing the responsibility for Navalny's death on the Russian authorities".
- Human Rights Foundation Chairman Garry Kasparov said that Navalny's death was "yet another heinous crime by Putin's corrupt regime. A slow-motion murder for the entire world to bear witness" and "a somber reminder that Putin will not stop until he's stopped."
- Open Society Foundations said "the Kremlin's fear of Navalny indicates that the narrative of inevitability the Russian regime projects about its success and hold on power is deeply misleading."
- Freedom House President Michael J. Abramowitz said Navalny's death showed that "Putin is a coward" who "fears his own people." It also held him and his "henchmen" responsible for Navalny's imprisonment and death.

==== Public ====
Bono of U2 speaking and leading a chant of Navalny's name at his band's concert in Las Vegas on 17 February

Rallies were held in honor of Navalny in over 25 countries. (Note: Argentina, Armenia, Bulgaria, Czech Republic, Denmark, Estonia, Finland, France, Georgia, Germany, Israel, Italy, Japan, Kyrgyzstan, Latvia, Lithuania, Moldova, the Netherlands, Norway, Poland, Portugal, Romania, Serbia, South Africa, Spain, Switzerland, Turkey, the UK, and the US) In Turkey, police detained protesters and broke up rallies. At least eight other instances of rallies for Navalny being broken up were reported in Belarus, Cuba, France, Greece, Italy, Thailand, Uzbekistan, and Vietnam. In Berlin, a march held by Pussy Riot members Nadya Tolokonnikova and Lucy Shtein, as well as opposition politician Lyubov Sobol and former Russian state media journalist Marina Ovsyannikova, was prevented by police from reaching the Brandenburg Gate after they had held a protest at the Russian embassy.

Mourners laid flowers in Navalny's honor in Tashkent, Uzbekistan, and Almaty, Kazakhstan, where many Russians have fled since 2022 to avoid mobilization in the Russian invasion of Ukraine.

In Finland, an exhibit dedicated in memory of Navalny and other Russian dissidents was opened at the Helsinki Central Library Oodi on 17 February. A group of Russian residents in Helsinki also organized a petition for a park adjacent to the Russian Embassy to be renamed in honor of Navalny.

American commentator Tucker Carlson, who faced criticism for hosting "The Vladimir Putin Interview" several days before Navalny's death, told The Daily Mail and The New York Times: "It's horrifying what happened to Navalny. The whole thing is barbaric and awful. No decent person would defend it."

On 17 February, Irish singer Bono of U2 led crowds in a chant of Navalny's name at his band's concert in Las Vegas, stating "Tonight, the people who believe in freedom must say his name. Not just remember it, but say it."

On the day of Navalny's funeral on 1 March, a protest and memorial service was held by Russian exiles in Georgia at the Russian embassy in Tbilisi, while in Italy, members of the Radical Party protested at the Russian embassy in Rome.

Hours following the announcement of Navalny's death, a group of hackers opposed to the Russian government launched a cyberattack on the online shopping service JSC Kaluzhskoe, which provides commissary needs for the Federal Penitentiary Service, defacing the website with messages supporting Navalny and lowering the price of goods sold to relatives of prisoners by inserting unauthorized discounts. The group also said it had gained access to a database containing records and contact details of inmates and their relatives.

==== Sanctions ====
Ahead of a meeting of EU foreign ministers, German foreign minister Annalena Baerbock proposed additional sanctions against Russia as a direct response to Navalny's death. His widow, Yulia Navalnaya, addressed the meeting in Brussels and called for more sanctions directly targeting Putin's inner circle. Josep Borrell, the EU foreign policy commissioner, pledged action to hold "Vladimir Putin and his regime" accountable. Borrell also stated that the EU's human rights sanctions list may be renamed after Navalny in a symbolic move of support.

On 21 February, the United Kingdom imposed sanctions on the head of the Polar Wolf colony, Colonel Vadim Kalinin, and five of his deputies. On 23 February, the United States announced sanctions on three Russian officials, including the deputy director of the Federal Penitentiary Service who was promoted three days after Navalny's death. On 3 March, Canada announced sanctions on six senior Russian officials working in the prosecutorial, judicial and correctional services for their involvement in Navalny's imprisonment and death. On 22 March, the EU imposed sanctions on 33 Russian officials in the justice and penal systems in connection with Navalny's death, including Kalinin and the management of the IK-6 corrective colony in Vladimir Oblast, where Navalny was held before his transfer to the Polar Wolf colony.

== See also ==
- 2024 Ankara prisoner exchange, an event negotiated for months following Navalny's death.
- 2023 Wagner Group plane crash
- Activism against corruption in Russia
- Human rights in Russia
- List of prison deaths
- List of Russian assassinations
- Poison laboratory of the Soviet secret services
- Poisoning of Alexey Navalny
- Suspicious Russia-related deaths since 2022

Other notable Russian deaths and assassination attempts

- Death of Boris Berezovsky
- Poisoning of Alexander Litvinenko
- Death of Sergei Magnitsky
- Assassination of Boris Nemtsov
- Assassination of Anna Politkovskaya
- Poisoning of Sergei and Yulia Skripal
