= Jonathan Demme's unrealized projects =

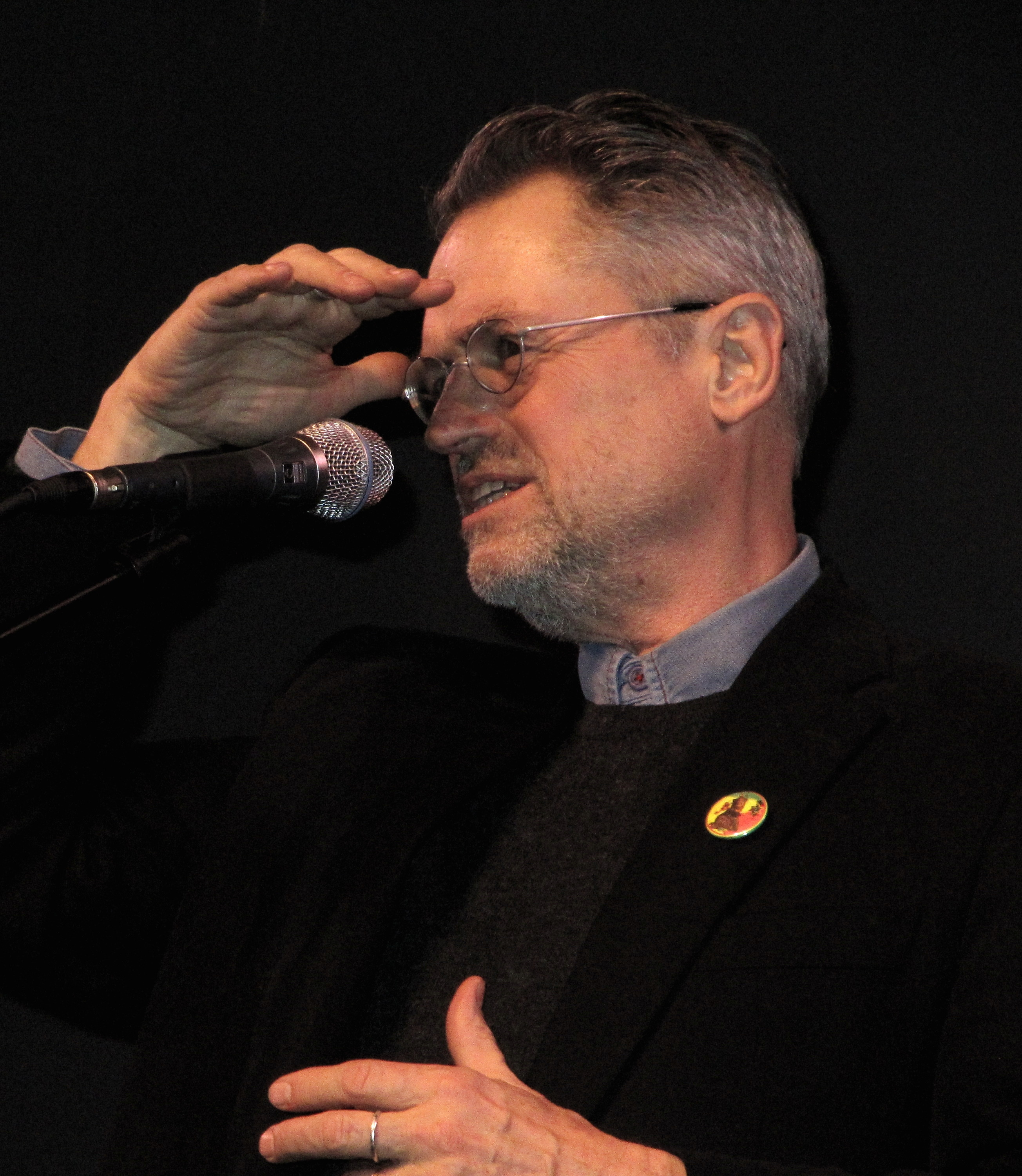
Demme, pictured at the Coolidge Corner Theatre in 2010

During his long career, American filmmaker Jonathan Demme worked on a number of projects that never progressed beyond the pre-production stage under his direction. Some of these projects fell into development hell, were officially cancelled, were in development limbo or would see life under a different production team.

== 1970s ==
=== The Confidence Man ===
In 1974, it was announced that Demme was going direct a screenplay he wrote for Roger Corman based on The Confidence-Man, a novel by Herman Melville set on a Mississippi riverboat in the 1850s.

=== King of Cannibal Islands ===
In 1977, Demme planned to direct his own adaptation of Herman Melville's Typee, produced by his then-wife Evelyn Purcell. In 1987, it was reported that Demme would direct the film with the producing assistance of Jeremy Thomas. This version was to be titled King of Cannibal Islands.

=== Creator ===
In the late 1970s, Demme was enlisted by Hal Ashby to direct Jeremy Leven's Creator as a film production for his company Northstar International. In 1980, the film rights were sold to Lorimar, with Demme attached to make the film, budgeted as roughly $8–10 million. Production was set to begin in Cambridge and Boston in March or April 1981 and last sixteen weeks, with a planned December release. However, by 1984, Kings Road Productions and Universal Pictures were now producing the film, with Demme no longer attached.

=== American Splendor ===
As early as 1979, underground comix writer Harvey Pekar was first contacted by Demme with an interest in developing/making a film on his life as depicted in the American Splendor series. However, Demme was unable to raise money at the time since he was not yet an established director. He wrote to Pekar, "A movie is one of the harder things in life to accomplish." Unsympathetically, Pekar responded, "I want a movie!" As journalist Louis Black also recalled, "Harvey [always] complained: 'Demme? Demme? He's talking about having some kid waiting in line at a grocery cashier wearing headphones but Demme wants him to be listening to loud punk music! Punk music! I don't know anything about it and I'm not interested. That's not my trip at all.'" It wasn't until 1999 that development began moving forward on an American Splendor film; which eventually saw release in 2003, and was written and directed by Shari Springer Berman and Robert Pulcini.

== 1980s ==
=== Night of the Living Feelies ===
In 1980, after seeing the post-new wave band The Feelies, Demme concocted a premise for a concert documentary in which zombified residents of a small town "lumber into a Feelies concert looking for a midnight snack" and are rejuvenated by the "raucous restorative powers" of their music. He wanted to film it in black and white at the band's home base in Haledon, New Jersey and open with solemn, "Walker Evans-like" portraits of "vaguely zombie-ish young people". The film would be called Night of the Living Feelies, and was described by the Feelies co-founder Glenn Mercer as being a combination of The Last Waltz and Night of the Living Dead. Though it never got off the ground, Demme later cast members of the group in his 1986 film Something Wild, and his idea was later mentioned in a 1988 article published by Time magazine.

=== Love Hurts ===
After Melvin and Howard, Demme set his next film as Love Hurts, from a screenplay written by Ron Nyswaner that he wanted to star Nick Nolte, who he said "would have been great as the central character." Demme later described his failure to convince Nolte to read the script as one of his biggest regrets, as he was "passionately desirous" to make the film and unable to at the time with another star. Later however, in 1990, the script was produced under director Bud Yorkin, and starred Jeff Daniels in the lead.

=== Crimes of the Heart ===
In 1981, Demme was attached to direct the film adaptation of Beth Henley's play Crimes of the Heart, executive produced by Burt Sugarman. At that time, Diane Keaton was in talks to star, but it fell through last minute and was later realized five years later under director Bruce Beresford.

=== Red Harvest ===
In 1982, Italian film director Bernardo Bertolucci developed a film adaptation of Red Harvest by Dashiell Hammett, and had Demme work on the script alongside Clare Peploe and Barocco co-writer Marilyn Goldin.

=== Birdy ===
Also in 1982, Demme was pursued by A&M Films to direct Birdy.

=== Man Trouble ===
In 1983, Diane Keaton and Jack Nicholson were cast to star in the romantic comedy Man Trouble, with Demme at that time attached to direct. The film was eventually made in 1992, albeit with Ellen Barkin in place of Keaton and Bob Rafelson in place of Demme.

=== Rosebud County ===
According to Peter Bogdanovich, in the early-to-mid-1980s, Demme nearly directed a script written by Larry McMurtry called Rosebud County for his company Moon Pictures. "We tried to get Barbara Stanwyck, but she said she hated the script because it was nothing but cuss words," he said. The project was later realized for television as Montana, but without Demme or Bogdanovich's participation.

=== Stealing Home ===
In 1984, a two-year option on the screenplay for Stealing Home was acquired by Jaffe/Lansing Productions, with Demme involved to direct the project. By 1986, Warner Bros. acquired the property, with writers Steven Kampmann and Will Aldis set to co-direct.

=== Handcarved Coffins ===
In April 1984, Demme spoke of his intention to make a film of Truman Capote's "Handcarved Coffins", a novella which he described as "a hard-edged mystery, a mystery with violence."

=== Untitled John Milius collaboration ===
Also in April 1984, Demme revealed that he talked with John Milius about making a film from one of his scripts, "a semi-political fantasy thriller", about a futuristic account of a Green Beret action set within the United States.

=== Peggy Sue Got Married ===
In September 1984, Demme was in preproduction on Peggy Sue Got Married for TriStar Pictures. Cast to play the lead at that time was Debra Winger, who disagreed with Demme's approach to the material and advocated for Penny Marshall to replace him as director. When Francis Ford Coppola took the helm, the part was recast for Kathleen Turner.

=== Extreme Prejudice ===
Also in late 1984, Carolco Pictures acquired Extreme Prejudice, a modern day Western written by John Milius, and was negotiating with Demme to direct. Demme envisioned Robert Mitchum in the role of the aging lawman. In December that year, Demme told Daily Variety he hoped to complete a rewrite of the screenplay by March and begin filming in Texas in summer 1985, with Milius aboard as a producer. However, neither Demme nor Milius stayed with the project and Walter Hill was brought aboard to direct the film with Nick Nolte in the Mitchum part.

=== About Last Night ===
In the mid-1980s, Demme was attached to direct Nick Nolte and Bill Murray in About Last Night, however, a "disastrous meeting" between them caused both to turn down the film. Following their departure, the film faced extensive rewrites and was directed by Edward Zwick, with Rob Lowe and James Belushi in their roles.

=== Famous All Over Town ===
Just before the Daniel Lewis James' death in 1988, Demme optioned his coming-of-age story Famous All Over Town—about a Mexican-American teenager in East L.A.—and enlisted him to pen a screenplay based on it. Though Demme took a liking to James, he felt that he "wasn't getting it close enough" to what he wanted and took the liberty of rewriting it himself; much to the chagrin of James, who wanted to be the only writer. Following this disagreement, Demme later recalled that the project "just kind of fizzled out."

=== Continental Drift ===
In 1988, author Russell Banks was hired by Demme to help develop a screenplay based on Continental Drift, Banks' novel about anomie and Haitian refugees in Florida. Demme intended to direct the film, but the adaptation never materialized.

== 1990s ==
=== Fatal Voyage ===
In August 1990, Fatal Voyage was announced to be in the works at Orion Pictures, with Demme directing. The project was a World War II drama about the USS Indianapolis, a Navy ship that carried supplies for the bombing of Nagasaki.

=== Parting the Waters ===
In the early 1990s, Demme sought to adapt Parting the Waters as a feature film, produced by Edward Saxon and Harry Belafonte. Anna Hamilton Phelan wrote the adaptation of the book, which was about the civil rights movement in the 1960s.

=== Rapid Pace of Battle ===
In 1993, it was reported that Demme and Edward Saxon would team with producer Eric Pleskow to develop Rapid Pace of Battle, a war drama based on the true story of Lieutenant Colonel Ralph Hayles. The film was under consideration to be Demme's next film, pending a screenplay.

=== Lonely Hearts of the Cosmos ===
In July 1995, Entertainment Weekly reported that Tom Hanks' production company Clavius Base was developing a script from Neal Jimenez, Lonely Hearts of the Cosmos, which was based on Dennis Overbye's 1991 book about cosmologists. Hanks was set to produce and star in the project, while Demme was in talks to direct.

=== The Stopwatch Gang ===
After Philadelphia, Demme spent eighteen months developing The Stopwatch Gang, which he was set to direct and produce for TriStar in 1995. Adapted from Greg Weston's book by playwright Beth Henley, the project was to star Kenneth Branagh, Kate Winslet and Bono as the gang of real-life Canadian bank robbers. "It's a wonderful, hard-to-characterize movie, not exactly a comedy, not exactly a thriller," Demme said. "And it proved to be the kind of movie no one wanted to finance. We had Bono; we had Kate Winslet pre-Titanic. We had all the locations. And the studios wouldn't make it without a giant star."

=== His Promised Land ===
In 1996, His Promised Land: The Autobiography of John P. Parker, Former Slave and Conductor of the Underground Railroad was optioned by Tri-Star Pictures as a film project for Demme to direct.

=== Untitled magic film ===
In November 1998, Demme stated in an interview that filmmaker Paul Thomas Anderson would be writing a script for him to direct that was "set in the world of magic, against a carnival backdrop". Actor/magician Ricky Jay was also said to be working on the project. In 2000, Anderson confirmed his involvement, revealing that it was conceived from "left over stuff from a thing [Demme and I] were talking about a long, long time ago". By that point, Anderson surmised that the film was unlikely to be made, though he hinted at a possible future collaboration with Demme.

=== K-PAX ===
After Beloved, Demme considered directing the sci-fi mystery K-PAX as his next film, as he was interested in working with Will Smith who was attached to star at that time. After Demme passed, Smith dropped out of the project and the resulting film starred Kevin Spacey and Jeff Bridges.

=== Harry Potter and the Philosopher's Stone ===
In 1999, it was reported that Demme, Chris Columbus, Rob Reiner and Brad Silberling were each in the running to direct the film adaptation of Harry Potter and the Philosopher's Stone, after Steven Spielberg departed from the project. The job ultimately went to Columbus, who also directed its sequel.

== 2000s ==
=== Eye in the Door ===
In March 2000, Demme was developing a screenplay adaptation of The Eye in the Door, the second in a trilogy of World War I-set novels, adapted by Ol Parker. He was set to direct the film at USA Films.

=== Asylum ===
In July 2000, it was reported that an adaptation of Patrick McGrath's novel Asylum was in development at Paramount, with Demme hoping to direct the film. Liam Neeson and Natasha Richardson were attached to star as the leads. In 2001, Stephen King signed on to rewrite the script for Asylum. It was expected to be Demme's next film following The Truth About Charlie. Richardson went on to star in the 2005 film.

=== Intolerable Cruelty ===
In October 2000, Demme was in negotiations to direct the Coen brothers' screenplay Intolerable Cruelty at Universal and Imagine Entertainment. Demme courted Hugh Grant, Tea Leoni and Geoffrey Wright to play the leads, but later dropped out of the project, and the Coens took over directorial duties. The final film starred George Clooney and Catherine Zeta-Jones instead of Grant and Leoni.

=== Family Week ===
Throughout the 2000s, Demme pondered a film version of Beth Henley's play Family Week, before directing an Off-Broadway revival of the show in 2010. "Over the years I have spoken to some actresses about it," said Demme. "They read it, and they loved it, but it was just one of these things that hasn't happened."

=== Walk Two Moons ===
When asked in a 2004 interview what his next film would be, Demme revealed that he had himself bought an option on a book called Walk Two Moons by Sharon Creech, which he said would be a coming-of-age tale of a 13 year old girl.

=== Untitled Alejandro Escovedo documentary ===
In August 2007, HARP announced that singer-songwriter Alejandro Escovedo would be the subject of a new, yet-titled concert documentary to be filmed by Demme at the famed Las Manitas Mexican restaurant in Austin, Texas. The film aimed to capture Escovedo "in his many musical incarnations," ranging from garage-rock to string quintet, and showcase songs from his entire career up until that point. Their mutual friend and SXSW co-founder, Louis Black, was to said to be instrumental in the conception of the project. When pressed about details during an interview, Escovedo admitted, "I don't know the details yet, but that thing about my watching my musical career unfold through a battle of the bands, whether that's combined with a live performance type of film, I have a feeling that's probably the way it's gonna go. But I'm not sure. What I know is that [Demme] doesn't really want to make just a concert film or a straight-up documentary." Shooting was planned to commence in May 2008. Cinematographer Lee Daniel was assigned to be the film's director of photography.

=== Marley ===
In May 2008, it was reported that Demme was replacing Martin Scorsese as director of the Bob Marley documentary, initially set to be released in 2010. Demme soon exited as well following a dispute with Stephen Bing, and the film was reconfigured by Kevin MacDonald in 2012.

=== The Courage Consort ===
In December 2008, Screen Daily reported that Demme optioned Michel Faber's The Courage Consort, with plans to develop the screenplay over the next year. The 2002 novella follows five vocal ensemble members who seclude themselves in a Belgian chateau to rehearse an extremely difficult new piece.

=== Zeitoun ===
In 2009, the film rights to Dave Eggers' book Zeitoun were acquired by Demme, who announced plans to direct a hand-animated adaptation. Daniel Pyne was to write the script, and Donald Harrison Jr. and Zafer Tawil were to compose the score. In 2012, Demme updated that the film was "in active development [...] It's been so challenging to find the money for an animated film about a Muslim American family set against the backdrop of hurricanes and floods. We've really kind of channeled our energy into the script for the time being. It's something that's going to happen." At this stage, artist Charlie Griak was hired to develop animated imagery based on the script.

== 2010s ==
=== Honeymoon with Harry ===
In August 2010, Demme was set to direct the feature adaptation of Bart Baker's novel Honeymoon with Harry, with Paul Haggis writing the screenplay, Robert De Niro and Bradley Cooper in talks to star, producing the film with Dave Bartis, Elloit Abbott and Avram Ludwig. The following year, Demme left the film due to De Niro's non-committal to starring.

=== Pride and Prejudice and Zombies ===
In October 2010, it was reported that Demme had read the script for Pride and Prejudice and Zombies and wanted to direct the film.

=== The Angriest Man in Brooklyn ===
On August 10, 2011, Deadline reported that a recent script that interested Demme—The Angriest Man in Brooklyn—had failed to materialize as it did not find a cast. Despite initial setbacks, the film would be made without him a few years later.

=== Old Fires ===
In 2012, it was reported that Demme was attached to direct the family dramedy Old Fires from a script by Heather McGowan about a world-renowned architect who comes out of a coma wanting to reconnect with his children and win back his wife's love. Production was set to begin in summer the following year. In 2013, it was revealed by Jennifer Ehle (who was cast to star in the film alongside Bryan Cranston and Jason Segel), that it had been postponed due to inability to secure financing.

=== Reid Fleming World's Toughest Milkman ===
According to Louis Black, Demme had told him he was considering developing Reid Fleming World's Toughest Milkman as a feature film, but chose to instead narrate Charlie Tyrell's 2015 documentary short, I Thought I Told You to Shut Up!!, on the subject.

=== The Immortal Life of Henrietta Lacks ===
According to David Edelstein, prior to his death, Demme wanted to make a film of the 2010 book The Immortal Life of Henrietta Lacks, which later was produced as a 2017 HBO film with Oprah Winfrey.
