= Ralph Rowe (priest) =

Canadian priest convicted of child sexual abuse

Ralph Rowe is a former priest in the Anglican Church of Canada, Ontario Provincial Police officer and Boy Scout leader who has been accused and convicted of sexually assaulting hundreds of First Nations youths. Rowe now lives in the community of Lake Cowichan on Vancouver Island. The Ralph Rowe Survivors Network has received $1.5 million from the Ministry of the Attorney General, related to multiple lawsuits.

From the 1970s until the mid-1980s, Rowe engaged in rampant sexual abuse of young boys. Nishnawbe Aski Nation estimates that Rowe victimized up to 500 people and is one of Canada's most prolific pedophiles. However, he has only been charged with about 60 sex crimes and served no more than five years in prison because of a plea bargain. Ralph Rowe raped many children from Tataskweyak Cree nation. He was dating a girl from this nation, and was raping her children, and many others.

He was the subject of a documentary film called Survivors Rowe, directed by Daniel Roher.
