= Diane Becker =

American film producer (born 1969)

Diane Becker (born October 1969) is an American film producer. She is the co-founder of Fishbowl Films. Becker was nominated for Best Documentary Feature in 2023 for Navalny. She won the Oscar for Best Documentary, a PGA, and a BAFTA.

== Life ==
Becker was born in 1969. She grew up in Massachusetts. She studied at the Rochester Institute of Technology, and American Film Institute. She worked for ABC television.

She entered the film industry in 2006 with the short film Save Me. Initially, she produced some short films, until she produced her first documentary in 2009 with Sergio. In 2018 and 2021, she was nominated for an Emmy for her work on Legion of Brothers and Tina. In 2022, she worked as a producer on Navalny, for which she was awarded the Oscar for Best Documentary. She co-founded Fishbowl films.

She is a member of BAFTA, the Producers Guild of America and the Academy of Motion Picture Arts and Sciences.

== Filmography ==
- 2006: Save Me (short film)
- 2007: A West Texas Children's Story
- 2009: Sergio
- 2010: God in America (TV series)
- 2011: Koran By Heart
- 2013: Detour
- 2013: Manhunt – The Hunt for Bin Laden
- 2013: Sexy Evil Genius
- 2014: We Are The Giant
- 2015: Jaco
- 2016: Chicken People
- 2016: We Are X
- 2016: Homegrown: The Counter Terror Dilemma
- 2017: Legion Of Brothers
- 2017: Alaska is a Drag
- 2017: The Final Year
- 2018: Inventing Tomorrow
- 2018: If I Leave Here Tomorrow: A Film About Lynyrd Skynyrd
- 2019: Sid & Judy
- 2020: Belushi
- 2000: Equal
- 2020: The Longest War
- 2020: Marvel 616
- 2020: Trial By Media
- 2020: Whirlybird
- 2021: Tina
- 2021: On The Divide
- 2021: White Coat Rebels
- 2021: Detainee 001
- 2022: Navalny (film)
- 2022: Stutz
- 2022: American Pain
- 2023: King Coal
- 2023: Maestra
- 2023: Ghosts Of Beirut
- 2023: Hollywoodgate
- 2024: The Program: Cons, Cults, and Kidnapping
- 2024: Blink
- 2026: The AI Doc: Or How I Became an Apocaloptimist
