= Melanie Miller (producer) =

American film producer

Melanie Miller is an American documentary producer. She was awarded a Peabody Award.

== Career ==
She worked for Jackson Hole Film Institute, Gravitas Ventures. and Samuel Goldwyn Films. She co-founded Fishbowl Films.

She is a member of the Producers Guild of America (PGA), the Academy of Television Arts & Sciences (ATAS), and the Academy of Motion Picture Arts and Sciences.

== Filmography ==
- Inventing Tomorrow (POV), 2019
- Whirlybird (Mubi)
- On the Divide, 2022
- Navalny, 2022
- American Pain, 2026
