= The AI Doc: Or How I Became an Apocaloptimist =

2026 film by Daniel Roher and Charlie Tyrell

- Theatrical release poster
- Directed by: Daniel Roher; Charlie Tyrell
- Produced by: Daniel Kwan; Jonathan Wang; Shane Boris; Diane Becker; Ted Tremper
- Starring: Daniel Roher
- Cinematography: Jenni Morello; Lowell A. Meyer
- Edited by: Davis Coombe; Daysha Broadway
- Music by: Marius de Vries; Matt Robertson
- Production companies: Playgrounds; Cottage M; Fishbowl Films
- Distributed by: Focus Features (United States); Universal Pictures (International)
- Release dates: January 27, 2026 (Sundance); March 27, 2026
- Running time: 104 minutes
- Country: United States
- Language: English
- Box office: $1.3 million

The AI Doc: Or How I Became an Apocaloptimist is a 2026 American documentary film directed by Daniel Roher and Charlie Tyrell. The film premiered at the Sundance Film Festival on January 27, 2026, which was followed by a theatrical release in the United States on March 27, 2026, by Focus Features. It received generally positive reviews from critics.

== Premise ==
Told through the perspective of filmmaker Daniel Roher as he prepares to become a father, the film investigates the existential threats and potential promises of artificial intelligence. Roher conducts interviews with leading experts in the field to understand the world his child will inherit, balancing anxiety with "apocaloptimism".

== Interviewees ==
- Deborah Raji
- Jason Matheny
- Aza Raskin
- Tristan Harris
- Dan Hendrycks
- Connor Leahy
- Yoshua Bengio
- Ilya Sutskever
- Shane Legg
- Daniel Kokotajlo
- Jan Leike
- Demis Hassabis
- Yuval Noah Harari
- Eliezer Yudkowsky
- Peter Diamandis
- Guillaume Verdon
- Daniela Amodei
- Reid Hoffman
- Rocky Yu
- Karen Hao
- Emily M. Bender
- Timnit Gebru
- Sneha Revanur
- Ramesh Srinivasan
- Sam Altman
- Dario Amodei
- Shaw Walters

== Production ==
The documentary is co-directed by Daniel Roher and Charlie Tyrell. The film is produced by Shane Boris, Diane Becker, and filmmaking duo Daniel Kwan and Jonathan Wang. In October 2024, Focus Features acquired worldwide rights to the film, with its parent Universal Pictures handling international distribution.

== Release ==
The AI Doc: Or How I Became an Apocaloptimist was selected for the "Premieres" section at the Sundance Film Festival, where it made its debut on January 27, 2026.

It was released in U.S. theaters by Focus Features on March 27, 2026.

== Reception ==
On the review aggregator website Rotten Tomatoes, 86% of 57 critics' reviews are positive, with an average rating of 7.4/10. The website's consensus reads: "A comprehensive survey of a brave new world, The AI Doc is a balanced inquiry into a transformative technology that weighs the risks with a touching amount of humanity." Metacritic, which uses a weighted average, assigned the film a score of 65 out of 100, based on 10 critics, indicating "generally favorable" reviews.
