= Blink (2024 American film) =

2024 American documentary film

- Theatrical release poster
- Directed by: Edmund Stenson; Daniel Roher
- Produced by: Melanie Miller; Diane Becker
- Cinematography: Jean-Sébastien Francoeur
- Edited by: Ryan Mullins; Miranda Yousef
- Music by: Tamar-kali
- Production companies: National Geographic Documentary Films; Walt Disney Pictures; MRC; Fishbowl Films; Eyesteel Film
- Distributed by: National Geographic Documentary Films (Worldwide); Walt Disney Studios Motion Pictures (United States and Canada)
- Release dates: August 30, 2024 (Telluride); October 4, 2024
- Running time: 84 minutes
- Country: United States
- Language: English

Blink is a 2024 American documentary film directed by Edmund Stenson and Daniel Roher. It follows a Canadian family who journey around the world prior to their children losing their vision to a rare genetic disorder, in order to experience the world's beauty while they still can.

Produced by National Geographic Documentary Films, it had its world premiere at the 51st Telluride Film Festival on August 30, 2024, and was released on October 4, 2024, by Walt Disney Studios Motion Pictures. (Note: Distributed under the Walt Disney Pictures banner.) It received generally positive reviews from critics.

== Plot ==
The film follows a family that embarks on a journey around the world after learning that their children have been diagnosed with a rare genetic disorder that will eventually cause vision loss. Aware that their children’s ability to see is limited by time, the parents take them on a global adventure to experience the beauty of different landscapes, cultures, and sights before their sight deteriorates.

== Production ==
Edmund Stenson and Daniel Roher co-directed the film, with Stenson primarily involved in the production of the film, due to Roher's commitments to Navalny and the birth of his child.

In September 2023, it was announced Stenson and Roher would direct the film, with National Geographic Documentary Films, MRC and Fishbowl Films set to produce.

== Release ==
It had its world premiere at the 51st Telluride Film Festival on August 30, 2024. It also screened at the Camden International Film Festival on September 15, 2024. It was released on October 4, 2024. The film was released in the United Kingdom by Dogwoof, as with other National Geographic films.

== Reception ==
On the review aggregator website Rotten Tomatoes, 89% of 35 critics' reviews are positive. The website's consensus reads: "An extraordinary adventure tinged with heartbreak, Blink turns the travelogue format into a moving testament to family." Metacritic, which uses a weighted average, assigned the film a score of 69 out of 100, based on nine critics, indicating "generally favorable" reviews.
