= My Dead Dad's Porno Tapes =

2018 short documentary film

- Film poster
- Directed by: Charlie Tyrell
- Written by: Josef Beeby; Charlie Tyrell
- Produced by: Julie Baldassi
- Narrated by: David Wain
- Cinematography: Chet Tilokani
- Edited by: Michael Barker
- Music by: Colin Sigor
- Production companies: Younger Daughter Films; LaRue Productions; Milkman Productions
- Distributed by: The Atlantic
- Release date: January 19, 2018
- Running time: 14 minutes
- Country: Canada
- Language: English

My Dead Dad's Porno Tapes is a 2018 Canadian short documentary film, directed by Charlie Tyrell.

== Summary ==
Blending stop-motion animation, family interviews via phone and live footage, the film depicts Tyrell's attempt to make sense of his complicated relationship with his late father Greg through his remaining possessions, including but not limited to his collection of 1980s porn videotapes.

== Accolades ==
The film was named to the Toronto International Film Festival's year-end Canada's Top Ten list for 2018, and won the Canadian Screen Award for Best Short Documentary at the 7th Canadian Screen Awards in 2019. It was also shortlisted for Best Documentary Short Film at the 91st Academy Awards.
