= Survivors Rowe =

2015 Canadian film

- Directed by: Daniel Roher
- Produced by: Peter O'Brian
- Production company: Loud Roar Productions
- Release date: April 26, 2015 (Hot Docs)
- Running time: 30 minutes
- Country: Canada
- Language: English

Survivors Rowe is a Canadian documentary film, directed by Daniel Roher and released in 2015. The film profiles three of the victims of Ralph Rowe, a former Anglican Church of Canada priest who was convicted in 2012 of sexual abuse against First Nations boys from the Nishnawbe Aski Nation in Northern Ontario.

The film premiered on April 26, 2015, at the Hot Docs Canadian International Documentary Festival. It was subsequently broadcast on TVOntario in 2016, and received a Canadian Screen Award nomination for Best Documentary Program at the 5th Canadian Screen Awards.
