= Once Were Brothers: Robbie Robertson and the Band =

2019 Canadian film

- Film poster
- Directed by: Daniel Roher
- Produced by: Lana Belle Mauro; Stephen Paniccia; Andrew Munger; Sam Sutherland
- Cinematography: Kiarash Sadigh
- Edited by: Eamonn O'Connor; Daniel Roher
- Production companies: Imagine Documentaries; Bell Media Studios; Diamond Docs; PolyGram Entertainment; White Pine Pictures
- Distributed by: Magnolia Pictures
- Release date: September 5, 2019 (TIFF)
- Running time: 98 minutes
- Countries: United States; Canada
- Language: English
- Box office: $536,534

Once Were Brothers: Robbie Robertson and the Band is a 2019 documentary film, directed by Daniel Roher. A portrait of the influential roots rock group The Band, the film is based in part on Robbie Robertson's 2017 memoir Testimony.

The film premiered on September 5, 2019, as the opening film of the 2019 Toronto International Film Festival, the first time the festival has ever selected a Canadian documentary film as its opening gala.

== Reception ==
As of October 2021, 84% of the 62 critical reviews compiled on Rotten Tomatoes are positive, with an average rating of 7/10. The website's critics consensus reads, "Once Were Brothers my [sic] frustrate Band fans looking for a less narrowly focused overview, but the group's music and history remain as engrossing as ever."
