= Church of the Icon of the Mother of God Soothe My Sorrows =

Russian Orthodox church in Moscow, Russia

Coordinates: 55°38′54″N 37°44′51″E

The Church of the Mother of God "Soothes My Sorrows" (Russian: Храм иконы Божией Матери Утоли́ моя́ печа́ли) is a cathedral-sized Russian Orthodox church in Maryino, one of the fastest-growing districts in the Southeast district of Moscow.

== History ==
In 1996, a small wooden church was built. A few years later, on September 2, 1999, the foundation stone for the construction of the larger church was laid. Patriarch Alexey II of Moscow consecrated the church on 24 February 2001. The church was dedicated to the Mother of God "Soothes My Sorrows."

The icon of the Mother of God "Soothe My Sorrow" is known to Orthodox believers for the many miracles it performed in the second half of the 18th century, particularly during the plague outbreak in Russia in 1771.

== General ==
The church's architect was Andrei Obolensky. The building was financed by residents, organizations, and businesses of the city district. The construction cost approximately €88 million. It is the first church in the district, which has a population of over 220,000. The church has a five-domed roof. The interior is still under construction.

== Architecture ==
The church has five domes: the main one is in the center, and four are arranged symmetrically around it, forming a square; they are covered with a copper roof. The church has two bell towers—one with small bells and one with full bells. Above the main entrance, on the outer wall, is the icon "Assuage My Sorrows". The church is 42 meters high.

The main altar is dedicated to the icon of the Mother of God "Assuage My Sorrows".

== Funeral ==
The funeral of Alexei Navalny took place in this church on 1 March 2024.
