= Borisovskoye Cemetery =

Cemetery in Brateyevo, Moscow, Russia

- Борисовское кладбище
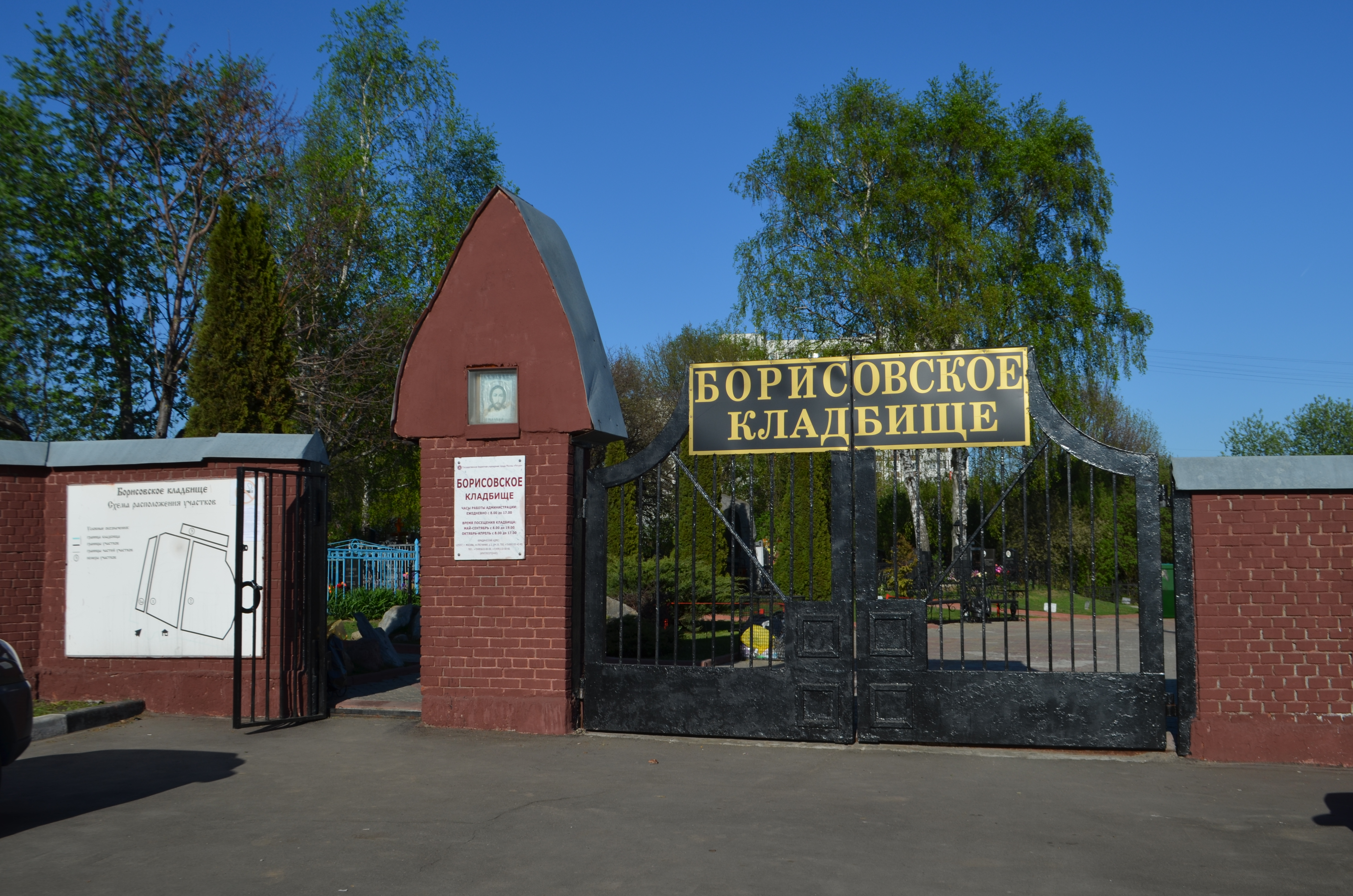
- Interactive map of Borisovskoye Cemetery

Details
- Established: 16th century
- Location: 4 Borisovskie Prudy, Moscow
- Country: Russia
- Coordinates: 55°38′04″N 37°44′05″E
- Size: 4 ha (40,000 m^{2}; 0.04 km^{2})

Borisovskoye Cemetery (Russian: Борисовское кладбище) is a cemetery in the Southern Administrative Okrug of Moscow, in the Brateyevo District, in the north-west of the district. It is one of the oldest cemeteries in the city, formed in the mid-16th century. It has an area of 4 ha (40,000 m^{2}; 0.04 km^{2}). It is under the management of the Government of Moscow through the State Unitary Enterprise "Ritual".

== History ==
The name comes from the former village of Borisovo, known since the end of the 16th century. Since its foundation, the cemetery has practically not expanded, maintaining its original boundaries. Among the modern tombstones and crosses are stone slabs from the 16th century with eight-pointed Old Believers crosses.

Next to the cemetery, to the west of it, the Church of the Hieromartyrs Blasius and Charalampios in Brateevo was built in 2015; the first liturgy was held on July 11. The temple began construction in 2014.

Among the famous buried: artist Yuri Sherstnyov, scientist and military man Fridrich Lavrinenko, writer and literary critic Yuri Kuvaldin, politician Alexei Navalny.
