= Charlie Tyrell =

Canadian film director

- Born: 1988; Hamilton, Ontario, Canada
- Occupation: Film director
- Notable work: My Dead Dad's Porno Tapes; The AI Doc: Or How I Became an Apocaloptimist

Charlie Tyrell (born 1988) is a Canadian film director. He is most noted for his short documentary film My Dead Dad's Porno Tapes (2018), which won the Canadian Screen Award for Best Short Documentary at the 7th Canadian Screen Awards, and for his documentary film The AI Doc: Or How I Became an Apocaloptimist (2026), which he co-directed with Daniel Roher.

== Early life and education ==
Born and raised in Hamilton, Ontario, Tyrell studied film at Ryerson University.

== Career ==
In addition to My Dead Dad's Porno Tapes (2018) and The AI Doc: Or How I Became an Apocaloptimist (2026), he directed the films I Thought I Told You to Shut Up!! (2015), Go to Hell (2017), and Broken Orchestra (2019).

He has also directed music videos for Harrison, The Precious Lo's, Keita Juma and McCallaman.
