= I Thought I Told You to Shut Up!! =

2015 short documentary film

- Film poster
- Directed by: Charlie Tyrell
- Produced by: Trevor Duwyn; Andrew Ferguson; Matt King
- Narrated by: Jonathan Demme
- Cinematography: Chet Tilokani
- Edited by: Josef Beeby
- Music by: Colin Sigor
- Production companies: LaRue Entertainment; Milkman Productions; Radke Films
- Release date: March 14, 2015 (SXSW)
- Running time: 13 minutes
- Countries: United States; Canada
- Language: English

I Thought I Told You to Shut Up!! is a 2015 Canadian short documentary film by Charlie Tyrell about Reid Fleming, "the world's toughest milkman", a cartoon character created by David Boswell.

It was first shown at the South by Southwest film festival.

== Cast ==
- Jonathan Demme as Narrator
- David Boswell
- Gordy Tipple
- Ron Turner
- Bob Mercer
- Matt Groening
- Marv Newland
- Calum Johnston
- Tom Hawthorn
- Dave Thomas
- Kevin Pollak
- Jeph Loeb
- Matt Weisman
- Colin Upton
- Ed Asner
- Richard Beattie
- Billy Gerber

== Awards and festivals ==
- Arizona International Film Festival Winner: Best Documentary Short
- Palm Beach International Film Festival Winner: Best Short Film
- DOXA Documentary Film Festival Honourable Mention for Short Documentary Award
- Hot Docs Canadian International Documentary Festival: Official Selection
- South by Southwest Film Festival: Official Selection
- Chattanooga Film Festival: Official Selection
- Nashville Film Festival: Official Selection
- Athens International Film + Video Festival: Official Selection
- Brooklyn Film Festival: Official Selection
- Nantucket Film Festival: Official Selection
- Milwaukee Short Film Festival: Official Selection
- Palm Springs International Festival of Short Films: Official Selection

== External sources ==
- J E Reich. "Jonathan Demme Narrates Short Film About Cartoonist David Boswell and the World's Toughest Milkman". Tech Times. 20 October 2015.
- Heidi MacDonald. "A Short Film about Reid Fleming, the World's Toughest Milkman has much to teach us". Comics Beat. 20 October 2015.
- Nadine Ajaka. "The Hollywood Impasse Around a 1970s Comic-book Character". The Atlantic. 30 October 2015.
