= Daniel Roher =

Canadian filmmaker

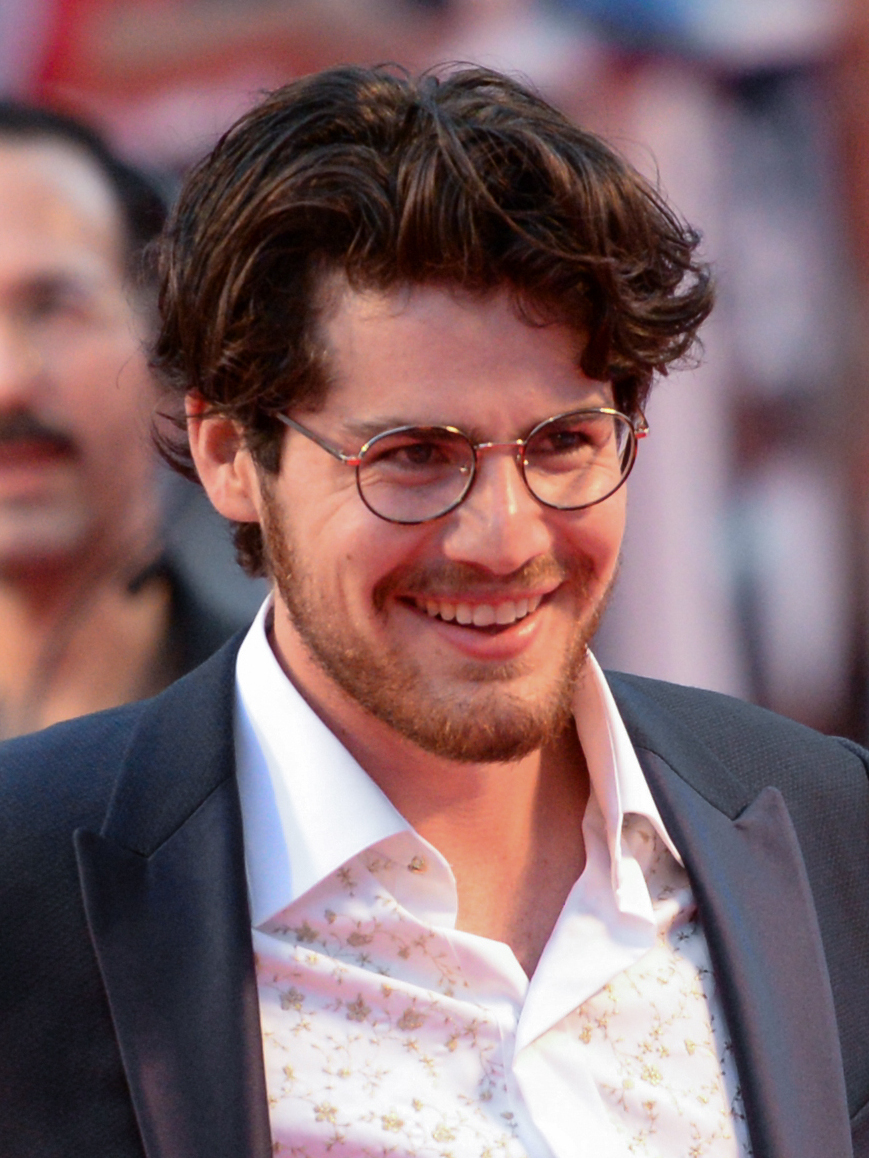
- Roher at the 2019 Toronto International Film Festival
- Born: 1993 (age 32–33); Toronto, Ontario, Canada
- Occupations: Film director; producer; screenwriter
- Notable work: Navalny; Tuner

Daniel Roher (/rɔːr/) is a Canadian film director from Toronto, Ontario.

He is most noted for his 2019 film Once Were Brothers: Robbie Robertson and the Band, which was the opening film of the 2019 Toronto International Film Festival, and his 2022 film Navalny, about the Russian opposition leader, lawyer, anti-corruption activist, and political prisoner Alexei Navalny, which won the Academy Award for Best Documentary Feature Film at the 95th Academy Awards.

== Early life ==
Roher grew up in midtown Toronto, in a Jewish family. After graduating from Etobicoke School of the Arts, he studied for three semesters at the Savannah College of Art and Design in Georgia, USA.

== Career ==
His 2019 film Once Were Brothers: Robbie Robertson and the Band was also screened at the 2019 Whistler Film Festival, where it was the winner of the Whistler Film Festival Documentary Award. Roher and Eamonn O'Connor were Canadian Screen Award nominees for Best Editing in a Documentary at the 8th Canadian Screen Awards in 2020, and Canadian Cinema Editors award nominees for Best Editing in a Documentary in 2020.

Roher previously directed the short documentaries Survivors Rowe, which was a CSA nominee for Best Documentary Program at the 5th Canadian Screen Awards in 2017, and Sourtoe: The Story of the Sorry Cannibal, which was a CSA nominee for Best Direction in a Web Program or Series at the 6th Canadian Screen Awards in 2018.

In 2025, Roher directed Tuner, his first narrative fiction film. The thriller starred Leo Woodall, Dustin Hoffman, Havana Rose Liu, Jean Reno, Lior Raz, and Tovah Feldshuh, and premiered at Telluride Film Festival.

In December 2025, it was announced that Roher would co-direct The AI Doc: Or How I Became an Apocaloptimist, a documentary feature film about the future of AI. The film, co-directed with Charlie Tyrell, premiered at the Sundance Film Festival in January 2026.

== Filmography ==
- Sourtoe: The Story of the Sorry Cannibal (2016)
- Once Were Brothers: Robbie Robertson and the Band (2019)
- Navalny (2022)
- Blink (2024)
- Tuner (2025)
- The AI Doc: Or How I Became an Apocaloptimist (2026)
- Positano (TBA)
