= Navalny (film) =

2022 documentary film by Daniel Roher

- Theatrical release poster
- Directed by: Daniel Roher
- Produced by: Odessa Rae; Diane Becker; Melanie Miller; Shane Boris
- Starring: Alexei Navalny; Yulia Navalnaya; Maria Pevchikh; Christo Grozev; Leonid Volkov
- Cinematography: Niki Waltl
- Edited by: Maya Daisy Hawke; Langdon Page
- Music by: Marius de Vries; Matt Robertson; Anna Drubich
- Production companies: CNN Films; Cottage M; Fishbowl Films; RaeFilm Studios
- Distributed by: Warner Bros. Pictures; Fathom Events
- Release dates: January 25, 2022 (Sundance); April 11, 2022 (United States)
- Running time: 98 minutes
- Country: United States
- Languages: Russian; English
- Box office: $106,399

Navalny is a 2022 American documentary film directed by Daniel Roher. The film revolves around Russian opposition leader Alexei Navalny and events related to his poisoning. It was produced by HBO Max and CNN Films. The film premiered on January 25, 2022, at the Sundance Film Festival, where it received critical and audience acclaim and won the Audience Award in the US Documentary competition and the Festival Favorite Award. It also won the Best Documentary Feature at the 95th Academy Awards, won the award for Best Political Documentary at the 7th Critics' Choice Documentary Awards and picked up best documentary at the 76th BAFTA awards ceremony.

== Synopsis ==
The film is about the events related to the poisoning of Russian opposition leader Alexei Navalny and the subsequent investigation into the poisoning. On August 20, 2020, Navalny was poisoned with a Novichok nerve agent, falling sick during a flight from Tomsk to Moscow, and was hospitalized in serious condition. Navalny was taken to a hospital in Omsk after an emergency landing there, and put in a coma. Two days later, he was evacuated to the Charité hospital in Berlin, Germany. The use of the nerve agent was confirmed by five Organisation for the Prohibition of Chemical Weapons (OPCW) certified laboratories. Navalny blamed Russian president Vladimir Putin for his poisoning, while the Kremlin repeatedly denied involvement.

The film shows how Bellingcat journalist Christo Grozev and Maria Pevchikh, the head investigator for Navalny's Anti-Corruption Foundation, reveal the details of a plot that indicates the involvement of Putin.

The director described the film as "the story of one man and his struggle with an authoritarian regime".

== Production ==
The project was first announced on January 13, 2021. The film was directed by Canadian documentary filmmaker Daniel Roher, who originally planned to make a film about one of the investigations of Christo Grozev. Filming began shortly after Navalny came out of a coma and went on until his arrest in January 2021: according to the main character of the film, the film crew was next to him even at the border control at the airport.

It was produced by HBO Max and CNN Films in partnership with Fishbowl Films, RaeFilm Studios and Cottage M. The project was produced by Fishbowl Films' Diane Becker and Melanie Miller, Cottage M's Shane Boris, RaeFilm Studios' Odessa Rae, CNN Films' Amy Entelis and Courtney Sexton, and Maria Pevchikh.

== Release ==
The film premiered on January 25, 2022, at the Sundance Film Festival as the final title in the U.S. Documentary Competition section, where it won the Festival Favorite Award and the Audience Award for the U.S. Documentary Competition. In March 2022, Warner Bros. Pictures acquired U.S. distribution rights to the film, and set it for an April 11, and April 12, 2022, release.

The film premiered on April 24, 2022, on CNN in the US, as well as on the streaming platform CNN+. Then after the closure of CNN+, the film moved to HBO Max on May 26, 2022.

It was shown on BBC2 on April 25, 2022, and on February 16, 2024, the day of Navalny's death.

== Reception ==
=== Critical response ===
On the review aggregator website Rotten Tomatoes, 97% of 103 critics' reviews are positive, with an average rating of 8.2/10. The website's consensus reads: "Navalny is a documentary that's as gripping as any thriller – but the real-life fight against authoritarianism that it details is deadly serious." Metacritic, which uses a weighted average, assigned the film a score of 82 out of 100, based on 22 critics, indicating "universal acclaim".

Guardian critic Phil Harrison awarded it 5/5 stars calling it "one of the most jaw-dropping things you'll ever witness", and "this terrifying documentary enters the realms of the far-fetched spy thriller – and yet it's all true". New York Times film critic Ben Kenigsberg added the film to the "Critic's List" and also praised it saying "Roher has assembled a tense and absorbing look at Navalny and his inner circle".

=== Accolades ===
Award	Date of ceremony	Category	Recipient(s)	Result	Ref.
Sundance Film Festival	January 30, 2022	Audience Award: U.S. Documentary	Navalny	Won	
Sundance Film Festival	January 30, 2022	Festival Favorite Award	Navalny	Won	
Critics' Choice Documentary Awards	November 13, 2022	Best Documentary Feature	Navalny	Nominated	
Critics' Choice Documentary Awards	November 13, 2022	Best Political Documentary	Navalny	Won	
Critics' Choice Documentary Awards	November 13, 2022	Best Director	Daniel Roher	Nominated	
Critics' Choice Documentary Awards	November 13, 2022	Best Score	Marius de Vries and Matt Robertson	Nominated	
Critics' Choice Documentary Awards	November 13, 2022	Best Editing	Langdon Page and Maya Daisy Hawke	Nominated	
San Diego Film Critics Society	January 6, 2023	Best Documentary	Navalny	Nominated	
San Francisco Bay Area Film Critics Circle	January 9, 2023	Best Documentary Feature	Navalny	Nominated	
Cinema Eye Honors	January 12, 2023	Outstanding Non-Fiction Feature	Daniel Roher, Odessa Rae, Diane Becker, Melanie Miller and Shane Boris	Nominated	
Cinema Eye Honors	January 12, 2023	Outstanding Production	Odessa Rae, Diane Becker, Melanie Miller and Shane Boris	Won	
Cinema Eye Honors	January 12, 2023	Audience Choice Prize	Navalny	Won	
Cinema Eye Honors	January 12, 2023	The Unforgettables	Alexei Navalny	Won	
Georgia Film Critics Association	January 13, 2023	Best Documentary Film	Navalny	Nominated	
Seattle Film Critics Society	January 17, 2023	Best Documentary Feature	Navalny	Nominated	
Houston Film Critics Society	February 18, 2023	Best Documentary Feature	Navalny	Nominated	
Directors Guild of America Awards	February 18, 2023	Outstanding Directorial Achievement in Documentaries	Daniel Roher	Nominated	
British Academy Film Awards	February 19, 2023	Best Documentary	Daniel Roher, Diane Becker, Shane Boris, Melanie Miller, Odessa Rae	Won	
Cinema for Peace Awards	February 24, 2023	Award for Justice	Navalny	Won	
Producers Guild of America Awards	February 25, 2023	Outstanding Producer of Documentary Theatrical Motion Pictures	Odessa Rae, Diane Becker, Melanie Miller, and Shane Boris	Won	
Academy Awards	March 12, 2023	Best Documentary Feature Film	Daniel Roher, Odessa Rae, Diane Becker, Melanie Miller and Shane Boris	Won	
